= Alexander Kennedy (physician) =

Scottish surgeon and antiquary

Alexander Kennedy (1764–1827) was a Scottish surgeon and antiquary.

== Life ==
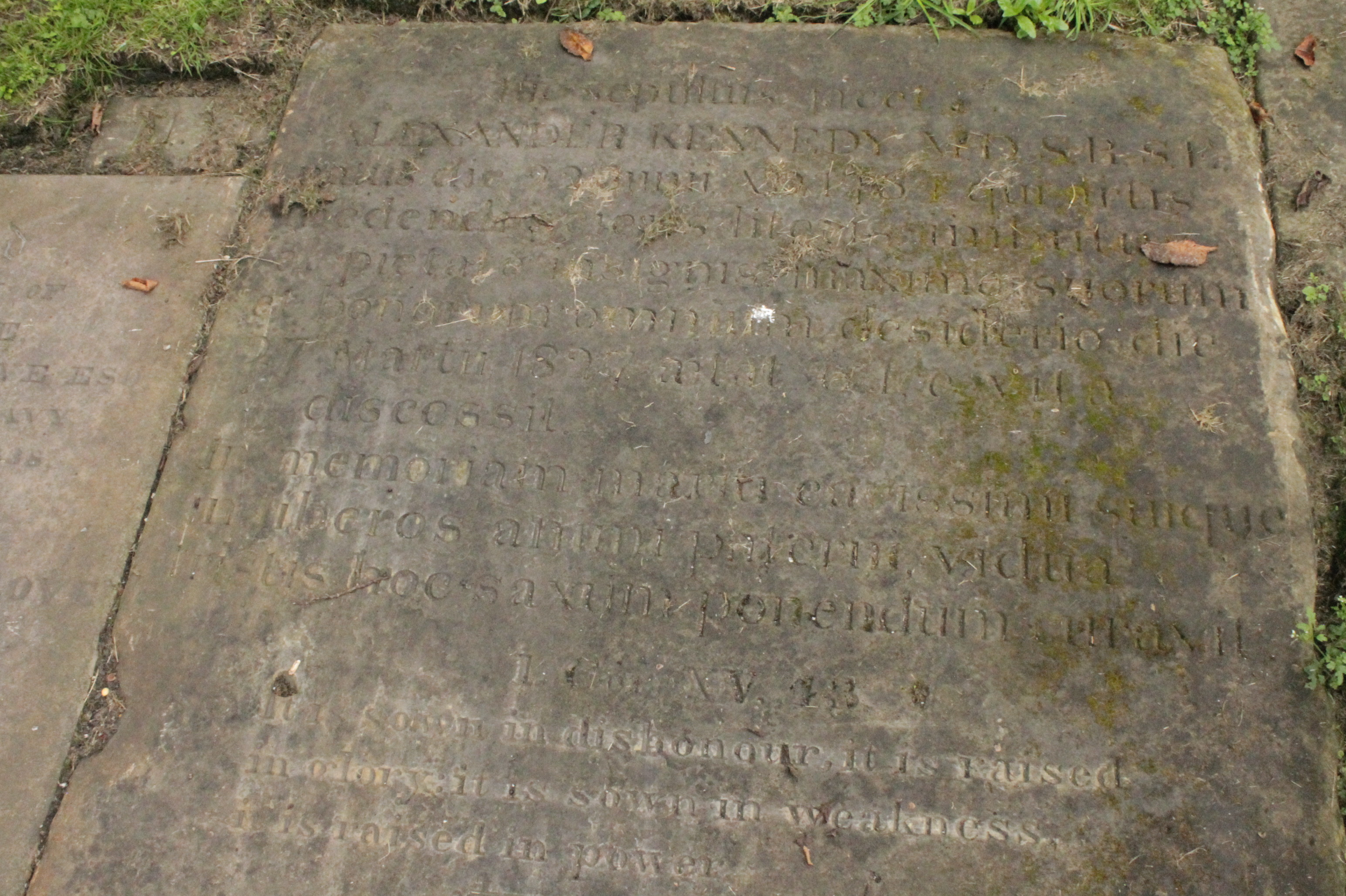
The grave of Dr Alexander Kennedy FRSE, St Cuthbert's Churchyard

He was born on 22 June 1764.

He qualified as a surgeon at Aberdeen University in 1787. He immediately received an appointment with the East India Company as an assistant surgeon, being promoted to full Surgeon in 1795. This role would have seen him serve in a supportive role to many battles in India in the late 18th and early 19th century. In 1808 he took a more sedate and stationery role as Superintending Surgeon with the Indian Medical Service in Madras, which he continued until 1812.

His career from 1812 to 1819 is unclear but he is recorded as the father of Francis, Henry and Patrick Kennedy at Newland, Gloucestershire in January 1812, March 1814 and April 1815 respectively. In 1819 he appears as a practicing physician in Edinburgh. In the same year Aberdeen University awarded him a belated doctorate (MD) and he was elected a Fellow of the Royal Society of Edinburgh. His proposers were Thomas Charles Hope, James Russell and Sir David Brewster. He was elected a Fellow of the Royal College of Physicians of Edinburgh in 1820.

He died at home, 6 Albany Street in Edinburgh's Second New Town on 27 March 1827. He is buried in St Cuthberts Churchyard at the junction of Princes Street and Lothian Road. The grave is marked by a horizontal slab at the west end of the northern section.
