= William Borthwick Johnstone =

Scottish painter and curator (1804–1868)

William Borthwick Johnstone RSA
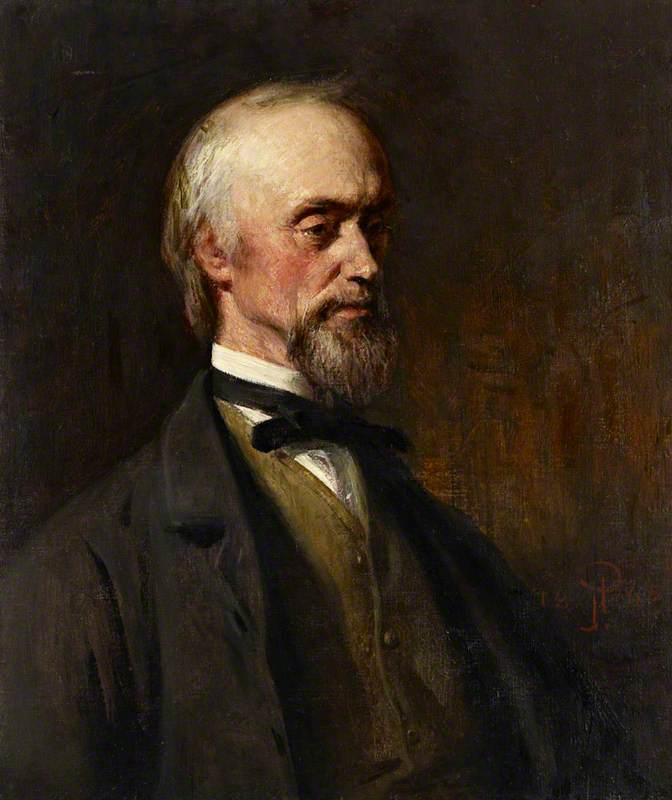
- Portrait by John Phillip (1865)
- Born: 21 July 1804; Edinburgh, Scotland
- Died: 5 June 1868 (aged 63–64); 3 Gloucester Place, Edinburgh
- Resting place: Saint Cuthbert's Churchyard
- Spouse: Ellen Brown (m. 1861)
- Elected: Royal Scottish Academy

William Borthwick Johnstone, RSA (21 July 1804 – 5 June 1868) was a Scottish landscape and historical painter, art collector, and gallery curator. He played an important role in the formation of the National Gallery of Scotland, and served as its first principal curator.

== Life ==
=== Origins ===
William Borthwick Johnstone, born in Edinburgh on 21 July 1804, was a son of John Johnstone, an Edinburgh lawyer, originally from Lanarkshire. Both his father and mother died when he was very young, and he and his younger brother James were placed under the care of Mr. Cunningham, the parish minister of Duns, Berwickshire, where they attended school. Both brothers afterwards entered lawyers' offices in Edinburgh. The younger continued a lawyer throughout life, and became clerk to Lord Benholm the judge.

=== Painting ===
William, disliking the pursuit of law, ultimately devoted himself to painting, beginning in 1836 to contribute to the Royal Scottish Academy. From January 1840 till May 1842 he attended in the evenings the antique class of the Trustees' Academy under the direction of William (afterwards Sir William) Allan. With the single exception of 1843, when he was abroad, he was represented in every exhibition of that body till, and including, the year of his death. Up to 1847 he figures in the catalogues as 'William Johnstone', but in that year he added his mother's name of Borthwick to his signature. In 1840 he was elected an associate, and in 1848 a full member of the Royal Scottish Academy, of which in 1850 he became treasurer, a position for which his business training well qualified him. In 1842 he visited Italy in company with Vatcher, a water-colour painter, residing at first in Venice, and afterwards with Alexander Wison the painter in Rome, where he was much impressed by the works of Overbeck. He returned to Scotland early in 1844.

Johnstone's earlier pictures were mainly landscapes and familiar subjects, and these he handled with more elaboration than marked his later productions, which included many historical paintings. Louis XI of France, attended by his favourite Minister, Olivier le Dain, and A Scene in Holyrood, 1566 (both exhibited in 1855, the latter now in the National Gallery of Scotland), are representative of his best figure-pieces in oil, and his scene from Keats's Isabella and the Pot of Basil was an important water-colour painting. He had studied miniature-painting under Robert Thorburn in London, and executed many portraits of this class. His works show much care and a very genuine feeling for art, but owing to the comparatively late period at which he devoted himself to painting he was never able to acquire complete and easy command over the technique of the craft.

=== Career ===
Johnstone was more eminent as a connoisseur and collector than as a painter, and his experience was of great value on the formation of the National Gallery of Scotland in 1858, when he was appointed first principal curator by the Lords of the Treasury. He drew up the Descriptive and Historical Catalogue of the gallery, and by his energy and skill in negotiation greatly enriched the collection. He occasionally wrote on art subjects in periodicals and the daily press, and is said to have embodied the substance of some lectures on Scottish art by David Laing in two papers which he contributed to the North British Review in 1858 and 1859. He had completed the manuscript of a work on the history of art in Scotland, but after his death it was inadvertently destroyed. Johnstone was an indefatigable collector of works of art and objects of antiquity; his arms, armour, and pictures formed a six days' sale at Chapman's auction-rooms, and several of his examples of antique furniture found a place in Holyrood Palace and the Museum of Science and Art, Edinburgh.

=== Death ===
He died on 5 June 1868, at 3 Gloucester Place, Edinburgh, and was interred in St. Cuthbert's burying-ground.

=== Family ===
On 13 June 1861 he married Ellen, daughter of J. C. Brown, ARSA, who survived him, and presented to the National Gallery of Scotland an admirable cabinet-sized portrait in oils of Johnstone, and a companion portrait of herself, both by John Phillip, RA. In his widow's possession were two cabinet-sized oil portraits of Johnstone, one a seated full-length by Sir Daniel Macnee, PRSA, the other a half-length by Thomas Duncan, ARA; and he is also excellently represented in several of the calotype portraits by D. O. Hill, RSA, and R. Adamson.

== Works ==
Mr and Mrs Johnstone, by John Phillip (1861)
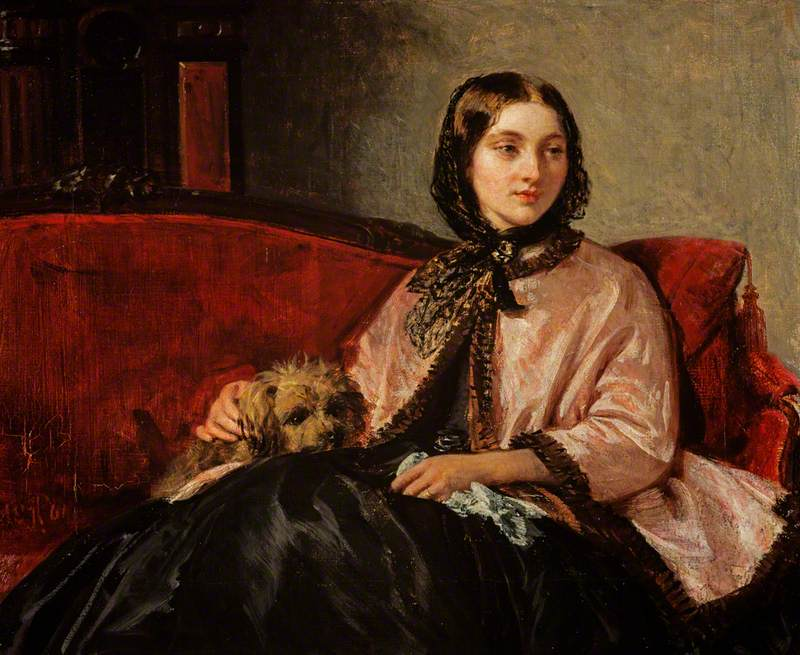
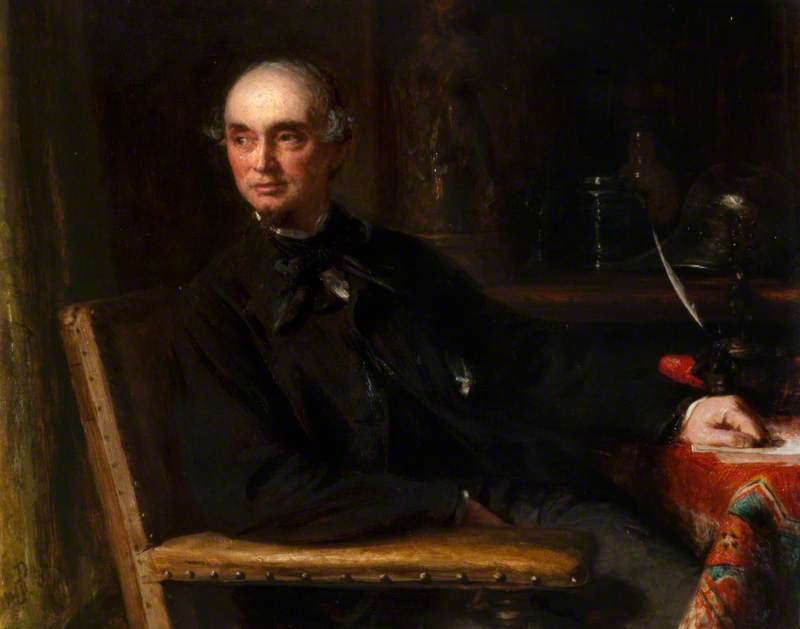
- Edinburgh (Royal Scottish Academy): Scene at Holyrood, 1566 The Death of Rizzio (1855, oil on canvas)
- London (Victoria and Albert Museum): Young Country Women in a Landscape (watercolour)
