= Thomas Sivright =

Thomas Sivright (or Sievwright) of Meggetland and Southhouse FSA Scot FRSE (1783–1835) was a 19th-century Scottish landowner, art collector and bibliophile.

== Life ==
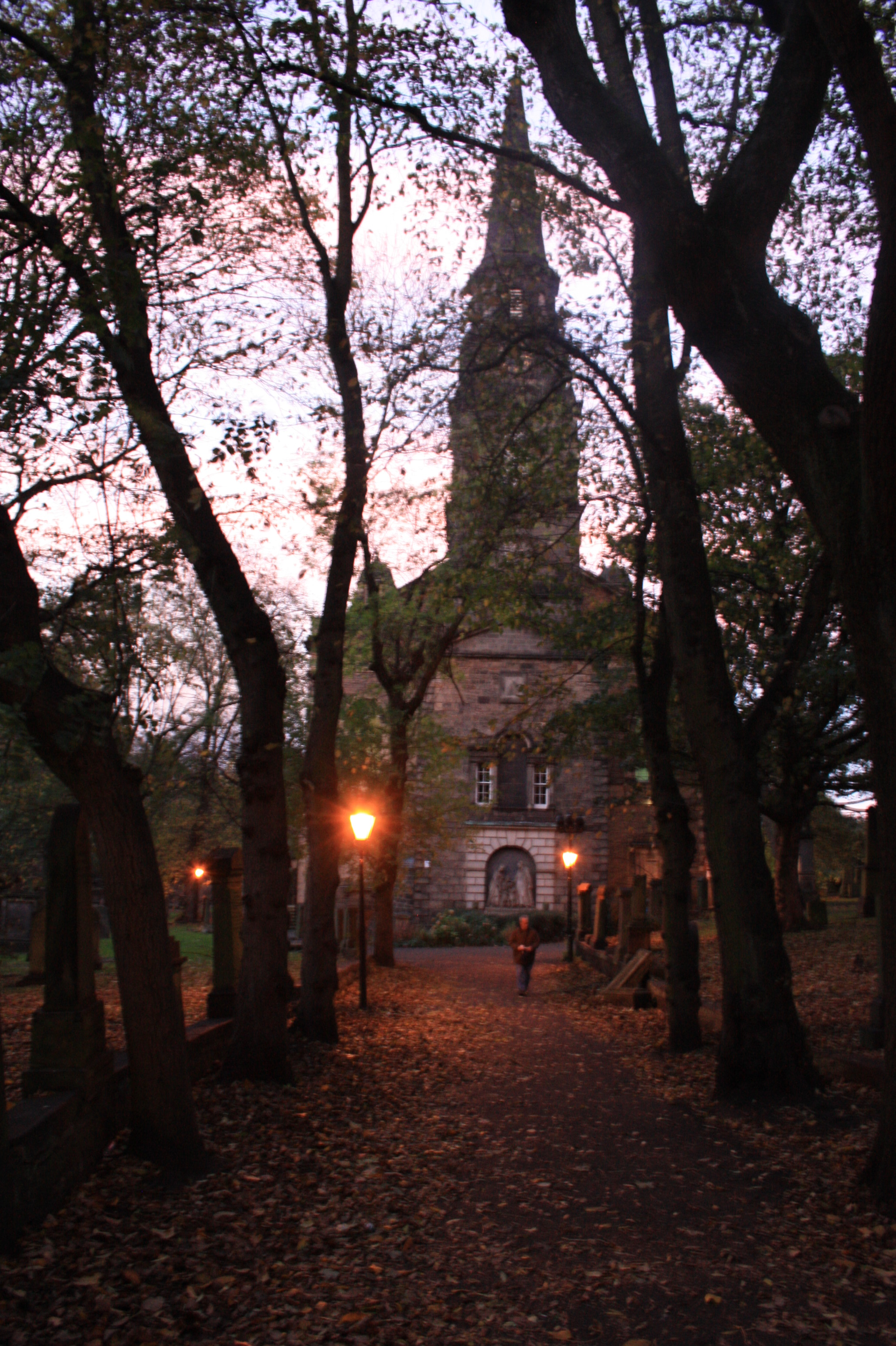
The western approach to St Cuthberts in Edinburgh. The Sivright tomb lies at the base of the steeple

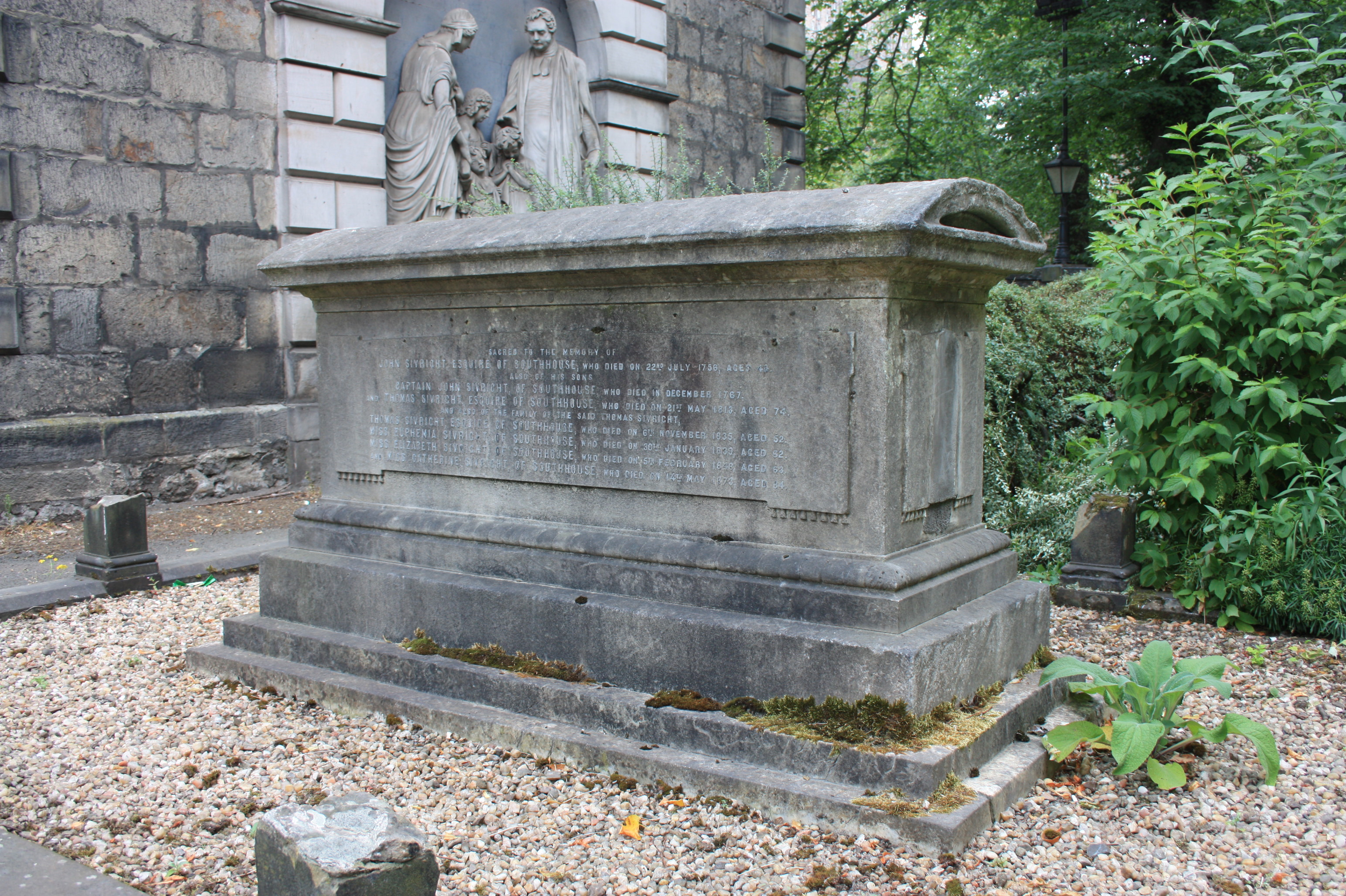
The grave of Thomas Sivright, St Cuthbert's Churchyard, Edinburgh

He was born in Meggetland House, west of Edinburgh the eldest son of Thomas Sivright. The large mansionhouse stood south of the junction of Colinton Road and Polwarth Terrace. The huge grounds are now the Meggetland sports fields. The house was lost to a railway line in the 19th century.

In 1817 he was elected a Fellow of the Royal Society of Edinburgh. His proposers were Sir David Brewster, John Jamieson, and James Bonar. He was elected at the same time as James Skene and William Pulteney Alison.

Over and above his country estates he had a townhouse at 7 West Maitland Street in the West End of Edinburgh.

He died on 6 November 1835. He is buried with his parents in St Cuthberts Churchyard at the west end of Princes Street in Edinburgh. The grave holds a unique position under the west steeple, at the end of the main approach path from Lothian Road.

His valuable book collection was sold by auction in 1836. The auction included several very rare drawings with works by William Blake, Rembrandt, Rubens, Piranesi and Durer. His large collection of Greek and Roman coins and other curiosities was also sold.

== Family ==
Not known.
