= George Winton =

Scottish architect builder

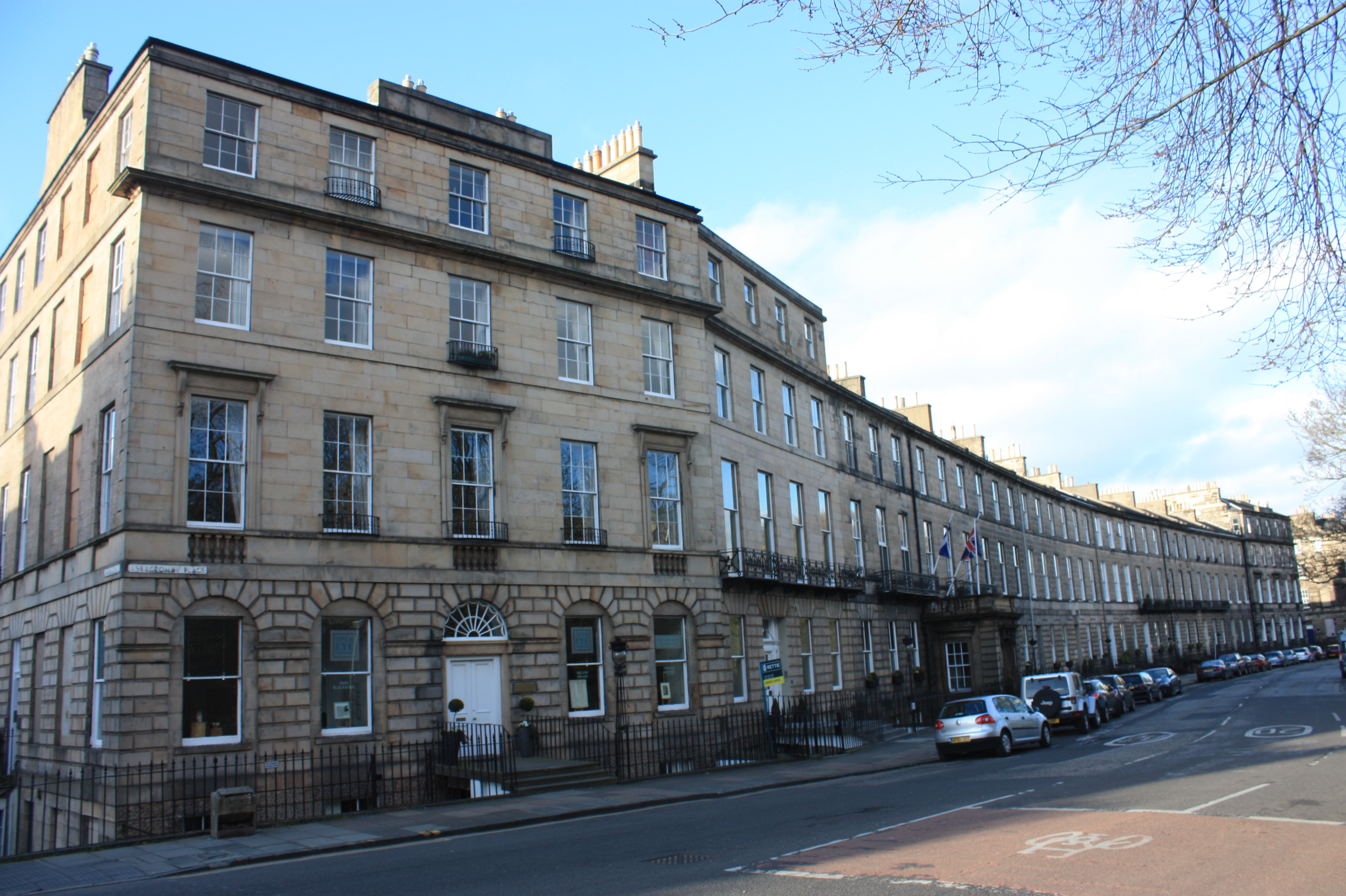
Abercromby Place, Edinburgh

George Winton (1759–1822) was an 18/19th century Scottish architect builder responsible for large sections of the New Town in Edinburgh.

== Life ==
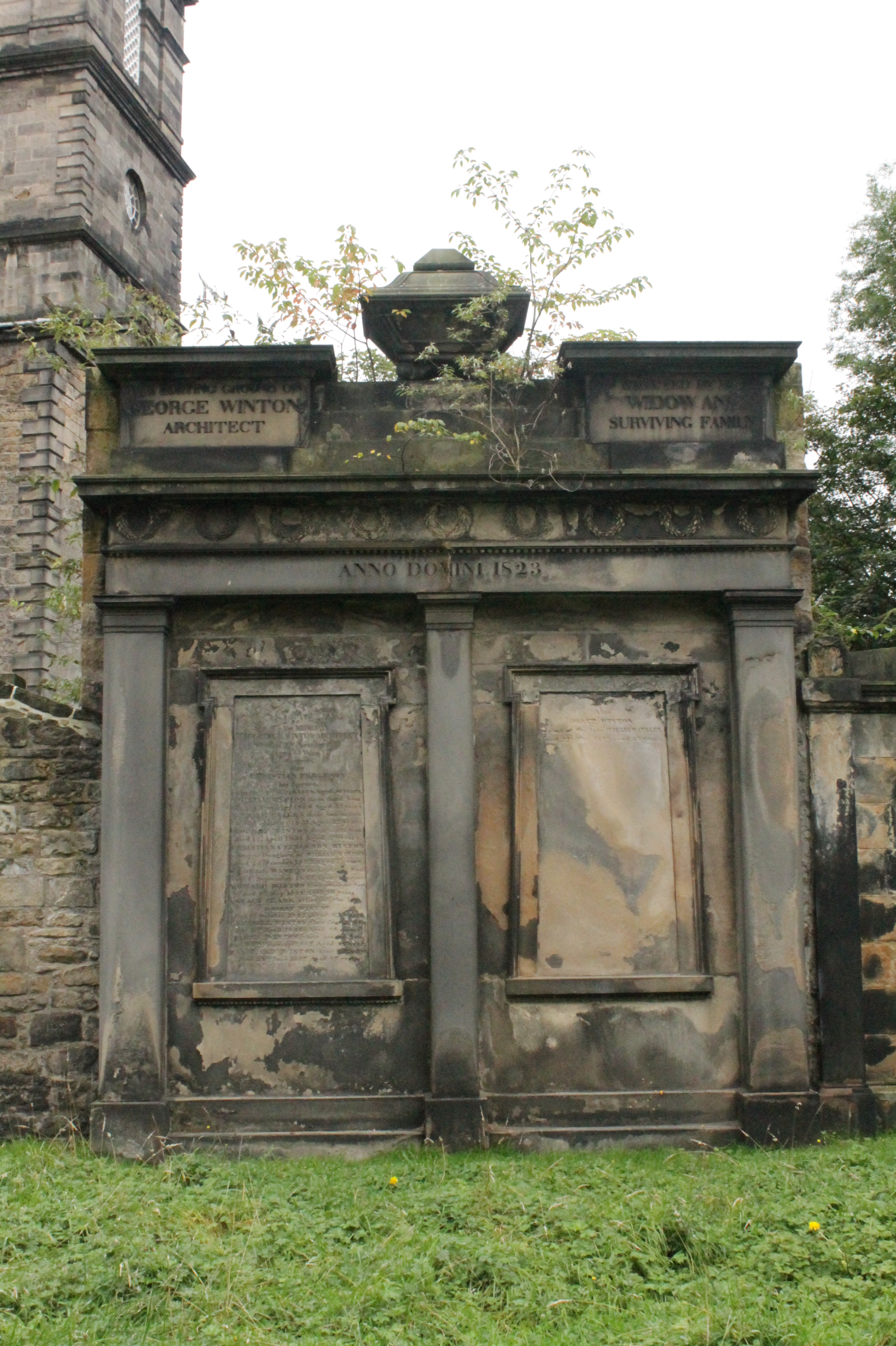
The grave of George Winton, St Cuthbert's churchyard, Edinburgh

He is thought to be English-born rather than Scottish. Given his competence and skill as a Georgian builder he may have worked in Bath prior to arriving in Edinburgh around 1790, specifically to help with the building of the New Town.

His brother Alexander Winton was also a builder in Edinburgh.

In 1794 George was living on South Castle Street in the New Town. In 1800 he was living at 1 South Charlotte Street.

From 1800 to 1815 he collaborated with William Sibbald in the construction of several New Town streets, notably, Abercromby Place, Albany Street, Dublin Street and Northumberland Street. On the latter he worked on the south side with builders Thomas Morison and James Nisbet.

He died on 30 November 1822. He is buried in St Cuthbert's churchyard at the west end of Princes Street Gardens. The grave is marked by the largest monument in the graveyard, reflecting his wealth.

== Family ==
He was married to Christian Winton.

His son George Winton junior was also a builder. He was also father to Peter Winton and William Winton.
