= Nicol Dalgleish =

- Church: Church of Scotland
- In office: 1586 - 1591

Personal details
- Born: 1560
- Died: Unknown
- Occupation: Moderator of the General Assembly

Nicol Dalgleish was a 16th century Church of Scotland minister who served as Moderator of the General Assembly of the Church of Scotland in 1591. This met during a disturbed period in Scotland's history. The Church, in particular, was trying to establish its independence of King James VI and the civil courts. The highlight of the meeting was when they defied a deputation of Lords of Session. They wished to try the case of the Minister of Stirling whose reputation had been called into question in a civil case. A man charged with forgery had confessed to the Minister, but now wished to say the Minister had misused his position to get him to do so. The case was before the Court of Session and it, the King and the Lords of Session did not want the Assembly to interfere. The Assembly was not intimidated and proceeded to examine - and clear - the minister. Nicol Dalgleish presided over these debates.

== Life ==
Nicol was born about 1560. His brother Thomas Dalgleish was a burgess in Inverness so Nicol may have originated in, or had connections with that city. He is mentioned as having been a Regent (or teacher) in St Leonard's College in the University of St Andrews, so he most likely studied there. In 1581 he is mentioned as being a Minister in the Collegiate Charge of St Cuthbert's Church in Edinburgh.

In 1582 he was tried for his life, accused of supporting rebel clergy who had fled from the King. He was acquitted, was tried again. This time it was for corresponding with the rebels - one (partisan) source says that he had merely looked at a letter one of the rebels had written home to his wife. He was sentenced to death, but this was not carried out. It was reported that the scaffold that had been prepared for him was left standing outside his home for several weeks.

He was appointed Chaplain to the Earl of Angus in the early summer of 1586, and left St Cuthbert’s in October of that year. Unfortunately, the Earl died two years later (in 1588) and Nicol had to find another living. He was licensed by the Assembly to find himself some other parish, as "he could not continue for lack of provisioun, 12 July 1586, and had ane testimoniall from the haill parochin

In fact, his St Andrews contacts may have helped. James Melville was the nephew of Andrew Melville, both connected to St Andrews University. James Melville as Principal of the University controlled a number of appointments to parishes, among them one to a post that involved four separate churches - Kilrenny, Anstruther, Pittenweem and Abercrombie. He wanted to establish them as separate parishes with good, reliable (protestant) ministers. He offered Nicol Dalgleish the Pittenweem post, along with an old priory, which had also once belonged to the University

Nicol was settled in Pittenweem by 1588.
