= St Cuthbert's Church, Edinburgh =

St Cuthbert's Church
- The Parish Church of Saint Cuthbert
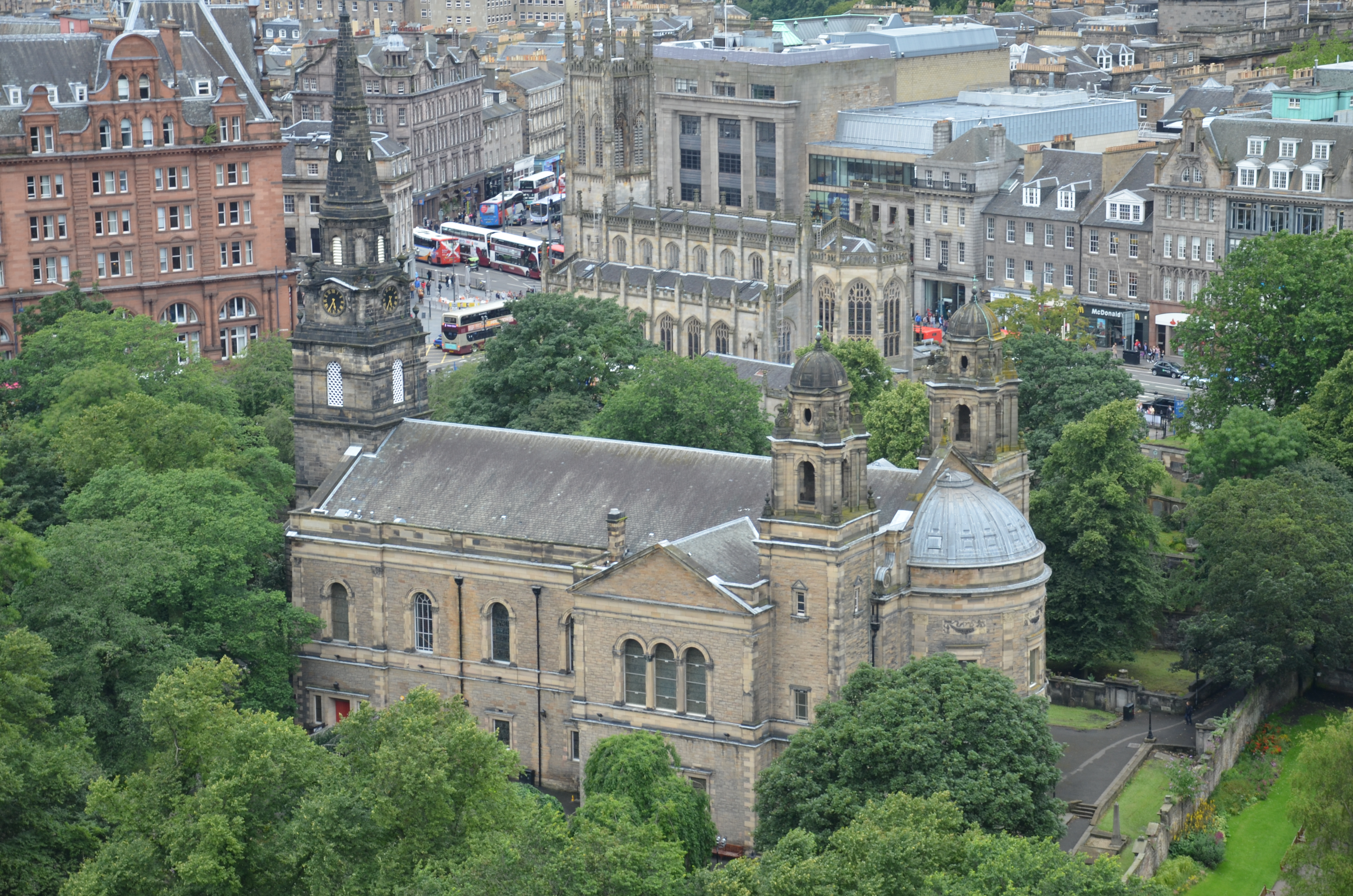
- St Cuthbert's seen from Edinburgh Castle
- St Cuthbert's Church
- 55°56′59″N 3°12′18″W
- Location: 5 Lothian Road, Edinburgh, EH1 2EP
- Country: Scotland
- Denomination: Church of Scotland
- Previous denomination: Roman Catholic
- Website: https://www.stcuthberts-edinburgh.uk/

History
- Former name: West Kirk (17th century–19th century)
- Founded: 7th century
- Dedication: Cuthbert
- Dedicated: 16 March 1242

Architecture
- Functional status: Active
- Heritage designation: Category A listed
- Designated: 14 December 1970
- Architect: Hippolyte Blanc
- Style: Renaissance, Baroque
- Years built: 1892–1894 Dr Hazel Hastie (Interim Moderator) The Revd Suzie Stark (Locum Minister)

Listed Building – Category A
- Official name: Lothian Road, St Cuthbert's Church (Church of Scotland), Churchyard and Monuments, Boundary Walls Gatepiers and Railings
- Designated: 14 December 1970
- Reference no.: LB27339

The Parish Church of St Cuthbert is a parish church of the Church of Scotland in central Edinburgh. Probably founded in the 7th century, the church once covered an extensive parish around the burgh of Edinburgh. The church's current building was designed by Hippolyte Blanc and completed in 1894.

St Cuthbert's is situated within a large churchyard that bounds Princes Street Gardens and Lothian Road. A church was probably founded on this site during or shortly after the life of Cuthbert. The church is first recorded in 1128, when David I granted it to Holyrood Abbey. At that time, the church covered an extensive parish, which was gradually reduced until the 20th century by the erection and expansion of other parishes, many of which were founded as chapels of ease of St Cuthbert's. St Cuthbert's became a Protestant church at the Scottish Reformation in 1560: from after the Reformation until the 19th century, the church was usually called the West Kirk. (Note: George Lorimer gives primary sources from the 1580s and 1636 that refer to the church as "St Cuthbert's". Lorimer argues the change to the name "West Kirk" was motivated less by reformed principle and more by the expansion of Edinburgh, which saw St Cuthbert's develop from a rural to an urban church. The name "St Cuthbert's" appears on Communion tokens from as early as 1776.) After the Restoration in 1660, the congregation remained loyal to the Covenanters. The church's position at the foot of Castle Rock saw it damaged or destroyed at least four times between the 14th and 17th centuries.

The current church was built between 1892 and 1894 to replace a Georgian church, which had itself replaced a building of uncertain age. The building was designed by Hippolyte Blanc in the Baroque and Renaissance styles and retains the steeple of the previous church. The Buildings of Scotland guide to Edinburgh calls the church's furnishings "extraordinary". Features include stained glass windows by Louis Comfort Tiffany, Douglas Strachan, and Ballantyne & Gardiner; mural paintings by Gerald Moira and John Duncan; and memorials by John Flaxman and George Frampton. The church also possesses a ring of ten bells by Taylor of Loughborough. The church has been a Category A listed building since 1970.

Seven of the church's ministers have served as Moderator of the General Assembly of the Church of Scotland during their incumbencies, including Robert Pont, who held the role on six occasions between the 1570s and 1590s. The church's present work includes ministries among homeless people and Edinburgh's business community.

== History ==
=== Earliest days to the Reformation ===
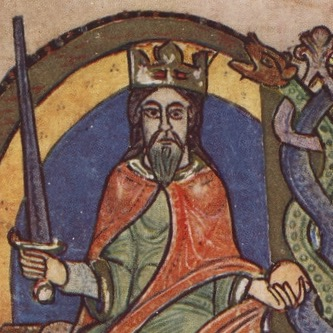
David I, who granted St Cuthbert's to Holyrood Abbey in 1128.

It is uncertain when the first church of St Cuthbert was founded. Some secondary sources date its foundation to the latter part of the 7th century, during or shortly after the life of Saint Cuthbert. (Note: One legend claims Cuthbert himself founded the church after travelling from Melrose and pitching his tent within the sheltered hollow below the Castle Rock.) Others place its foundation and dedication to the saint after the arrival to Scotland of Queen Margaret in 1069. St Cuthbert's may be the church of "Edwinsbruch" which Symeon of Durham refers to as being in the possession of Lindisfarne in 854. The parish may also have covered the whole of Edinburgh before the parish of St Giles' was detached from it in the 12th century.

The earliest explicit record of the church comes in a charter of c. 1127, issued by David I granting to St Cuthbert's Church near the castle ′all the land below the castle, from the spring which rises beside the corner of the king's garden along the road to the church, and from the other side beneath the castle to a road beneath the castle towards the east′.

The 1127 charter is followed almost immediately by another charter in 1128. This charter, issued by David I, gave the parish of St Cuthbert to Holyrood Abbey. This charter also granted the Abbey two chapels of the church, located at Liberton and Corstorphine; these became independent parish churches around the middle of the 13th century. The church of St Cuthbert was consecrated by David de Bernham, bishop of St Andrews on 16 March 1242; this was probably a re-consecration to correct the loss of any previous record of consecration. In 1251, Bishop David annexed the parsonage of St Cuthbert's to Holyrood, whereafter it became a perpetual vicarage, usually held by one of the canons of Holyrood. By the 15th century, the church contained multiple subsidiary altars served by chaplains.

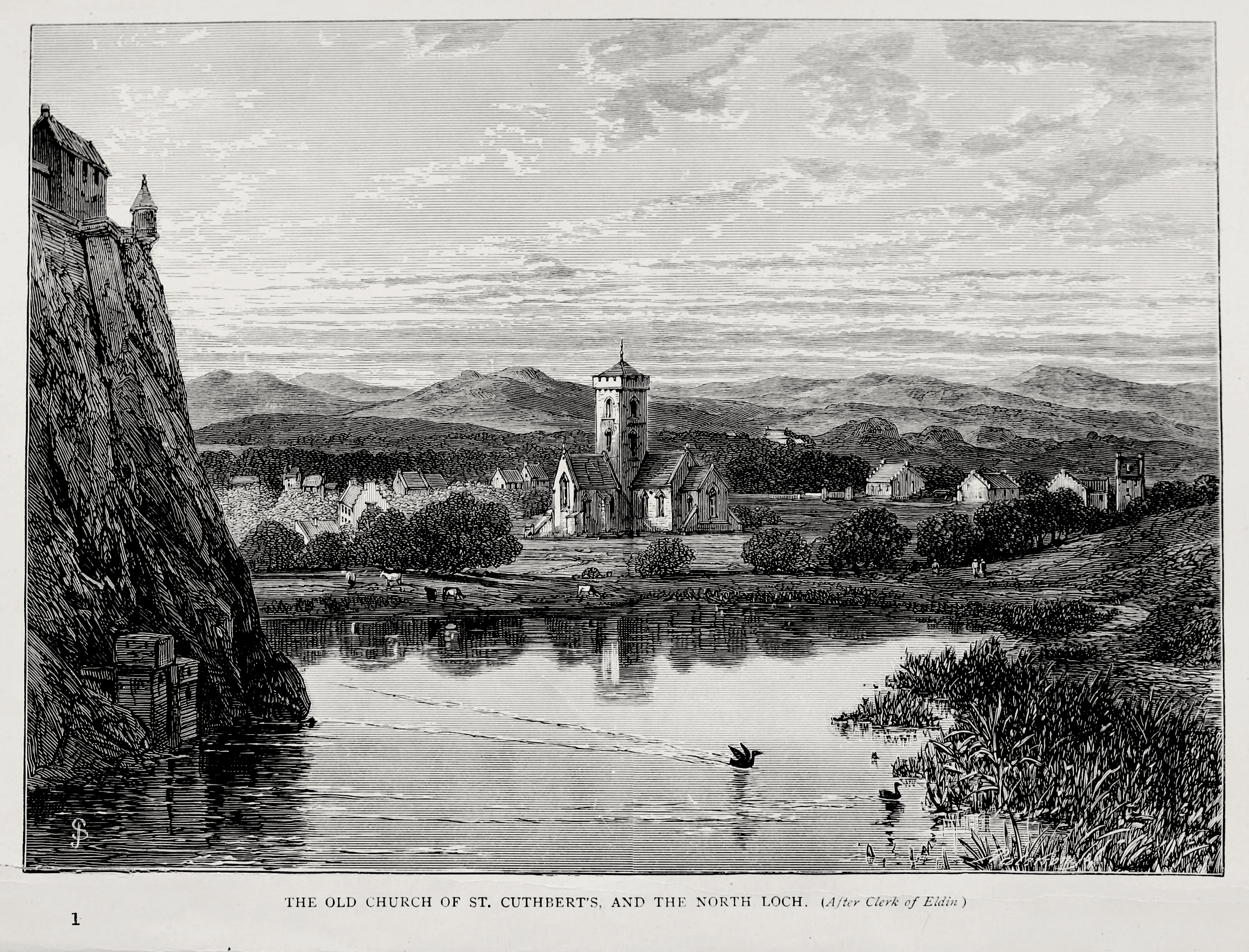
19th century depiction of the medieval St Cuthbert's and the Nor Loch

A relic of the medieval St Cuthbert's was discovered in 1773: while demolishing the old church, workmen discovered bones and a leaden urn within a leaden coffin. The urn issued a fragrant smell and within it lay an embalmed human heart. The heart may have been that of a crusader that was returned to his family from the Holy Land.

The church may have been destroyed during Richard II's sack of Edinburgh in 1385 and again during the sack of Edinburgh in 1544. After the latter destruction, it may have been rebuilt: in 1550, Alexander Ales referred to "the new Parish Church of St Cuthbert's". By the time of the Scottish Reformation, St Cuthbert's parish covered a large area surrounding the burghs of Edinburgh and the Canongate: it bounded Newhaven and Cramond in the north; Corstorphine in the west, Colinton and Liberton in the south; and Duddingston and Restalrig in the north. The parish also contained nunneries at Sciennes and on the Pleasance.

The first Protestant minister of St Cuthbert's was William Harlaw, a colleague of John Knox, who, unlike Knox himself, had remained in Scotland in the face of persecution. In 1574, Harlaw was joined by Robert Pont. Skilled in law as well as theology, Pont served as moderator of the General Assembly on six occasions and also acted as a Lord of Session. John Napier served as an elder of St Cuthbert's around the turn of the 17th century.

=== Conflict: 1572–1689 ===
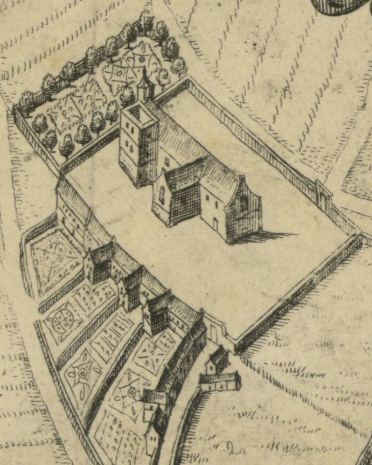
St Cuthbert's and its surroundings in 1647, from James Gordon of Rothiemay's map of Edinburgh

In the 16th and 17th century, St Cuthbert's position in the shadow of Edinburgh Castle left the church vulnerable when the Castle came under attack. In January 1573, during the siege of the Castle in the Marian civil war, troops of the Regent Morton occupied St Cuthbert's and were attacked by some of the defenders of the castle, who set fire to the church on 17 January 1573. The church was probably rebuilt after this. In 1593, a new church, known as the "Little Kirk" was constructed at the western end.

When Charles I erected the Diocese of Edinburgh in 1633, St Cuthbert's was allocated to the new diocese. The church was again damaged during the Bishops' Wars in 1640–1642. The congregation had decamped to the Dean by May 1640. In the summer of 1650, the church was occupied as a battery by the soldiers of Oliver Cromwell. The congregation met in the Town's College during these events, returning only in 1655.

In 1660, at the Restoration and the reintroduction of episcopacy in the Church of Scotland, the ministers and most of the congregation adhered to the Covenants and were expelled from the established church. David Williamson and James Reid ministered to the faithful at a new site in the Dean.

At the Glorious Revolution in 1689, the church was damaged by cannon fire from the Castle and the congregation again removed to the Dean. The accession of William of Orange led to the abolition of episcopacy in the Church of Scotland and the right to nominate ministers of St Cuthbert's passed to the Crown. Nomination could, however, prove controversial: in 1732, the imposition of Patrick Wotherspoon as minister caused a riot around the doors of the church. This was quelled by the intervention of the town guard under Captain Porteous. David Williamson returned as minister at the revolution and remained until his death in 1706. Known as "Dainty Davie" for the delicacy of his manners, Williamson was a leading figure in church and state, serving as Moderator of the General Assembly in 1702.

=== 18th century to present ===
St Cuthbert's was loyal to the Hanoverians during the Jacobite risings and provided a quota of volunteers to suppress the 1715 rebellion. During the 1745 rebellion, Jacobite troops were stationed in St Cuthbert's. During their occupation of Edinburgh, the Jacobites restricted worship within the city churches yet worship continued in St Cuthbert's as usual and the minister, Neil McVicar, avoided the proclamation to pray for Charles Edward Stuart. McVicar instead offered the prayer: "Bless the King. Thou knowest what King I mean. As for the man that is come among us seeking an earthly crown, we beseech Thee in mercy to take him to Thyself, and give him a crown of glory."

St Cuthbert's was involved in the early development of Methodism. In May 1764, John Wesley visited St Cuthbert's for communion; in his journal, he unfavourably compared the rites to those of the Church of England. Lady Maxwell of Pollok, one of Wesley's leading supporters in Scotland, was also a member of St Cuthbert's.

By the middle of the 18th century, the Church of St Cuthbert was nearing ruin: in 1745, the roof of the Little Kirk was destroyed and in 1772, the collapse of some seating occasioned the condemnation of the building. The congregation decamped to the Methodist Chapel in Low Calton and returned on 31 July 1775, when the new church was opened.

The Disruption of 1843 little affected St Cuthbert's. Neither minister joined the Free Church; however, six elders did and founded Free St Cuthbert's. (Note: Free St Cuthbert's worshipped in several locations before moving into a purpose-built church on Spittal Street, Tollcross. The congregation joined the United Free Church in 1900 and, in 1911, vacated their Spittal Street buildings and united with Dean U.F. Church in 1911 to become St Cuthbert's U.F. and Belford.)

By the late 19th century, the 18th-century church was inadequate for what was, by then, one of Scotland's largest congregations. The final service was held on 11 May 1890 and the foundation stone of the new church was laid on 18 May 1892 by William Hay, 10th Marquess of Tweeddale, Lord High Commissioner to the General Assembly of the Church of Scotland, who read a message from Queen Victoria. The new church, designed by Hippolyte Blanc, was opened on 11 July 1894. The interior of the church was embellished with furnishings and artwork throughout the 20th century. On 11 September 1930, Agatha Christie married her second husband, Max Mallowan, in the memorial chapel.

== Parish ==
=== Territory and population ===
From earliest times to the 19th century, St Cuthbert's parish covered a large area around Edinburgh. In the late Northumbrian period, St Cuthbert's may have served as the minster for an area stretching from the environs of Edinburgh to the River Almond in the west and the Pentland Hills in the south. The parish had been reduced in size in the mid-13th century by the detachment of Liberton and Corstorphine. Prior to the foundation of St Giles' in the 12th century, the parish may also have covered the burgh of Edinburgh itself.

By the time of the Scottish Reformation, St Cuthbert's parish contained around 2,000 inhabitants and covered a large area surrounding the burghs of Edinburgh and the Canongate: it bounded Newhaven and Cramond in the north; Corstorphine in the west, Colinton and Liberton in the south; and Duddingston and Restalrig in the east. The parish also contained nunneries at Sciennes and the Pleasance, two chapels on the Burgh Muir and other chapels at Newhaven, Low Calton, and Wester Portsburgh.

After the Reformation, the size of the parish was reduced by the extension of Edinburgh's parishes in 1621 and again by the transfers of Saughton and Ravelston to Corstorphine and Craiglockhart to Colinton in 1627 and the transfer of Newhaven to North Leith in 1630. By 1642, the parish was divided into 21 area divisions; by 1743, this had increased to 26. In the same year, the population of the parish was 9,493, rising to 12,000 in 1753; by 1822, the population of the parish's southern division alone was 20,250.

=== Chapels of ease ===
In 1754, the kirk session agreed to address the parish's growing population by constructing the first of a number of chapels of ease. Completed in 1756 and known as the Buccleuch Chapel, the General Assembly recognised this first chapel as a parish quoad sacra in 1834. By the creation of other chapels and their elevation as parish churches, the size of St Cuthbert's parish was gradually reduced.

Chapels of ease of St Cuthbert's
Name	Location	Founded	Quoad sacra	Notes
Buccleuch	Southside	1756	1834	
Claremont Street	Stockbridge	1823	1834	Named "St Bernard's", 1851.
Hope Park	Newington	1824	1834	Named "Newington", 1859.
St David's	Fountainbridge	1831	1834	
Water of Leith	Dean	1836		Named "Dean", 1870.
Morningside		1836	1838	
St Aidan's	Tollcross	1885	1887	
Bonnington		1900	-	Dissolved, 1924.
St Serf's	Inverleith	1900	1912	

==== Detached parishes ====
In addition to chapels of ease founded by St Cuthbert's, the erection of other parish churches further reduced the size of St Cuthbert's parish. St Andrew's, St George's, St Mary's, and St Stephen's covered the expanding area of the New Town and were raised by the town council between 1781 and 1828. Otherwise, most of these churches were raised as missions by St Cuthbert's or by neighbouring churches. As early as 1836, St Cuthbert's supported missionaries in St Leonard's and Canonmills.

Parishes detached from St Cuthbert's
Name	Location	Mission	Quoad sacra	Notes
St Andrew's	George Street	-	1781	
St George's	Charlotte Square	-	1811	
St Mary's	Bellevue	-	1824	Founded as "Bellevue Chapel"
St Stephen's	Stockbridge	-	1828	
Roxburgh Place	Southside	-	1834	Admitted from the Relief Church
St Paul's	St Leonard's	-	1836	Joined the Free Church, 1843
Robertson Memorial	The Grange	1870	1871	Also known as "Grange"
West Coates		1870	1871	
St Leonard's		1878	1884	Mission of Newington
St Margaret's	Dumbiedykes	1868	1885	Founded as "Queen's Park Chapel"
St Michael's	Shandon	1876	1887	
St James'	New Town	1858	1891	Mission of St Andrew's as "Elder Street"
Craiglockhart		1880	1897	Mission of the Presbytery
St Oswald's	Bruntsfield	1890	1907	Mission of Morningside as "St Mark's"
Tynecastle	Gorgie	1885	1912	Mission of St Michael's
Charteris Memorial	Pleasance	1905	1934	Founded as "St Ninian's Mission"

=== Schools and poorhouse ===
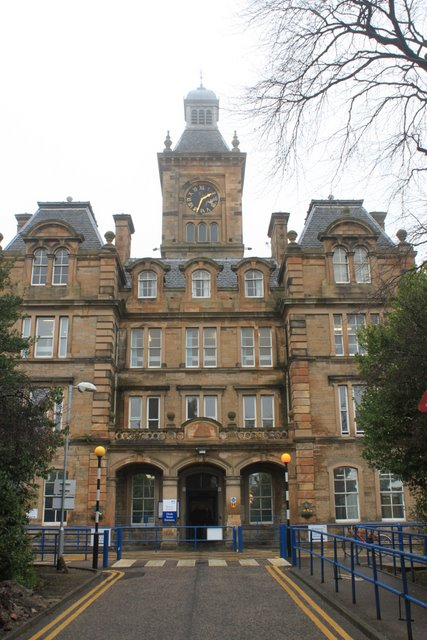
St Cuthbert's Poorhouse in Craigleith, opened in 1871 and now part of the Western General Hospital

A parish school in St Cuthbert's is first mentioned in 1596. In 1612, Samuel West applied to found a grammar school in the West Port; he was followed by others, who founded schools at the Pleasance, Burghmuirhead, the Dean, and at Kirkbraehead (now Lothian Road). In 1826, a parish school was constructed in Dean Street and transferred to the parish of St Bernard's in 1852.

In 1583, the kirk session introduced beggars' badges for use in the parish. The use of begging badges continued, with an interruption between 1731 and 1739, until 1762, when the church opened a charity poorhouse on Riding School Lane, now on the site of the Caledonian Hotel. The number of occupants rose from 84 at the poorhouse's foundation to 539 in 1837. By this time, the poorhouse incorporated a school for over 200 children as well as a sewing school. In 1867, the Caledonian Railway's construction of Princes Street Station forced the poorhouse to move. From 1871, the poorhouse then occupied a new building in Craigleith, designed by Peddie and Kinnear. During the First World War, this was occupied as an army hospital and now forms the oldest part of the Western General Hospital.

=== Halls ===
St Cuthbert's maintained mission halls in Morrison Street in Tollcross from 1849 to 1967 and on Freer Street in Fountainbridge from 1903 to 1958.

The former church halls stand within the churchyard slightly south of the church and facing onto King's Stables Road. The two-storeyed halls were completed in 1893 to designs of McCarthy and Watson and are in the Queen Anne style, displaying the influence of James Gibbs. The halls replaced an earlier building by MacGibbon and Ross, which was demolished due to the expansion of the railway. The halls were refurbished in 1981 and given over to commercial purposes after the creation of new rooms within the church itself in the early 1990s. They have been Category C listed since 2000.

== Architecture ==
=== Previous buildings ===
==== Pre-1775 church ====
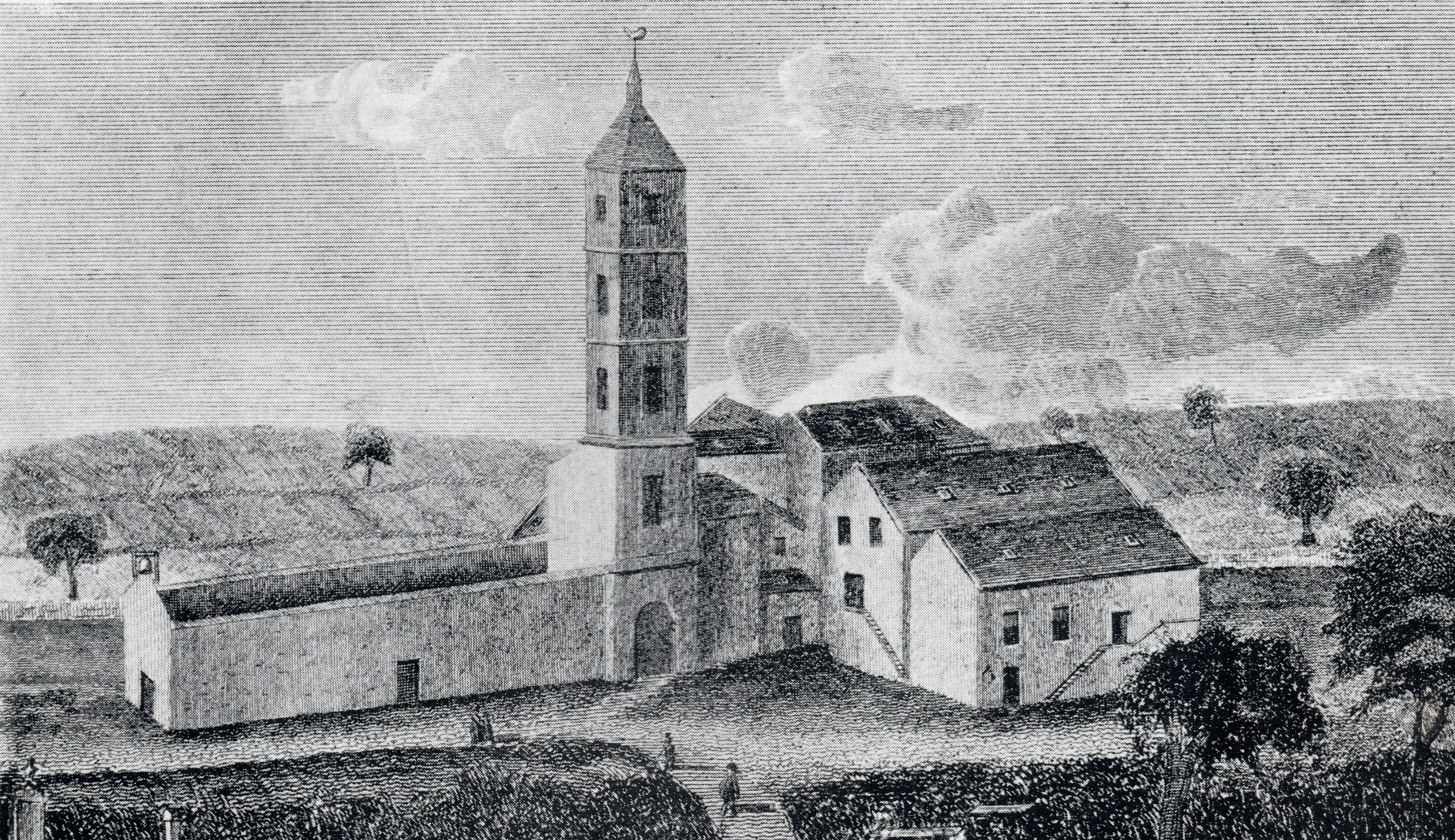
St Cuthbert's in 1772; on the left side of the tower is the Little Kirk, unroofed in 1745.

Before the building of the previous St Cuthbert's in 1775, the architectural history of the church is unclear. When the Georgian church was demolished, evidence of six previous buildings was claimed to have been found. The preceding church may have been built after the sack of Edinburgh in 1544 and before 1550, when Alexander Ales refers to the "new parish church of St Cuthbert's". Alternatively, the church demolished in the 1770s may have been constructed in the wake of the Lang Siege. When the 1775 church was demolished, a number of Gothic moulded stones were discovered among the rubble: these probably came from the earlier church.

James Gordon of Rothiemay's 1647 map of Edinburgh shows a long building with a pitched roof, a transept at the south, and a tower at the west. From the late 16th century, records of the kirk session make frequent references to repairs and additions to the church. Many of these concern the addition of new lofts to accommodate a growing congregation. In 1593, an extension, known as the "Little Kirk" was added to the west of the church, the steeple was rebuilt, and the church's thatch roof was replaced with slates. The church was damaged during the Protectorate and afterwards repaired, except for the Little Kirk, which was converted into a burial aisle. The Little Kirk was unroofed in 1745. By the time of its demolition, St Cuthbert's was an amorphous collection of extensions; William Sime described an interior of "petty galleries stuck up one above another, to the very rafters, like so many pigeons' nests".

The only portion of this church to survive is the burial vault of the Nisbets of Dean under the north side of the church, the entrance to which is marked by a stone plaque, bearing the family arms and dated 1692. The plaque was taken down and reinstated during the construction of the 1775 church and again during the construction of the current church.

==== Georgian St Cuthbert's ====
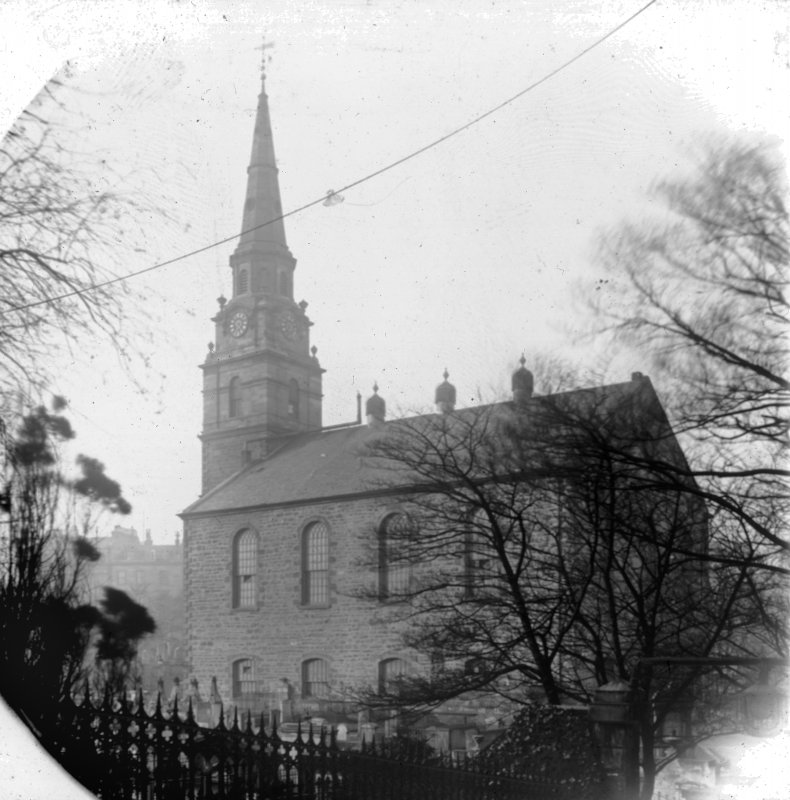
The Georgian church prior to demolition

In 1772, the older church was condemned and replaced with a simple, barn-like church designed and built by James Weir. The church stood four bays in length and three in width with a long, round-headed upper window in each bay; in the longitudinal walls, these stood above shorter, segmental-arched lower windows. The roof rested at a shallow pitch. An oculus adorned the space beneath the apex of the east gable. The corners were quoined.

Initially, this church possessed a pedimented tower whose base projected from the line of the west gable but whose height extended no further than the line of the roof. Between 1789 and 1790, Alexander Stevens heightened the tower by addition the steeple. The tower and its steeple are the only surviving portion of the Georgian church, having been retained during the construction of the current church.

Internally, box pews and two storeys of semi-octagonal galleries surrounded the tall, canopied pulpit. The galleries were accessed by a stairway in the west tower with trap stairs leading into the galleries. The church could seat up to 3,000.

By 1888, the church had become unfashionable and unsafe and Hippolyte Blanc was appointed to design a replacement. Blanc first proposed only to recase the building; it was later decided to rebuild the church on a larger scale. The last service was held in the Georgian church on 11 May 1890. The money for the rebuild was in large part from the will of Rev James Veitch who had died in 1879.

=== Present church ===
==== Exterior ====
Except for the steeple, the church was designed by Hippolyte Blanc in the Renaissance and Baroque styles and constructed between 1892 and 1894. Blanc's exterior is executed in cream sandstone, roughly dressed and snecked with ashlar dressings. The exterior is divided into upper and lower levels by a continuous course of ashlar. Every corner of the church is decorated with half-fluted Corinthian pilasters on the upper stage and quoining on the lower. The roof rests at a shallow pitch and is slated.

The north and south elevations of the church are near-identical. Round-arched windows pierce the upper level of each of the four western bays. The architraves of these windows are supported by half-fluted Corinthian pilasters. The lower level of each bay is pierced by an oblong window below a corniced architrave. The westernmost bay on each side is slightly advanced and a door, flanked to the west by a small window, stands in place of the lower window. Along the top of these four bays runs a tall ashlar parapet.

Towards the east end of each side extends a shallow pedimented transept. In the lower level stands a door with Doric pilasters in a corniced surround, flanked by small windows. The upper level of the transept is pierced by an arcade of three round-arched windows, flanked by half-fluted Corinthian pilasters and supported by Corinthian column mullions. West of the transept on the north side, steps descend to a round-arched doorway in the basement level of the church: this is the Nisbet of Dean burial vault, constructed in 1692 and retained during the construction of the current church and its predecessor.

The north and south elevations terminate with square-based, three-storeyed Baroque towers on the east sides of the transepts. Small oblong windows pierce each of the upper two storeys and doors stand in the ground level. Each tower is crowned by a decorative urn in each corner and a lantern, which consists of a square-based lower stage and an octagon-based cupola upper stage. The lower stage of the lantern is pierced by a tall, open, round-headed arch in each face while angled buttresses with half-fluted double Ionic pilasters support each corner. The buttresses are capped by decorative scrolls that rest against the intermediate faces of the octagonal cupola while oculi pierce the cardinal faces. Each cupola is crowned by a dome capped with a ball finial.

The twin towers form the flanks of the east elevation. The central section is dominated by the semi-circular apse, which is covered by a leaded half-dome beneath the apex of the pointed east gable. The lower stage of the apse is undecorated while the upper stage is divided into three bays by Corinthian pilasters. In each bay, an oblong window sits below a panel with carved garlands. The wall each side of the apse advances slightly from the line of the towers and is capped with a decorative scroll.

Exterior

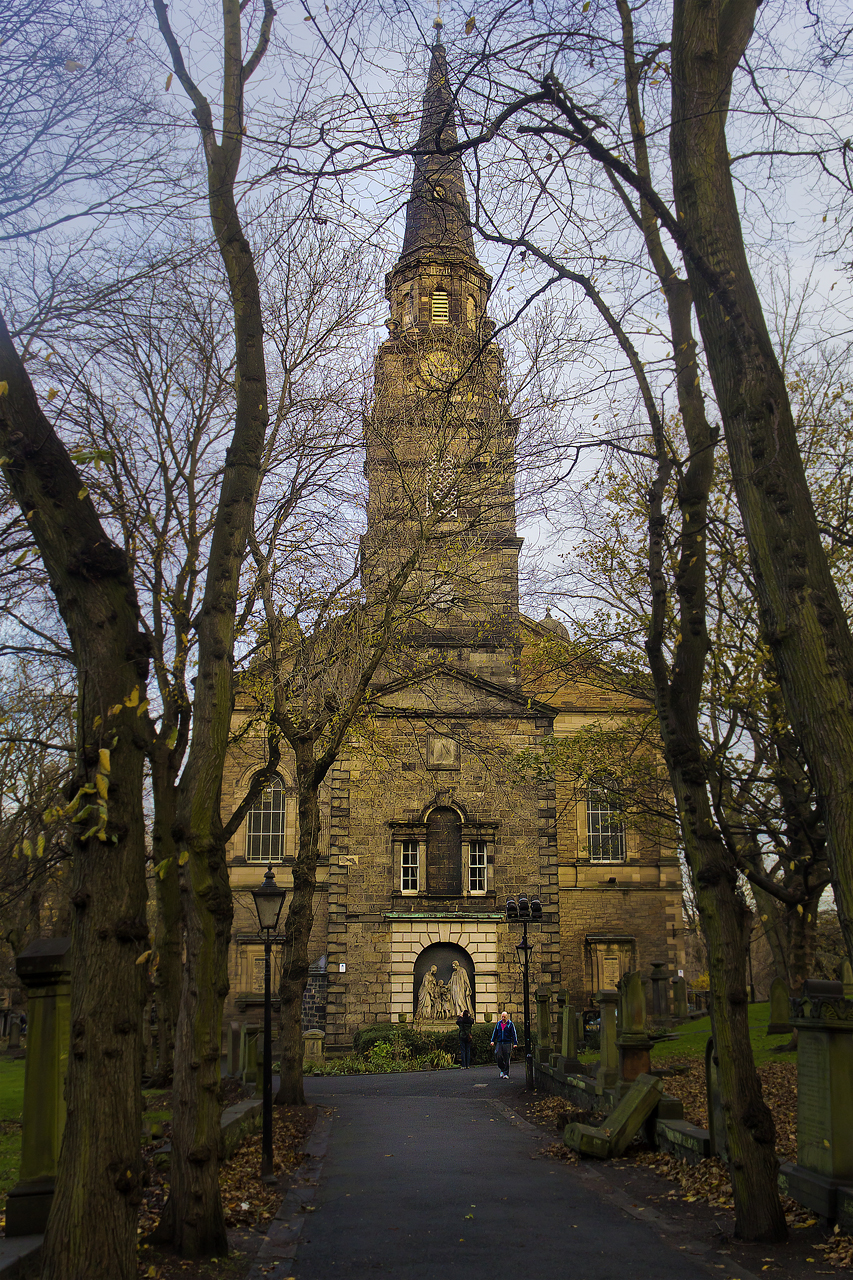
The west elevation

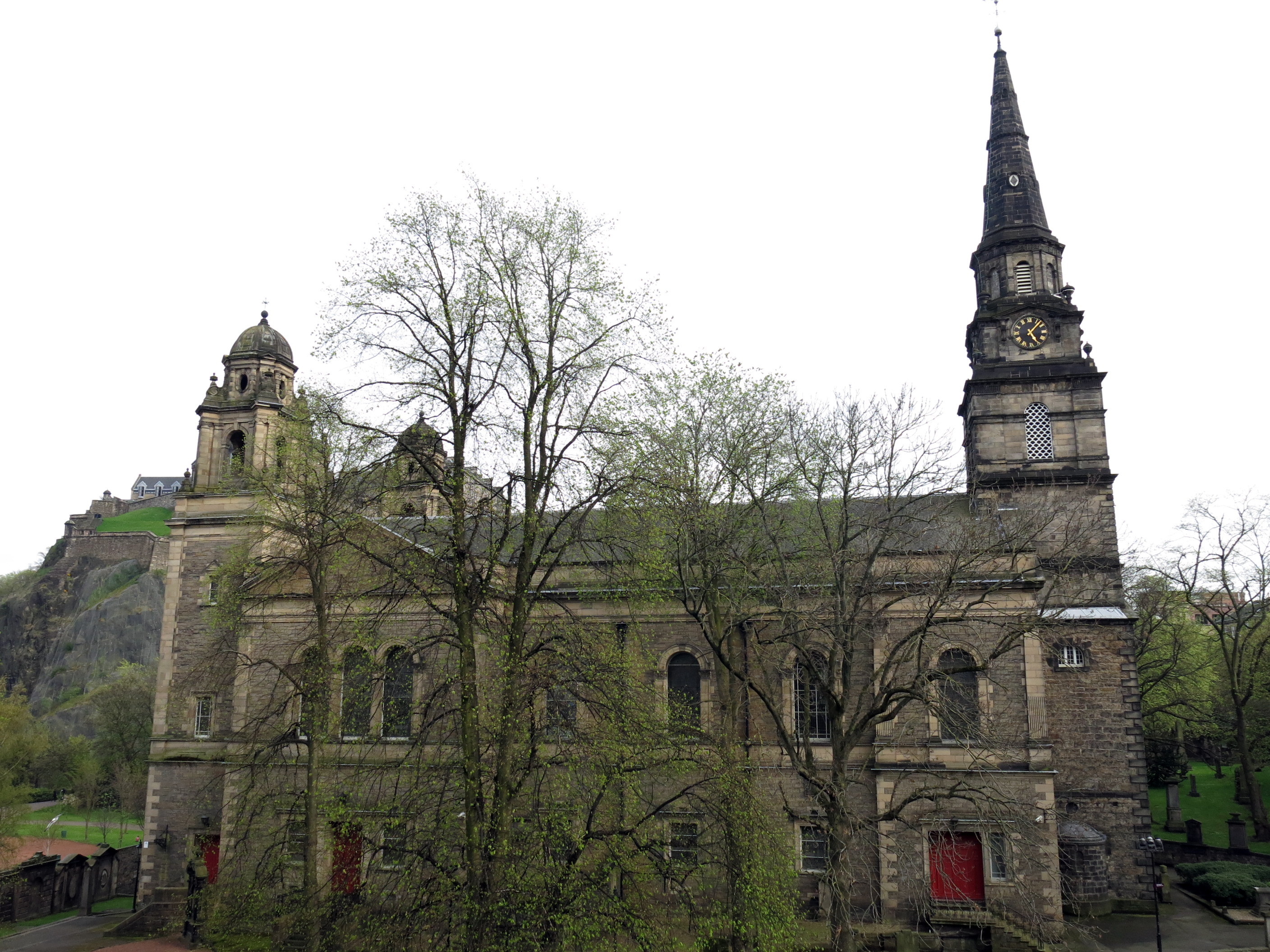
The north elevation

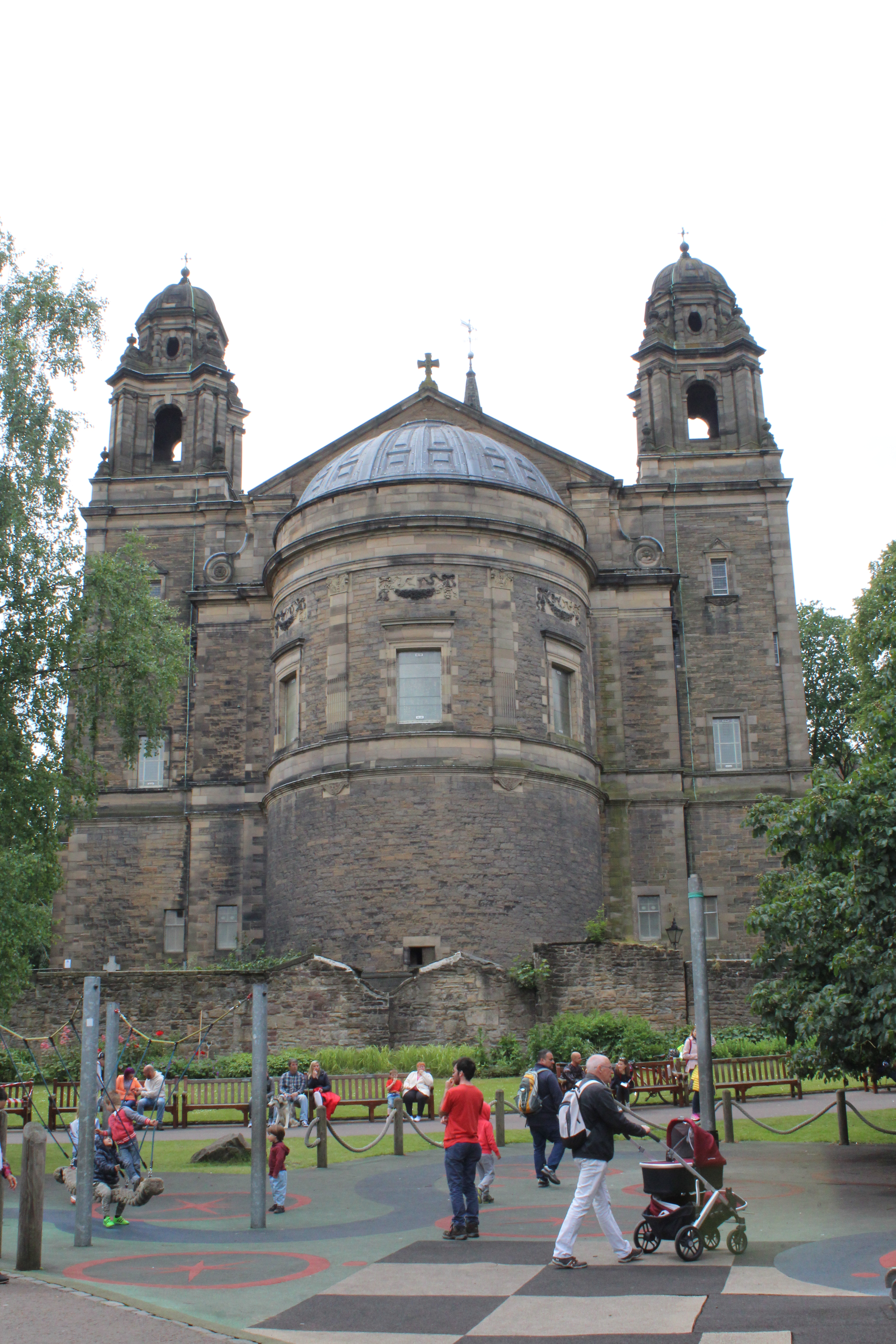
The east elevation, seen from Princes Street Gardens

==== Steeple ====
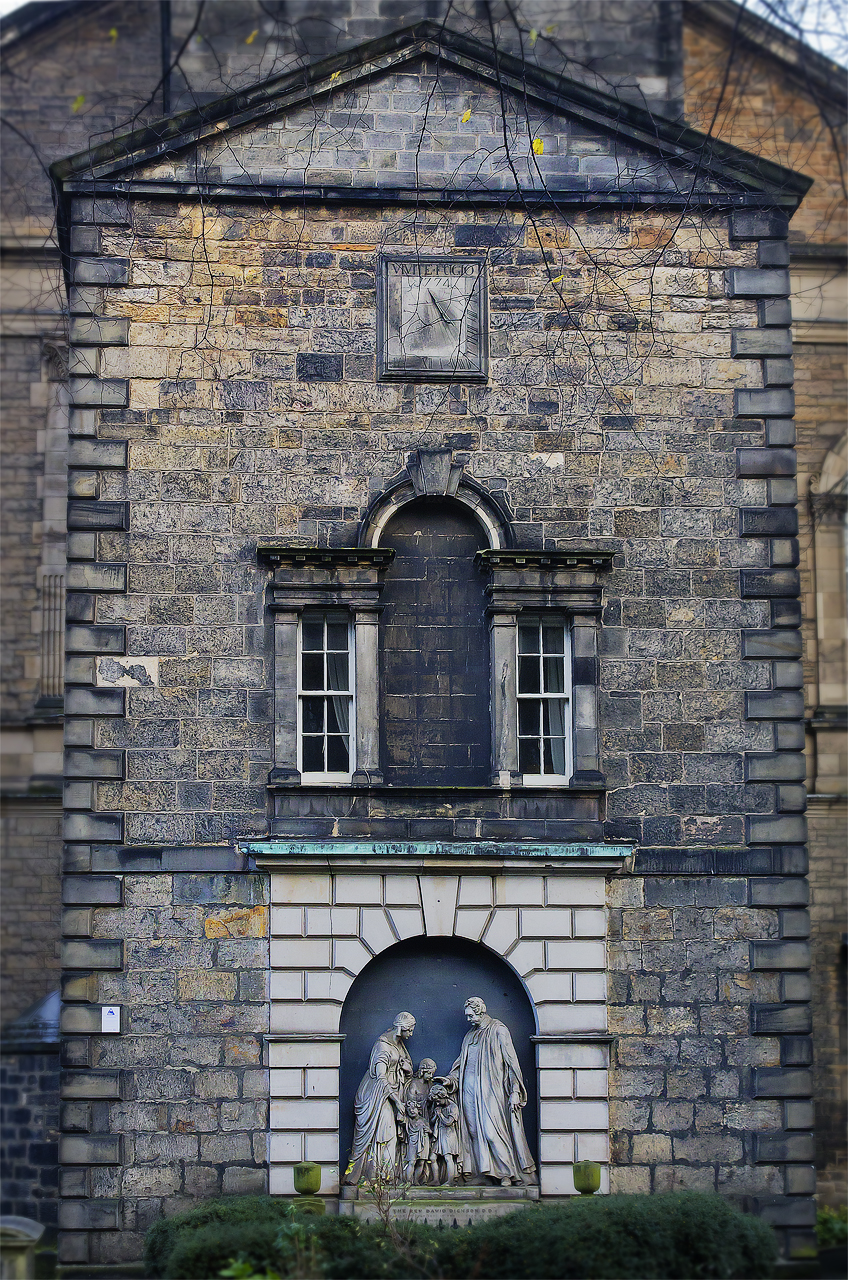
The base of the tower

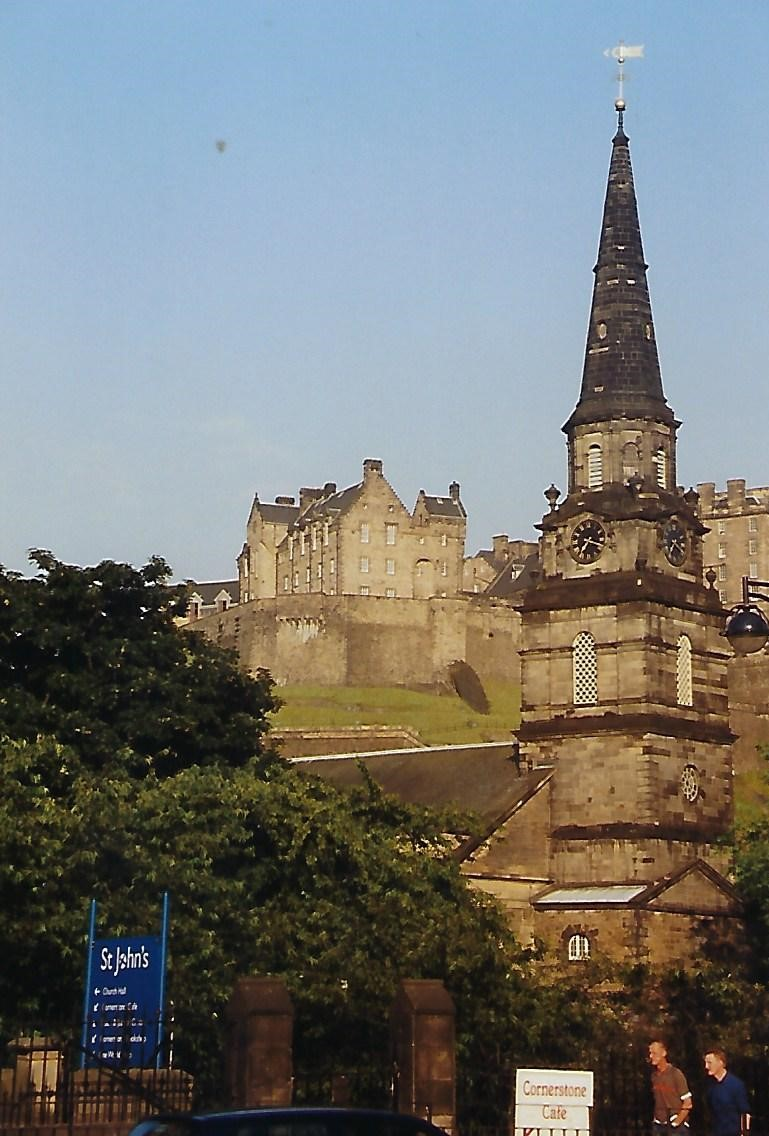
Alexander Stevens' steeple

The first stage of the tower's west elevation dates from James Weir's initial construction of the 1775 church; it is quoined and advances from the centre of the west gable. On the ground level, a channelled blind arch frames a large memorial sculpture of 1844 by Alexander Handyside Ritchie: this depicts David Dickson blessing children. Above the arch is a Venetian window with the central light blocked. The first stage of the tower terminates in a simple pediment, beneath whose entablature rests a sundial dated 1774. The apse of the war memorial chapel projects slightly from the north side of the ground floor of the tower.

Above the first stage, Alexander Stevens' steeple begins as a narrower extension of the tower. The steeple displays the influence of James Gibbs and Robert Adam; though a more immediate influence is William Sibbald's 1785 design for the spire of St Andrew's. The steeple's central position in the western gable helped to disguise the shallow pitch of the Georgian church's roof. The tower continues in stages divided by horizontal moulded bands. In the first stage, an oculus pierces the west elevation. In the second stage, the tower rises above the line of the roof with a round-arched, latticed window in each face. In the third stage are four pedimented clock faces dated 1789. Urns top the corners of the second and third stages. Above the third stage stands an octagonal belfry with round-arched louvres and Doric pilasters. The belfry bears an eight-faced spire, pierced by circular openings and capped with a weather vane.

==== Interior ====
The sanctuary consists of a wide nave with a flat, compartmented plaster ceiling. A U-shaped gallery, supported on marbled Corinthian columns, stands against the north, south, and west walls. Round-headed arches on Doric pilasters open into the transepts and chancel. The west gallery was shortened between 1989 and 1990, when Stewart Tod & Partners partitioned off the western end of the sanctuary to improve the church's facilities and disability accessibility. The ground floor became the Lammermuir Room with the Lindisfarne Room above while the upper storey of the south transept became the Nor' Loch Room.

The chancel consists of a semi-circular apse; three bays divided by Doric pilasters terminate in round-headed arches that nestle into the vault of the half-domed ceiling. Within each arch stands a window in a segmental-arched frame. Between the nave and the apse stands one bay with longitudinal round-headed arches under a compartmented barrelled ceiling. The chancel steps are marble with mosaic floors. In 1928, James Inch Morrison embellished the chancel by cladding the pilasters in orange marble with a cornice of Pavonazzo marble.

Peter MacGregor Chalmers remodelled the ground floor of the tower as a First World War memorial chapel, which opened in 1921. The chapel's barreled plaster ceiling is shallow and compartmented. The dado is panelled with marble slabs inlaid with the names of the parish's fallen in lead; the floor is also paved with marble. At the centre of the north wall, a round-headed arch beneath an oculus leads to a simple apse covered in gilded mosaic tiles and pierced by a small central window. The south wall is pierced by a segmental-arched window below an oculus. Above the chapel stands the session room and, above that, the wood-panelled choir room; the latter is accessed by screened cantilevered wooden staircases in upper the west vestibule.

Interior

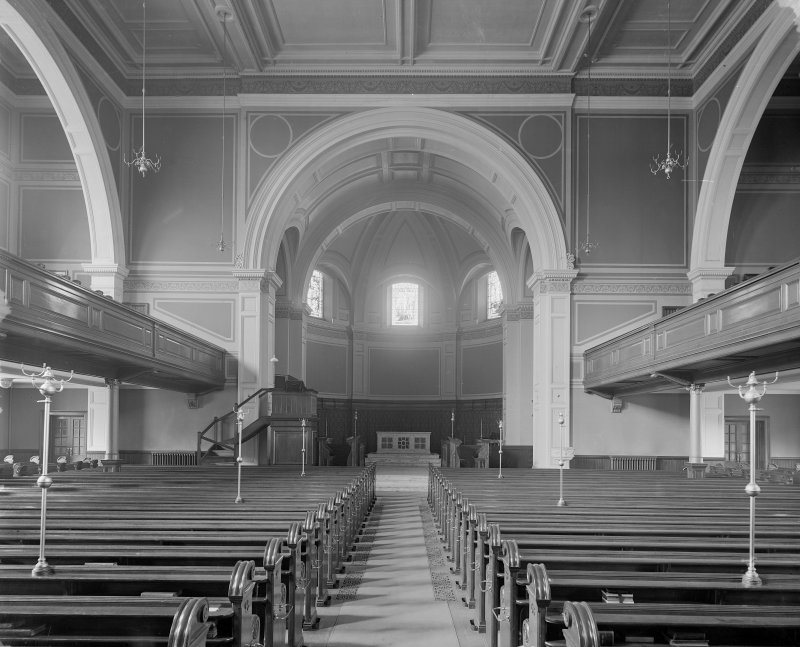
East view of the interior in 1895, the chancel was embellished in the following decades.

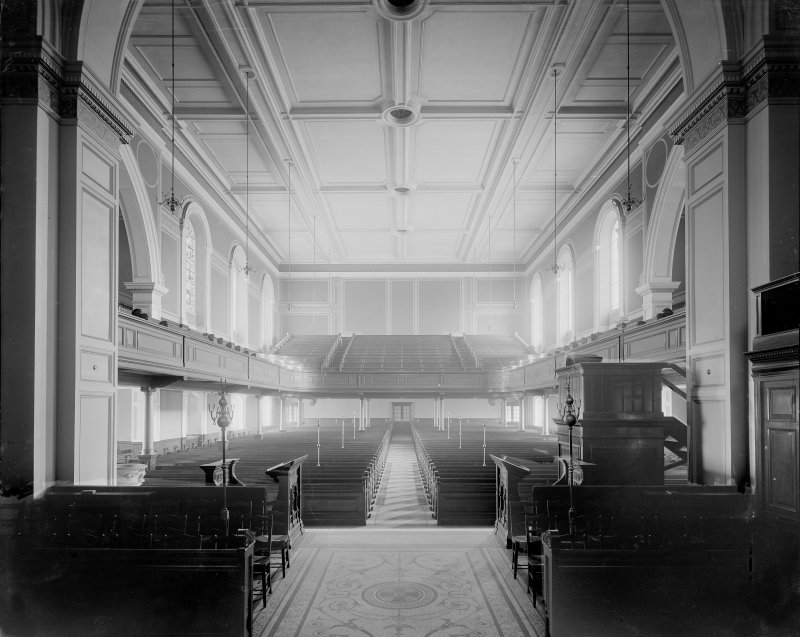
West view of the interior from the chancel in 1895, the west end was shortened in 1989–1990.

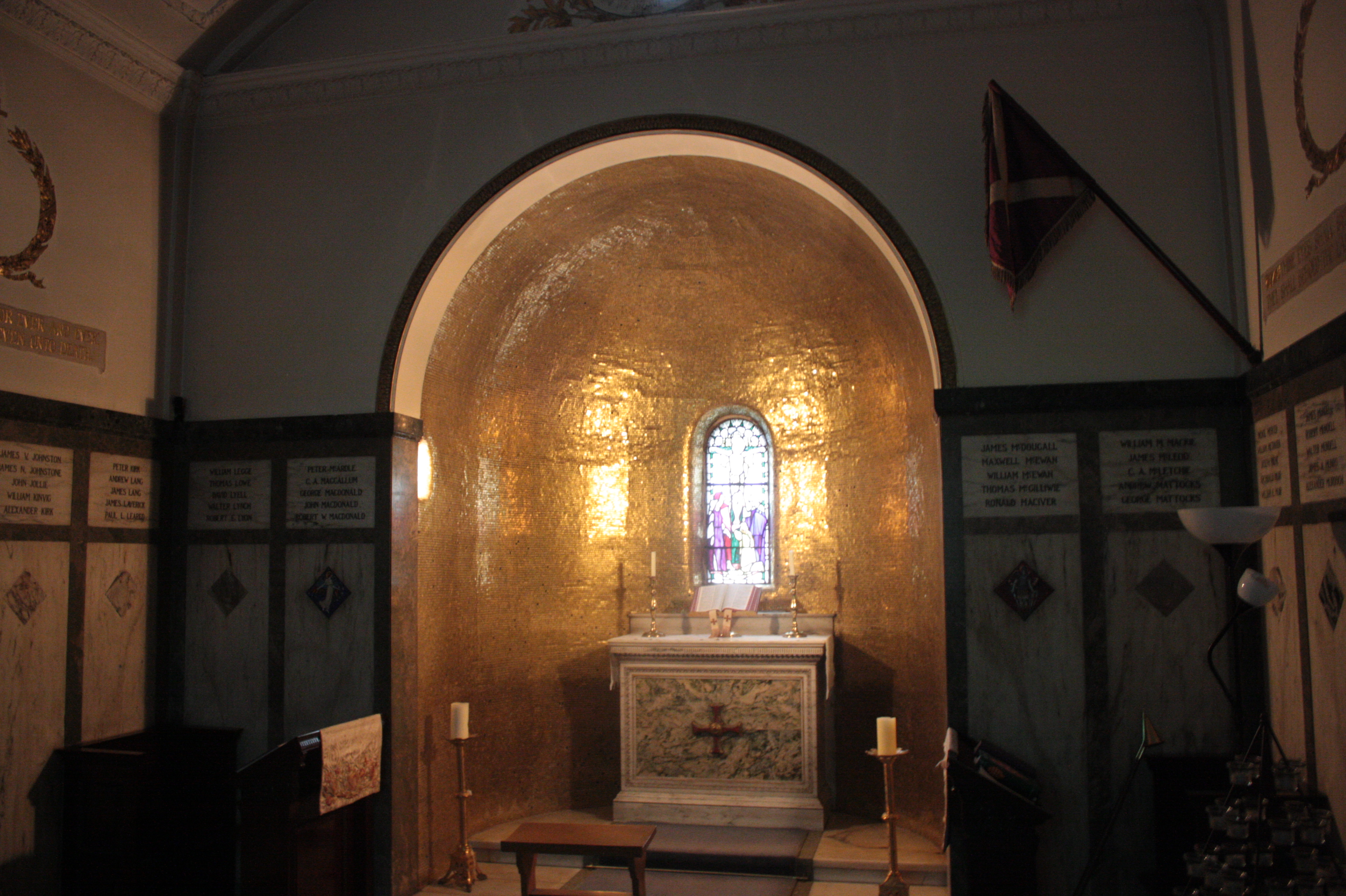
The war memorial chapel, designed by Peter MacGregor Chalmers.

==== Assessment ====
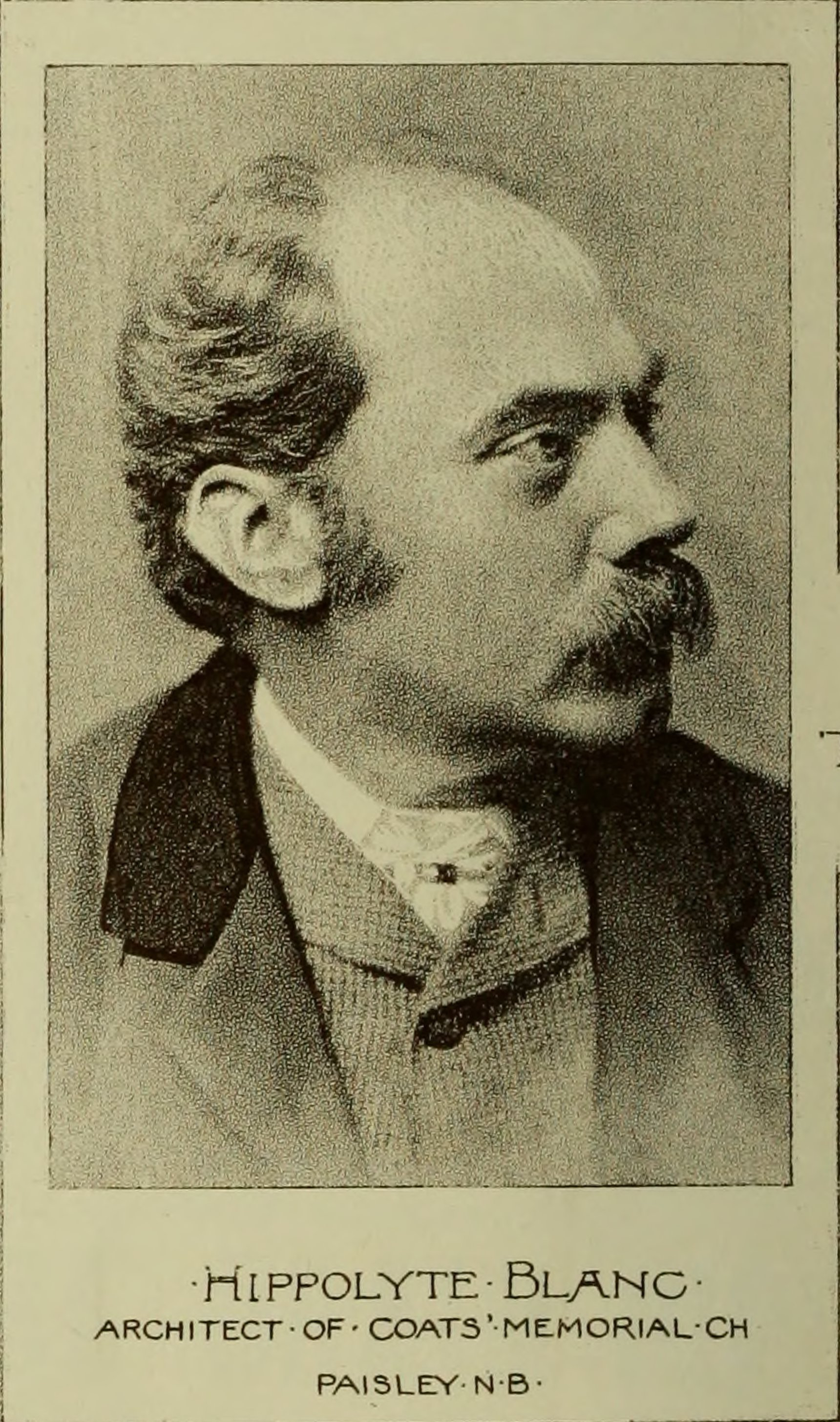
Hippolyte Blanc, architect of St Cuthbert's

While George Hay praised the Georgian steeple as a "charming composition", reception of Blanc's design has been mixed. As the church rose, the kirk session debated the appropriateness of the eastern towers. In the contemporary press, a Scotsman leader criticised the new church's proportions while the Edinburgh Evening Dispatch hailed the "worshipful feeling" the church inspired. Writing four decades after the church's construction, Andrew Landale Drummond contrasted the opulence of the chancel to the "inadequacy" of the nave, concluding: " ... the showy Baroque decoration of St. Cuthbert's is alien both to good taste and the traditions of Presbyterianism." Writing soon after Drummond, William Forbes Gray described the church as "handsome and ornate". The authors of the Buildings of Scotland guide to Edinburgh praise Blanc's interior but state that exterior views "show an uneasy compromise, for snecked stonework and C15-16 Renaissance detail do not suit the austere kirk style, and the great bulk and divergent roof pitch are at odds with the Georgian steeple." The authors do, however, praise the east elevation, "which succeeds by sheer swank".

The church has been Category A listed since 1970.

== Features ==
St Cuthbert's is notable for its ornate furnishings and decoration, many of which take inspiration from the Italian Renaissance. In the two decades after the current church opened in 1894, the features engendered controversy between those who praised their aesthetic qualities and those who believed such opulence was inappropriate in a Presbyterian church. New features were added throughout the 20th century.

=== Chancel furnishings ===
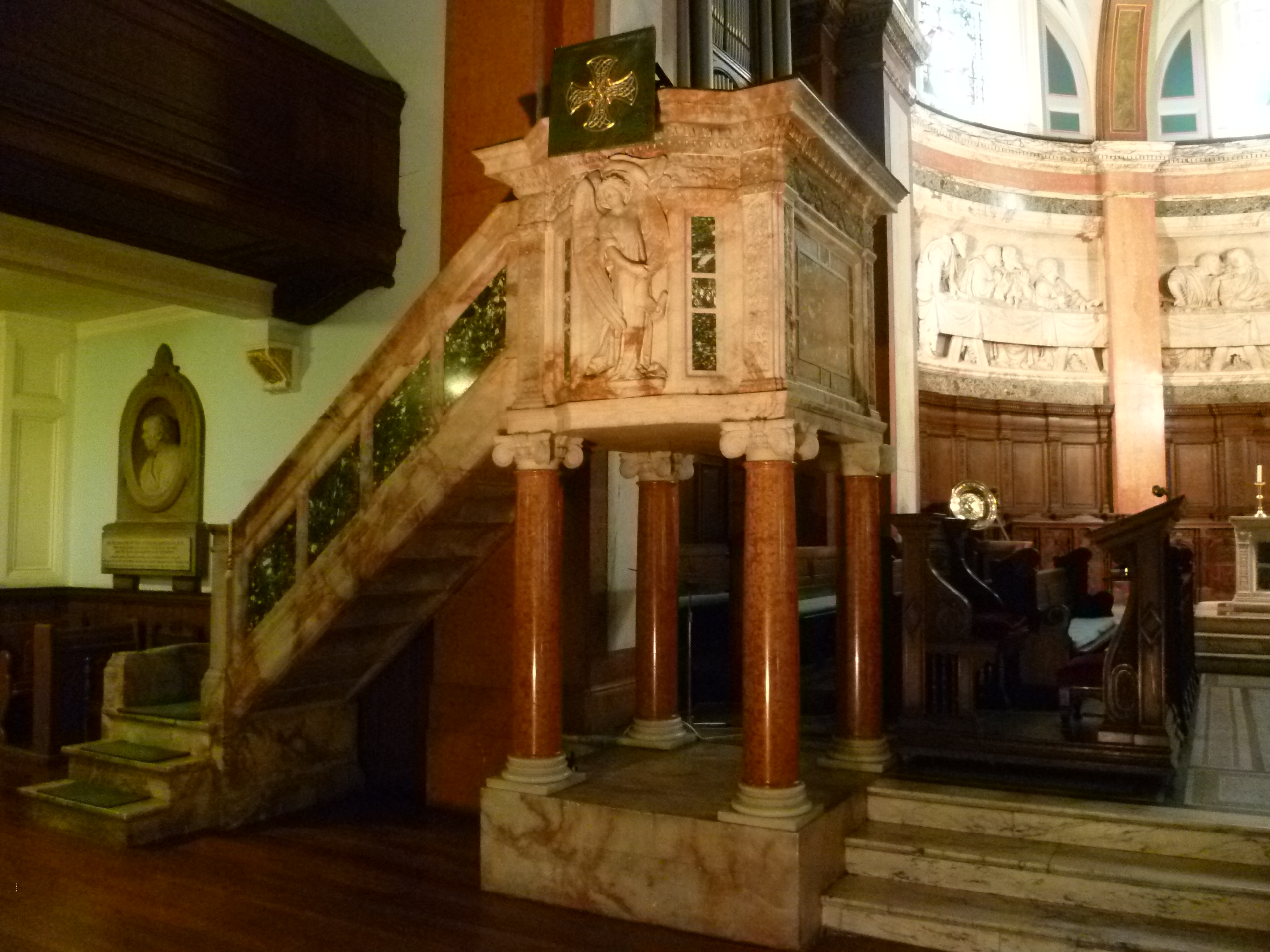
Pulpit of St Cuthbert's Church

The central focus of the east end of St Cuthbert's is the communion table, which was ready in time for the opening of the church in 1894. The table is white marble, its front is divided into three compartments by Corinthian pilasters. The central compartment contains a cross of Aventurine marble with a golden centre and porphyry infill. The cross imitates the cross found in Saint Cuthbert's tomb. Either side of the central compartment are compartments decorated with mother of pearl and lapis lazuli. Presbyterian churches have traditionally centred on the pulpit rather than the communion table and, shortly after its unveiling, the Glasgow Herald condemned the table as a "stone altar".

On the north side of the chancel arch stands the marble pulpit: designed by Hippolyte Blanc, the pulpit was installed in 1898 to replace an earlier wooden pulpit. The pulpit stands on four red marble pillars – quarried at Sant'Ambrogio near Verona – with white Ionic capitals. The body of the pulpit is panelled with verd antique; its central panel bears a relief carving of an angel. Beneath the pulpit, the church's foundation stone rests on fragments of Gothic masonry discovered during the demolition of the previous church. Next to the font stands the lectern in the form of a full-length bronze angel, sculpted by David Watson Stevenson and installed in 1895.

At the south side of the chancel arch stands the font, designed by Thomas Armstrong and installed in 1908. The font is hexagonal and executed in white marble with a bronze portrait relief by MacGill; the bowl is a trough surrounding a bronze sculpture of a mother and child, based on Michelangelo's Madonna of Bruges. Armstrong based the font's design on Jacopo della Quercia's font of Siena Cathedral. At its installation, the sculpture divided those who praised its aesthetic qualities and those who believed a Madonna to be inappropriate in a Presbyterian church. The matter was sufficiently controversial as to be discussed at the General Assembly in 1912.

Blanc designed the wooden chancel stalls. The choir stalls in the chancel have scroll-topped ends, similar to the pews of the nave. The elders' stalls in the apse display more elaborate Renaissance details.

=== Artwork ===
Above the wainscot, the walls of the apse are decorated with an alabaster frieze depicting the Last Supper. The frieze, installed in 1908, is divided across three bays; its design was adapted by Hippolyte Blanc from Leonardo's Last Supper and carved by Bridgeman of Lichfield.

In the panels of the chancel ceiling, murals by Gerald Moira depict the Four Evangelists while the vault of the apse is decorated with a scene of Christ in Majesty by Robert Hope. The spandrels of the chancel arch are decorated with angels painted by John Duncan in 1931. Moira also adorned the west wall of the nave above the gallery with a large mural of Saint Cuthbert on Lindisfarne. When the west end was shortened in 1990, the mural was retained as part of the Lindisfarne Room.

After the gallery of the south transept was walled-off in 1990 to create the Nor' Loch Room, a decorative screen designed by students of Edinburgh College of Art was added to the new wall.

=== Memorials ===
In the vestibule and stairwells, memorials include a vesica panel in memory of the children of Francis Redfern with a relief of Christ blessing children by John Flaxman (1802); a Mannerist tablet to John Napier (1842); aedicules to Rocheid of Inverleith (1737) and Watson of Muirhouse (1774); a pair of wall sarcophagi on lion's feet by Wallace and Whyte commemorating Henry Moncreiff-Wellwood and William Paul (1841); and a stone marker from the grave of Robert Pont (1608).

To the left of the chancel arch stands a bust of John Paul (died 1872) by William Brodie. To the right of the chancel arch rests the Art Nouveau McLaren Memorial with a low relief portrait by George Frampton (1907). Under the north gallery, there is a Renaissance tablet to Alexander Ballantine by Arthur Forman Balfour Paul. At the western entrance to the nave stands the Second World War memorial by Ian Gordon Lindsay (1950); the memorial consists of Renaissance wooden screens which list the names of the 50 members of the congregation killed during the conflict.

=== Stained glass ===
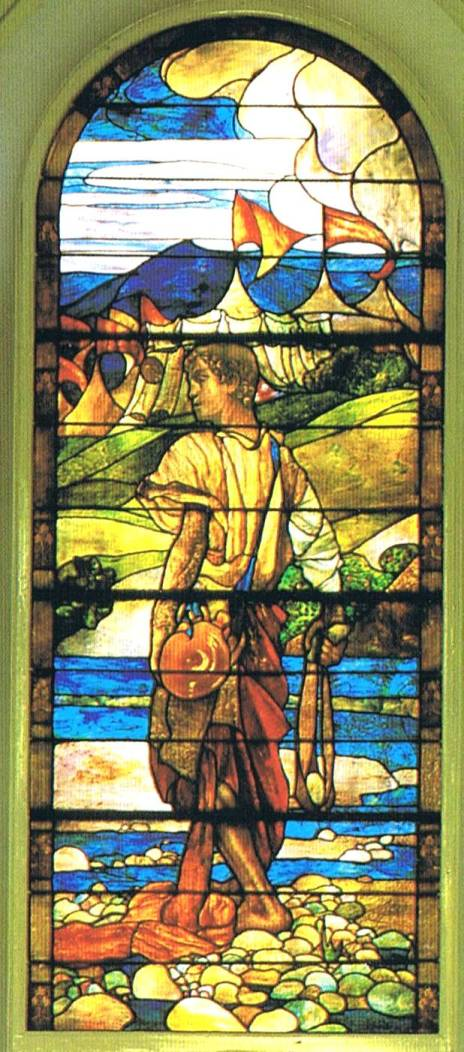
David going to meet Goliath – Tiffany stained glass window in St Cuthbert's Church.

In 1893, the Kirk Session decided approved the addition of stained glass windows and decided upon "a general and harmonious scheme of scriptural subjects applying to whole church". Almost all were installed between 1893 and 1912 by the Edinburgh firm Ballantyne & Gardiner and depict biblical scenes within early-Renaissance tabernacle frames. The windows of the north side depict scenes from the Old Testament with scenes from the New Testament on the south side. The windows of the apse depict the Crucifixion, Last Supper, and the Nativity. In the north transept, windows depict Ninian, Columba, and Aidan while the windows of the south transept show scenes in the life of Cuthbert. Windows by other makers show David going out to meet Goliath, by Tiffany Glass Company (after 1900), and, in the war memorial chapel, the Crucifixion and Cuthbert by Douglas Strachan (1922).

=== Pipe organ ===
The organ of St Cuthbert's was donated in 1899 by Robert Cox and built by Robert Hope-Jones of Birkenhead. The pipes were initially arrayed on either side of the chancel in cases designed by Hippolyte Blanc, architect of the church. The organ was rebuilt and expanded in 1928 by Hill, Norman, and Beard. Between 1956 and 1957, the organ was re-worked and expanded with the addition of an extra case in the north transept by Ian Gordon Lindsay. The organ was reconstructed between 1997 and 1998 by J. W. Walker & Sons of Brandon and the cases were restored. J.W. Walker & Sons carried out further alterations in 2002. The present organ possesses four manuals and 67 speaking stops.

=== Bells, clock and plate ===
The church tower houses a ring of ten bells by Taylor of Loughborough. The first eight were made in 1902 with another two added in 1970. The clock by James Ritchie was installed in 1902 with chimes that strike Westminster quarters. An Ellacombe chiming apparatus was also added in 1902 for one person to chime all eight bells. A redundant bell of 1791 is displayed in the vestibule.

The bells were initially rung by young men of the congregation under the direction of W.C.S. Heathcote, who served until his death in 1950. During the First World War, women took the male ringers' places. On 28 June 1919, the bells accompanied a 101 gun salute from Edinburgh Castle to mark the signing of the Treaty of Versailles. The sound of the bells was broadcast on 15 November 1942 as they rang out to mark victory in the Second Battle of El Alamein: this was the first time the bells had sounded since the outbreak of war in 1939.

The church possesses eight modern silver patens and 25 chalices of various ages, the oldest of which are dated 1619. There are four silver flagons of 1702 and two of 1881. Two silver basins for baptisms were purchased in 1701. Two alms dishes are dated 1618 and are supplemented by four smaller patens of later date; a further two alms dishes date to the First World War.

== Worship and ministry ==
=== Ministers ===
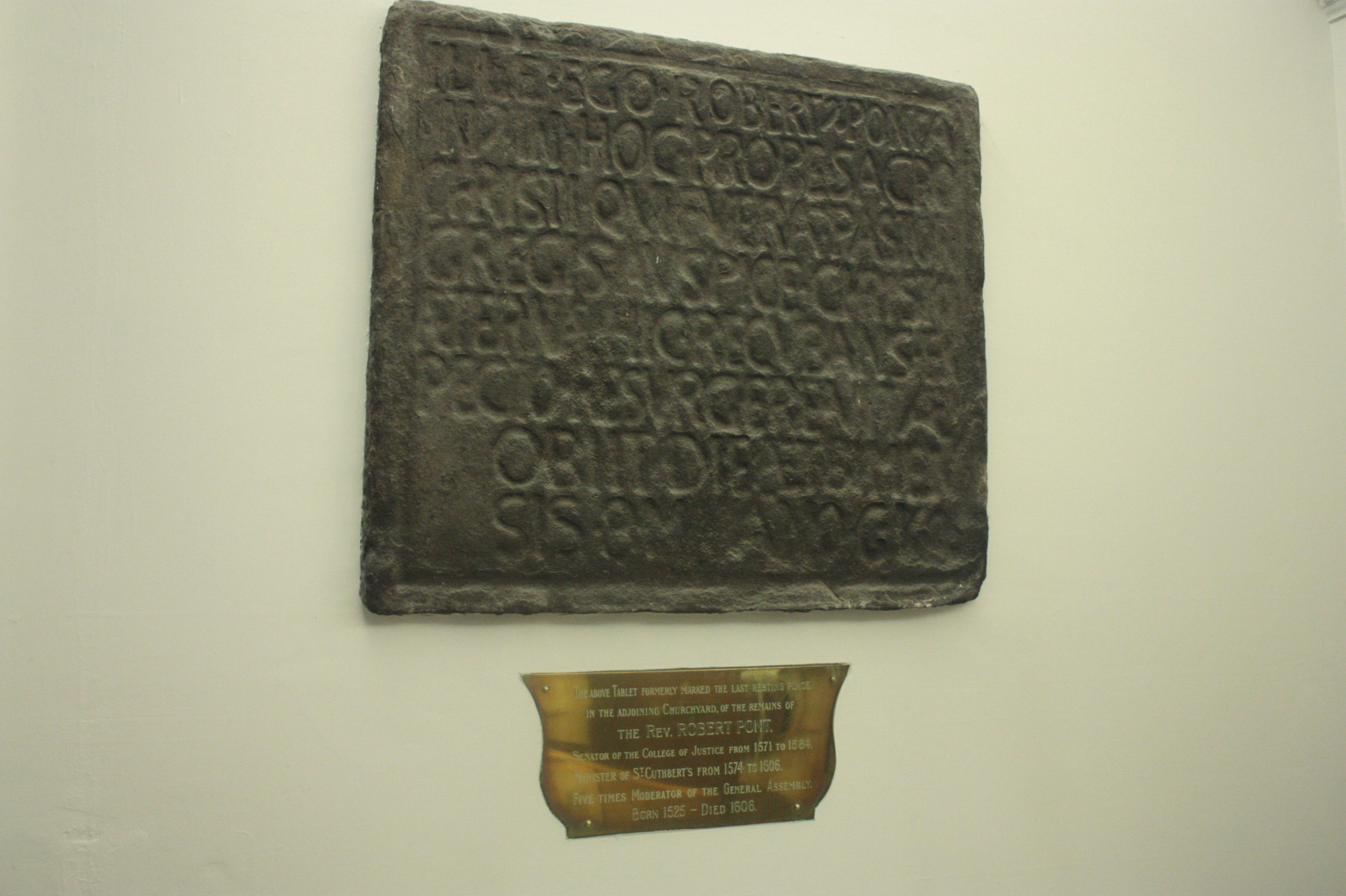
Grave marker of Robert Pont, a notable early Protestant minister of St Cuthbert's

The Parish is currently vacant, with Dr Hazel Hastie acting as Interim Modertor, and the Revd Suzie Stark (who was ordained in St Cuthbert's) acting as Locum Minister.

Until February 2025, the Revd Dr Peter Sutton was minister of St Cuthbert's, having been inducted in on 1 June 2017. Sutton served with the Black Watch then worked in education, serving as chaplain of Gordonstoun, the Perse School, and Loretto School and as headmaster of Ardvreck School.

In 1251, David de Bernham, bishop of St Andrews annexed the parsonage of St Cuthbert's to Holyrood Abbey and it became a perpetual vicarage, usually held by one of Holyrood's canons. By the 15th century, chaplains served the church's multiple subsidiary altars.

From the Scottish Reformation in 1560, the first Protestant minister of St Cuthbert's was William Harlaw. Born after 1500, Harlaw had been a tailor in the Canongate before he embraced the Reformation and moved to England, where he became a chaplain to Edward VI; after Edward's death in 1553, Harlaw returned to Scotland, where he preached despite persecution. In 1574, Harlaw was joined by Robert Pont, who had been appointed a senator of the College of Justice in 1572.

Robert Pont's appointment established a collegiate office of two ministers in one charge. From 1574, the senior minister was paid £100 a year while the junior minister received £67, 18s, 8d. At David Williamson's death in 1706, the salaries were equalised; however, the kirk session rejected Williamson's bequest of a manse for the junior minister. From 1956, Robert Leonard Small served as the sole minister while an act of the General Assembly allowed for associate ministers to be appointed during Small's incumbency. At Small's demission in 1975, a further act of the General Assembly ended the associate charge. Between 1690 and 1874, right to nominate ministers lay with the Crown.

William Harlaw and Robert Pont were members of the Church of Scotland's first General Assembly in 1560. Pont served as the General Assembly's moderator in 1570 and again, during his incumbency at St Cuthbert's, in 1575, 1581, 1583, 1596, and 1597. Later ministers who served as moderator of the General Assembly during their incumbency of St Cuthbert's are David Williamson in 1702; John Paul in 1847; James MacGregor in 1891; Norman Maclean in 1927; William White Anderson in 1951; and Robert Leonard Small in 1966.

Ministers of the senior charge

- 1560–1578 William Harlaw
- 1578–1602 Robert Pont
- 1603–1625 Richard Dickson
- 1626–1649 William Arthur
- 1649–1664 James Reid
- 1665–1680 William Gordon
- 1680–1689 Patrick Hepburn
- 1689–1706 David Williamson
- 1706–1726 Thomas Paterson
- 1726–1730 George Wishart
- 1732 Patrick Wedderspoon
- 1734–1735 James Dawson
- 1735–1751 Thomas Pitcairn
- 1752–1761 John Hyndman
- 1762–1775 Alexander Stuart
- 1775–1827 Henry Moncreiff-Wellwood
- 1828–1873 John Paul
- 1873–1910 James MacGregor
- 1910–1914 George Gordon Dundas Stewart Duncan
- 1914–1925 Robert Howie Fisher
- 1926–1930 George Fielden Macleod
- 1931–1956 William White Anderson

Ministers of the collegiate charge

- 1574–1578 Robert Pont
- 1581–1586 Nicol Dalgleish
- 1586–1606 William Aird
- 1607–1626 William Arthur
- 1630–1649 James Reid
- 1653–1661 Peter Blair
- 1661–1665 David Williamson
- 1666–1675 William Keith
- 1677–1681 Charles Kay
- 1682–1686 Alexander Sutherland
- 1687–1689 David Guild
- 1691–1699 John Anderson
- 1699–1706 Thomas Paterson
- 1707–1747 Neil McVicar
- 1747–1752 George Kay
- 1753–1764 James Mackie Moderator in 1751
- 1765–1785 John Gibson
- 1786–1802 William Paul
- 1803–1842 David Dickson
- 1843–1877 James Veitch
- 1878–1883 James Barclay
- 1884–1910 Andrew Wallace Williamson
- 1911–1914 William Lyall Wilson
- 1915–1937 Norman Maclean
- 1938–1955 Adam Wilson Burnett

Sole charge

- 1956–1975 Robert Leonard Small
- 1976–2007 Thomas Cuthbertson Cuthell
- 2008–2016 David Denniston
- 2017–2025 Peter Sutton

=== Services and music ===
St Cuthbert's holds two services every Sunday: Communion at 9.30am; morning service at 10.30am followed by Communion on the second Sunday of the month and including Communion on the last Sunday of the month, a formal Communion service also takes place every quarter. Communion is also celebrated at noon on the second Tuesday of the month.

The 10.30am Sunday service is accompanied by the St Cuthbert's Choir, whose membership consists of volunteer members of the congregation and choral scholars. The Director of Music is Graham Maclagan.

=== Mission ===
St Cuthbert's works with homelessness charity, Steps to Hope, to provide a free meal for up to 100 homeless people every Sunday in St Cuthbert's Hall with a night shelter for 12 afterwards.

St Cuthbert's also operates OASIS: a ministry among Edinburgh's business community. OASIS works with Workplace Chaplaincy Scotland and the charity Business Matters. As part of this ministry, the church hosts "Soul Space": a series of reflections during the afternoon and evening of the first Wednesday of each month; "Space for Lunchtime Prayers" is also offered every Thursday at 1 p.m.

Alongside St Andrew's and St George's West Parish Church and St John's Episcopal Church, St Cuthbert's is part of Edinburgh City Centre Churches Together: an ecumenical grouping of churches that co-operates on missionary and charitable work.

St Cuthbert's serves as a performance venue during the Edinburgh Festival Fringe. The church is open to visitors from April to September between 10 a.m. and 3:30 p.m. Tuesday to Friday and between 10 a.m. and 1 p.m. on Saturdays.

The work and mission of the church has been supported by the Friends of St Cuthbert's since 2002.

== The churchyard ==
The original burial ground was restricted to an area to the south-west, now a small mound in relation to the rest of the churchyard. It was latterly known as the "Bairns' Knowe" (children's hill) as it was often used for burial of children. Records show that it was open to the countryside until 1597, and sheep and horses would graze there, after which a wall was then built around the churchyard.

In 1701, ground was added to the west and north-west, concurrent with a refurbishment of the church, which is recorded as having been somewhat derelict since the period of the English Civil War.

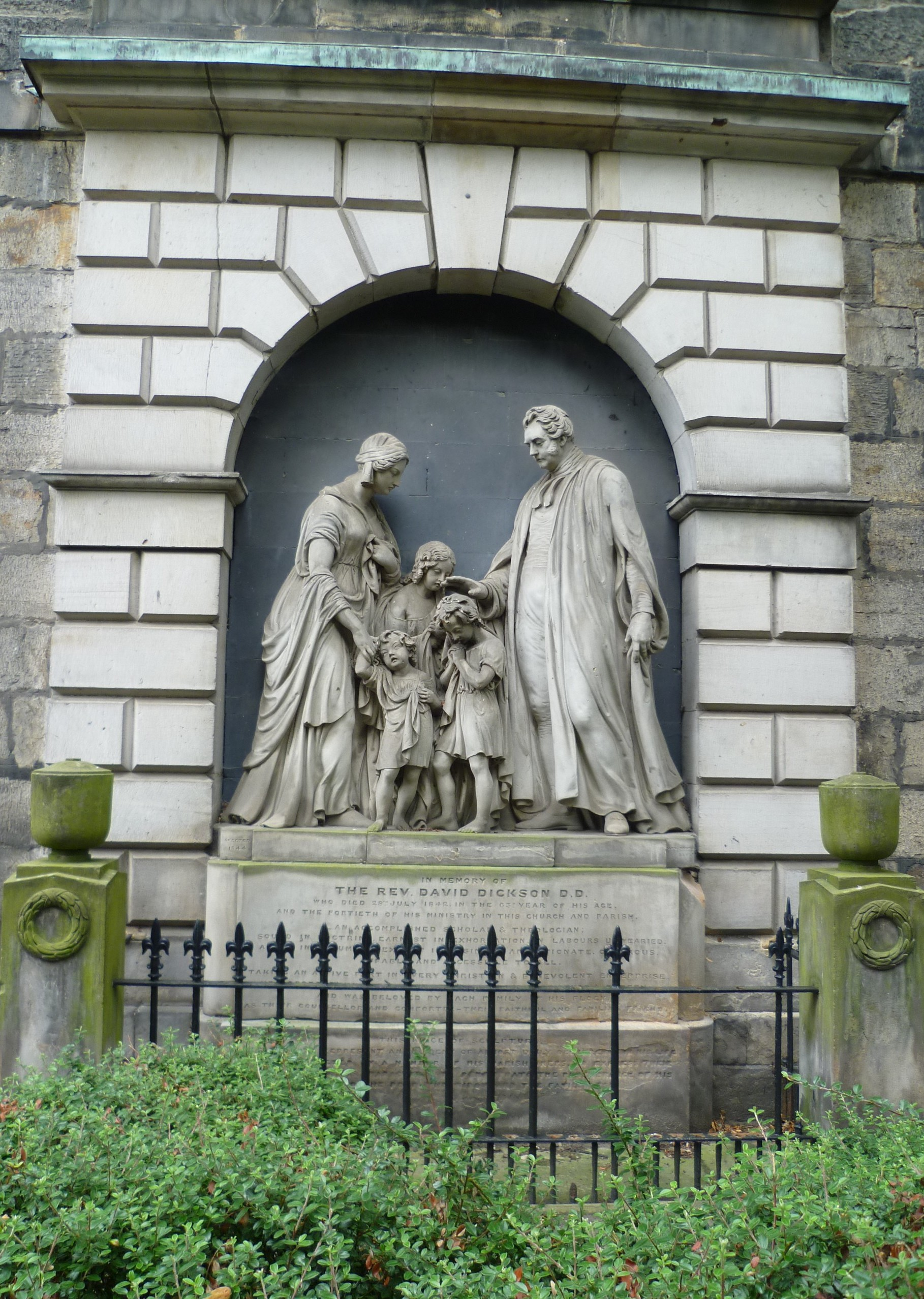
Memorial to the Rev David Dickson (c.1840) by Alexander Handyside Ritchie.

In 1787, the north marsh (at the west end of what was then the Nor' Loch) was drained, immediately north of the church, to expand the area for burial. A little later the ground to the south-east was raised to drier levels and enclosed on its east side by a new wall.

In 1827, the watchtower to the south-west was built to defend against grave robbing which was rife at that time.

In 1831, the manse (to the south) was demolished, and a new manse and garden built further south.

In 1841, a railway tunnel to serve incoming trains to the new Waverley Station was built under a new southern section of the graveyard, which dated from only 1834, and many graves had to be moved as a result. Stones from between 1834 and 1841 in that section have been lost or destroyed.

In 1863, the entire churchyard was closed under order of the newly appointed Medical Officer of Health, the graveyard being then considered "completely full". The church, however, refused to cease burials, considering it a viable and important source of income. In 1873, the church, in a rare event, was taken to court for "permitting a nuisance to exist (as defined) under the Public Health Act 1867, being offensive and injurious to health". That still did not effect a closure and, in 1874, the church was ordered to close by the council (then known as the City Corporation), but only did so after a year of further appeals.

The churchyard is impressive, containing hundreds of monuments worthy of notice, including one to John Grant of Kilgraston (near Perth), and a three-bay Gothic mausoleum of the Gordons of Cluny, by David Bryce.

One odd feature is at the west side of the churchyard, where Lothian Road was widened over the churchyard in 1930 by the City Architect, Ebenezer James MacRae. Because the road was higher than the churchyard, the widening was supported on pillars, with the graves remaining beneath the road surface. The eastern pavement of the road therefore traverses those graves.

=== Noteworthy burials ===
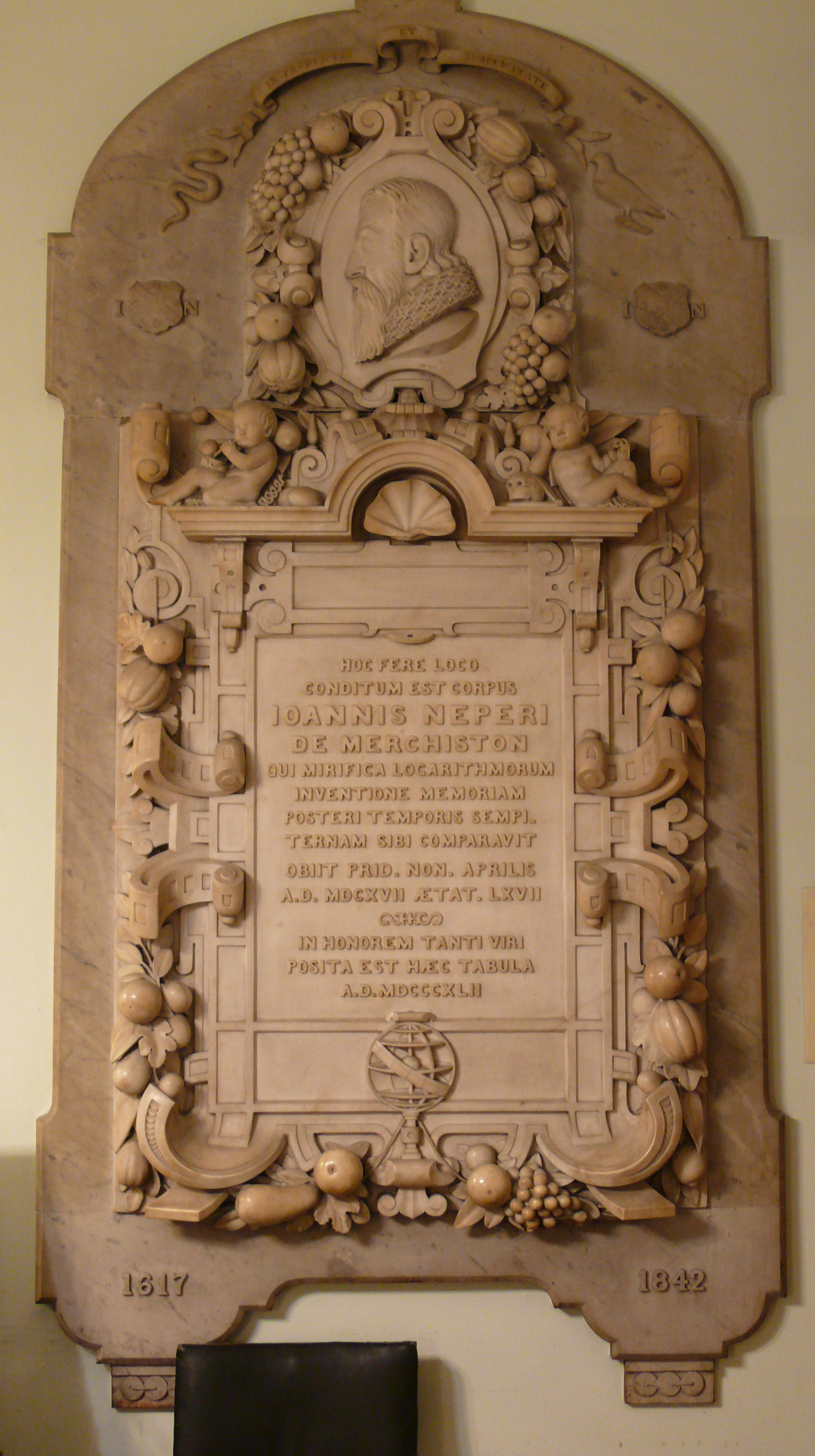
Memorial to John Napier

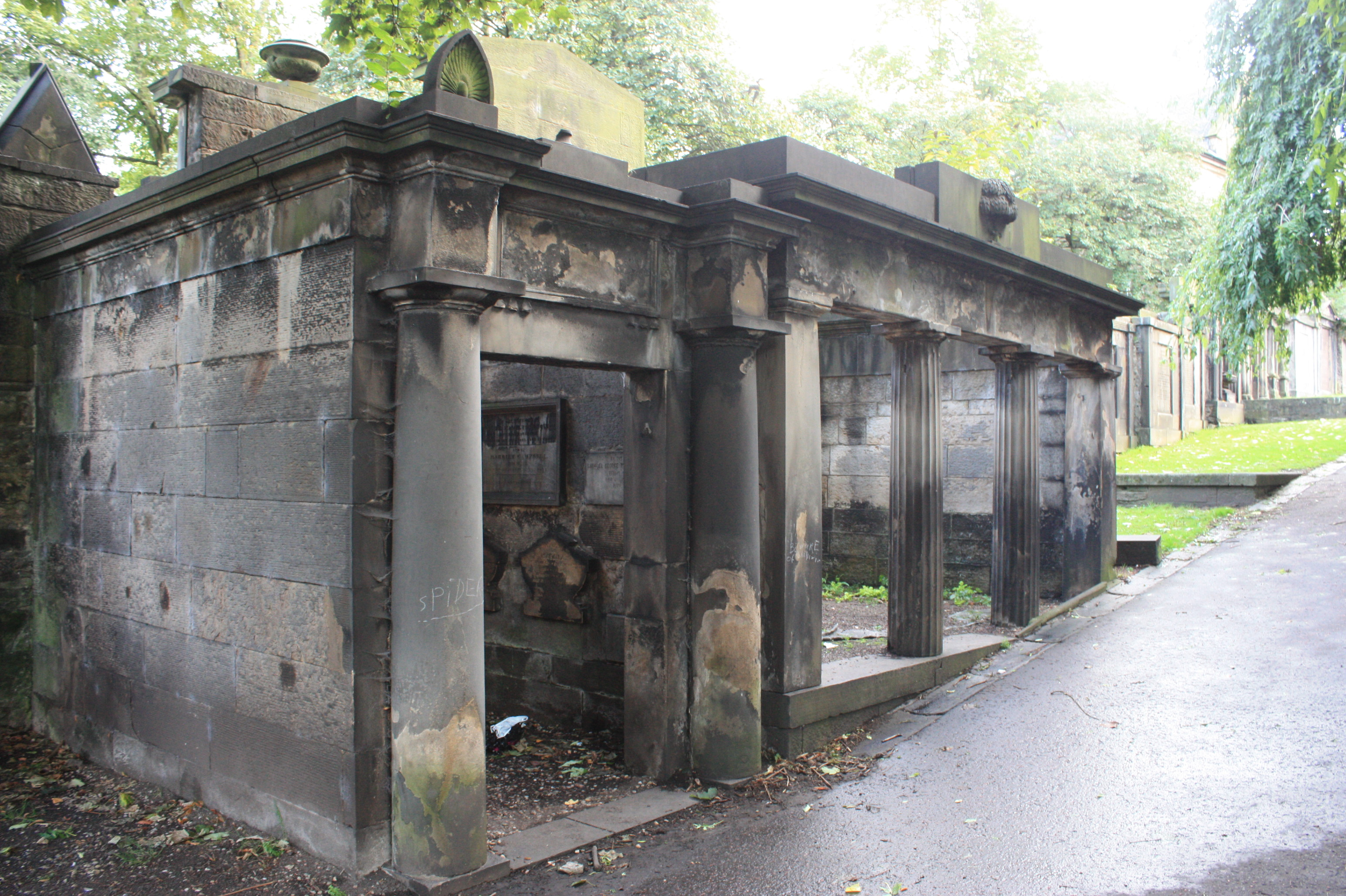
The Hamilton vault, St Cuthbert's Churchyard, Edinburgh

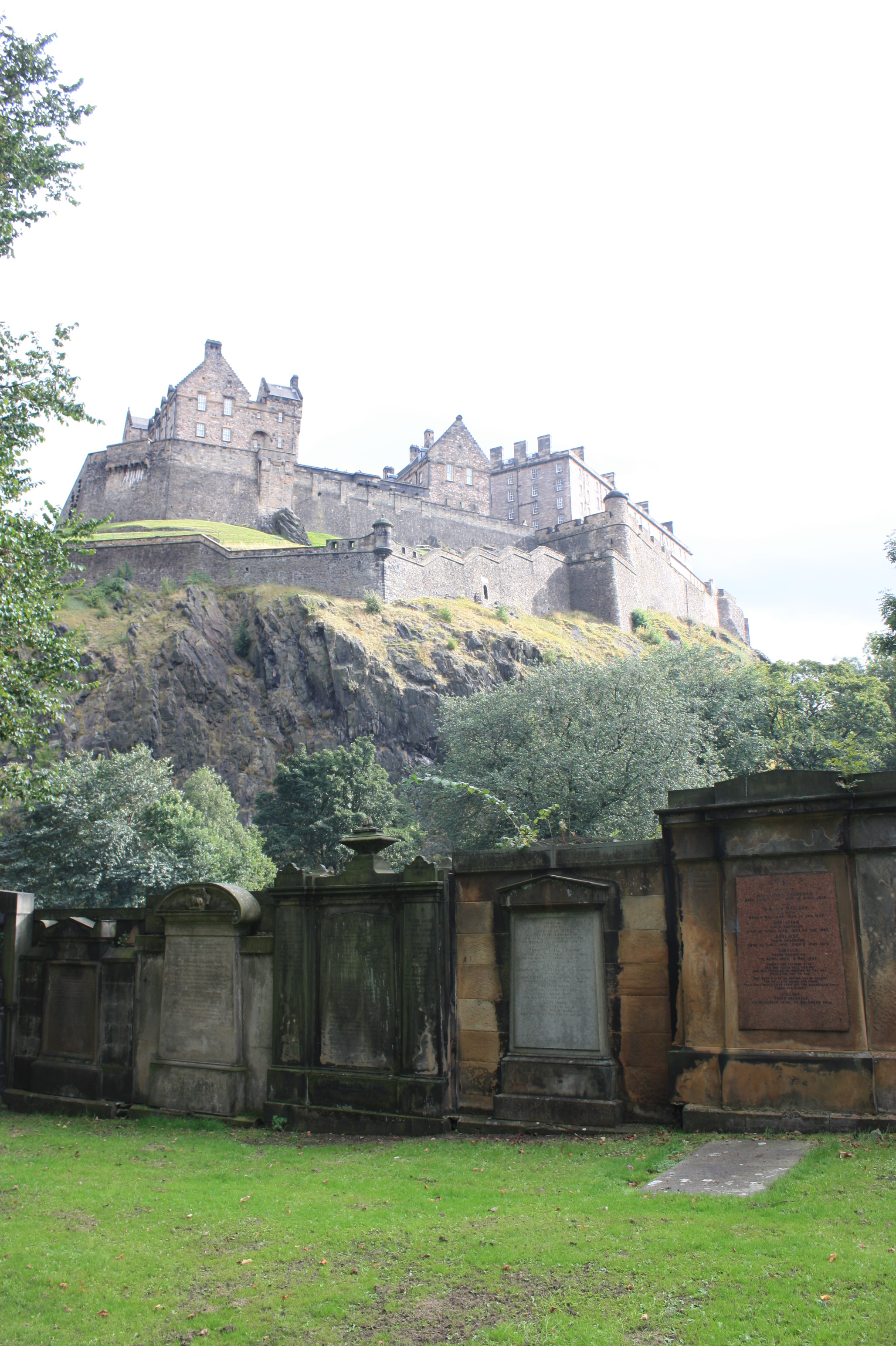
St Cuthbert's Churchyard looking towards Edinburgh Castle

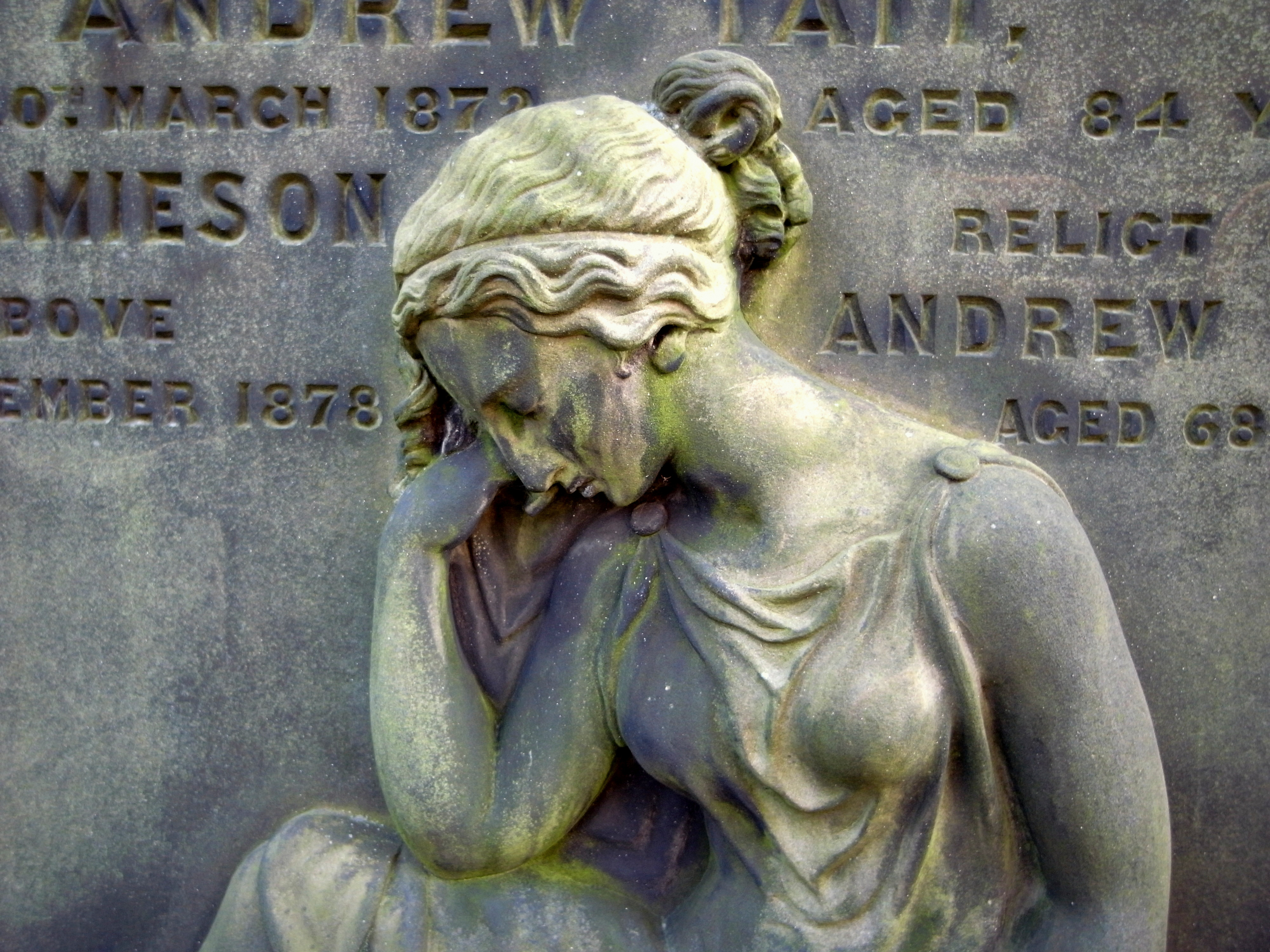
St. Cuthbert's Churchyard. Grave of Tait Family. Detail, 19th century

==== 17th and 18th centuries ====
- Henrie Nisbet of Dean (died 1609), buried beneath the church (tomb built 1592 in anticipation)Provost of Edinburgh in 1592/93 plus his son, William Nisbet of Dean twice Provost of Edinburgh 1615-19 and 1622–23
- John Napier (1550–1617) of Merchiston, inventor of logarithms, is buried in an underground vault on the north side of the church (reburied after destruction of the kirkyard of St Giles to build Parliament House)
- The Rev David Williamson (1636–1706), known in Scots songs as "Dainty Davie". He was ousted from the church in 1665 as a Covenanter. He then served as a captain on the rebel side at the Battle of Bothwell Bridge (1679). He was restored as minister of St. Cuthbert's in 1689 and then rose to be moderator of the General Assembly in 1702.
- Charles Darwin (1758–1778), uncle of the naturalist Charles Darwin, was a talented medical student but fell ill and was buried in the Duncan family vault at the Chapel of Ease on the South side of the city, now known as the Buccleuch Parish Church Burying Ground.
- Sir James Rocheid of Inverleith (1715–1787) (within the church)
- Alexander Gordon, Lord Rockville (1739–1792)
- Alexander Murray, Lord Henderland (1736–1795), and his son, John Murray, Lord Murray (1778–1858), a huge monument north of the church.
- James Erskine, Lord Alva (1722–1796)
- The 15th Earl of Glencairn (1749–1796)
- Cosmo Gordon of Cluny FRSE (1736–1800) politician and co-founder of the Royal Society of Edinburgh in 1783
- the Rev James MacKnight DD (1721–1800), religious author and Moderator of the General Assembly of the Church of Scotland in 1769
- Professor James Robertson (1714–1795)

==== 19th century ====
- Alexander Hamilton (Scottish physician) FRSE (1739–1802) and his son James Hamilton (Scottish physician) FRSE (1767–1839) both Professors of Medicine and Midwifery at Edinburgh University
- The Rev William Paul (1754–1802), Chaplain in Ordinary to George III (in church)
- Sir John Ogilvy of Inverquharity (1722–1802)
- Thomson Bonar (1739–1814), co-founder of Encyclopædia Britannica
- Richard Crichton (1771–1817), architect
- Adam Rolland of Gask (1734–1819), judge, and his grandson James Rolland
- Thomas Morison (1761–1820), builder of large sections of the Second New Town (north of Queen Street Gardens) and founder of Morison's Academy in Crieff
- George Winton (1759–1822) builder (the largest monument in the churchyard)
- Henry Dewar (1771–1823)
- Sir Henry Raeburn (1756–1823), artist
- Alexander Kennedy (physician) (1764–1827)
- David Steuart (1747–1828) Lord Provost of Edinburgh 1780 to 1782
- Rear Admiral James Haldane Tait (1771–1845)
- Robert Archibald Smith (1780–1829), composer
- The Rev Andrew Mitchell Thomson DD (1779–1831)
- Thomas Allan (1777–1833), mineralogist
- Thomas Sivright FRSE (1783–1835) art and book collector
- George Watson (1767–1837), RSA artist, with his son William Smellie Watson (1796–1874), also an artist
- The Rev Prof George Paxton (1762–1837)
- Mrs Anne Grant (1755–1838), poet and author
- The Rev John Jamieson DD FRSE (1759–1838), antiquarian
- Alexander Nasmyth (1758–1840), artist, architect, and inventor. His most notable painting is the much-copied portrait of Robert Burns. His son, James Nasmyth was also a prolific inventor, most famous for the steam hammer. His other son, Patrick Nasmyth continued the family line as an artist of note.
- John Shaw Stewart FRSE (1793–1840) essayist
- John Abercrombie (physician) (1780–1844)
- The Rev David Dickson (1780–1842)
- Sir Richard Honyman (1787–1842)
- The Rev Robert Murray McCheyne (1813–1843)
- James Stevenson RSA, artist (1780–1844)
- George Meikle Kemp (1795–1844), master joiner, self-taught architect and designer of the Scott Monument.
- The Rev David Welsh (1793–1845)
- Admiral James Haldane Tait (1771–1845)
- Andrew Combe (1797–1847), phrenologist
- John Stark FRSE (1779–1849), natural history author and printer and his son James Stark FRSE (1811–1890)
- The Rev Cpt James Haldane (1768–1851)
- The Rev Prof John Lee (1779–1859)
- Susan Ferrier (1782–1854) author
- Patrick Robertson, Lord Robertson (1798–1855)
- William Home Lizars (1788–1859), engraver, and his brother John Lizars (1792–1860) and father Daniel Lizars Sr.
- Thomas De Quincey (1785–1859), author of Confessions of an English Opium-Eater. An addict himself, he was an acknowledged influence on many later authors, but he himself has now slipped from fame. Of those crediting De Quincey with influencing them probably the most notable is Edgar Allan Poe.
- Henry Grey (1778–1859)
- Thomas Stewart Traill (1781–1862)
- William Tait (publisher) (1793–1864)
- James Pillans (1778–1864), educator
- James Frederick Ferrier (1808–1864), first epistemologist.
- George Aikman (1788–1865), engraver
- William Borthwick Johnstone RSA (1804–1865), first Keeper of the National Gallery of Scotland
- Very Rev Prof James Robertson (1806–1860) Moderator of the General Assembly of the Church of Scotland
- John Marshall, Lord Curriehill (1794–1868), law lord
- Elizabeth C. Clephane (1830–1869), hymnwriter
- William Penney, Lord Kinloch (1801–1872), law lord
- James Craufurd, Lord Ardmillan (1804–1876), law lord
- Peter David Handyside FRSE (1808–1881), anatomist
- David Rhind (1808–1883), architect
- Duncan McLaren (1800–1886) MP and Lord Provost (with his son Walter McLaren MP (1853–1912))
- Priscilla Bright McLaren (1815–1906) suffragist & abolitionist
- Robert Reid Raeburn (1819–1888) architect
- William Fettes Pitcairn (1804–1891), theological author
- John Kippen Watson FRSE (1818–1891) in charge of Edinburgh's gas lighting

==== 20th century ====
- Jane Clapperton (d.1914) suffragette and novelist
- Robert Traill Omond FRSE (1858–1914), physicist and geologist
- Sir Donald Crawford (1837–1919)
- Walter Biggar Blaikie (1847–1928), engineer, historian and astronomer
- Mabel Dawson RSW (1887–1965), artist
- James Frederick Strachan, Lord Strachan (1894–1978)
- Sarah Mair (d.1941), suffragette

Uncertain

- The heart of Canadian sculptor Robert Tait McKenzie

== See also ==
- Church of Scotland
- Cuthbert
- Hippolyte Blanc
- List of Church of Scotland parishes

== Bibliography ==
- Drummond, Andrew Landale (1934). The Church Architecture of Protestantism. T. & T. Clark
- Dunlop, A. Ian (1988). The Kirks of Edinburgh: 1560–1984. Scottish Record Society. ISBN 0-902054-10-4
- Gifford, John; McWilliam, Colin; Walker, David (1984). The Buildings of Scotland: Edinburgh. Penguin Books. ISBN 0-14-071068-X
- Hay, George (1957). The Architecture of Scottish Post-Reformation Churches: 1560 to 1843. Oxford University Press.
- Lorimer, George (1915). The Early History of St Cuthbert's Church, Edinburgh. William Blackwood and Sons
- Gray, William Forbes (1940). Historic Edinburgh Churches. The Moray Press.
- Royal Commission on the Ancient and Historical Monuments of Scotland (1951). An Inventory of the Ancient and Historical Monuments of the City of Edinburgh with the Thirteenth Report of the Commission. His Majesty's Stationery Office.
- Scott, Hew (1915). Fasti ecclesiae scoticanae; the succession of ministers in the Church of Scotland from the reformation. Vol. 1. Edinburgh: Oliver and Boyd.
- Sime, William (1829). History of the Church and Parish of St. Cuthbert, Or West Kirk of Edinburgh. Edinburgh: A. Jack & Company [printed].
- Stephenson, Marigold H.; Hunter, Ailsa B. J.; Thow, Jean (1994). The Kirk below the Castle. St Cuthbert's Parish Church
