= Robert Paul =

Robert Paul may refer to:

- Robert Paul (figure skater) (1937–2024), Canadian figure skater
- Robert Paul (banker) (1788–1866), director of the Commercial Bank of Scotland
- Robert H. Paul (1830–1901), American Old West sheriff
- Robert Paul (painter) (1906–1979), Zimbabwean painter
- Robert W. Paul (1869–1943), cinema pioneer
- Robbie Paul (born 1976), New Zealand international rugby footballer who played in the 1990s and 2000s
- Bob Paul (rugby league), New Zealand international rugby league footballer who played the 1970s
- Robert Paul (athlete) (1910–1998), French Olympic sprinter
- Robert Paul (footballer) (born 1984), German football defender
- Robert Bateman Paul (1798–1877), Anglican priest
