= David Dickson =

David Dickson may refer to:

- David Dickson (minister) (1583?–1663), Scottish theologian
- David Dickson the Elder (1754–1820), Church of Scotland minister
- David Dickson (surgeon) (1780–1850), Scottish naval surgeon
- David Dickson the Younger (1780–1842), Scottish minister
- David C. Dickson (Mississippi politician) (1794–1836), American politician in the state of Mississippi
- David Catchings Dickson (1818–1880), American politician in the state of Texas
- David Dickson (swimmer) (born 1941), Australian swimmer
- David Dickson (footballer) (born 1952), Australian rules footballer at Carlton
- Dave Dickson (born 1959), American rugby union player
- David Dickson (rugby union), New Zealand international rugby union player

== See also ==
- David Dickinson (born 1941), English antiques expert and television presenter
- David Dickson Rogers (1845–1915), Canadian politician
- David Dixon (disambiguation)
