= James Balfour Paul =

Lord Lyon King of Arms (1846–1931)

Sir James Balfour Paul KCVO CStJ FSAS
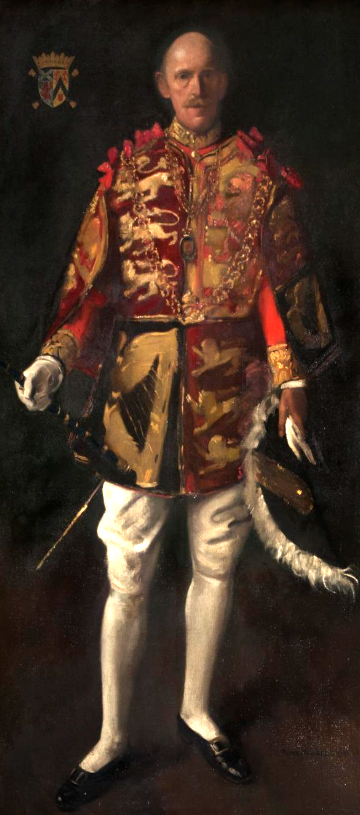
- Portrait of Sir James Balfour Paul painted in 1901 by Sir James Guthrie (1859–1930), housed in the Scottish National Portrait Gallery. Sir James is depicted in the rich ceremonial attire of the Lord Lyon King of Arms. Ceremonial dress Description: Tabard (quarterly): Embroidered with the Royal Arms of the United Kingdom as used in Scotland; 1. First (top left, from viewer's perspective): England, the arms of England (three gold lions passant guardant on red).; 2. Second (top right): Scotland, a red lion rampant within a double tressure flory-counter-flory on gold.; 3. Third (bottom left): Ireland, a gold harp on blue.; 4. Fourth (bottom right): England, Gules, three lions passant guardant in pale Or (i.e., the Royal Arms of England).; Baton: Sir James Balfour Paul holds the baton of office in his right hand, which is gloved in white. (Note: The origin of the coat of arms lies in the tabard or surcoat worn by medieval knights over their armour for identification. The ceremonial tabard of office worn by Sir James Balfour Paul in this 1901 full-length portrait represents the pre-1928 design used by officers of the Lyon Court, reflecting the unified heraldic styling of the United Kingdom in use at the time. Until the early 20th century, tabards worn by Scottish officers of arms—including the Lord Lyon King of Arms—bore the English form of the Royal Arms, with the lion of Scotland in the second quarter. This format corresponded with the tabards used by English officers of arms. Following the First World War, efforts to adopt a form more representative of Scotland's heraldic tradition led to the introduction of new tabards featuring the Scottish version of the Royal Arms, in which the lion rampant occupies the first quarter. The change was initiated through the advocacy of Sir David McCowan, a Glasgow citizen and heraldic enthusiast. The revised tabards were first worn publicly at the opening of the General Assembly of the Church of Scotland in May 1928, and have since become the standard ceremonial dress for officers of the Lyon Court.)

Lord Lyon King of Arms
- In office 1890–1927
- Preceded by: George Burnett
- Succeeded by: George Swinton

Personal details
- Born: 16 November 1846 Edinburgh
- Died: 15 September 1931 (aged 84) Edinburgh
- Resting place: Dean Cemetery

Sir James Balfour Paul (16 November 1846 – 15 September 1931) was the Lord Lyon King of Arms, the officer responsible for heraldry in Scotland, from 1890 until the end of 1926.

== Life ==
James Balfour Paul was educated at Royal High School and University of Edinburgh.

He was admitted an advocate in 1870. Thereafter, he was Registrar of Friendly Societies (1879–1890), Treasurer of the Faculty of Advocates (1883–1902), and appointed Lord Lyon King of Arms in 1890. He was created a Knight Bachelor in the 1900 New Year Honours list, and received the knighthood on 9 February 1900. Among his works was The Scots Peerage, a nine-volume series published from 1904 to 1914.

=== Heraldic cases ===
As Lord Lyon, Sir James presided over two particularly notable heraldic cases in Court of the Lord Lyon.

In the first case, Petition MacRae, 22 April 1909, Sir Colin MacRae of Inverinate petitioned the Court of the Lord Lyon, seeking recognition of his right to bear the historic coat of arms as Chief of the Name of Clan MacRae. This claim was contested by Colonel John MacRae-Gilstrap, a senior member of the MacRae family of Conchra, who had previously placed a caveat with the court to be notified of any such applications. Colonel MacRae-Gilstrap argued that all MacRae families were on an equal footing and that the clan traditionally had no chief other than the Earl of Seaforth. In his ruling, Lord Lyon Balfour Paul confined his decision to heraldic matters, determining that Sir Colin had not sufficiently proven his right to the chiefly arms. Consequently, the question of the clan's chiefship remained unresolved, with debates continuing thereafter.

The second case, Stewart-Mackenzie v. Fraser-Mackenzie, initiated in 1917, concerned Mrs. Beatrice Anna Fraser-Mackenzie of Allangrange, who had received a grant of arms following her inheritance of the Allangrange estate. The arms included quarterings of Fraser and Falconer with the undifferenced arms of Mackenzie, along with supporters traditionally associated with the chiefship of Clan Mackenzie.

Colonel James Stewart-Mackenzie (1847–1923), later Baron Seaforth, contested the grant, claiming that only the clan chief had the right to bear those arms and supporters. Balfour Paul ruled in 1918 that the use of quartered arms sufficiently differentiated Mrs. Fraser-Mackenzie's bearings and that there was no exclusive right to the supporters. The decision was upheld by the Court of Session and ultimately by the House of Lords in 1921, establishing an important precedent in Scottish heraldic law regarding the differentiation of arms and the non-exclusive use of supporters.

=== Honours ===
Shortly before his retirement in 1926, he was appointed a Knight Commander of the Royal Victorian Order (KCVO) in the 1926 New Year Honours list. He was also admitted an Esquire and then a Commander of the Order of St John of Jerusalem, elected a Fellow of the Society of Antiquaries of Scotland, and was a member of the Royal Societies and University (Edinburgh) Clubs. He was also Secretary of the Order of the Thistle. He gave the Rhind Lectures in 1898, on heraldry.

== Birth, marriage, direct family, and relatives ==
James Balfour Paul was born in Edinburgh, the second son of the Reverend John Paul of St Cuthbert's Church, Edinburgh, and Margaret Balfour (1807–1860) (granddaughter of James Balfour; 1705–1795; of Pilrig), at their home, 13 George Square, Edinburgh.

James Balfour Paul resided at 30 Heriot Row, Edinburgh. He married, in 1872, Helen Margaret Forman (1851–1929), daughter of John Nairne Forman (1806–1884) of Staffa (WS) and Jane Mitchell (maiden; 1810–1882). They had four children:

1. Their oldest, Lieutenant Colonel John William Balfour Paul DSO (1873–1957) was a Scottish soldier and officer of arms in the Court of the Lord Lyon.
  1. Glencairn Balfour Paul (1917–2008), Sir James's grandson, was a British Arabist and diplomat.
2. Their second oldest, Arthur Forman Balfour Paul (1875–1938), became an architect and partner of Robert Rowand Anderson.
3. Their third oldest, Cuthbert Balfour Paul (1876–1926), became a surgeon.
4. Their youngest, Millicent Jane Balfour Paul (1880–1972), married Alfred Stevenson Balfour, who became a Captain in Royal Indian Marines, and served as aide-de-camp to Governor of Madras. See 1919 New Year Honours (OBE) § Civil Division.
- James Balfour Paul was a nephew of Robert Paul (1788–1866), a church elder, banker, and director of the Commercial Bank of Scotland.
- Rev. William Paul (1754–1802) was his paternal grandfather. Sir William Moncreiff (1706–1767), 7th Baronet, was his great-grandfather.
- He was a second cousin of Sir Frederick Spencer Arnold-Baker (1885–1963), a British lawyer – they had the same great-grandfather, Rev. James Nairne (1750–1819).
- He was a first cousin once removed of Lieutenant-General Sir Charles Edward Nairne kcb (1836–1899) of the British military who served in British India. Paul's great-Grandfather, Rev. James Nairne, was a grandfather of Nairne.

Sir James is buried with other family in Dean Cemetery in Edinburgh, in the north section immediately east of the opening in the wall between the original cemetery and the north extension.

== Published works ==
- The History of the Royal Company of Archers, the Queen's Body-Guard for Scotland. 1875. Retrieved March 4, 2025. OCLC 8039728, 931821817.

→ See Royal Company of Archers

1. Via Internet Archive (Oxford). W. Blackwood. 1882.
2. Via Google Books (Oxford). 1882.
- As editor: Registrum Magni Sigilli Regum Scotorum (Latin) translation → [The Register of the Great Seal of Scotland]. 1882–1883. OCLC 38665920 (all editions).
1. "ᴀ.ᴅ. 1424–1513". 1882 – via Internet Archive (UCLA).
2. "ᴀ.ᴅ. 1513–1546". 1883 – via Internet Archive (UCLA).
- Handbook to the Parliament House. Edinburgh: William Green, publisher. 1884. OCLC 315621609, 1079302250.
- Heraldry in Relation to Scottish History and Art, Being the Rhind Lectures on Archaeology for 1898. Edinburgh: David Douglas, publisher. 1890 – via HathiTrust. LCCN 01-25112; OCLC 5455166 (all editions).
- Ordinary of Arms Contained in the Public Register of All Arms and Bearings in Scotland (1st ed.). Edinburgh: William Green & Sons. 1893 [1903; 2nd ed.]

→ See Public Register of All Arms and Bearings in Scotland

1. Via Internet Archive (UC Libraries) (1st ed.). W. Green & sons. 1893.
2. Via Internet Archive (Duke University). 1903.
Note: "Ordinary" (as in "ordinary of arms") is a systematic catalog of coats of arms, organized by their primary design elements rather than by the name of the armiger (the person or entity bearing the arms) → See wikipedia article, "Ordinary of arms".
- Memoir and Remains of John M. Gray in 2 vols. (1895)
- "The Matrimonial Adventures of James V". Transactions of the Glasgow Archaeological Society (Read at a meeting of the Society November 16, 1905). New Series. 5 (2). Glasgow: Published for the Society by James MacLehose & Sons, St. Vincent Street, Publishers to the University. Printed at the University Press by Robert Maclehose and Co. Ltd.: 90–104 1906. Retrieved April 8, 2025. ISSN 2398-5755; OCLC 9973508470.
1. Via Internet Archive (Michigan). 1906.
2. James Balfour Paul (1906). "The Matrimonial Adventures of James V.". Transactions of the Glasgow Archaeological Society. New. 5 (2). Edinburgh University Press: 90–104. JSTOR 24681410
- As editor: The Scots Peerage Founded on Wood's Edition of Sir Robert Douglas's Peerage of Scotland Containing an Historical and Genealogical Account of the Nobility of That Kingdom. With Armorial Illustrations. Edinburgh: David Douglas, publisher. 1904–1914 – via HathiTrust. LCCN 05-33339; OCLC 1430137 (all editions).

→ See John Philip Wood

1. Vol. 1. 1904 – via Google Books (Stanford).
2. Vol. 1. 1904 – via Internet Archive (Robarts).
3. Vol. 1. 1904 – via Internet Archive (Allen County Public Library).
4. Vol. 2. 1905 – via Google Books (Michigan).
5. Vol. 3. 1906 – via Internet Archive (Allen County Public Library).
6. Vol. 4. 1907 – via Internet Archive (Allen County Public Library).
7. Vol. 5. 1908 – via Google Books (Michigan).
8. Vol. 6. 1909 – via Internet Archive (Allen County Public Library).
9. Vol. 7. 1910 – via Internet Archive (Allen County Public Library).
10. Vol. 8. 1911 – via Internet Archive (Allen County Public Library).
11. Vol. 9. 1914 – via Google Books (Michigan).
- As editor: Accounts of the Lord High Treasurer of Scotland (11 Vols. → Paul edited Vols. 2–11). 1900–1916.
1. Vol. 1 edited by Thomas Dickson.
2. Vol. 1: AD 1473–1498. 1877 – via Google Books (Cal Berkeley).
  James Balfour Paul, editor, henceforth.
3. Vol. 2: AD 1500–1504. 1900 – via Google Books (Cal Berkeley).
4. Vol. 3: AD 1506–1507. 1901 – via Google Books (Oxford).
5. Vol. 3: AD 1506–1507. 1901 – via Google Books (Stanford).
6. Vol. 4: AD 1507–1513. 1902 – via Google Books (Oxford).
7. Vol. 5: AD 1515–1531. 1903 – via Google Books (Harvard).
8. Vol. 6: AD 1531–1538. 1905 – via Google Books (Minnesota).
9. Vol. 7: AD 1538–1541. 1907 – via Google Books (Stanford).
10. Vol. 8: AD 1541–1546. 1908 – via Google Books (Harvard).
11. Vol. 9: AD 1546–1551. 1911 – via Google Books (Michigan).
12. Vol. 10: AD 1551–1559. 1913 – via Google Books (Michigan).
13. Vol. 11: AD 1559–1566. 1916 – via Google Books (Princeton).
- Paul, James (30 November 1916). "Ancient Artillery: With Some Notes on Mons Meg". Proceedings of the Society of Antiquaries of Scotland. 50: 191–201. doi:10.9750/PSAS.050.191.201. OCLC 9783847762.

→ See Mons Meg.

- As editor: Diary of George Ridpath Minister of Stitchei, 1755–1761. Edinburgh: Scottish History Society. 1922. OCLC 898923826.

→ See George Ridpath.

== Armorial stratigraphy of James Balfour Paul and his achievements ==
Heraldic Armory and Elements	
① Personal Heraldry
	James Balfour Paul Coat of Arms: Escutcheon: 1. Field tincture: Or (gold).; 2. Charges: A chevron indented (zigzag-edged) Sable (black) between two lions rampant in chief, langued and armed Gules, and an escutcheon in base Gules.
② Governance Heraldry: Escutcheon of Lord Lyon King of Arms
	Arms of Lord Lyon King of Arms: Blazon: Argent, a lion in base, sejant affronté Gules, forepaws extended outward below the shoulders, langued and armed Vert, holding in his dexter (lion's left side of the shield → or right from the viewer's perspective) paw a thistle (national Flower of Scotland) slipped Vert, flowered Proper, and in his sinister paw a shield Gules (the smaller shield) of the second (second tincture mentioned earlier in this part of the blazon, Gules), a St. Andrew's Cross (aka the Saltire Azure) in chief (official coat of Lord Lyon King of Arms).; Escutcheon: 1. Shape: Heater.; 2. Division of the field: 1. Parted per fess; 2. Field tincture (in base): Argent (silver or white).; 3. Charges: 1. Saltire (St. Andrew's Cross) Azure in chief.; 2. Lion sejant affronté Gules holding a thistle Proper and shield Gules in base.
③ Governance Heraldry: Escutcheon and Achievements of the Lord Lyon King of Arms
	Achievement of Arms for the Lord Lyon King of Arms (simplified); See Heraldic authority § United Kingdom (the crown, here, is – as of 2003 – different; see note, below): Blazon: Argent a lion sejant guardant Gules armed and langued Azure holding in his dexter paw a thistle Proper and in his sinister a shield of the second; on a chief Azure a St. Andrew's cross of the first.; Escutcheon: (same as Lord Lyon King of Arms in Section ②, above); 1. Heraldic elements (not devices, purely structural) and insignia; 1. Royal Crown of Scotland: A Scottish crown befitting of the authority of the Lord Lyon King of Arms under the Scottish monarchy.; 1. Ermine base: The foundation of the coronet, featuring a white ermine lining with black ermine spots, symbolizing nobility and rank.; 2. Circlet (base of the coronet): A golden (Or) circlet, adorned with an ermine-lined cap and featuring alternating fleur-de-lis and crosses pattée Or, separated by small orbs Or.; 3. Red Cap (Gules): A velvet cap enclosed within the coronet, visible between the golden ornamental elements.; 4. Ornamental upper rim: A golden (Or) arched structure with intricate curling embellishments, providing an elegant flourish to the coronet's design.; 5. Central pointer: A distinct gold ornamental projection on the central vertical band, possibly serving as a decorative feature or symbolic element.; 2. Crest: Atop the crown, sits a lion sejant affronté guardant Or (seated, facing forward, and looking outward), wearing a crown Or, and holding: 1. In its dexter paw (heraldic right, viewer's left), a sword Or (symbolizing justice and royal authority).; 2. In its sinister paw (heraldic left, viewer's right), a scepter Or (a traditional emblem of sovereignty).; 3. The lion itself is guardant (facing forward), a characteristic commonly associated with Scottish regal imagery. It wears an open arched crown adorned with fleur-de-lis and crosses pattée, resting atop the red cap of maintenance.; 3. Insignia of office (honors and symbols of Lyon's authority, distinct from structural elements).; 1. Batons of office: Two ceremonial batons, positioned in saltire (crossed diagonally) behind the escutcheon, with their ends emerging from behind the chief (top) and base (bottom) of the shield. Each baton is Azure, Semé (scattered) with heraldic symbols, all Or, and tipped Or (gold on the ends).; Dexter baton (extending from dexter chief to sinister base): Semé of, from top to bottom: a thistle, a fleur-de-lis, and a Tudor rose (the heraldic emblem of England, symbolizing the union of the Houses of York and Lancaster).; Sinister baton (extending from sinister chief to dexter base): Semé of, from top to bottom: a thistle, a Saltire, and a thistle.; 2. Collar of the Order of the Thistle: An ornate golden chain interwoven with thistles and featuring the badge of the Order of the Thistle at the bottom.; 3. Badge of the Order of the Thistle: Featuring St. Andrew holding his saltire, suspended from the collar.; Saint Andrew: The patron saint of Scotland, depicted with his traditional diagonal cross.; The Saltire (St. Andrew's Cross): A defining symbol of Scotland, which also appears on the national flag.; The Crown of Scotland: Signifying the Lord Lyon's official authority.; Gold Oval Frame: Represents a heraldic badge, commonly associated with high-ranking officials.; Note: In this artistic representation of the Achievement of Arms for the Lord Lyon King of Arms, the inscription Miserere mei Deus is absent from the circlet of the crown. In 2003, a new crown, designed by Nicola Williams, was created for the Lord Lyon King of Arms. It is based on the historic Crown of Scotland, last seen in the 17th century. The crown features removable arches—similar to those on one of the late Queen Mother's crowns—which are taken off during coronations to avoid any perceived hint of lèse-majesté.
	Achievement Arms of the Lord Lyon King of Arms: Two additions to the "Achievement of Arms for the Lord Lyon King of Arms (simplified)" (above): 1. Compartment: A grassy mount Vert, serving as the base for the supporters.; 2. Supporters: Two lions rampant guardant Proper Gules, armed and langued Azure, each wearing the proper crown of the Lord Lyon King of Arms, their bodies semée of thistles crowned Or.
④ Heraldic Symbols and Insignia of Office
	Scottish Guardian Thistle: See Legend of the guardian thistle.
Crown of a British King of Arms New (as of 2003); Crown of Lord Lyon King of Arms	Crown of Lord Lyon King of Arms: Description: Coronet (or Crown) of the Lord Lyon King of Arms is made of silver-gilt and features a circlet inscribed with the Latin phrase "Miserere mei Deus" (meaning "Have mercy on me, O God") from Psalm 51:1. The rim is adorned with sixteen golden oak leaves, with every second leaf rising higher than the one beside it—nine of which are visible in profile view. The cap is made of crimson velvet, topped with a gold finial, and is lined with ermine fur at the base. The oak-leaf design reflects Scottish heraldic tradition, while the inscription emphasizes divine mercy. Historically, this crown was modeled after the Crown of Scotland, but without jewels. The same crown is used for Kings of Arms throughout the United Kingdom: Highest Ranking; 1. Garter: Principal King of Arms of England and the highest-ranking herald (professional officer of arms) in the United Kingdom – Chief Herald of the College of Arms.; 2. Lord Lyon: Sovereign-appointed Chief Herald of Scotland, unique in that he, she, or they hold judicial authority over heraldic matters – Chief Herald of Scotland but completely independent from the College of Arms.; Mid Level; 1. Clarenceux: Second in rank after Garter. Responsible for heraldic jurisdiction south of the River Trent, College of Arms Member.; 2. Norroy and Ulster: Third in rank. Responsible for heraldic jurisdiction north of the River Trent and Northern Ireland – before 1921, simply Ireland, College of Arms Member.; Lower Ranking (Orders of Chivalry): These three heralds only serve their respective orders of chivalry and do not have broader heraldic jurisdiction, and, therefore, are not members of the College of Arms. These Kings of Arms hold ceremonial roles within their respective orders.; 1. Bath; 2. Order of St Michael and St George; 3. Order of the British Empire; Finial: At the very top of the Crown of the King of Arms sits a golden thistle finial. Since the Union of the Crowns in 1603, when James VI of Scotland became James I of England, the thistle has been recognized as an important British (not just Scottish) symbol. This finial consists of a stylized thistle head with radiating leaves, resembling a traditional heraldic thistle. It is mounted on a rounded gold orb, which serves as the transition point between the crown's cap and its highest ornament.
	Insignia of Knights and Ladies of The Most Ancient and Most Noble Order of the Thistle: Collar: Gold and enamel chain with alternating links of thistles and rue.; Badge: Suspended from the collar, an enamelled representation of St. Andrew carrying the cross of his martyrdom.; Motto (not used in the later Full Achievement of Arms): Star of the Order of the Thistle, bearing the motto on a circlet, Nemo me impune lacessit (Latin), the National motto of Scotland, which translates to "No one harms me unpunished".; Note: The Most Ancient and Most Noble Order of the Thistle is also known as The Order of Saint Andrew. It is an order of Knighthood and Ladyhood (female equivalent of a Knight) that is restricted to the King or Queen and sixteen others. It was established by James VII of Scotland in 1687.
	Star of the Order of the Thistle: Note: Part of the Collar, above, but not an element used in Official Arms of the Lord Lyon King of Arms.
	Alternate version adopted by Canada.: Cap badge, "Black Friday", of the Black Watch (Royal Highland Regiment) of Canada.
⑤ Personal Arms (dexter) Impaled with Office Arms (sinister)
	Achievement (escutcheon only) of James Balfour Paul as Lord Lyon King of Arms: Impaled escutcheon: Parted per pale, on the dexter: Argent, a lion in base, sejant affronté Gules, forepaws extended outward below the shoulders, langued and armed Vert, holding in his dexter (lion's left side of the shield → or right from the viewer's perspective) paw a thistle (national Flower of Scotland) slipped Vert, flowered Proper (naturally colored, purple with green stem), and in his sinister paw a shield Gules (the smaller shield) of the second (second tincture mentioned earlier in this part of the blazon, Gules), a St. Andrew's Cross (aka the Saltire Azure) in chief (official coat of Lord Lyon King of Arms); on the sinister: Or, a chevron indented Sable between two lions in chief, rampant, langued and armed, and an escutcheon in base Gules (red).; 1. Shield shape: Heater.; 1. Division of the field, parted per pale: Dexter half (arms of the office): 1. Field tincture (in base): Argent (silver or white).; 2. Charge (in base): A lion sejant affronté Gules, forepaws extended outward below the shoulders, langued and armed Vert, holding in the dexter paw a thistle (national Flower of Scotland) slipped Vert, and in the sinister paw a shield Gules (in Fox-Davies 1904 depiction, the lion's forepaws are raised above the shoulders, with a more elaborate tail).; 3. Charge (in chief): St. Andrew's Cross (aka the Saltire) Argent on a field Azure.; Sinister half (personal arms): 1. Field tincture: Or (gold).; 2. Charges: A chevron indented Sable (black) between two lions rampant in chief, langued and armed Gules, and an escutcheon in base Gules.
⑥ Personal Arms Impaled with Office in Full Achievement
	Achievement of Arms of Sir James Balfour Paul, Lord Lyon King of Arms (hatched, with full external office and personal elements): Armorial bearings: Parted per pale on the Dexter side the official coat of Lyon King of Arms, namely, argent, a lion sejant full-faced gules, holding in the Dexter paw a thistle slipped vert, and in the sinister a shield of the second, on a chief azure, a Saint Andrew's Cross of the field, on the sinister his paternal coat, namely or, a chevron indented sable between two lions rampant in chief, and an escutcheon in base gules. Above the shield is placed the coronet of Lyon King of Arms, thereon a helmet befitting his degree, with a mantling sable, doubled or; and upon a wreath of his liveries is set for Crest, a lion sejant guardant gules, his dexter paw resting upon an escutcheon as in the arms; and in an escroll over the same this Motto, Pro Rege et Republica [For King and Republic]. Behind the shield are placed in saltire two batons representing that belonging to his office, and round the shield is placed a gold collar of SS (Collar of Esses), and a triple chain also of gold, and depending from it the proper badge of Lyon King of Arms.; Impaled escutcheon: The shield follows the same blazon as described above. This version is rendered in hatching, using heraldic engraving conventions to indicate tinctures.; External Elements of the Achievement; 1. Above the Escutcheon (descending, from the top); 1. Motto: Pro rege et republica ("For King and Commonwealth").; 2. Crest: A lion sejant guardant Gules, its dexter paw resting upon an escutcheon as in the arms.; 3. Torse: 4. Helm: Angled toward dexter, closed unbarred visor with gorget.; 5. Crown (King of Arms Crown): See Crown of the Lord Lyon, above.; 2. Encircling the Escutcheon; 1. Collar: A gold collar of SS (Collar of Esses), with a triple chain and the badge of the Lord Lyon King of Arms.; 2. Triple chain: A triple-linked chain extends from the base of the shield, suspending the "Badge of Office."; 3. Badge of Office (a.k.a. Lyon Badge): The crowned shield with the Lion Rampant of Scotland, hanging from the triple-linked chain.; 3. Emerging from behind the Escutcheon; 1. Batons: Two ceremonial batons in saltire, each Azure semé of symbols Or, signifying the office of Lord Lyon King of Arms.; Note: This depiction follows the heraldic hatching system introduced by Silvester Petra Sancta (1590–1647).
	Collars of Esses (1882): Albert Hartshorne (1839–1910), artist/author.
	Achievement of Arms of Sir James Balfour Paul, Lord Lyon King of Arms (in color, with full external office and personal elements): Blazon: Parted per pale, on the dexter side the official coat of the Lyon King of Arms, namely: Argent, a lion sejant full-faced gules, holding in his dexter paw a thistle slipped and leaved Vert, and in his sinister a shield of the second; on a chief Azure, a saltire Argent. On the sinister, his paternal arms: Or, a Chevron indented Sable between two lions rampant in chief and an Escutcheon in base Gules. Mantling Sable, doubled Or; and upon a wreath of his liveries is set for crest, a lion sejant guardant Gules, his dexter paw resting upon an Escutcheon as in the arms; and in an escroll above, the Motto: Pro Rege et Republica.; Impaled escutcheon: Same blazon as described in the previous entries.; 1. Crest: A lion sejant guardant Gules, its dexter paw resting upon an Escutcheon as in the arms.; 2. Helm: A barred, open-faced steel helm affronté.; 3. Crown (King of Arms Crown); 4. Mantling: Gules lined Argent.; 5. Compartment: Two batons in saltire behind the shield (office of Lord Lyon).; 6. Collar: A gold collar of SS with a triple chain supporting the badge of the Lord Lyon King of Arms.; 7. Motto: Pro rege et republica ("For King and Commonwealth").; 8. Additional inscription: Miserere Mei Deus (Psalm 51:1) sometimes appears on the circlet.; 9. Medallions (badges): 1. Rose medallion: At the bottom center of the Collar of Esses, forming the main linking element—a crowned heraldic rose Or with a three-part curved banner beneath, bearing Dieu et Mon Droit.; 2. Queen Victoria Diamond (1897) Jubilee Medallion Suspended from a crimson ribbon running behind the Thistle, Rose, and Shamrock badge (which itself is affixed to the base of the Collar of Esses), there is an oval medallion bearing the left-facing, crowned and veiled profile of Queen Victoria. Although the surrounding inscription is illegible, it closely resembles that of the 1897 Diamond Jubilee medal, which typically reads "Victoria Regina et Imperatrix". The inclusion of this medallion may reflect personal preference or a commemorative gesture rather than a formal heraldic award, as Jubilee medals—though sometimes granted with a semi-official status—were not universally regarded as decorations in the strict chivalric sense.; 3. Lyon Badge: At the lowest point, the crowned shield with the Lion Rampant of Scotland, representing the Lord Lyon's official authority.; Note: This full-color version (see Fox-Davies, Art of Heraldry, 1904) shows gold, red, black, blue, and silver tinctures in detail.
	Thistle, Rose, and Shamrock Badge (Collar of SS; 1882): The Thistle, Rose, and Shamrock: Floral emblems of Scotland, England, and Ireland (before 1921). A medallion Or, ensigned with a Royal Crown, having a scroll below inscribed Dieu et mon droit.; Elements: 1. Crown (Sovereign, St Edward's): A jewelled circlet with alternating crosses pattée and fleurs-de-lis, from which rise arches of pearls, meeting beneath an orb and cross finial.; 2. Floral order: Thistle, Rose, and Shamrock represent parts of the realm.; 3. Motto: A gold scroll-like banner bearing Dieu et mon droit.

=== Tinctures and hatchings ===
Heraldic tinctures and hatchings for the achievement of arms of James Balfour Paul
Class:	Metals		Colors				
Tincture:	Argent	Or	Gules	Purpure	Sable	Azure	Vert
Hatching:							
Non-heraldic equivalent:	Silver/ White	Gold/ Yellow	Red	Purple	Black	Blue	Green

=== Tenure and succession ===
Heraldic offices
Preceded by George Burnett (1822–1890); 1866–1890	Lord Lyon King of Arms; 1890–1927	Succeeded by George Sitwell Campbell Swinton (1859–1937); 1927–1929

== Gallery ==
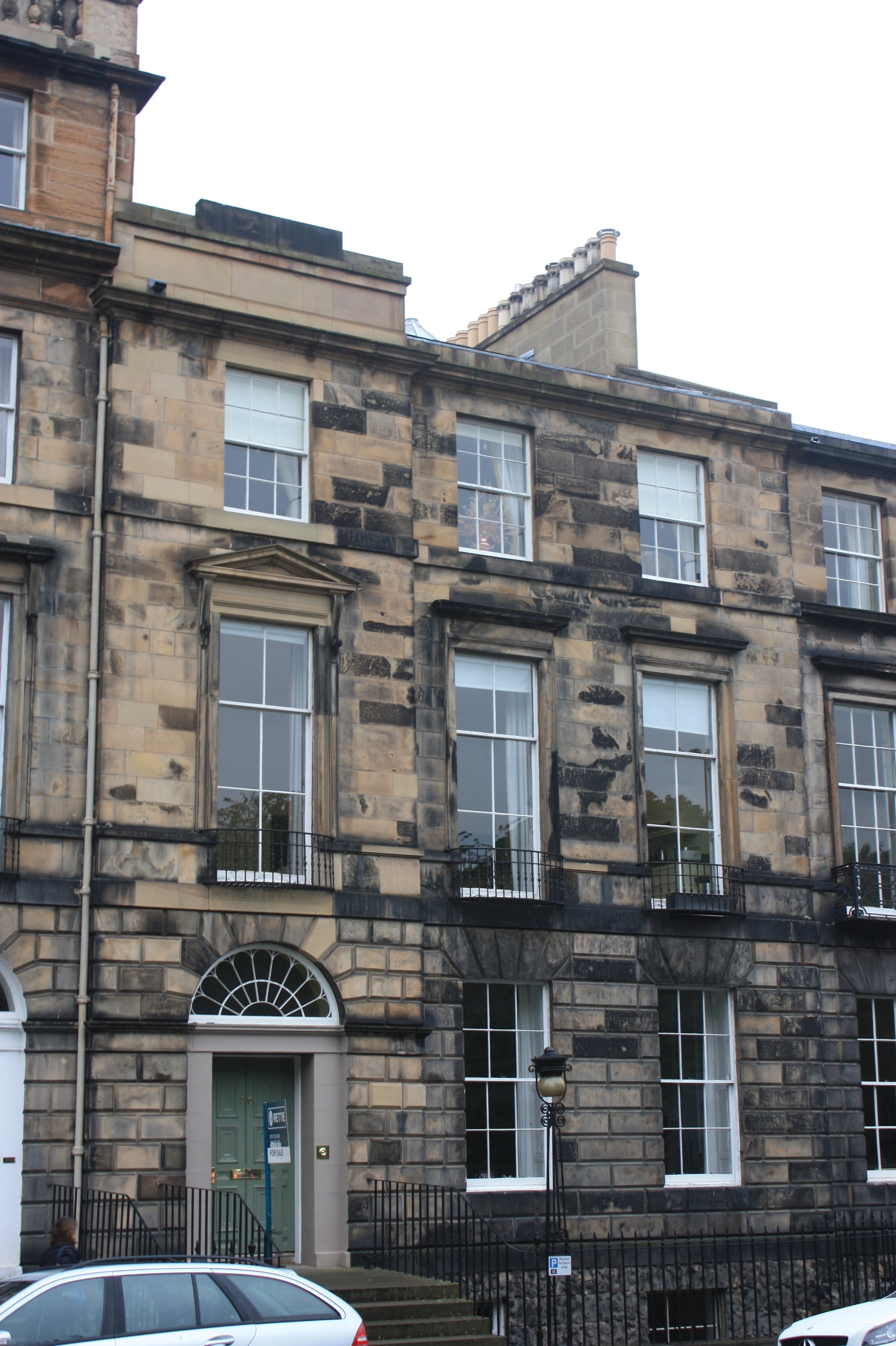
30 Heriot Row, Edinburgh, residence of Sir James Balfour Paul.

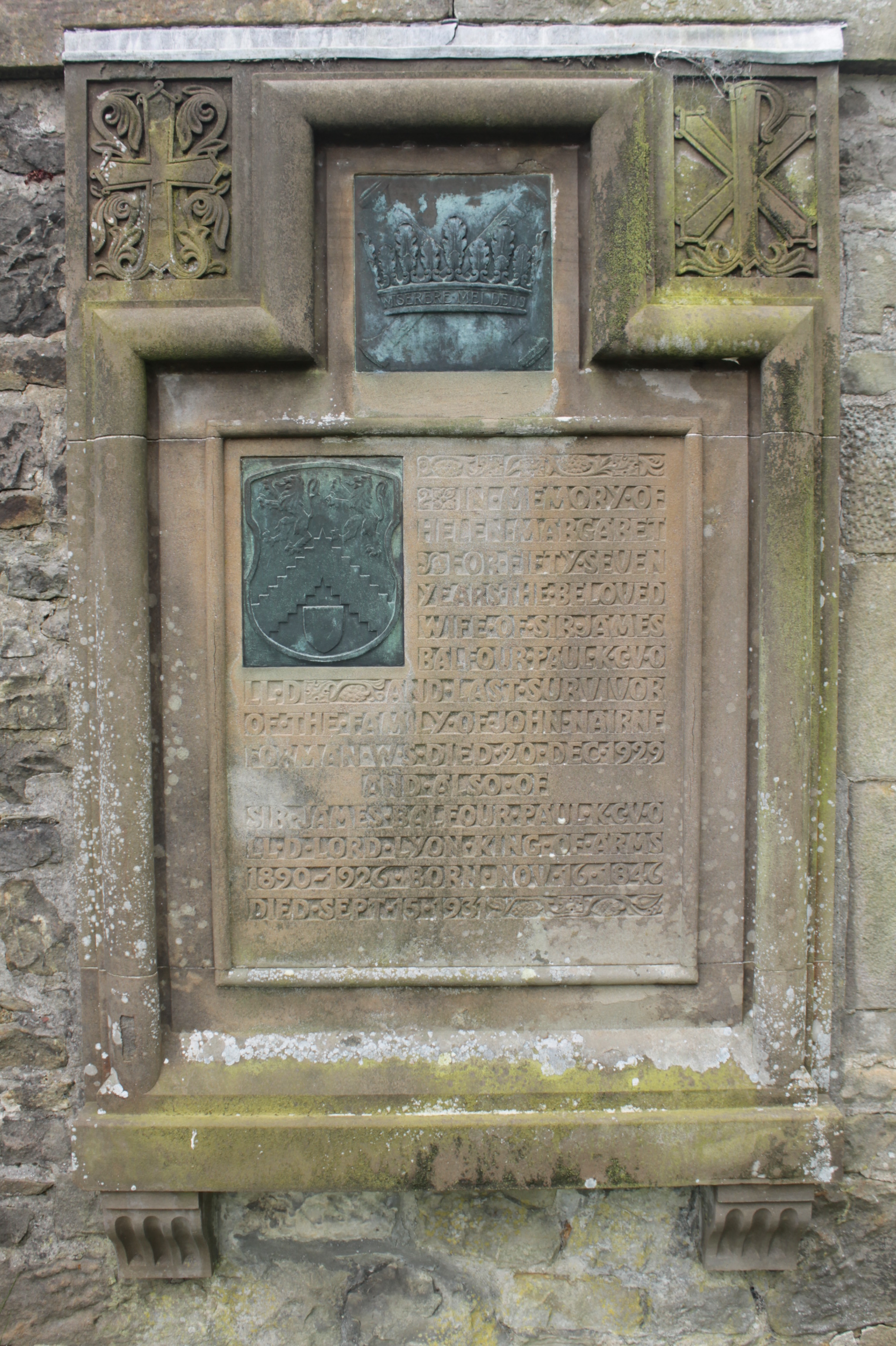
The grave of Sir James Balfour Paul, Dean Cemetery, Edinburgh.
In memory of Helen Margaret – For fifty-seven years the beloved wife of Sir James Balfour Paul KCVO LL.D. – And last survivor of the family of John Nairne Forman W.S. died 20th Dec 1929 – And also of Sir James Balfour Paul KCVO LL.D. Lord Lyon King of Arms 1890–1926 born Nov. 16 1846 died Sept. 15 1931.

== Bibliography ==
=== References ===
- The Archaeological Journal. London: The Royal Archaeological Institute of Great Britain and Ireland. ISSN 0066-5983.
1. Hartshorne, Albert (1839–1910) (December 1882). "Notes On Collars of SS". Vol. 39, no. 156. pp. 376–183. doi:10.1080/00665983.1882.10852044; OCLC 83330776, 6899319556.
  1. Via Internet Archive (Getty). 1844.
  2. Via Internet Archive (Boston). 1882.
- Athenæum (The). Journal of English and Foreign Literature, Science, the Fine Arts, Music and the Drama. London: Printed by John Edward Francis, Athenæum Press. 1828–1921. OCLC 1403770997 (all editions), 317934190, 1090932253, 930266785.
1. "Scottish History: Accounts of the Lord High Treasurer of Scotland. Edited by Sir James Balfour Paul, F.S.A., Lord Lyon King of Arms. – Vol. III. ᴀ.ᴅ. 1506–1507. (Edinburgh, H.M. General Register House.)" (review). Issue No. 3854. 7 September 1901. pp. 314–315 – via Internet Archive (Robarts).
2. "Accounts of the Lord High Treasurer of Scotland. – Vol. IV. 1507–1513. Edited by Sir James Balfour Paul, Lord Lyon King-at-Arms. (Edinburgh, H.M. General Register House.)" (review). Issue No. 3938. 18 April 1903. pp. 492–493 – via Google Books (Stanford).
See General Register House
- Fox-Davies, Arthur Charles (1899). Armorial Families: A Directory of Some Gentlemen of Coat-Armour, Showing which Arms in Use at the Moment are Borne by Legal Authority. Edinburgh: T.C. & E.C. Jack.
1. 3rd ed. Via HathiTrust (Cal Berkeley). T.C. & E.C. Jack. 1899. p. 46.
2. 3rd ed. Via Internet Archive (Cal Berkeley). 1899. p. 46.
- Fox-Davies, Arthur Charles (1904). The Art of Heraldry: An Encyclopædia of Armory. Edinburgh: T.C. & E.C. Jack. Retrieved March 7, 2025. LCCN 04-12432, LCCN 58-53048; OCLC 3588106 (all editions).

See The Art of Heraldry: An Encyclopædia of Armory

1. "The Armorial of Sir James Balfour Paul, Lyon King of Arms". Plate 4 (between pages 16 & 17). Retrieved March 29, 2025.
  1. Via HathiTrust (Getty). T.C. & E.C. Jack. 1904.
  2. Via Internet Archive (Boston). 1904.
  3. Via Internet Archive (Getty). 1904.
  4. Via Google Books (Princeton).
- "General Post Office Directory Directory, for Edinburgh and Its Environs". The Post Office Annual Directory. Under the Patronage of Sir Edward S[mith] Lees (1783–1846), Secretary to the General Post-Office for Scotland. Containing an Alphabetical List of the Nobility, Entry, Merchants, and Others, in Edinburgh, Leith, and Newhaven, With an Appendix, and a Street Directory. (27th ed.). National Library of Scotland.
1. Via Internet Archive (National Library of Scotland). 1832–1833. p. 149.
- Johnston, George Harvey (1860–1921) (1912) [1904: 1st ed]. Scottish Heraldry Made Easy (2nd ed.). Edinburgh: W. & A.K. Johnston (William Johnston, 1802–1888; and brother, Alexander Keith Johnston, 1804–1871). New York: Scribner. Retrieved March 8, 2025. OCLC 794027778 (all editions).
1. Via Wikimedia Commons (Polona). 1912.
2. Via Internet Archive (UCLA). 1912.
- Kelly's Handbook to the Titled, Landed, and Official Classes. London: Published by Kelly's Directories, Limited. LCCN 08-5253; OCLC 848314175 (all editions).
1. Via Internet Archive (Robarts Library) (29th ed.). 1903. p. 1156.
- Nicolas, Sir Nicholas Harris (1799–1848) (1842). History of the Orders of Knighthood of the British Empire; Of the Order of the Guelphs of Hanover; And of the Medals, Clasps, and Crosses, Conferred for Naval and Military Services. London: Published for John Hunter.
1. Vol. 3. 1842. p. 65 (1 p. before p. 65 – via Internet Archive (Allen County Public Library).
- Paul, James Balfour (1846–1931) (1900). Heraldry in Relation to Scottish History and Art, Being the Rhind Lectures on Archaeology for 1898. Edinburgh: David Douglas, publisher – via HathiTrust. Retrieved February 5, 2018. LCCN 01-25112; OCLC 5455166 (all editions).
1. Via Royal Collection Trust.
2. See Royal Collection
3. Via Internet Archive (Cal Berkeley). 1900.
- Paul, Sir James Balfour (1893–1903). An Ordinary of Arms Contained in the Public Register of All Arms and Bearings in Scotland. Edinburgh: William Green and Sons.
1. "Chevron: J. Balfour Paul" (1st ed.). 1893 – via Internet Archive (Boston Public Library).
2. "Chevron: James Balfour Paul" (2nd ed.). 1903 – via Internet Archive (Duke University).
Note: "Ordinary" (as in "ordinary of arms") is a systematic catalog of coats of arms, organized by their primary design elements rather than by the name of the armiger (the person or entity bearing the arms) → See wikipedia article, "Ordinary of arms".
- Paul, James Balfour (1912). Some Pauls of Glasgow and Their Descendants. The Scanty Record of an Obscure Family (copy 35 of 35). Edinburgh: Thomas and Archibald Constable, Printers to His Majesty (King George V) at the Edinburgh University Press (printed for private circulation). This article incorporates text from this source, which is in the public domain. OCLC 1157878350 (all editions).
1. Via Internet Archive (National Library of Scotland). 1912.
- Scotsman (The) (13 July 2003). "Lord Lyon Gets His Crown Back" – "The Crown Worn by the Lord Lyon at Coronation Ceremonies Has Been Recreated". Edinburgh. Archived from the original on 21 March 2025 – via Wayback Machine. ISSN 0307-5850.
- Stevenson, John Horne (1855–1939); Seten, George (1822–1908) (1914). Heraldry in Scotland: Including a Recension of 'The Law and Practice of Heraldry in Scotland' by the Late George Seton. By Stevenson, J. H. (John Horne), 1855–1939; Seton, George, 1822–1908. Law and Practice of Heraldry in Scotland.
1. Vol. 1 (PIMS). Glasgow, J. Maclehose. 1914.
2. Vol. 2 (PIMS). Glasgow, J. Maclehose. 1914.
  1. Appendix IV. "Patents of Lyon Kings-of-Arms" → (3) "Patent in favour of James Balfour Paul, Esquire (now Sir James Balfour Paul, C.V.O., LL.D.), dated 12th March 1890.". Glasgow, J. Maclehose. 1914. pp. 451–454.
- Times (The) (1 January 1900). "New Year's Honours". No. 36027. London. p. 9. ISSN 0140-0460.
- Times (The) (16 September 1931). "Sir James Balfour Paul, Scottish Herald and Antiquary" (obituary). No. 45929. p. 17 (col. B) – via Wikisource. ISSN 0140-0460.

=== General references ===
- Douglas, Robert, Sir (1904–1914), Paul, James Balfour, Sir (ed.), The Scots Peerage (nine volumes ed.), Wood's – Volume IX contains the index for the other eight volumes.
