= James Veitch (minister) =

Scottish minister of the Church of Scotland (1808–1879)

James Veitch (1808–1879) was a minister of the Church of Scotland and noted astronomer and geologist. A traditionalist, he resisted all innovations within the church (such as reintroduction of iconography in stained glass, and the use of church organs). Ironically, in bequeathing most of his monies to the church, much was then used to "modernise" the church structure.

== Life ==
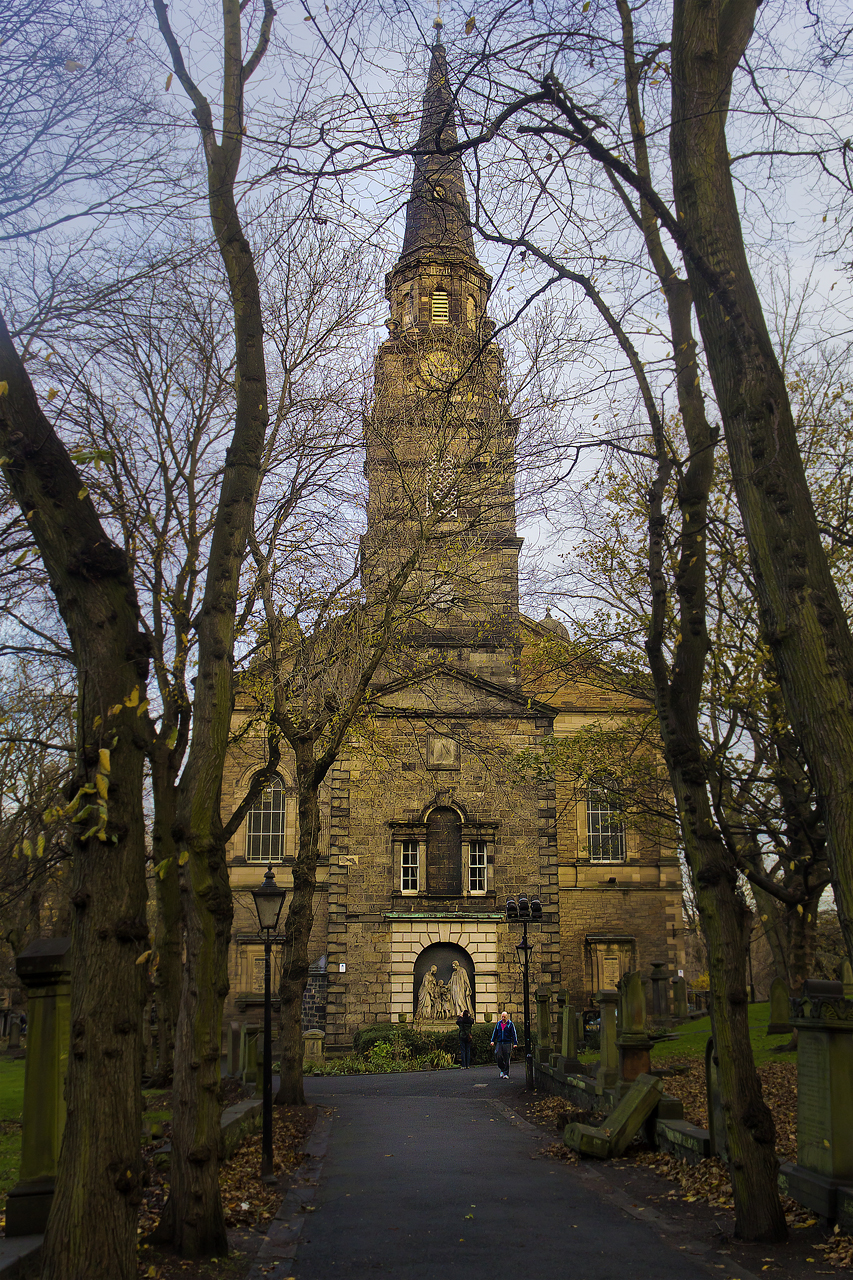
St Cuthberts Church from the west

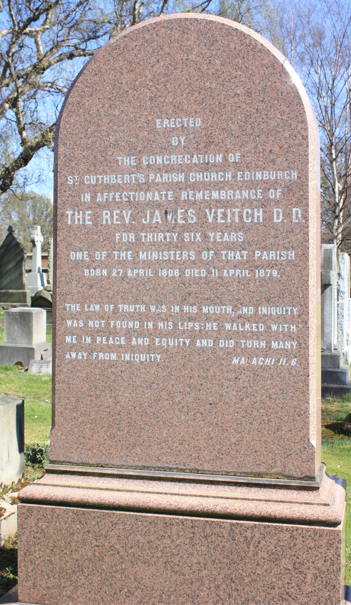
The grave of Rev James Veitch, Grange Cemetery

He was born at Inchbonny near Jedburgh on 27 April 1808 one of at least seven children of Betty Robson and her husband, James Miller Veitch, a ploughwright. He was educated at the University of Edinburgh. His father made telescopes and this evolved into Veitch and his brothers being keen astronomers.

He was ordained as minister of Galashiels in August 1830. He translated to the collegiate section of St Cuthbert's Church, Edinburgh in March 1843 in place of Rev David Dickson in the mids of the ministry (at "first charge") of Rev John Paul.

The University of Edinburgh awarded him an honorary Doctor of Divinity (DD) in 1854. He was convener of the Indian Mission for many years.

He lived his final years at 8 Merchiston Park in west Edinburgh.

He fell ill in 1877 and died on 11 April 1879 aged 70. He was buried in Jedburgh Abbey with his family. He is also memorialised in Grange Cemetery in Edinburgh. In his will he left all his monies to the church and parish. This in part paid for the major rebuild of the church in 1890.

His position in St Cuthbert's was filled by James Barclay.

== Publications ==
- Reasons Against Affiliating our Christian Missions to the Secular System of Government Education in India (1857)
- The Effifacy of Prayer (1865)
