= David Dixon =

David or Dave Dixon may refer to:

- David Dixon (actor) (born 1947), British actor who played the role of Ford Prefect on The Hitchhiker's Guide to the Galaxy
- David Dixon (businessman) (1923–2010), American businessman and sports executive who helped create the New Orleans Saints NFL team and the United States Football League
- David Dixon (American football) (born 1969), New Zealand native who was an NFL offensive lineman with the Minnesota Vikings
- David Dixon (golfer) (born 1977), winner of the 2008 St Omer Open and former low amateur at the British Open
- David Dixon (footballer) (1898–after 1930), English professional footballer
- David Dippie Dixon (1842–1929), amateur historian in Northumberland
- Dave Dixon (DJ) (1926–1964), American DJ

== See also ==
- David Dickson (disambiguation)
- David Dixon Award
