= David Dickson the Younger =

Scottish Presbyterian minister and writer

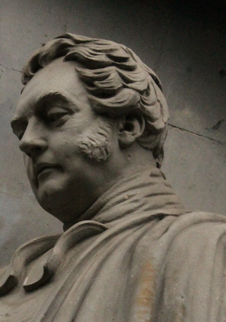
The head of Rev David Dickson by Alexander Handyside Ritchie

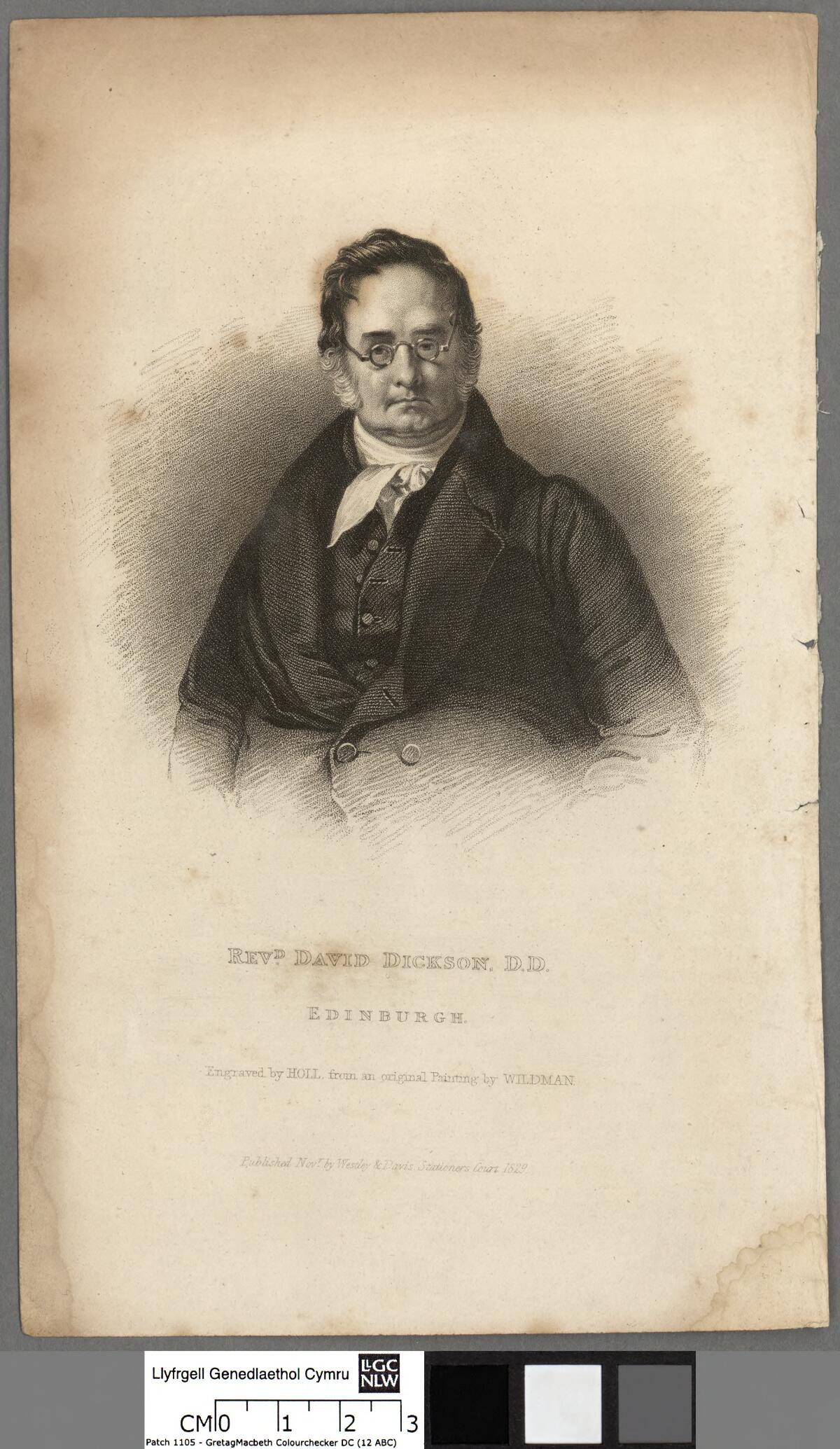
Portrait of Revd. David Dickson D.D

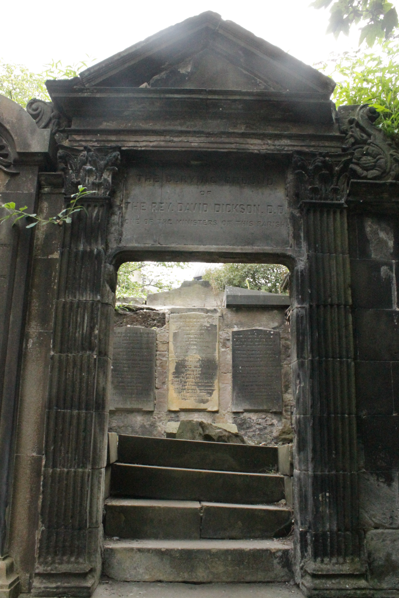
The grave of Rev David Dickson, St Cuthbert's Churchyard

David Dickson (1780 – 28 July 1842) was a Scottish Presbyterian minister and writer.

== Life ==
He was born in 1780 at Libberton, Lanarkshire, the parish where his father Rev David Dickson (1753-1820) was minister. He was educated at the parish school of Bothkennar. In 1792 the family moved to Edinburgh and after several assistant minister positions his father got a post as minister of the New North Church (contained within St Giles Cathedral in Edinburgh and the family relocated, allowing Dickson greater ease to study at the University of Edinburgh. In December 1801 he was licensed to preach in the Church of Scotland by the Presbytery of Edinburgh, and appointed early in 1802 to the Chapel of Ease at Kilmarnock. In December 1802 King George III presented him to the town council of Edinburgh and consequently, in May 1803, he was chosen collegiate minister of St Cuthbert's Church, Edinburgh in place of Rev William Paul.

Until the death of Henry Moncrieff-Wellwood in 1827, Dickson was made working under him. In 1828 Moncreiff was replaced by John Paul and Dickson remained under the latter until his own death. However, this "secondary" position did not diminish the public appreciation of his role.

In 1824 the University of Edinburgh conferred on him an honorary Doctor of Divinity (DD). He had some reputation as a Hebrew scholar and his sermons were plain. He avoided mixing in the doctrinal disputes which culminated in the Disruption of 1843 of the Scottish church. On the occasion of Sir Walter Scott's funeral he was chosen to hold the service in the house at Abbotsford. He was secretary of the Scottish Missionary Society for many years.

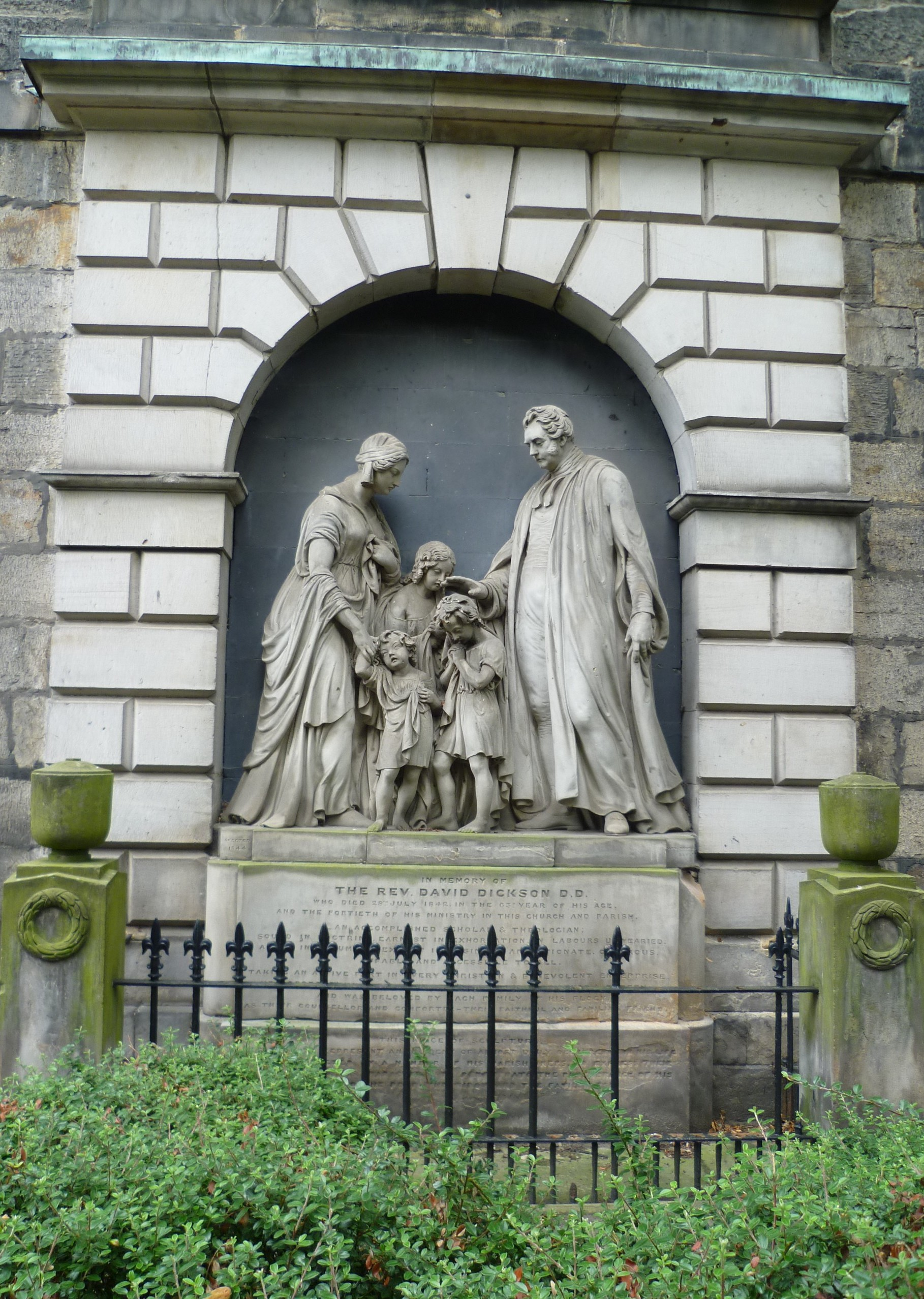
David Dickson Memorial, St. Cuthbert's Church

Dickson died at West Kirk manse on 28 July 1842, and was buried in St Cuthbert's Church, where a monument was erected to his memory. The statue of Dickson is by Alexander Handyside Ritchie. He is buried in a vault on the raised ground to the south-west.

His position at St Cuthbert's was filled by Rev James Veitch.

== Works ==
Dickson wrote articles in the Edinburgh Encyclopædia and in the Edinburgh Christian Instructor and other magazines. He published:

- The Influence of Learning on Religion, 1814.
- A small volume of sermons, 1818.
- Discourses, Doctrinal and Practical, a collection of his homilies, 1857.
- Five separate sermons (1806–31).

He edited:

- Memoir of Miss Woodbury, 1826;
- Rev. Walter Foggo Ireland's sermons, 1829; and
- lectures and sermons by the Rev. George Bell Brand, 1841.

== Family ==
In August 1808 Dickson married Janet Jobson (1783-1878), daughter of James Jobson of Dundee, and together they had nine children, six of whom survived to adulthood:

- David Dickson (b. 1810)
- James Jobson Dickson (1811-1891) an accountant in Edinburgh
- John Wardrobe Dickson (1813-1818)
- Elizabeth Crawford Dickson (b. 1815) married Dr John George Pack of Bathgate
- Charles Dickson (1817-1857) an advocate
- Christian (1819-1820) died in infancy
- Jane Dickson (1820-1912)
- Christian Helen Dickson (1822-1902)
- Margaret Ann (1825-1826) died in infancy
