= James Barclay (minister) =

Scottish minister and footballer (1844–1920)

James Barclay (1844–1920) was a Scottish footballer and minister of the Church of Scotland who emigrated to Canada.

Barclay played for both Dumfries and Canonbie football clubs. He was captain of both the Glasgow University Cricket Club and Glasgow University Football Club and was Captain of the Gentlemen of Scotland Cricketers. He was on the shortlist of 17 players for the first Scotland v. England football match in 1872, but was not selected.

== Life ==
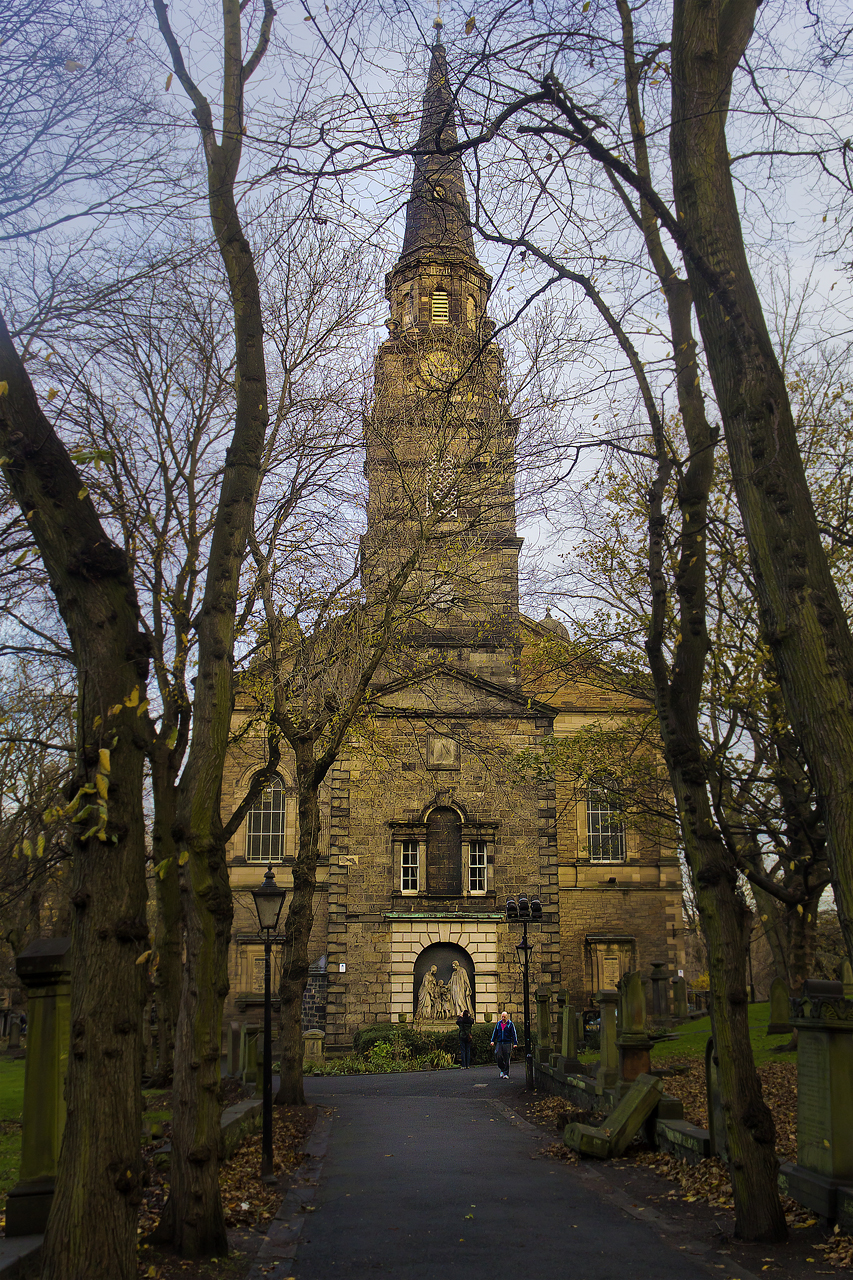
St Cuthbert's Church from the west

He was born in Paisley on 19 June 1844 the son of James Barclay and his wife, Margaret Cochrane Brown. He was educated at Paisley Grammar School then at Merchiston Castle School in Edinburgh. He then studied Divinity at Glasgow University graduating MA in 1865. He was licensed to preach by the Presbytery of Paisley in 1870 and ordained at St Michael's in Dumfries in January 1871 on the recommendation of Rev Dr John Lee. He was translated to Canonbie in July 1874.

In 1876 he left Dumfriesshire and translated to Linlithgow, west of Edinburgh. In May 1878 he moved to St Cuthbert's Church, Edinburgh to replace Rev James Veitch who was fatally ill. He was under charge of James MacGregor who was in "first charge".

He resigned suddenly in May 1883, and, despite the high prospects normally associated with ministry at St Cuthbert's, he accepted an offer at St Paul's Church in Montreal in Canada. In 1892, he received at honorary doctorate (DD) from Glasgow University and in 1902 an honorary doctorate (LLD) from McGill University where he resigned in 1909. At St Paul's, he received a salary of $7.3 million, the highest salary ever paid to a minister in Canada. He is thought to have returned to Edinburgh and lived with one of his children.

== Death ==
He died on 18 March 1920 and was buried in Dean Cemetery in west Edinburgh. His position at St Cuthbert's was filled by Andrew Wallace Williamson.

== Family ==
In 1873, he married Marion Simpson daughter of Alexander Simpson, a solicitor in Dumfries. Their children included:

- James John Barclay MD (1874-1913)
- Alexander Barclay (b.1875) an engineer
- Hugh Brown Barclay died in childhood
- Charles Norman Barclay (1877-1932)
- Malcolm Drummond Barclay (1880-1942) civil engineer
- Marion Rutherford Barclay (b.1881) married Robert Dale
- MacGregor ("Gregor") Barclay (1885-1964)
