= Base (heraldry) =

Base, terrace in base, or champagne

The base, more formally the terrace in base or champagne, is a heraldic charge that occupies the lower third of the field. It is in that sense the inverse correlate of the chief. In French heraldry, the champagne is considered an "honourable ordinary" (pièce honorable), but in English heraldry, it is frequently omitted from lists of the honourable ordinaries, and grouped, if at all, with the subordinaries. The diminutive of the base, occupying one half the height of the ordinary, is termed plaine in French heraldry. Another, now less common, English language term for the base is the foot, a usage the recalls the German Schildfuß, Danish skjoldfod, and Dutch schildvoet.

In English heraldry, the terms base, terrace in base, and champagne are synonyms that include both charges with a straight-line upper edge running parallel to the chief and those with an upper edge curved or otherwise varied. Standard variations are the mount and trimount. In French heraldry in contrast, the terms champagne and its diminutive plaine are reserved for those with straight upper edges and the term terrasse (terrace in base) for those with curved or otherwise varied upper edges. Champagnes that take step-wise lines of division or variation are blasoned in French as champagne pignonnée. The latter (terrasse) are furthermore classed as mobile charges rather than honourable ordinaries.

== Gallery ==
=== Coat of arms ===
Le Sars

Hermonville

Helsinki

Quebec City

Borgholm

Eda Municipality

Ampuero

Bosbüll

de: Ascheberg (Westfalen)

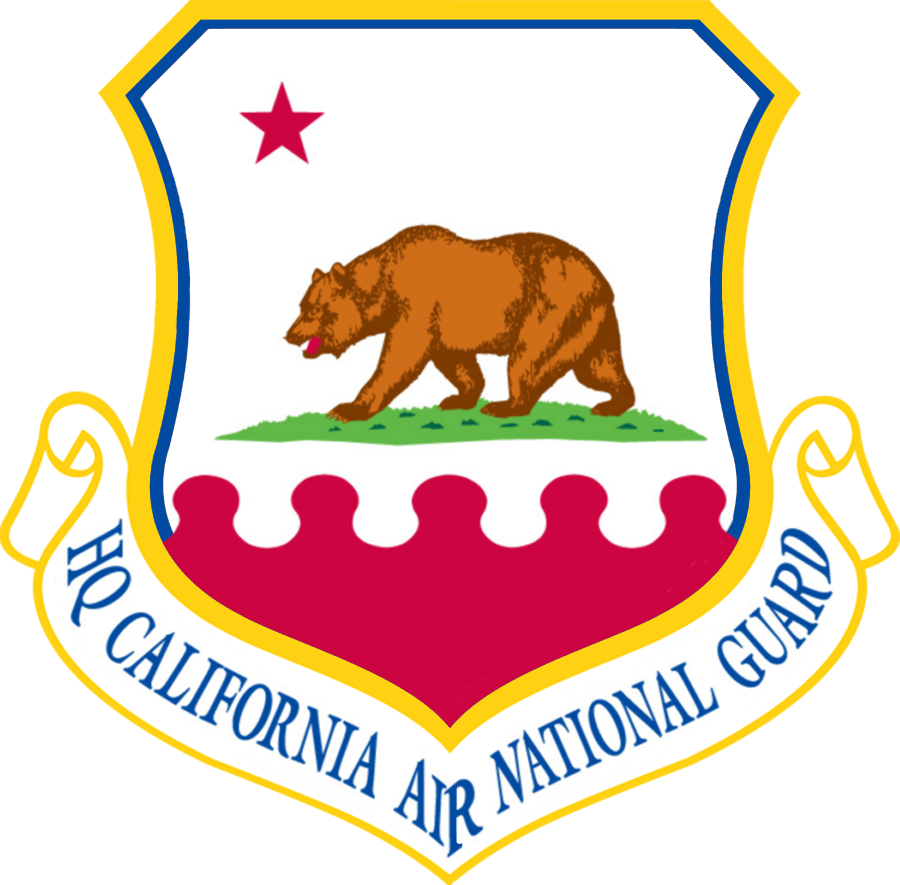
California Air National Guard

Joutsa

==== Mount ====
Montanaire

Etingen

Pylkönmäki

Egerkingen

County of Nice

de:Bergisch Neukirchen

Coat of arms of Slovakia

==== Champagne pignonée ====
Jaulgonne

Ormesson

Pouzol

Retzwiller

==== Plaine ====
Bouaye

La Brée-les-Bains

Méounes-lès-Montrieux (terrasse isolée)

=== On flags ===
Flag of Belarus

Flag of the former Republic of Anguilla (1967–1969)

Flag of the former Ukrainian Soviet Socialist Republic (1950–1992)

Flag of Gibraltar, United Kingdom

Flag of the Opole Voivodeship, Poland (civil)

Flag of the Republic of Chuvashia, Russia

Flag of Saratov Oblast, Russia

Flag of California, US

Flag of Regina, Saskatchewan, Canada

Flag of the City of Alexandria, Egypt

Flag of Bosbüll, Schleswig-Holstein, Germany

Flag of the Canadian Broadcasting Corporation

Ensign of the Netherlands Coast Guard

== See also ==
- Chief (heraldry)
- Side (heraldry)
- Gallery of flags by design
