= William Paul (minister) =

Scottish minister of the Church of Scotland

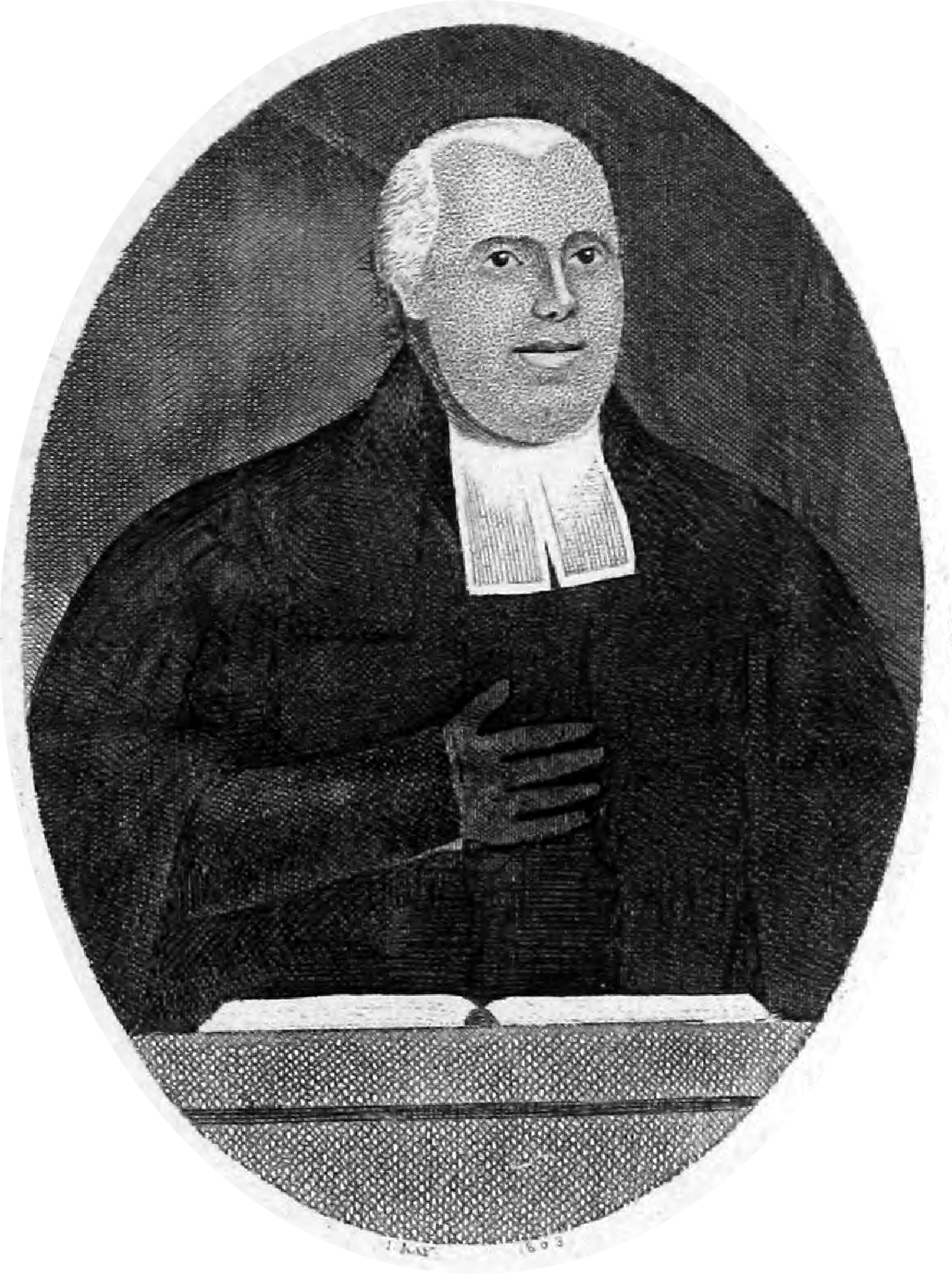
- William Paul by John Kay

Personal details
- Born: 10 June 1754
- Died: 27 October 1802 (aged 48)
- Spouse: Susan Moncreiff (m. 1783)

William Paul (10 June 1754 – 27 October 1802) was a minister of the Church of Scotland who was patriarch to a number of eminent Scottish ministers. He was Chaplain in Ordinary to King George III.

== Life ==
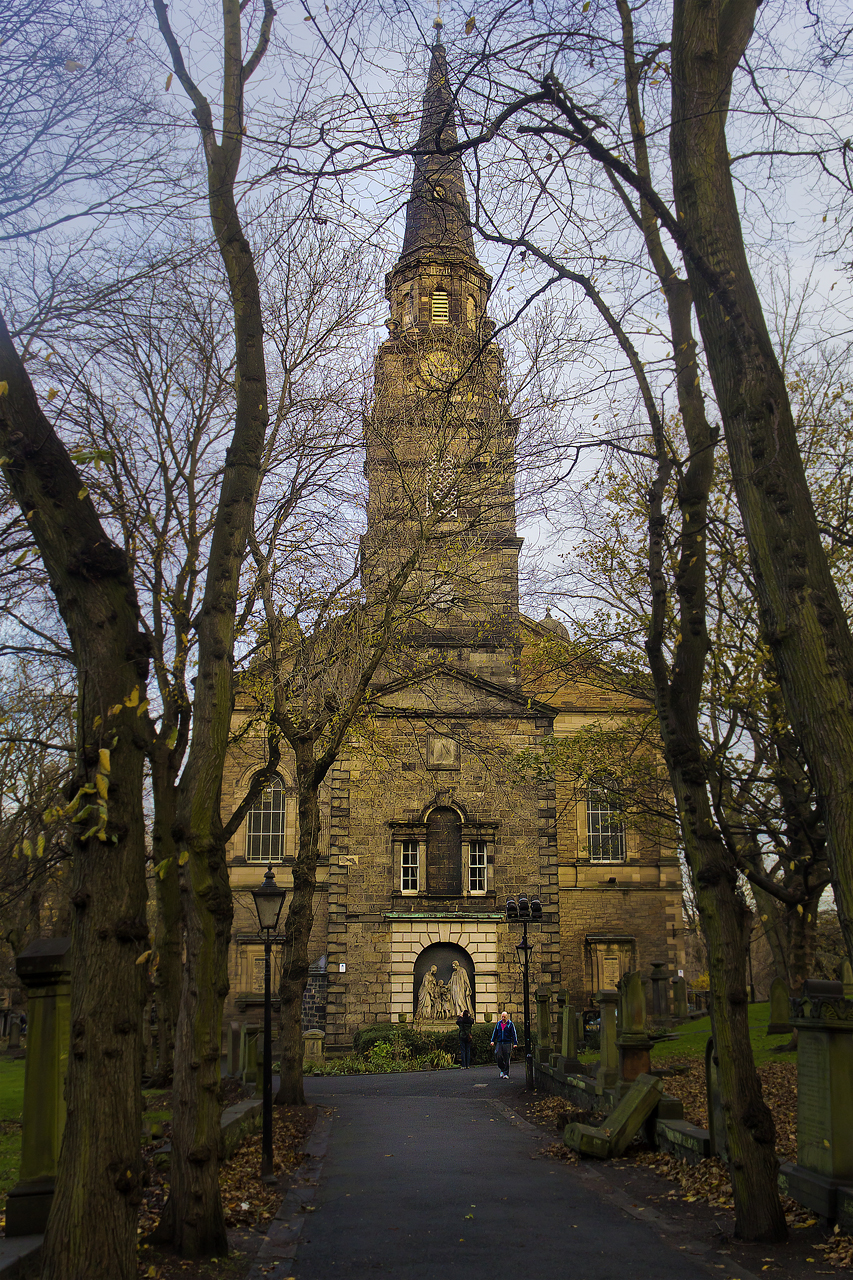
St Cuthbert's Church from the west

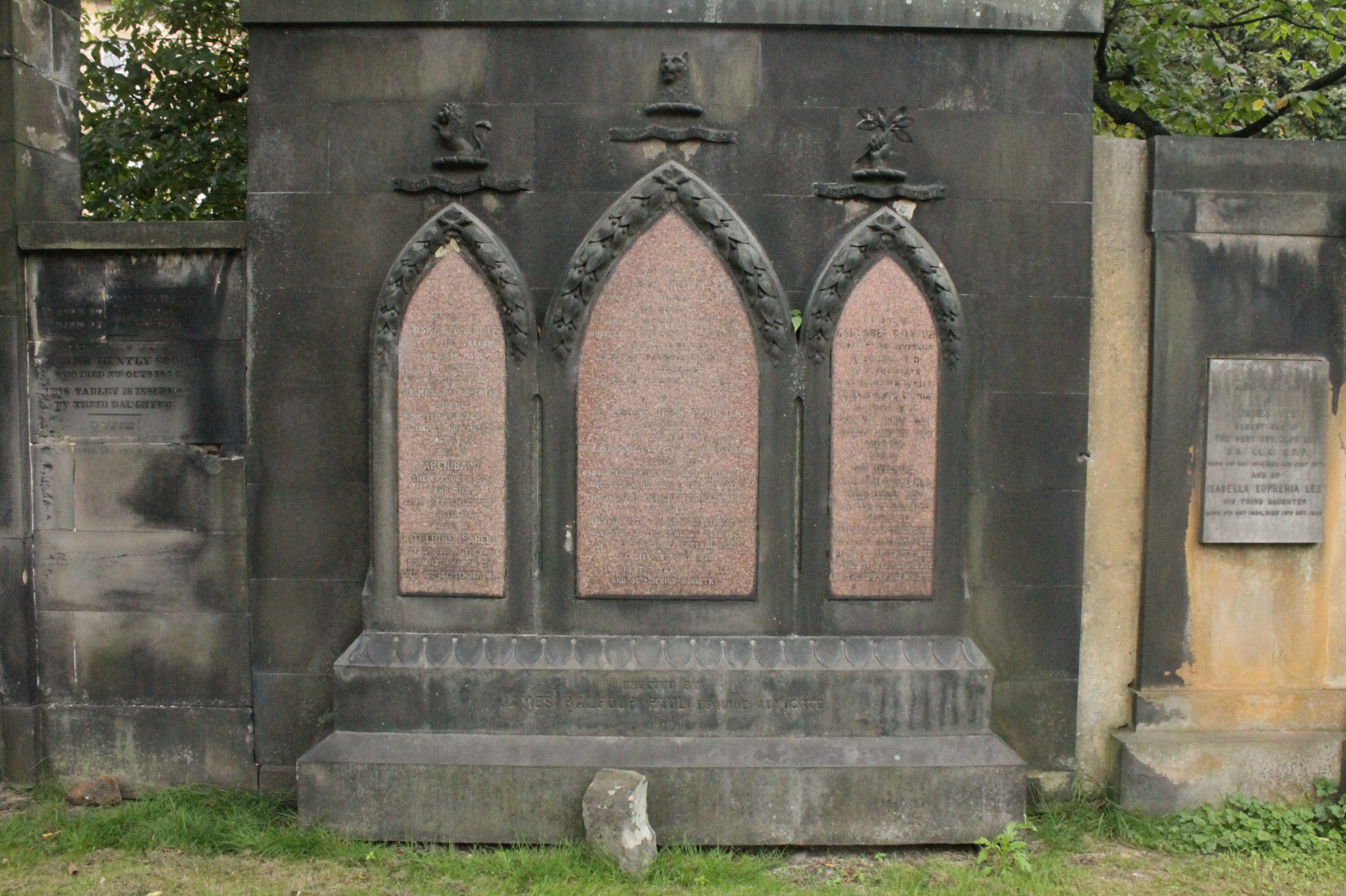
The grave of Rev John Paul, St Cuthbert's Churchyard, Edinburgh

He was born in Glasgow on 10 June 1754 the son of Robert Paul and his wife Agnes Anderson. He studied at Glasgow University first getting a degree in literature and philosophy then and gaining a masters degree (MA) in 1773 which looked at more theological issues. He then gained a position as private tutor to the family of David Leslie, 6th Earl of Leven, who lived in Gayfield House just east of Edinburgh's New Town and also had estates in Fife. During this period he also studied at Divinity Hall in Edinburgh. Through this connection (with the Earl as his patron) he was licensed to preach as a Church of Scotland minister by the Presbytery of Cupar in September 1777. From 1777 until 1779 he served as an assistant at St Cuthbert's Church, Edinburgh.

He was ordained in September 1779 in Newbattle Parish Church near Dalkeith. With King George III himself as patron he was presented to St Cuthbert's Church, Edinburgh and in March 1786 moved to a new role as collegiate minister there, with Sir Henry Moncreiff-Wellwood as first charge minister. In 1793 he was made Chaplain in Ordinary to the King.

He died at the West Kirk Manse in Edinburgh on 27 October 1802. He is buried in the graveyard of St Cuthbert's. Several thousand attended his funeral, which was announced by handbill. The grave lies on the raised ground south-west of the church and was remodelled by his grandson James Balfour Paul around 1870 (replacing the original gravestone).

His position at St Cuthbert's was filled by David Dickson.

== Family ==
In April 1783 he married Susan Moncreiff (d.1828) daughter of Sir William Moncreiff and sister of Rev Henry Moncreiff-Wellwood is co-minister in St Cuthbert's. Their children included:

- Katharine Paul (b.1784) died in infancy
- Susan Paul (1795-1836) married Robert Tennant, a Glasgow merchant
- William Paul (1786-1848) accountant
- Robert Paul (1788-1866) manager of the Commercial Bank
- Agnes Paul (b.1790)
- Henry Paul (1791-1860) manager of the City of Glasgow Bank
- Archibald Paul (1792-1813)
- Rev John Paul (1795-1873) minister of St Cuthbert's, Moderator in 1847
- Catherine Isabella Paul (1797-1884).

Through the Balfours he was also related by his son's marriage to both the Balfours of Pilrig and the Stevenson engineer family including being great uncle to Robert Louis Stevenson.

== Artistic recognition ==
He is one of the many caricatures included in John Kay's Portraits. Kay states it was drawn from memory, after Paul's death.
