= David Dickson the Elder =

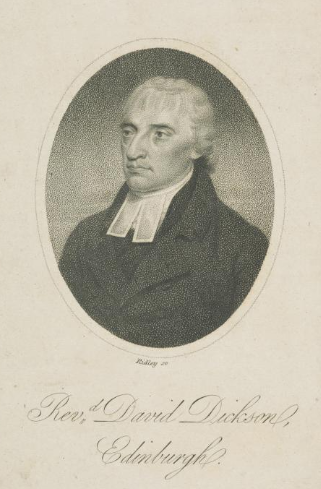
- Born: March 13th 1754
- Died: August 2d 1820

David Dickson of Persilands or David Dickson the Elder (1754–1820) was a Church of Scotland minister and father of David Dickson the Younger.

== Life ==
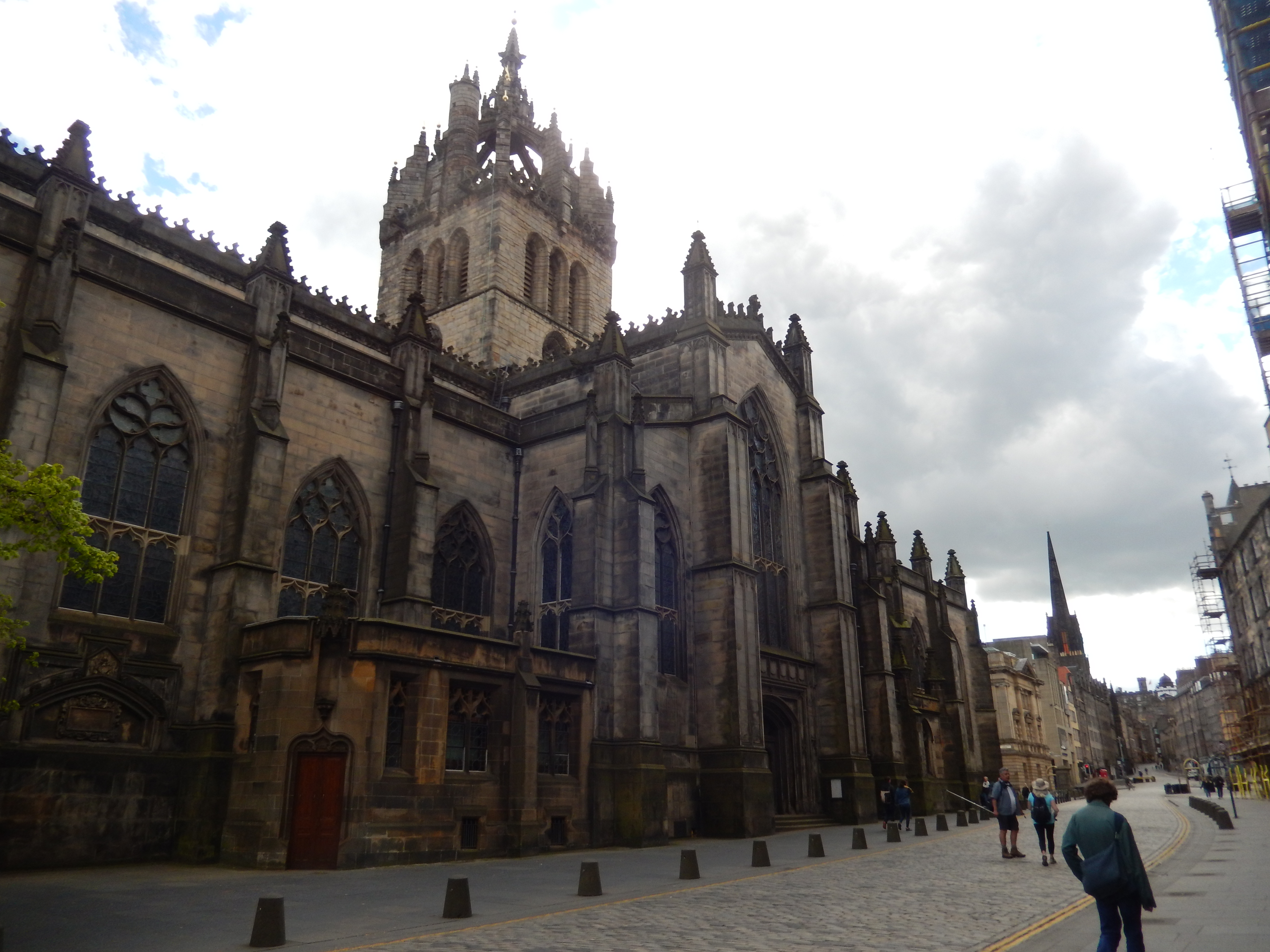
St. Giles' Cathedral

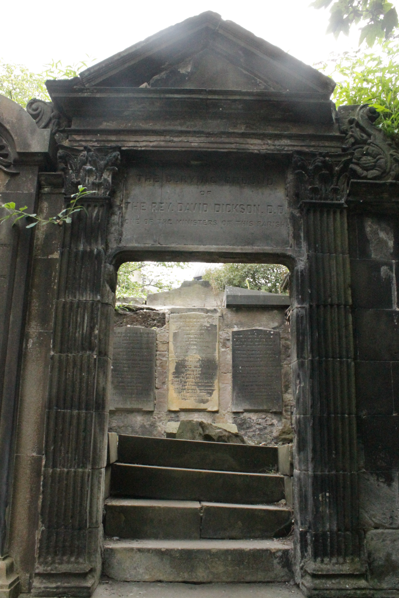
The grave of Rev David Dickson, St Cuthbert's Churchyard

He was born on 30 March 1754 the third son of Rev David Dickson of Kilbucho, minister of Newlands. He was educated at West Linton parish school, then in Peebles, He studied at Glasgow University and finished his theological training at Divinity Hall in Edinburgh. He was licensed to preach in August 1775 by the Presbytery of Biggar.

His first role was as assistant minister in Libberton in Lanarkshire, and in May 1777 he was ordained minister there in place of the previous minister. In July 1783 he translated to Bothkennar north of Falkirk. In 1792 he began assisting Rev Thomas Snell Jones at Lady Glenorchy's Church in Edinburgh but when no senior position arose he moved in October 1795 to the adjacent Canongate Chapel of Ease on New Street, an "overflow" church for Canongate Kirk required due the rapidly expanding population in the city. The main church at this time was under control of Rev Robert Walker. He moved briefly to the nearby Trinity College Church to the west in 1799 before settling in the New (West) Kirk in St Giles in November 1801: one of four parishes then contained in St Giles Cathedral, and one of the most important charges in Scotland.

In 1810 he was living at 28 York Place, Edinburgh.

He died at 13 Forth Street in Edinburgh at midnight on 2/3 August 1820. He is buried in a vault in the graveyard of St Cuthbert's Church, Edinburgh, where his son was minister.

== Family ==
In 1777 he married Christina Wardrobe (1755-1832) daughter of Rev Thomas Wardrobe of Bathgate. Their children included:

- Margaret (1778-1852)
- Rev David Dickson (1780-1842) minister of St Cuthbert's Church, Edinburgh
- John Dickson WS (1781-1823) advocate at 19 Nicolson St in Edinburgh
- William (b.1783)
- Anne (1787-1860)
- Elizabeth Somerville Dickson (1792-1843) married John Tawse, advocate, Secretary of the Society in Scotland for Propagating Christian Knowledge
- James Wardrobe Dickson (1794-1847) advocate, Sheriff Substitute of Falkirk
- Christian Wardrobe Dickson (1800-1802)

== Publications ==
- Account of Bothkennar
