= Robert Paul (painter) =

Rhodesian landscape painter (1906–1979)

- Born: Robert; 1906; Sutton, Surrey
- Died: 1979 (aged 72–73)
- Citizenship: England
- Occupation: Painter

Robert Fowler Paul (12 March 1906 – September 1980) was a Rhodesian landscape painter.

Paul was born in Sutton, Surrey, England. He joined the Rhodesian police force, the British South Africa Police, in 1927, and during patrols in his early years became enamoured of the local landscape. Self-taught as an artist, he would often bring his sketchbook along on his trips, recording the passing countryside. He was encouraged to paint by John Piper and Ivon Hitchens, who introduced him to the work of Georges Braque and other painters. Paul retired from the force in 1951 to paint full-time. He was considered the foremost painter in Rhodesia until his death in 1979; his works can be found in the National Gallery of Zimbabwe.
