= Bosbüll =

Bosbüll Bosbøl / Bousbel
- Municipality
- Flag Coat of arms

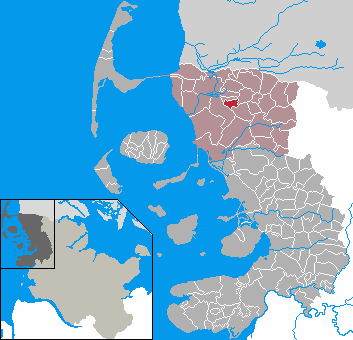
- Location of Bosbüll; Bosbøl / Bousbel within Nordfriesland district
- Interactive map of Bosbüll; Bosbøl / Bousbel
- Location within Germany Location within Schleswig-Holstein
- Coordinates: 54°49′32″N 8°51′47″E
- Country: Germany
- State: Schleswig-Holstein
- District: Nordfriesland
- Municipal assoc.: Südtondern

Government
  - Mayor: Peter Matthiesen

Area
  - Total: 6.33 km^{2} (2.44 sq mi)
- Elevation: 3 m (9.8 ft)

Population (2025-12-31)
  - Total: 265
  - Density: 41.9/km^{2} (108/sq mi)
- Time zone: UTC+01:00 (CET)
  - Summer (DST): UTC+02:00 (CEST)
- Postal codes: 25899
- Dialling codes: 04661
- Vehicle registration: NF
- Website: www.amt-suedtondern.de

Bosbüll (Danish: Bosbøl, North Frisian: Bousbel) is a municipality in the district of Nordfriesland, in Schleswig-Holstein, Germany.
