= Bateman Paul =

Anglican priest (1798–1877)

Robert Bateman Paul (10 October 1798 – 6 June 1877) was an Anglican priest in the 19th century.

Paul was born at St Columb Major in Cornwall and educated at Exeter College, Oxford. He was ordained deacon and priest in 1822. He was Fellow, Bursar, and Tutor at Exeter College until 1827. He then held incumbencies at Long Wittenham, Llantwit Major and Kentish Town. He was Archdeacon of Nelson, New Zealand from 1855 to 1860. On his return to England he was Rector of Stamford, Lincolnshire. He was also the Confrater of Browne's Hospital, Stamford. In 1871, he became a Prebendary of Lincoln Cathedral.
