= John Paul (minister) =

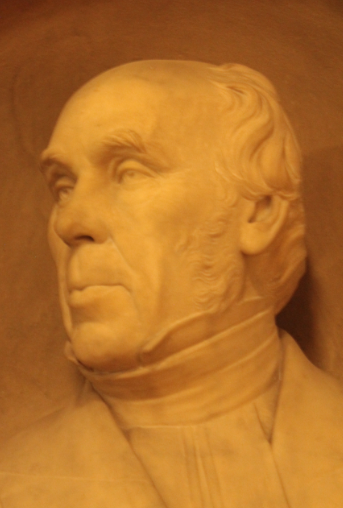
Bust of Rev John Paul in St Cuthbert's Church, Edinburgh

John Paul DD (1795–1873) was a minister of the Church of Scotland who served as Moderator of the General Assembly in 1847. A major figure in Edinburgh society, he was linked to both the Balfours of Leith and the Stevenson family of engineers.

== Life ==
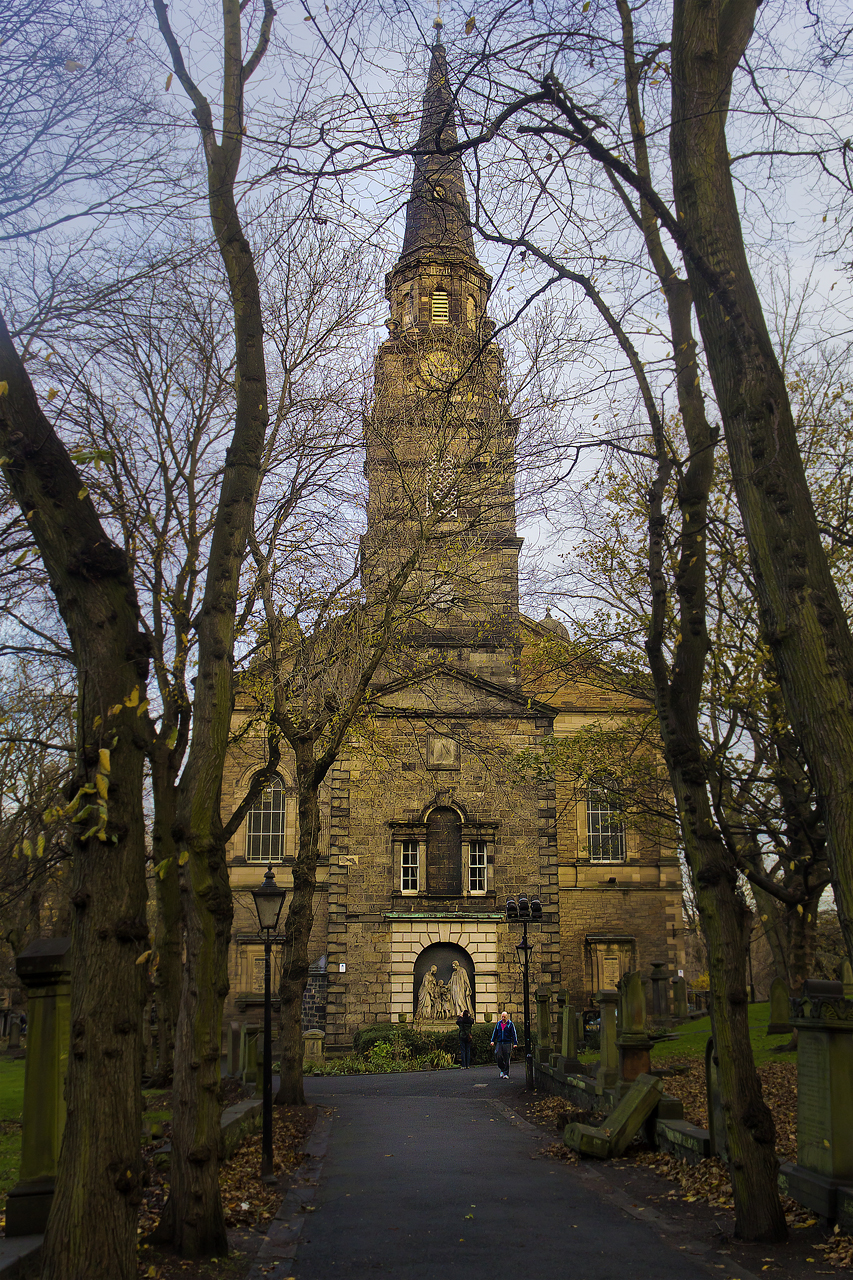
St Cuthberts Church from the west

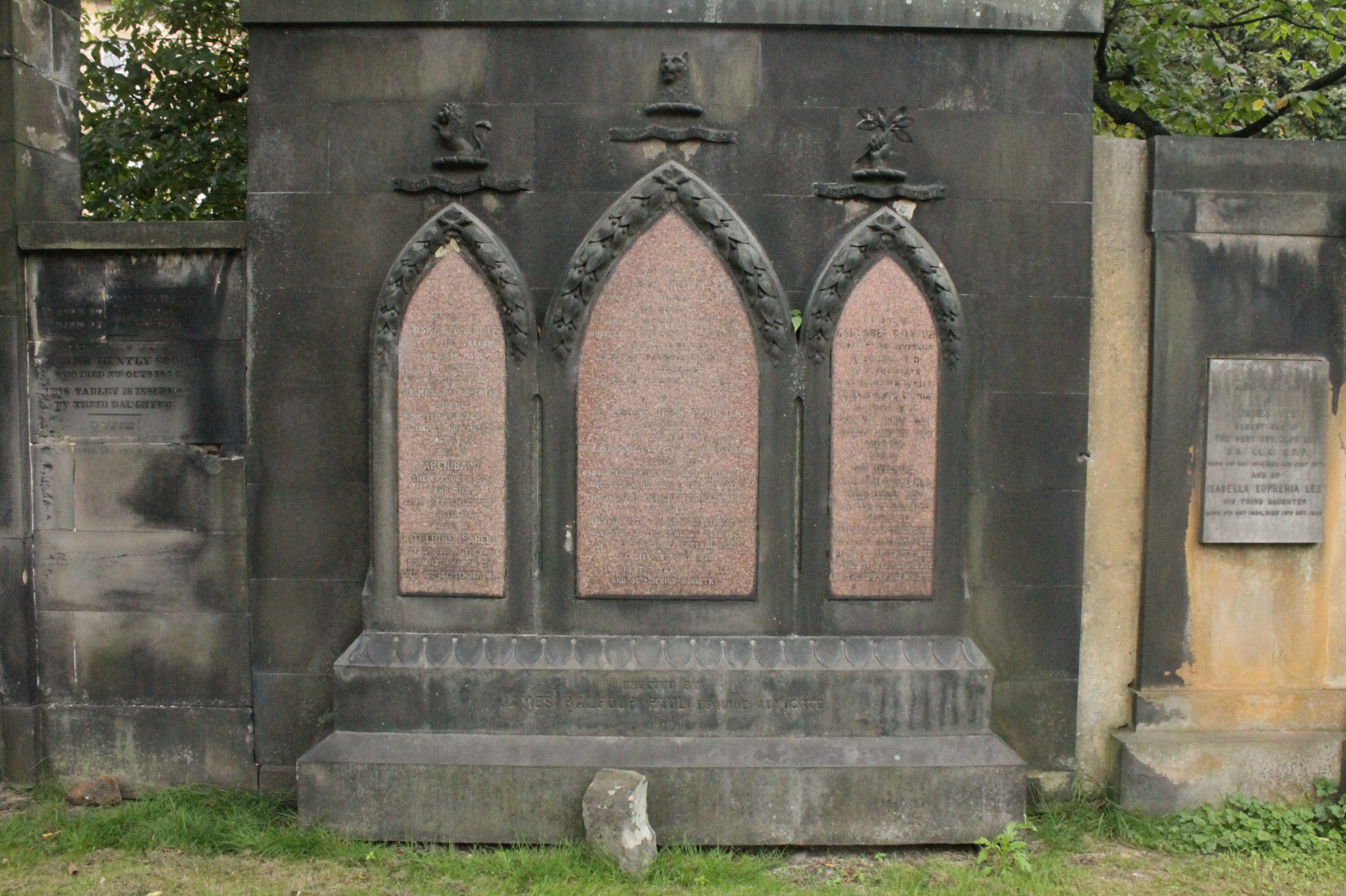
The grave of Rev John Paul, St Cuthbert's Churchyard, Edinburgh

He was born on 12 March 1795 the son of Rev William Paul (1754–1802), minister of the collegiate section of St Cuthbert's Church, Edinburgh and his wife Susan Moncrieff. He was also nephew of Rev Henry Moncrieff-Wellwood first charge minister of the same church. The family lived at Castlebarns in the Tollcross area south of the church. By 1805 his father had died and he was living with his mother in the West Kirk manse.

He was educated at the high school in the Old Town then studied at the University of Edinburgh. In August 1816 he was licensed to preach by the Presbytery of Edinburgh. He was ordained as minister of Straiton in May 1817. He was translated to Maybole in Ayrshire in September 1823.

On 17 April 1928 he was translated and admitted to St Cuthbert's, Edinburgh. In 1830 he was living at 13 George Square, Edinburgh.

He received an honorary Doctor of Divinity from the University of Edinburgh in 1847 and later that year was elected Moderator in succession to his brother James Paul. John was succeeded in turn in 1848 by Rev George Buist.

He died at 13 George Square on 18 May 1873. He is buried with his parents in St Cuthbert's Churchyard. The grave lies on the raised ground to the south-west. His position at St Cuthbert's was filled by Rev James MacGregor.

== Family ==
In 1830 he married Margaret Balfour (1807–1860), daughter of James Balfour of Pilrig and granddaughter of James Balfour. Their children included:

- Rev William Paul, minister of Whitekirk (1832–1866)
- James Balfour Paul father in turn to John William Balfour Paul and Arthur Forman Balfour Paul.

Through the Balfours he was also related by marriage to the Stevenson engineer family, including uncle to Robert Louis Stevenson.

== Artistic recognition ==
His portrait by Augustin Edouart is held by the Scottish National Portrait Gallery.

A fine high relief medallion portrait of Paul by William Brodie lies inside St Cuthbert's.
