= Robert Paul (banker) =

Scottish banker

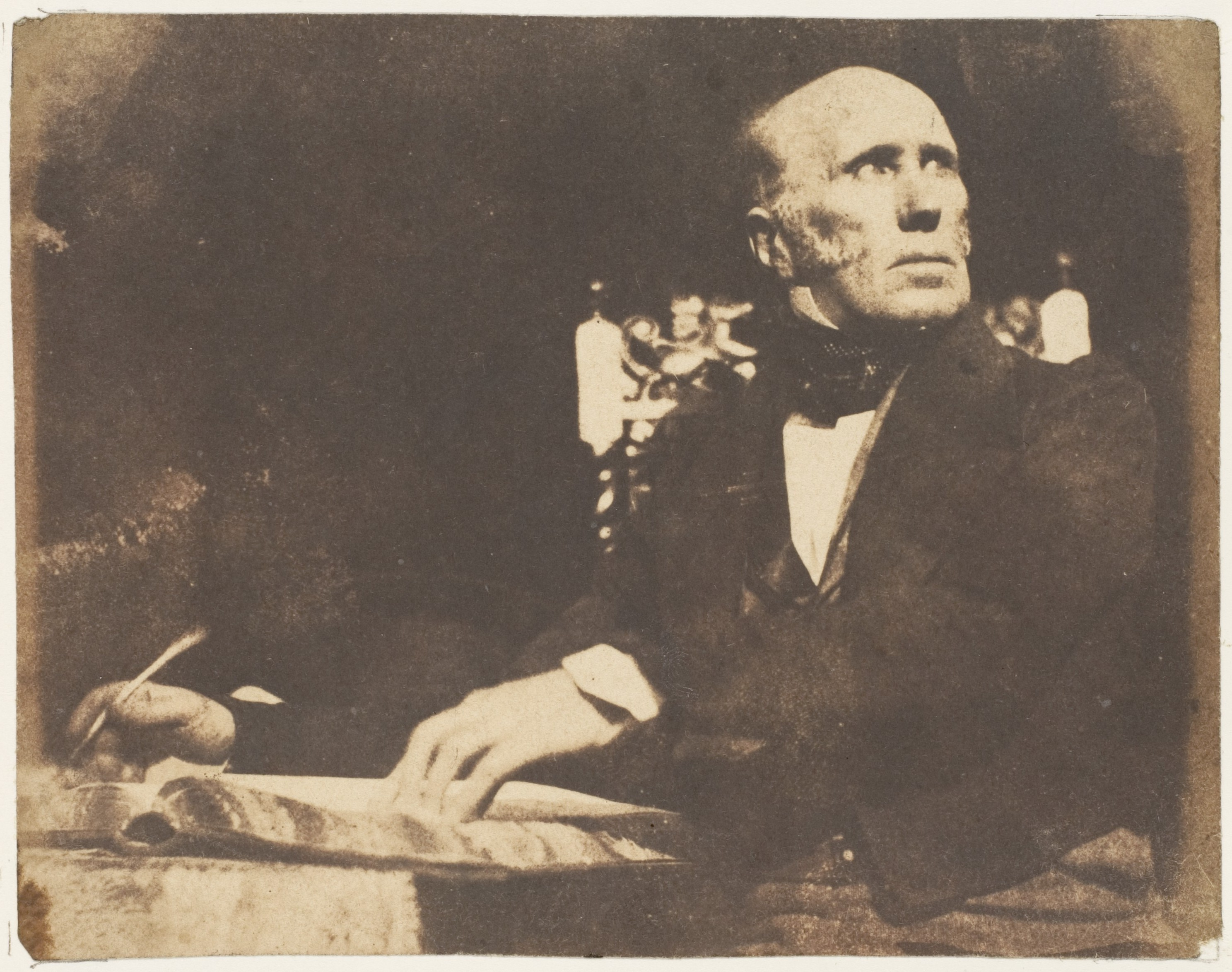
- Robert Paul by Hill & Adamson

Personal details
- Born: 15 May 1788
- Died: 16 July 1866 (aged 78)
- Parents: William Paul; Susan Moncreiff
- Spouse: Charlotte Erskine (m. 1814; died 1847)

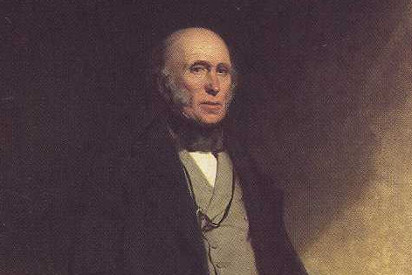
Robert Paul of the Commercial Bank of Scotland

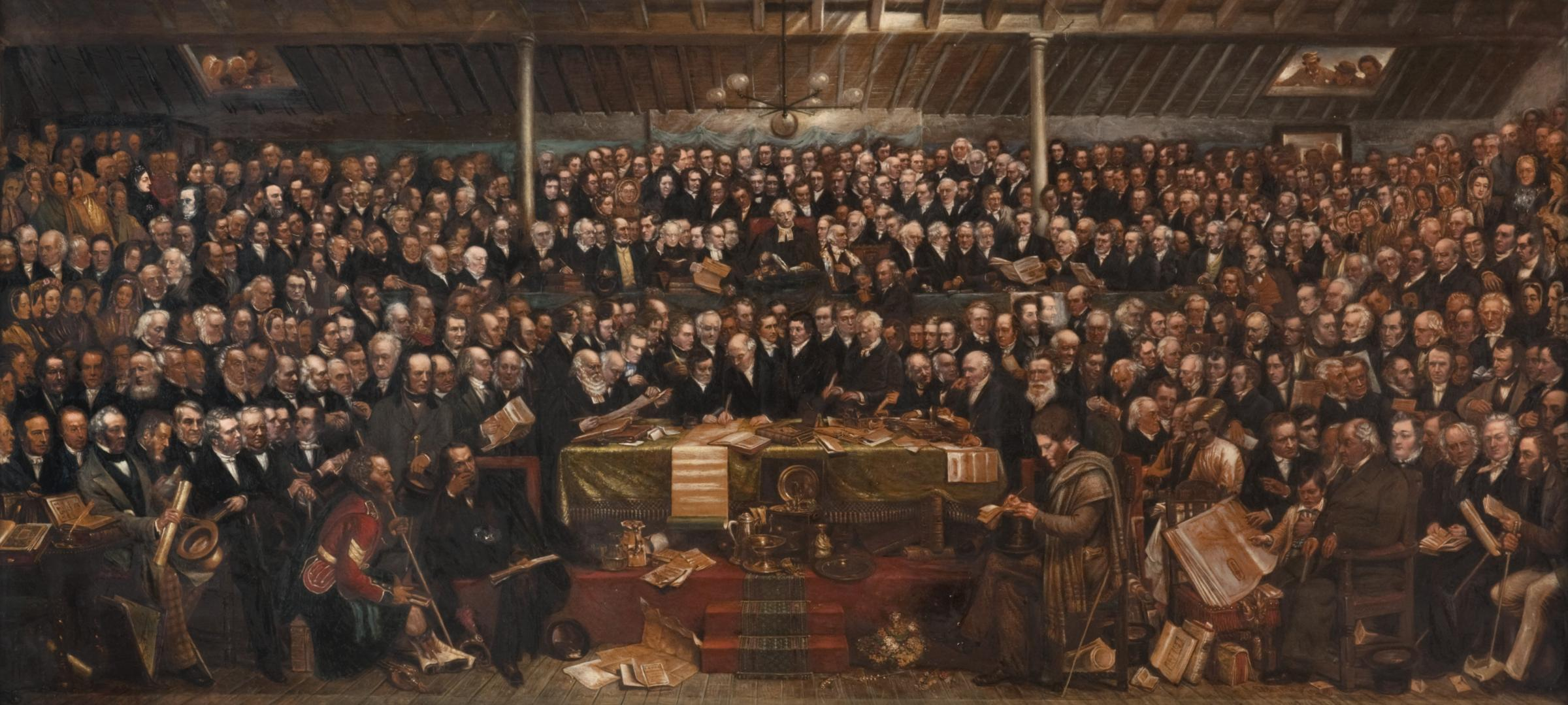
Paul is depicted in the Disruption painting. NatWest's website says "Of the figures seated around the table at the centre of the composition, Robert Paul is third from the right."

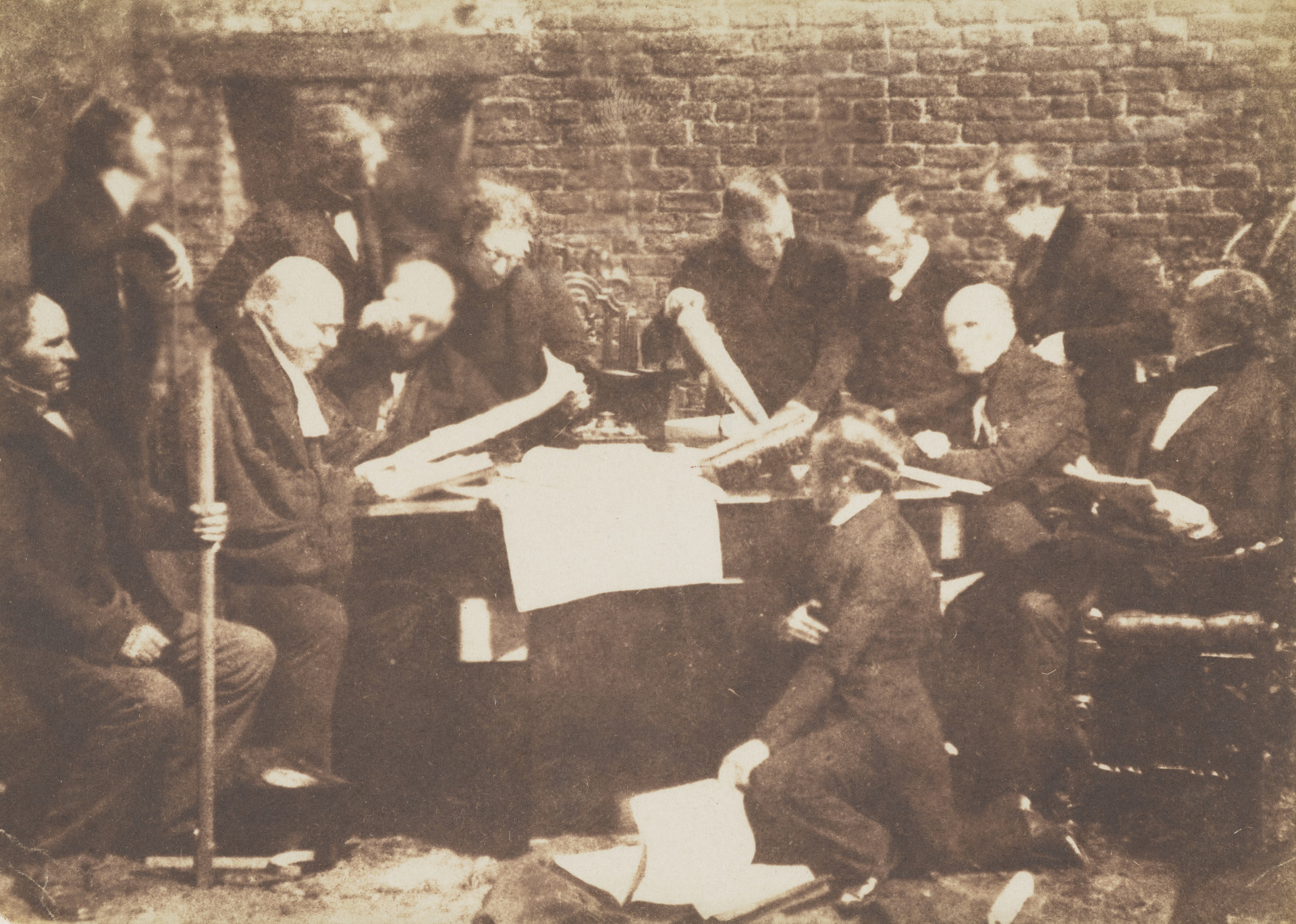
Free Church Committee. Possibly Sergeant Mackenzie, unknown man, Patrick Clason, James Crawford, William Fraser, possibly Rev. John Jeffray, W.G. Clark (kneeling) unknown man, Robert Paul, unknown man and Archibald Bonar

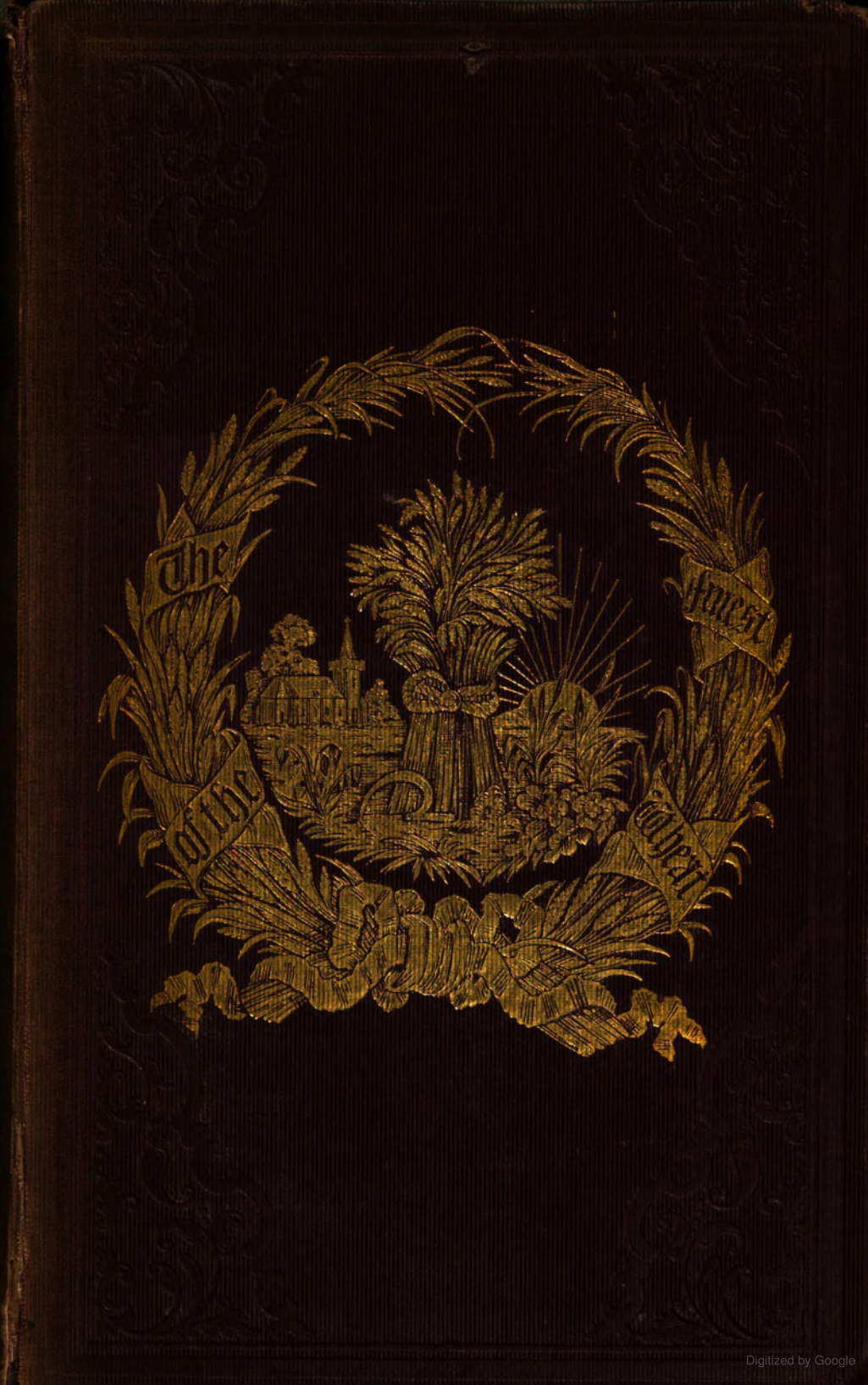
The Finest of the Wheat - by Robert Paul

Robert Paul was a Scottish banker and church elder that was director of the Commercial Bank of Scotland.

He was born at St. Cuthbert's Manse in Edinburgh on the 15 May 1788. He was educated at the High School and University of Edinburgh. He subsequently entered the Bank of Ramsay, Bonar and Company, Edinburgh, in 1807. Paul was appointed first Accountant to the Commercial Bank of Scotland, which commenced business in Picardy Place, Edinburgh, in 1810; Secretary of the Bank 31 July 1823, and Manager 17 December 1835, which office he held till he retired in December 1853. He then became a Director of the Bank, and continued to be so till his death, which took place at Kirkland Lodge, Hermiston, near Edinburgh, 16 July 1866.

A memoir of him was written by his old friend Benjamin Bell, in 1872. He is remembered for his place in the history of Scottish banking and as an influential elder in the lead up to, and the early days of, the Free Church of Scotland. He was the sitter in portraits by Hill & Adamson and by John Watson Gordon.

== Early life and ancestry ==
Robert Paul was born at Edinburgh on 15 May 1788. His father, William Paul, was Colleague of Henry Moncreiff in the pastorate of the West Kirk, and in 1780 married Miss Susan Moncreiff, Sir Henry's sister. At the time of his father's death, on 27 October 1802, Robert was only fourteen years of age. He had an older brother, William. Robert was younger by two years and they had other younger siblings: Henry (October 1791), Archibald (1792), John (1795), Catherine (1782), Susan (1784), and Catherine Isabella born 13 March 1797.

Having completed his High School and University curriculum, he commenced business life. NatWest says: "In summer 1803 Paul began an apprenticeship in the office of Pitcairn & Scott, writers to the signet. Alexander Pitcairn, one of the firm’s partners, was a friend of the Paul family. Robert Paul was a close friend of Pitcairn’s son David, and regarded Pitcairn himself as ‘my second father’."

They continue: "When Paul’s apprenticeship ended in 1807, Pitcairn arranged a job for him in the private bank Ramsay, Bonars & Co." After he entered the Commercial Bank in one of its subordinate appointments, he rose to be its Manager, which office he held until 1853, when he retired, but became one of the Bank Directors. He married, in 1814, Miss Charlotte Erskine of Aberdona — a union which endured, until 1847, when he was left a widower.

== Other interests ==
Never a keen party man in State politics, he threw himself into such movements as those connected with Slavery and the Test and Corporation Acts, his sympathies with everything that advanced the cause of freedom leading him to associate himself in these and other questions with the Liberal party. But his available leisure and strength were reserved for Church matters. Hereditarily attached to evangelical opinion as regarded both doctrine and discipline, he had formed his own judgments regarding these matters; and then he threw himself into the current of affairs which deepened in interest and importance until the Church threw off its State connection in the Disruption of 1843.

== At the Disruption ==
On 3 June 1843, writing to a distance of the great events of the past weeks, he says, "God will overrule all for His own glory in the advancement of His spiritual church and kingdom."

Mr Paul was ordained an elder of the West Kirk by Sir Henry Moncreiff in 1816; and it was not until after the Disruption that he became an elder of St George's. His admiration of Robert Smith Candlish, between whom and himself a very true and tender friendship existed, was great.

Administrating arrangements consequent on the Church's new condition, he was specially concerned with matters affecting the Theological College and Library and the Educational Schemes of the Free Church, associated in addressing these questions with his friend David Welsh.

He regularly attended the annual General Assembly, where his connections with ministers and elders from across Scotland led him to host members who travelled to attend the gathering.

In his latest days the work in which he was most deeply interested was the formation of a Society for aiding the education and business training of the sons and daughters of ministers and missionaries of the Free Church.

Among the many benevolent institutions in whose welfare he was interested, and in the management of which he took part, was the Orphan Hospital. From a very early period of life he was one of its Managers, and contributed to lay the foundations of the institution.

His Memoir of the Rev. James Martin, who succeeded Dr Andrew Thomson as Minister of St George's, and his many contributions to the periodical publications of the day, illustrate his literary power. He also wrote a memoir to Dr. Jones published in an appendix to a book on Chalmers. It was published in the same year as his book The Finest of the Wheat.

His villa of Kirkland Lodge, near Edinburgh, including its bowling-green, with a view of the Pentlands and the intervening valley, were used by Paul for entertaining guests.

== Last days ==
In April 1866 the process of physical decline was accelerated, but the mind and heart were fresh. On 22 May, within two months of his death, he wrote: "This day the General Assembly meets, and it does seem a strange thing, that instead of being there in the thick of it, I should be here reposing in quiet and comparative solitude."

On the night before he died he was carried in his chair to be present at the meeting, which was that night held under Kirkland roof, and the services of which were conducted by his friend the Rev. J. H. Wilson of the Barclay Church. In the early morning of 16 July 1866, he died.

== Family ==
He married, 15 April 1814, Charlotte, daughter of John Erskine, younger of Alva, by his wife Christian, eldest daughter of John Carruthers of Holmains, Dumfriesshire. By her, who was born 15 May 1789, and died at Kirkland Lodge 10 September 1847, he had issue :

- (1) William, born 24 January and died 18 February 1815.
- (2) Christian Erskine, born 23 June 1816, and died, unmarried, at Bridge of Allan, 24 May 1889.
- (3) William, born at Edinburgh 27 April 1818, appointed agent for the Commercial Bank in Dumbarton 4 May 1843, and at Glasgow 6 September 1849. Died at Edinburgh 19 February 1865, having married at Inverness, 23 July 1844, Mary, eldest daughter of John Anderson, "W.S., and had issue : —
  - i. Robert, born at Dumbarton 18 May 1845; ordained minister of the Free Church, Coldstream, 11 August 1870; translated to the Free Church, Dollar, 1 May 1879; and died 27 July 1910. Author of numerous papers on archaeological and genealogical subjects. Married, at Ferry-Port-on-Craig, co. Fife, in 1872, Christina Croll, eldest daughter of the Rev. W. P. Falconer, Free Church minister there, by his wife Christina, daughter of the Rev. Dr. William Meek, of Hamilton. By her, who was born 29 October 1844, and died 30 January 1906, he had issue :
    - (i) William Moncreiff, born at Coldstream 13 October 1873, L.K.C.S.E., L.R.C.P.E., L.F.P. and S.G., April 1899, M.B., Ch.M., July 1899. Married, 28 July 1902, Agnes, youngest daughter of John Shaw, Edinburgh. She died in August 1904.
    - (ii) Christina Erskine, born 31 October 1875.
    - (iii) Robert Carruthers, born 10 September 1877. Entered the Commercial Bank,
    - (iv) Henry Erskine, born 18 March 1880, died 12 May 1882.
    - (v) Mary Anderson, born 16 January 1882, died 18 July 1893.
    - (vi) Charlotte Elizabeth Abercrombie, born 20 October 1884.
  - ii. John Anderson, born 18 September 1846.
  - iii. William, born 19 April 1850, died 30 July 1853.
  - iv. Elizabeth Mackenzie, born 8 November 1857; married, 17 November 1886, Herbert Sloman, L.R.C.P., M.R.C.S., now in Bedford, and has issue, one son :
    - (i) Basil, born 18 September 1888.
  - v. Charlotte Erskine, born 26 December 1861; married, 4 October 1882, Sydney Hume Lynn, D.A.C.G. (now Colonel), and has issue :
    - (i) Mollie, born 13 August 1863, married, 7 April 1906, Capt. K..L. Stevenson, R.A., and has issue.
- (4) John Erskine, born 20 February 1820, died 30 January 1850.
- (5) Susan Moncreiff, born 26 December 1821, died 16 July 1833.
- (6) Robert Henry, born 3 April 1824, died 30 October 1825.
- (7) Charlotte, born 10 July 1826, died 3 June 1827.
- (8) Charlotte Jane, born 6 November 1828, died 12 March 1831.
- (9) Isabella Catherine, born 13 May 1834; married, first, 1 December 1854, David Parker, C.E., who died at Madeira 30 July 1859; secondly, 15 November 1873, Alexander Bryce, C.E., who died at Charters Towers 28 January 1884. By her first husband she had issue :
  - i. John Harold Erskine, born 2 September 1855, became an officer in the Army, and died at Naini Tal, India, 5 May 1879.
  - ii. Robert Paul, born 31 May 1857, and died at Windsor, New South Wales, 24 December 1895.
- By her second husband she had issue :
  - iii. Leslie, born 1875, died in infancy,
  - iv. George Ronald, born 1 February 1880.
