= Mounting block =

Raised platform for mounting and dismounting a horse or vehicle

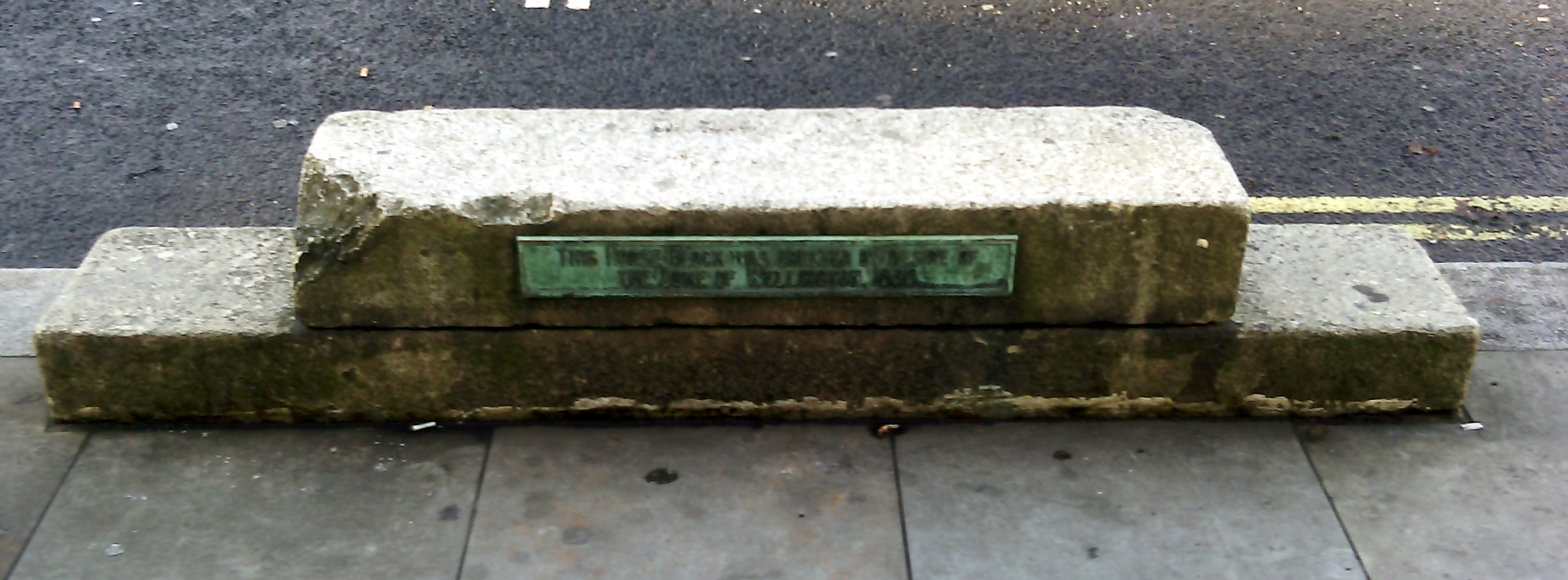
The Duke of Wellington's mounting block, Athenaeum Club, London

A mounting block, horse block, carriage stone, or in Scots a loupin'-on stane is an assistance for mounting and dismounting a horse or cart.

== Usage and locations ==
Mounting blocks were especially useful for women riding sidesaddle or pillion, that is 'riding double', allowing a horse to be mounted or dismounted without a loss of modesty. Women would often ride behind their husbands and servants who were on foot. They were also used to assist ladies and men into and out of carts. They were frequently located outside churches or kirks for the use of parishioners attending services, funerals, etc. Often they were located in the main streets and outside public houses. In Yorkshire some were built at the top of steep lanes, where the rider would remount after leading his horse up the slope.

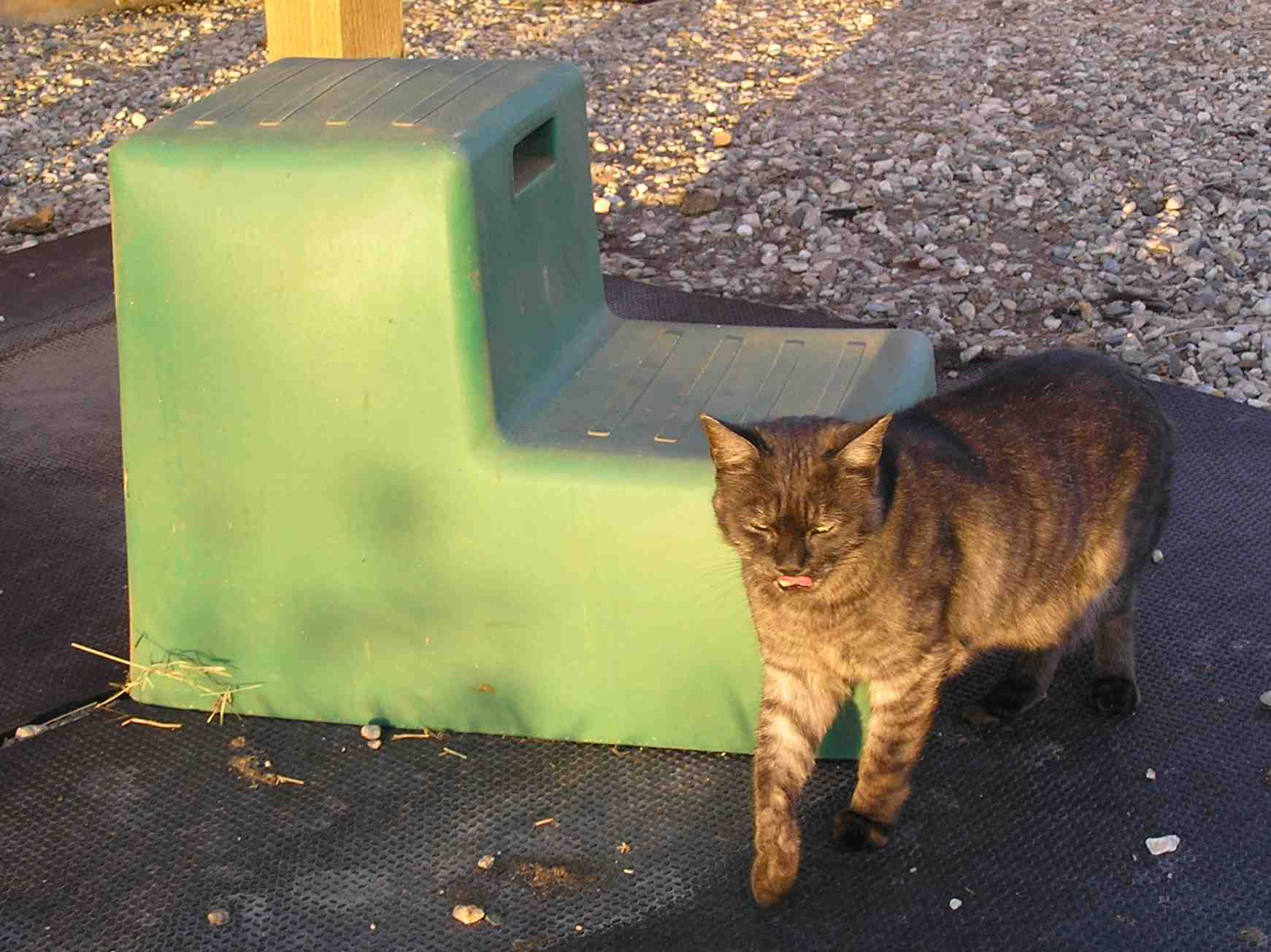
A modern mounting block, and cat for scale.

Mounting blocks today are primarily used by modern equestrians who are a) beginners b) people who have difficulty mounting (either a tall horse, or a short person, or someone with some mobility impairments) and c) people who feel that use of a mounting block reduces strain on the spine of the horse, particularly at the withers. Modern mounting blocks are usually made of wood or of molded plastic.

== Construction ==
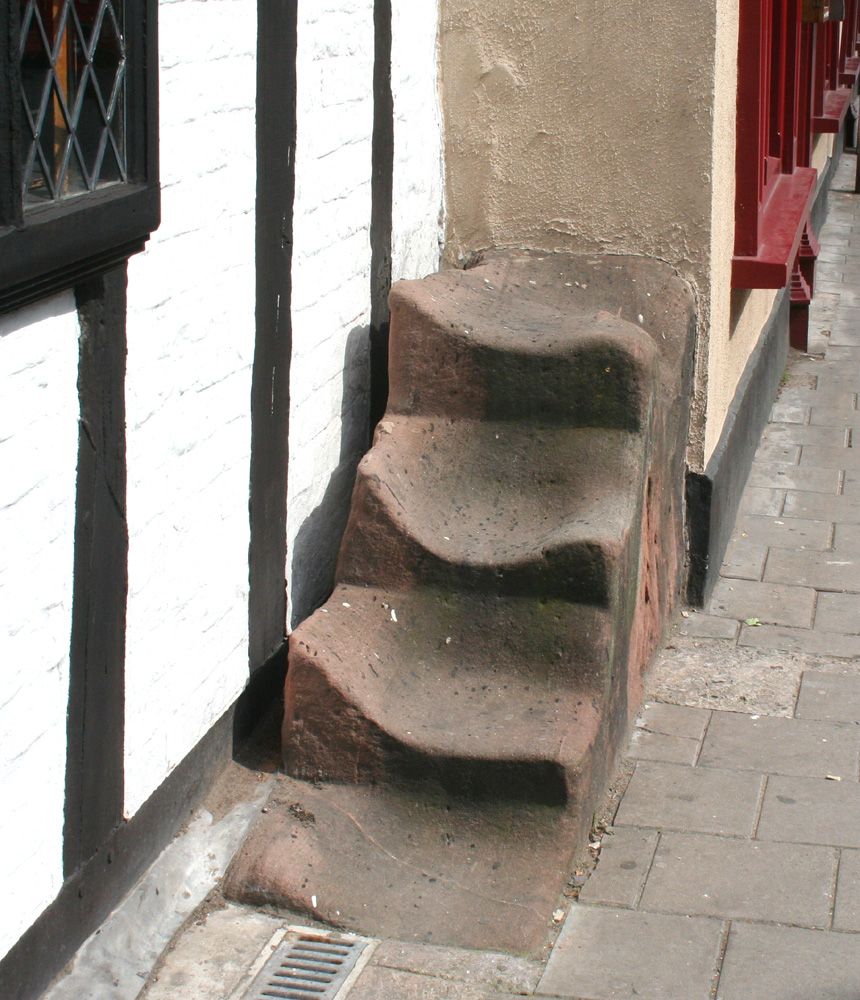
Stepped mounting block in Nantwich, Cheshire

Mounting blocks were usually made from stone or wood and prior to the era of the motor car they were very common. Some have three or more steps leading up to a platform which gave extra height and therefore easier access to the saddle and less chance of falling when dismounting. A few had a wall or some other support to one side of the steps, as at Saint Boswells. Some were built as memorials and bear inscriptions. They were built with bricks, ashlar and even occasionally from a single stone block, whilst an example at Shewalton Mill in North Ayrshire is a glacial erratic boulder located in the mill yard.

== Using a mounting block ==
A horse is best mounted using a mounting block because it is easier for the rider to mount the horse, it puts less strain on the stirrup leathers when mounting and it decreases the chances of the saddle slipping to one side when mounting, thereby reducing the chances of a fall and possible injury to the rider. A horse or pony is mounted from the "near" side, that is the horse's left side.

== Decline in use of mounting blocks ==
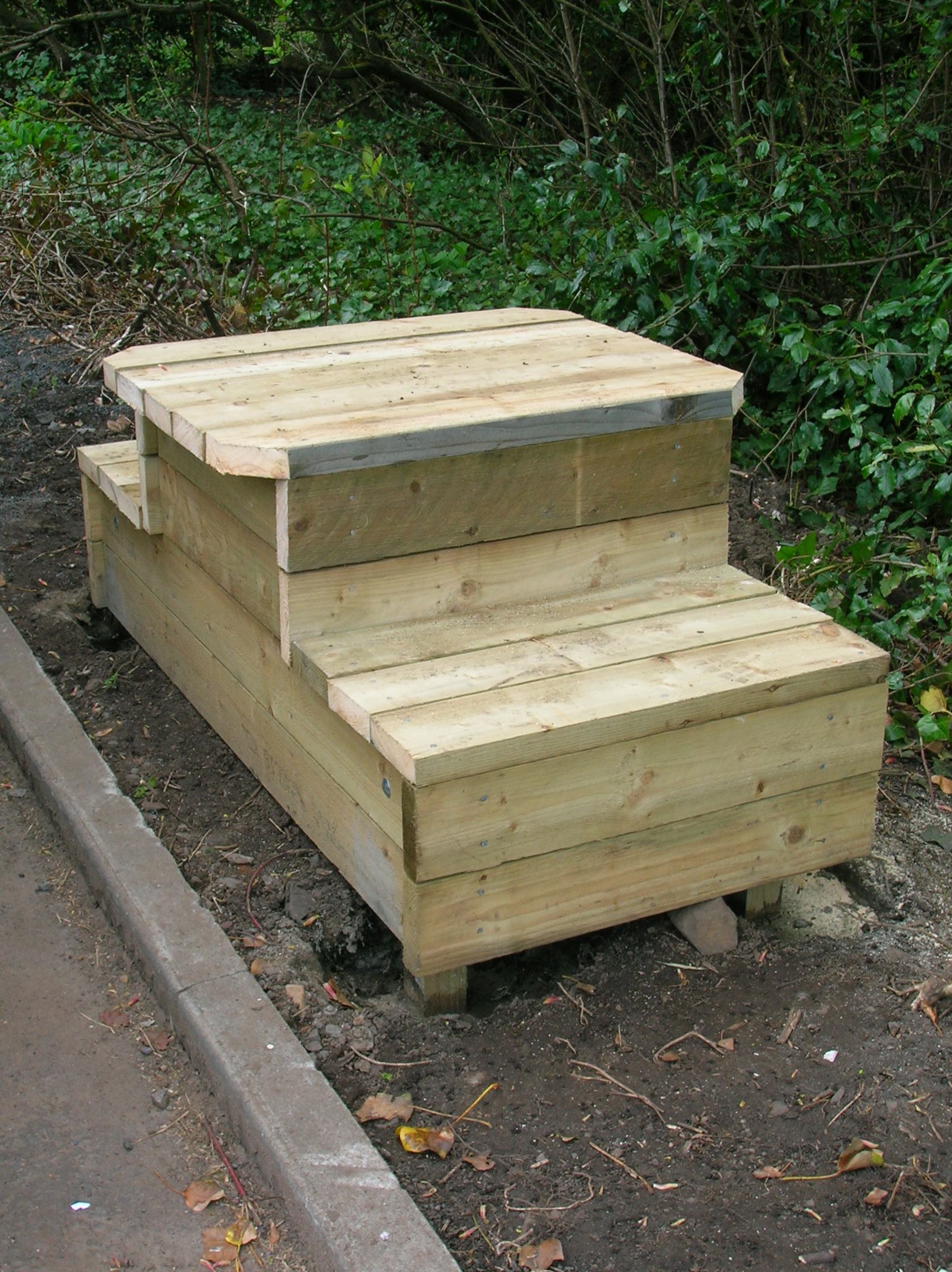
A mounting block in a Country Park, Eglinton, Ayrshire.

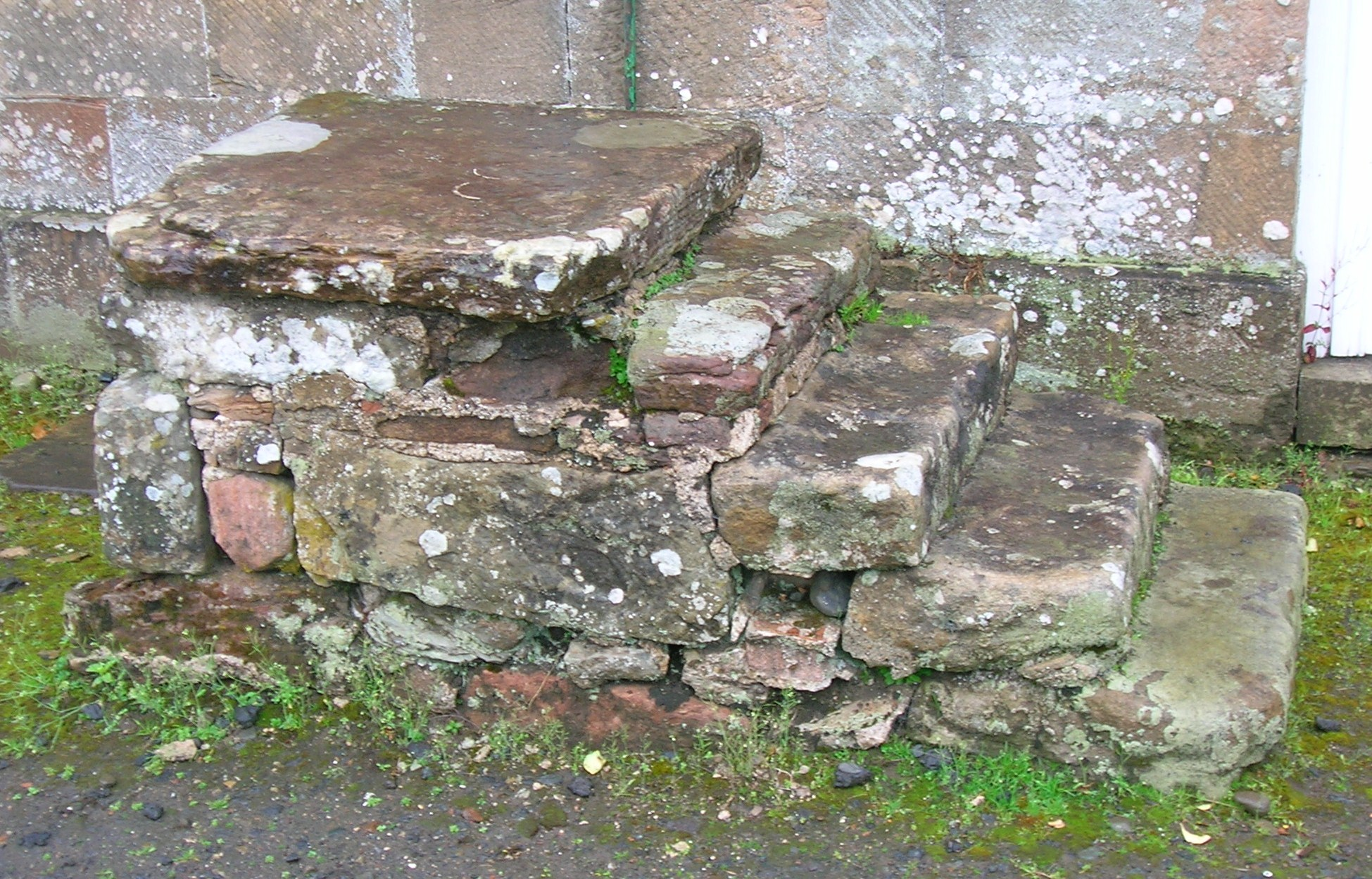
Old mounting block at Dumfries House, Scotland.

Mounting blocks were a common feature up until the late 18th century. They are still used at equestrian centres, but are no longer a common feature of inns, churches, farms, country houses, etc. in the United Kingdom, where they were once almost an obligatory feature.

The generally poor condition of roads up until the late 18th century in Scotland for example, meant that most passenger transport by horse was literally on horseback. For instance, wheeled vehicles were practically unknown to farmers in Ayrshire until the end of the 18th century, and prior to this sledges or slide-cars were used to haul loads as wheeled vehicles were useless. The roads had been mere tracks and such bridges as there were could only take pedestrians, men on horseback or pack-animals. The first recorded wheeled vehicles to be used in Ayrshire were carts offered gratis to labourers working on Riccarton Bridge, Kilmarnock, in 1726.

Once wheeled vehicles became commonplace the need for horse mounting blocks would have greatly decreased, thus mounting block as a permanent fixture went out with changing times. You didn't need one for getting into carriages, and thus as roads got better and fewer people rode, the need decreased. With the invention of the automobile, the need for the public mounting block vanished and they now are used exclusively by equestrians or retained as historic features at old inns, kirks, etc.

In the 1860s, those mounting blocks that remained in London e.g. Bayswater, were thought of as quaint and old fashioned "in the true style of olden times".

== A Loupin' on stane poem ==
Tam o' Crumstan

"A loupin' on stane is a very good thing,
For a man that is stiff, for a man that is auld,
For a man that is lame o' the leg or the spauld,
Or short o' the houghs, to loup on his naggie;

So said Tam o' Crumstane, unbousome and baggie;
And mountin' the stane at Gibbie's house-end,
Like a man o' great pith, wi' a grane, and a stend
He flew owre his yaud, and fell i' the midden!

== Standing stones, stone rows, etc. ==
At Eskdalemuir in Dumfries and Galloway, the remains of a 'stone avenue' are known as the Loupin' Stanes due to the similarity with said structures. The Wolfcleuchhead, 'Loupin' Stone', Mounting Steps or Mounting Block is in the parish of Roberton, Scottish Borders. This stone bears two carved heads and lettering; on the other the name 'Wolfcleuchead'. These names have arisen either from the appearance or the actual re-use of these stones.

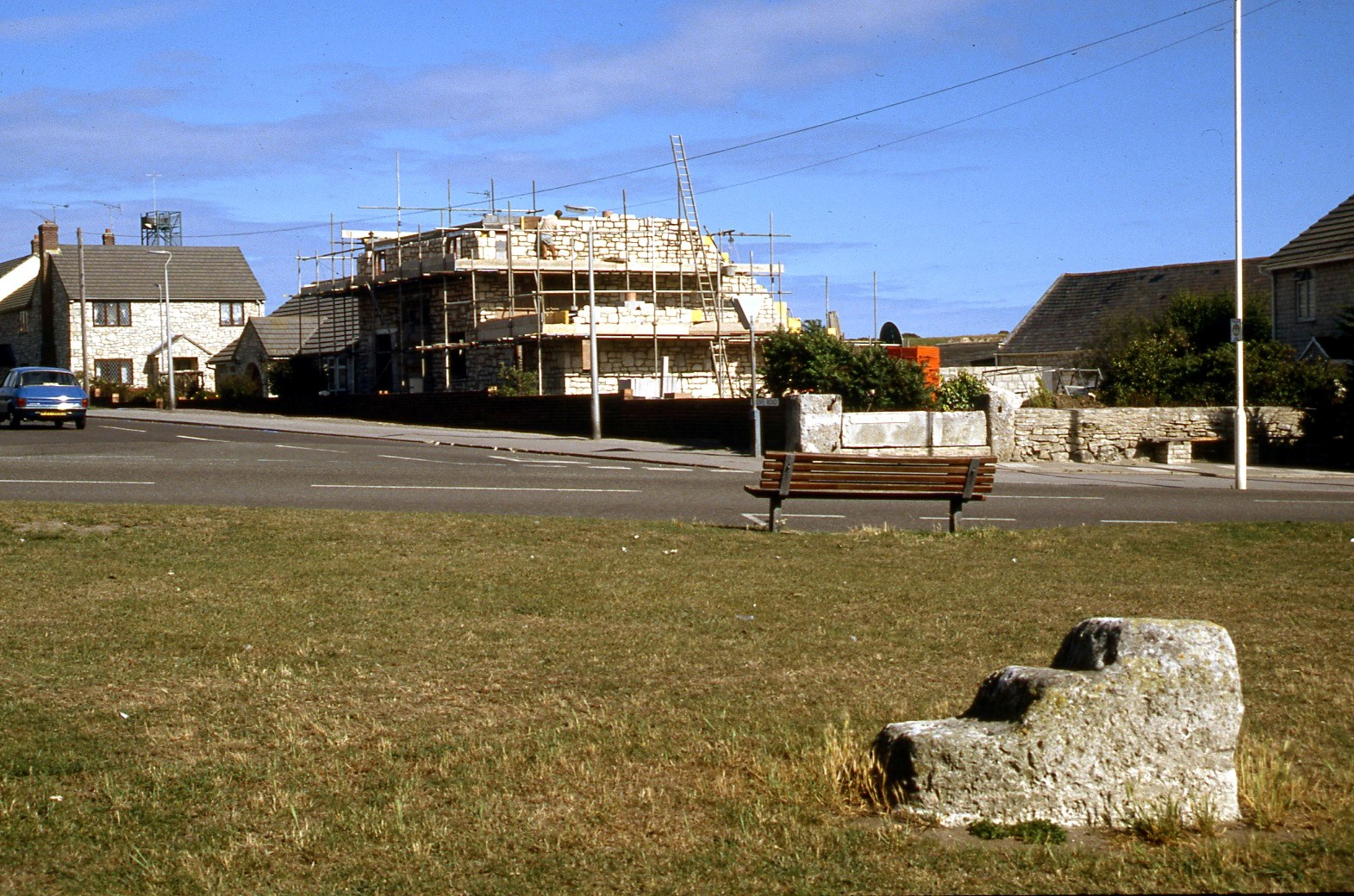
An ancient mounting block on the Isle of Portland, Dorset.

== Examples and sites of mounting blocks ==
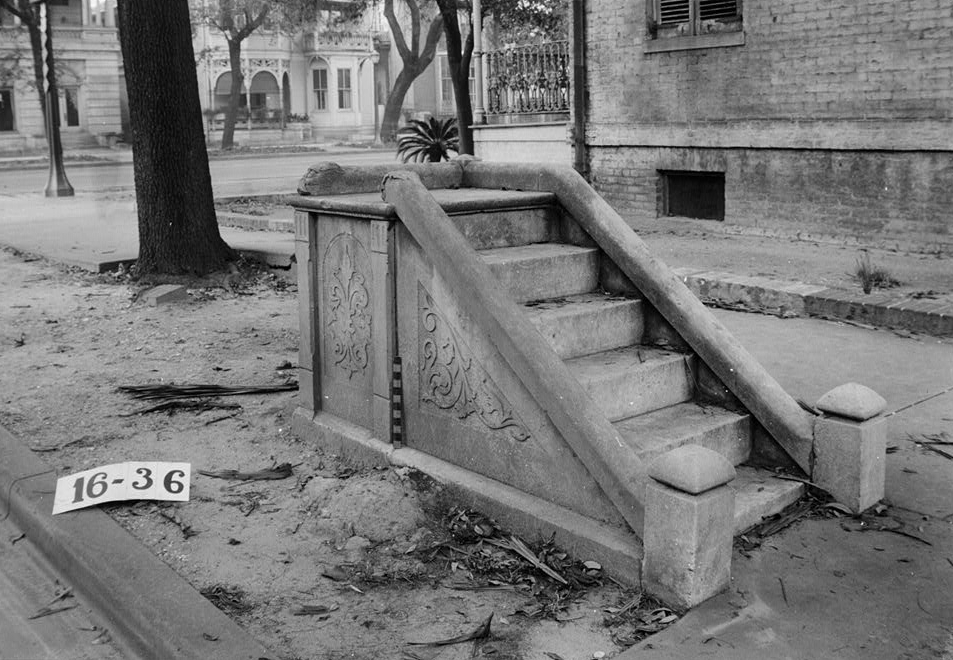
Elaborate mounting block on Government Street in Mobile, Alabama.

- In Aberlady, East Lothian there was a Loupin' on stane with six steps. It figures in a 1935 photograph in the Valentine collection held by the St. Andrew's Photographic Archive.
- The kirk of Saint Dodins (NT 2832 7261) at Duddingston in Edinburgh still has its Loupin-an-stane.
- East Kilbride in Lanarkshire has an ancient Coaching Inn which is still in use today. Outside the inn is the "Loupin' on Stane", used by coast passenger and horse riders to assist in mounting and dismounting.
- At the front of Rowallan Castle in Ayrshire stood a perfect example of an old loupin-on-stane.
- In front of Jedburgh's Bank of Scotland branch, in the grounds, is the "Loupin' - on - stane". At one time, this was the house of one of Sir Walter Scott’s friends, Sheriff Shortreed.

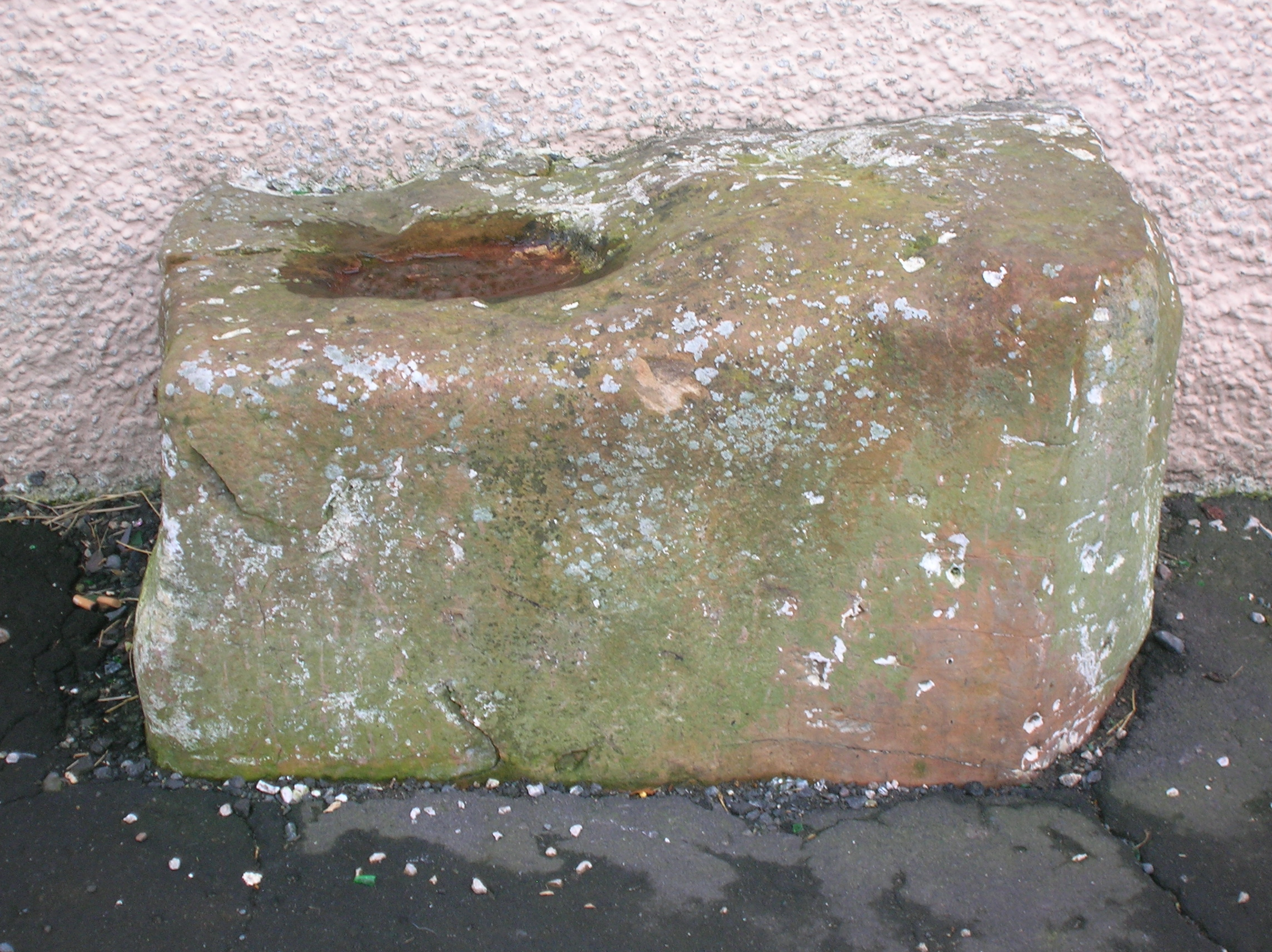
The Loupin'-on-stane & concavity at Kilmaurs

- In the yard at the old Shewalton Mill on the River Irvine in North Ayrshire is a glacial erratic boulder that was retained as a useful loupin on stane.
- Outside the Old Person's Cabin in the main street of Kilmaurs in East Ayrshire is a large sandstone block which was a horse-block or Loupin'-on-stane. This large sandstone block also has a concavity in its upper surface which is reminiscent of the 'plague stones' which would be filled with vinegar into which money could be placed either as gifts to the church or as gifts to the sick. It has possibly been reused, however no local traditions survive concerning it. An example of a plague stone used by lepers survives at Greystoke village church in Cumbria.
- Outside the Cellars Inn at the seaside village of Maidens in South Ayrshire were a set of Loupin stanes which are said to have been used by Robbie Burns.
- Oxnam in the Scottish Borders has a loupin stane outside the kirk.
- On the shores of Loch Lomond, this old priory is the scene of a curse, for after the Battle of Culloden in 1746, where Bonnie Prince Charlie had his Jacobite uprising quashed, the Marquess of Tullibardine fled for his life. He came to Ross Priory and asked James Buchanan, 5th of Ross, for a safe house. James however secretly sent word to Dumbarton Castle and King George’s soldiers duly arrived and took him away as a prisoner. The Marquess called to Buchanan with a curse There will be Murrays on the Braes of Atholl land when there’s ne’er a Buchanan at the Ross. In fulfilment of that curse, all three sons of that marriage died before their father- the last of them breaking his neck at the “loupin’ stane” at the front door.
- The old village of Rossie in what is now Perth and Kinross, was demolished by the 7th Earl of Kinnaird about 1795 when constructing a park for Rossie Priory. All that remains are the parish church, a fine market cross which stood in the centre of the village and a stone called the 'Loupin-on Stane' at Map reference: NO 2921 3072. The Loupin-on stane formerly stood by the village inn door.
- At Mertoun Kirk, beside the driveway up to the church, is a red sandstone loupin an stane with a set of steps up the back allowing the rider to come forward some 4 feet above ground level. Unusually it has a side wall, acting as a 'hand rail', to help the person mounting.
- On the Isle of Portland, an ancient mounting block opposite the site of the Crown Farm, Easton.
- A Welsh example of a mounting block at Tanylan near Ferryside in Carmarthenshire has a set of steps leading up to a platform with the gable end of the house on the persons right-hand side. It stands on two short wall supports and the space below was used as a dog kennel.
- An English example of a mounting block stands outside a former public house on Welsh Row in Nantwich, Cheshire. It has four steps cut from a single stone block and probably dates from the 17th or 18th century.

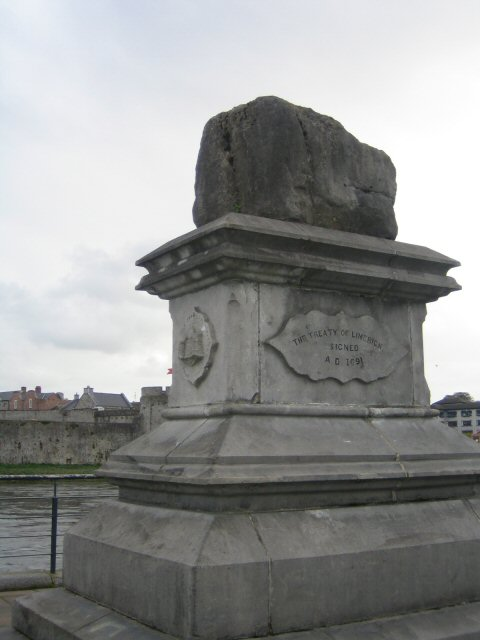
The Treaty Stone in Limerick, previously used as a mounting block, now stands on a pedestal

- The Treaty Stone in Limerick, Ireland originally served as a mounting block for horses.

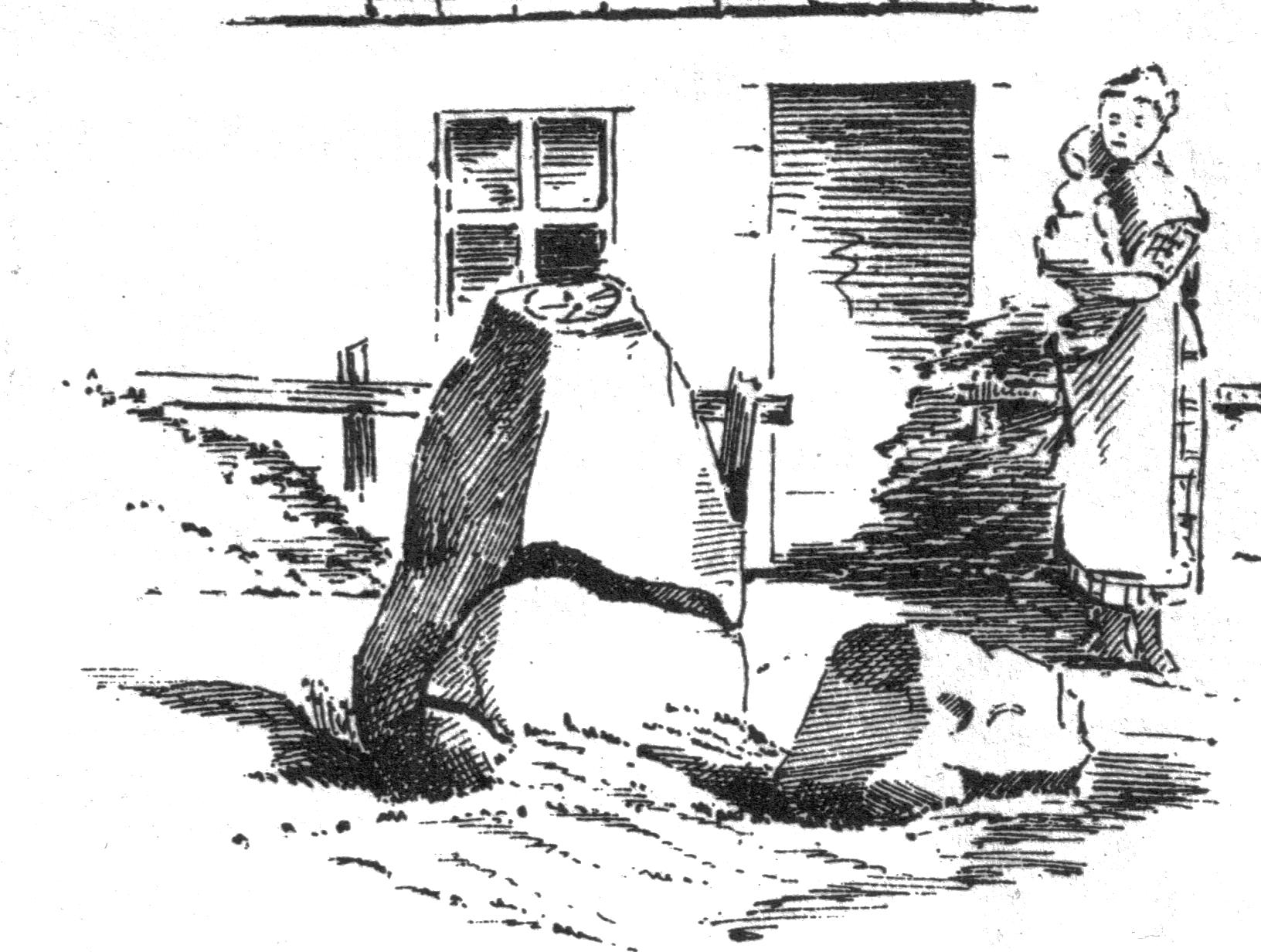
The Minnigaff loupin-on stone

- In Minnigaff, Dumfries & Galloway, a louping-on is illustrated by MacGibbon & Ross as standing next to a market cross which bore a sun-dial.
- At Walton-on-the-Hill in Lancashire the old church font was set up as a mounting stone outside the nearby public house.
- At Chollerton in Northumberland a fine example stands by the churchyard gate.
- At Nevern church in Wales the church of Saint Brynach has a wall based mounting wall.
- Marnock Old Kirk (Aberdeenshire) has a loupin-on stane just outside the kirkyard wall and probably dates from around 1780.
- The poet Walt Whitman's house in Camden, New Jersey (USA) has a stone mounting block near the curb. It is engraved with the initials "W.W."

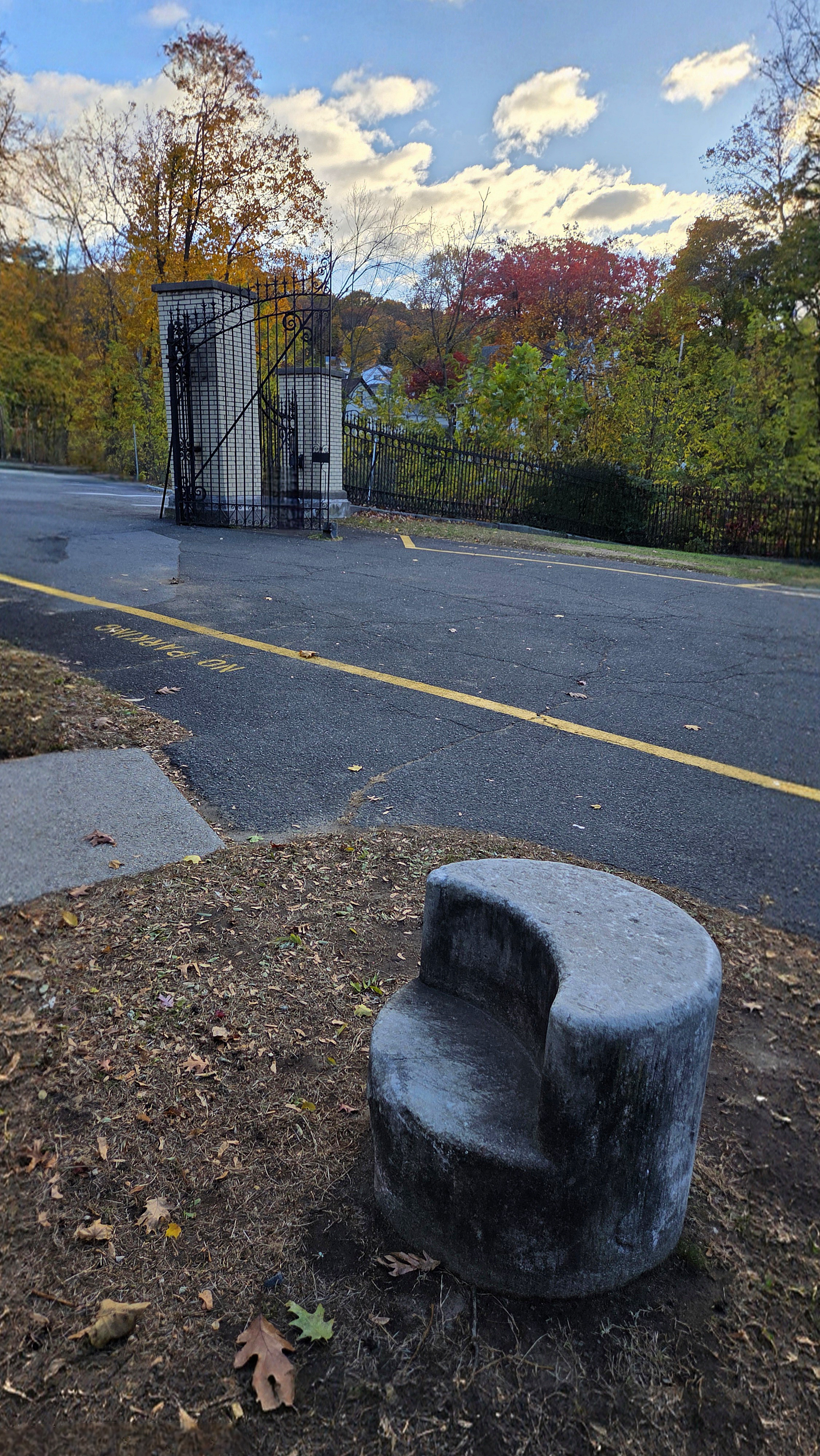
A mounting block outside the South Gate of the Sleepy Hollow Cemetery in the village of Sleepy Hollow, New York (USA).
