= Queen's Nursing Institute Scotland =

The Queen's Nursing Institute Scotland (QNIS) is a charity which promotes high quality community nursing. Based in Edinburgh, the body was founded in 1889 with the opening of the small Central Training Home at North Charlotte Street. Due to the high demand for training for district nurses, the QNIS soon moved (in 1890) to the grand premises at Castle Street, where it remains.

== History ==
Following the work of William Rathbone in Liverpool in 1859, district nursing developed a similar approach in Scotland. The Glasgow Sick Poor and Private Nursing Association was founded by Mrs Mary Orrell Higginbotham in 1875. Higginbotham was the wife of a Glasgow merchant. She undertook an apprenticeship in the Glasgow Western Infirmary and Miss McAlpin's Nursing Home. At the end of the first year of operation of The Glasgow Sick Poor and Private Nursing Association only one district nurse had been employed, who treated 100 cases in their homes. In the seven years prior to Higginbotham’s death 15,000 cases had been cared for. In 1887 Queen Victoria used her golden jubilee to gift £70,000 for the creation of the Queen Victoria Jubilee Institute for Nurses. This funding was for educating nurses on how to care for people in their own homes with funds allocated to London, Edinburgh and Dublin branches. The Glasgow Sick Poor and Private Nursing Association became the Glasgow training centre for Queen’s Nurses in 1889. By 1891, 12 local associations affiliated to the Queen's Institute. In the year 1900 there were 199 Queen’s Nurses in Scotland working under 111 Associations. Miss Guthrie Wright was the first secretary of the QNIS.

== Queen's nurse award ==
The original title Queen's Nurse was reintroduced in 2017, to be awarded to leaders in clinical excellence in the fields of community-based, registered nursing, midwifery and health visiting.

The founding charter states the goal of the organisation, still applicable today:

"The training support and maintenance of women to act as nurses for the sick poor and the establishment (if thought proper) of a home or homes for nurses and generally the promotion and provision of improved means of nursing the sick poor."

== See also ==
- NHS Scotland
- Scotland's Gardens
