= Glasgow District Nursing Association =

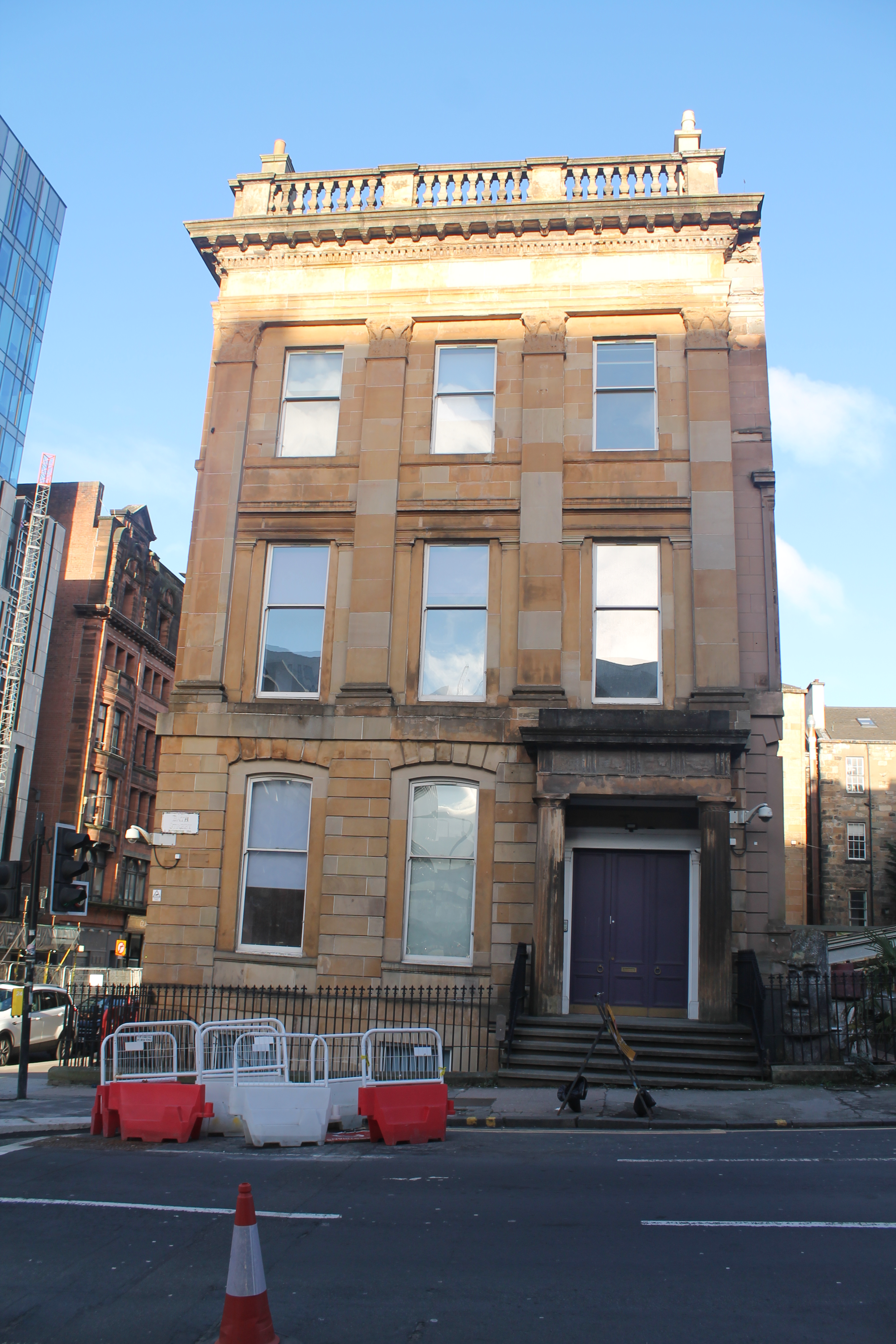
Original Association building in Bath Street

The Glasgow Sick Poor and Private Nursing Association, was founded in 1875 by Mary Orrell Higginbotham. It became known as the Higginbotham Sick Poor Nursing Association and then the Glasgow District Nursing Association. It became the Glasgow training centre for Queen's Nurses in 1889. This then became the Queens Nursing Institute Scotland.

== History ==
The Glasgow Sick Poor and Private Nursing Association was founded by Mary Orrell Higginbotham in 1875. While a number of English cities in the 1860s began to build on the model of district nursing established by William Rathbone in Liverpool in 1859, this was the first in Scotland. In 1875 Dr. J. B. Russell, Medical officer for Health, had written enthusiastically of the Liverpool district nursing scheme and by 1880 he was on the executive of the Glasgow Sick Poor and Private Nursing Association.

The purpose of the Association was to provide trained and experienced nurses to attend the sick poor in their own homes. It was a charity but also funded by providing a service to other citizens who could afford to pay for private nursing.

The objects for which the Association was established were:

(1) To provide trained nurses to attend (a) the sick poor, gratuitously or otherwise; (b) sick persons who are able to pay for their services.

(2) To provide, if it is thought advisable, the sick poor with food, medicine, surgical appliances, clothing, bedding or change of residence, either gratuitously or otherwise.

(3) To provide, administer, and if thought expedient, subscribe to a Fund for behoof of the nurses of the Association.

(4) To provide and maintain premises for the resident officials, the servants of the Institution and the nurses, and for other purposes.

(5) To make and carry into effect arrangements with respect to the affiliation, union of interests, cooperation, or amalgamation of the Association, either in whole or in part, with any Association or person having objects similar to, or kindred with, any of the objects of the Association.

(6) To subscribe money to, or otherwise assist, associations or persons having objects similar to any of the objects of the Association.

(7) To do all such other lawful things as may be deemed incidental or conducive to the encouragement or attainment of the above objects or any one of them.

A subsequent similar organisation in Glasgow was the Roman Catholic St. Elizabeth Home for District and Private Nursing founded in 1883. Higginbotham, in a dog cart, went into the poor areas in Glasgow, starting in Anderston and Finnieston. This was the start of district nursing in Scotland's cities. The Association hired private nurses who provided care for those who could afford to pay fees. These fees were then used to subsidise the work carried out by nurses in the poorer areas of the city where people could not afford to pay for nursing care. At the end of the first year Higginbotham reported that only one district nurse had been employed, and 100 cases treated.

By 1877 the districts of Cowcaddens and an area on the south side, were added. Two years later there were five of the Association's district nurses and two midwifery sisters working in Glasgow and by 1885 there were ten district nurses, six midwives, and fifteen untrained nursing assistants who acted as night nurses when these were required. The district nursing work continued to expand, although in 1889 it was decided that the midwifery work should be discontinued as the Maternity Hospital was extending its domiciliary work at this time and funding of the Association was overextended.

Nurses who worked for the Association were required to have completed three years of general hospital training. The staff included nurses who had training in medical, surgical, fever and midwifery. The nurses were also required to show evidence of satisfactory character, education, health and physical fitness. Nurses were given one day off a month. Nurses were provided with accommodation, although as the number of districts expanded to areas further from the nurses home in Bath St, local committees like the Maryhill District Nursing Association paid the cost of the board and lodging of the nurses while the Higginbotham Sick Poor Association provided their salaries and uniform. The nurses were provided with the medical and surgical equipment necessary for their work; where required patients could be supplied with water pillows, air beds, mackintosh sheets etc. The nurses also distributed flannels and warm clothing and provided invalid food like beef tea, milk, and stimulants (alcohol) to those with chronic complaints.

The institution continued to grow and in turn public support gradually increased. Private trained nurses were maintained for the sake of the revenue to the institution, and in 1889 1,727 poor cases were taken over by 14 trained nurses and 9 assistant nurses, and, from 1882 to 1889, a total of 15,000 cases were cared for by the Association. In 1892-3 the number of patients treated was 1,555. By December 1893 61,363 home visits were made.

In 1894 one of the district nurses of Mrs. Higginbotham's Glasgow Sick Poor and Private Nursing Association was appointed to help in the Anderson's College and the Glasgow Central Dispensary for a few hours each day. The most common conditions treated by the district nurses were chronic conditions such as consumption, cancer, ulcers, abscesses, and paralysis. These were conditions for which there was no effective treatment at this time.

In 1926 the annual report stated that there were 51 district nurses engaged by the Association in Glasgow. During the year 1925-26 these nurses attended 6,180 patients, including cases of acute illness, nursing of mothers and infants, attendance at operations, continuous care of bed-ridden patients and " following-up work" at the request of infirmaries and hospitals.

The Higginbotham Sick Poor Nursing Association incorporated Glasgow Old Man's Friendly Society and Old Woman's Home.

218 Bath St was bought by the Glasgow Sick Poor and Nursing Association 24 April 1891. It was transferred to Glasgow City Council in 1977 for £23,000.

== Notable staff ==
Higginbotham, born in England, was the wife of a Glasgow merchant, James Higginbotham. He was a partner in the Glasgow firm of Messrs. C. Todd & Higginbotham, Sons and Co., merchants and calico-printers. Higginbotham moved to Glasgow in the early 1870s and persuaded her husband to consent to her training as a nurse at the Western Infirmary Glasgow. On qualifying she first worked at Miss McAlpin's Glasgow Training Home for Nurses. She was most interested in caring for the sick poor and so she soon left to found the Association for Providing Trained Nurses for the West of Scotland. Higginbotham died on 12 December 1889 at the age of 41 and was buried in Derbyshire. Higginbotham's work continued after her death with the institution she founded obtaining too firm a hold on public opinion, with the benefits too widely recognised for its security and prosperity to be in any doubt.

Miss Morrison worked as a senior assistant at the home until she left to take up the position of Durham Assistant County Superintendent. In 1918, 14 nurses were absent doing military nursing. The Association staff were also noted to have been busy during the influenza epidemic. Nurse Ferguson was one of the Queen's nurses who served in France under the Civil Hospital reserve during World War 1. She was awarded the Royal Red Cross. Nurse Barnet also worked as a nurse at the home and was part of the war effort under the Joint War Committee. When home on leave Nurses Ferguson and Barnet received gifts from the Association to take back to wounded soldiers in their charge including sweets and cigarettes.

Anna Dalglish Reid, a close friend of Higginbotham, was involved in the establishment of the Higginbotham home. Reid was also appointed vice-president of the Queen's Institute of District Nursing in Scotland in 1928. She was associated with the Royal Hospital for Sick Children, Glasgow. Reid was a member of the Scottish Council for 21 years having represented the Glasgow District Nursing Association for 17 years prior to her appointment as vice-president of the Scottish branch. Following her death she left £500 to the Glasgow District Nursing Association and £500 to the Royal Hospital for Sick Children, Glasgow.
