= Kilcoy Castle =

Castle in Highland, Scotland

Coordinates: 57°31′44″N 4°22′44″W

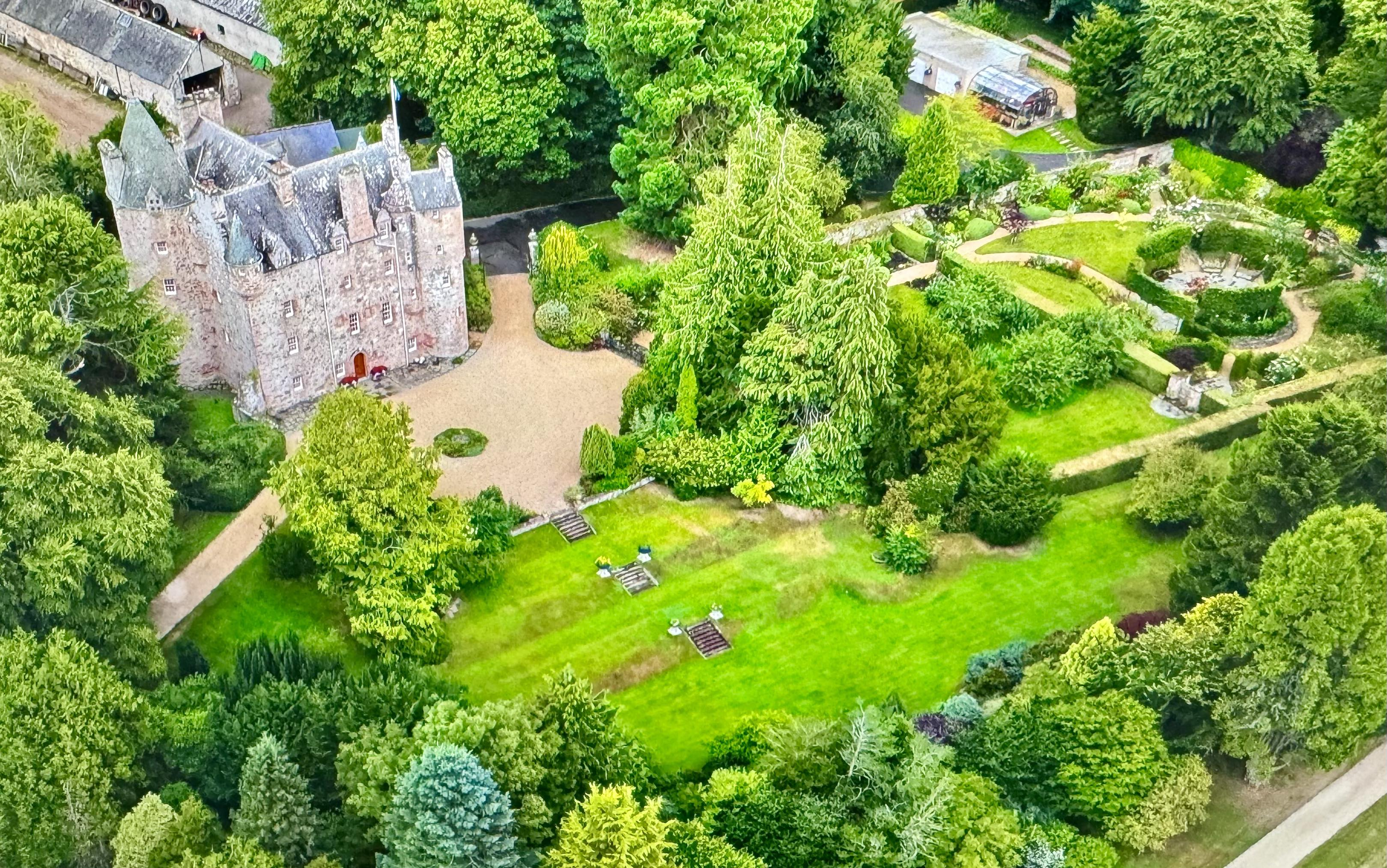
Kilcoy Castle and Gardens

Kilcoy Castle is a 16th-century castle near Muir of Ord and Tore on the Black Isle, in Ross and Cromarty, Scotland. Kilcoy Castle is a ‘Z’ plan fortalice dating from no later than 1618 and possibly founded as early as 1580 (contemporary with Dalcross Castle QV).

== History ==
The castle was built beginning as early as 1580 by the Stewart family, and completed by Alexander Mackenzie, third son of Colin Cam Mackenzie of Kintail around 1618. As a result of his marriage (contract 15 August 1611) to the widow of Sir James Stewart of Kilcoy, he had a charter of the lands of Kilcoy dated 18 July 1616 and a further charter of the Barony of Kilcoy dated 29 January 1618. The estates passed through the male line of the Mackenzies of Kilcoy until the death in 1883 of Sir Evan Mackenzie, 2nd Baronet, when they were inherited by his eldest daughter, who married a Colonel Burton.

It fell into a ruinous state during the late 18th and 19th Centuries and was restored in 1891 by the Inverness Architects Ross and McBeth, who added a four-storey wing to the north.

The castle was restored from a ruinous condition in about 1891.

== Construction ==
The castle is a Z-plan tower house. It has five storeys with two round corner towers. The slated roof has crow-stepped gables and (probably late 17th century) dormer-head windows. There are many gun loops.

== Present day ==
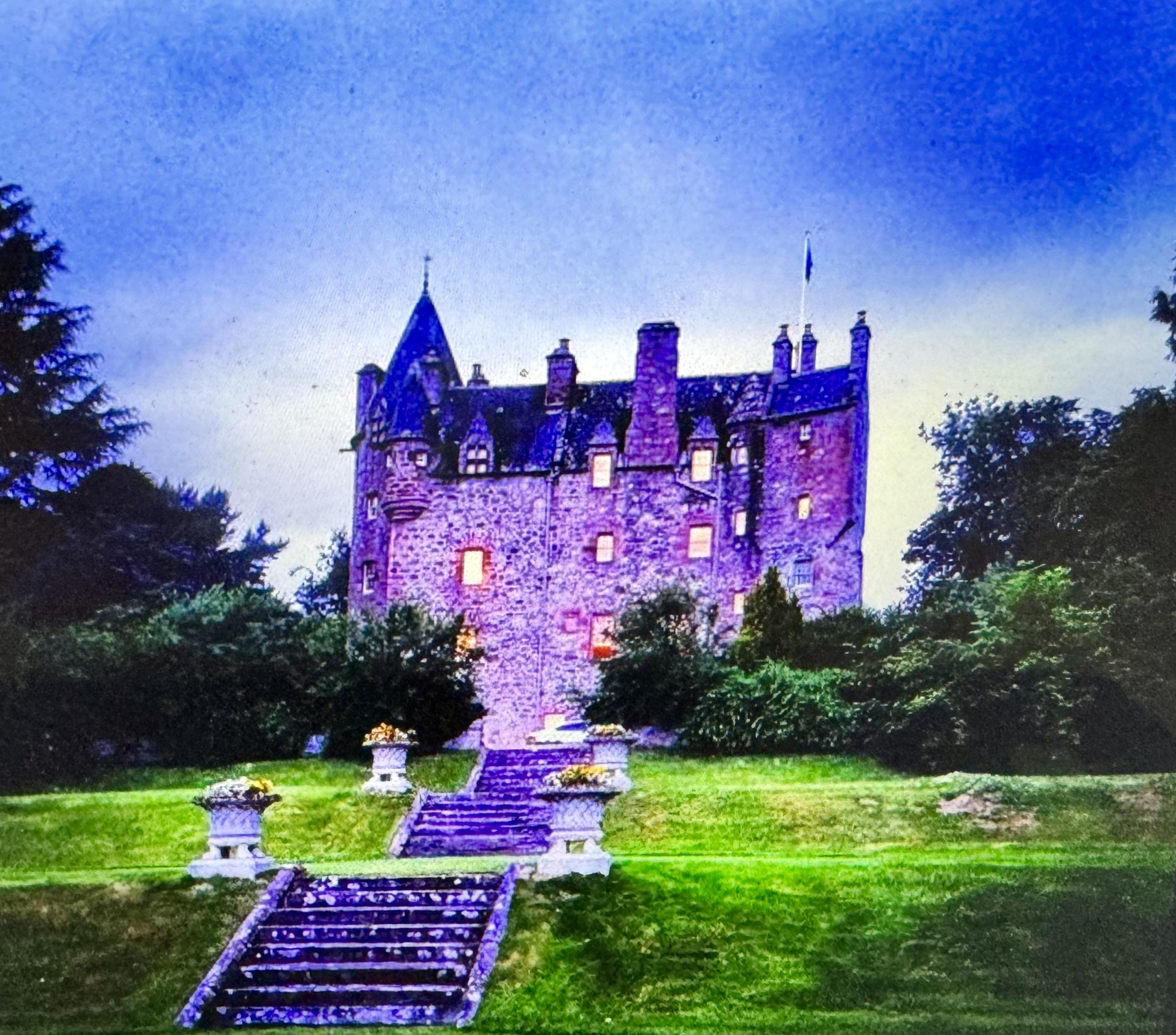
Kilcoy Castle at dusk

The castle is owned by relations of the original Stewart builders of Kilcoy. Its gardens are periodically open to the public under Scotland’s Gardens Scheme. The Menkings of Kilcoy maintain the Castle as their official residence but are rarely in residence. The castle is used primarily for evangelical and charitable purposes and regularly hosts events for a variety of Christian and local charities. Mark Menking of Kilcoy, the current Baron of Kilcoy is heir to the Lordship of the Garioch (in Aberdeenshire) currently held by George David Menking of Garioch. The Garioch Charitable Trust holds its annual trustee meetings at the castle.
