= Granton Garden =

Coordinates: 55.978°N 3.2316°W

The Granton Garden is an organic wildlife garden in the Granton area of Edinburgh, at the home of the musician and gardener Fraser Drummond. There are over 200 species in one small walled garden. Drummond has recorded 29 bird species in the garden as well as fox, hedgehog, squirrel and a colony of frogs.

It has appeared in the BBC television programme The Beechgrove Garden and in The Scotsman. and has regularly been open to the public as part of Scotland's Garden Scheme.

== Areas ==
The garden is 90 feet by 40 feet and divided into three areas: woodland, rockery and evergreen. The woodland area includes six varieties of Fritillaria, twelve varieties of Primula and Erythronium 'Pagoda'. The rockery has ponds, a greenhouse and numerous unusual species, e.g. Vestia, Actinidia kolomikta and Ribes speciosum. The evergreen area has Polyanthus and lily flowered tulips.

== Views of the garden ==
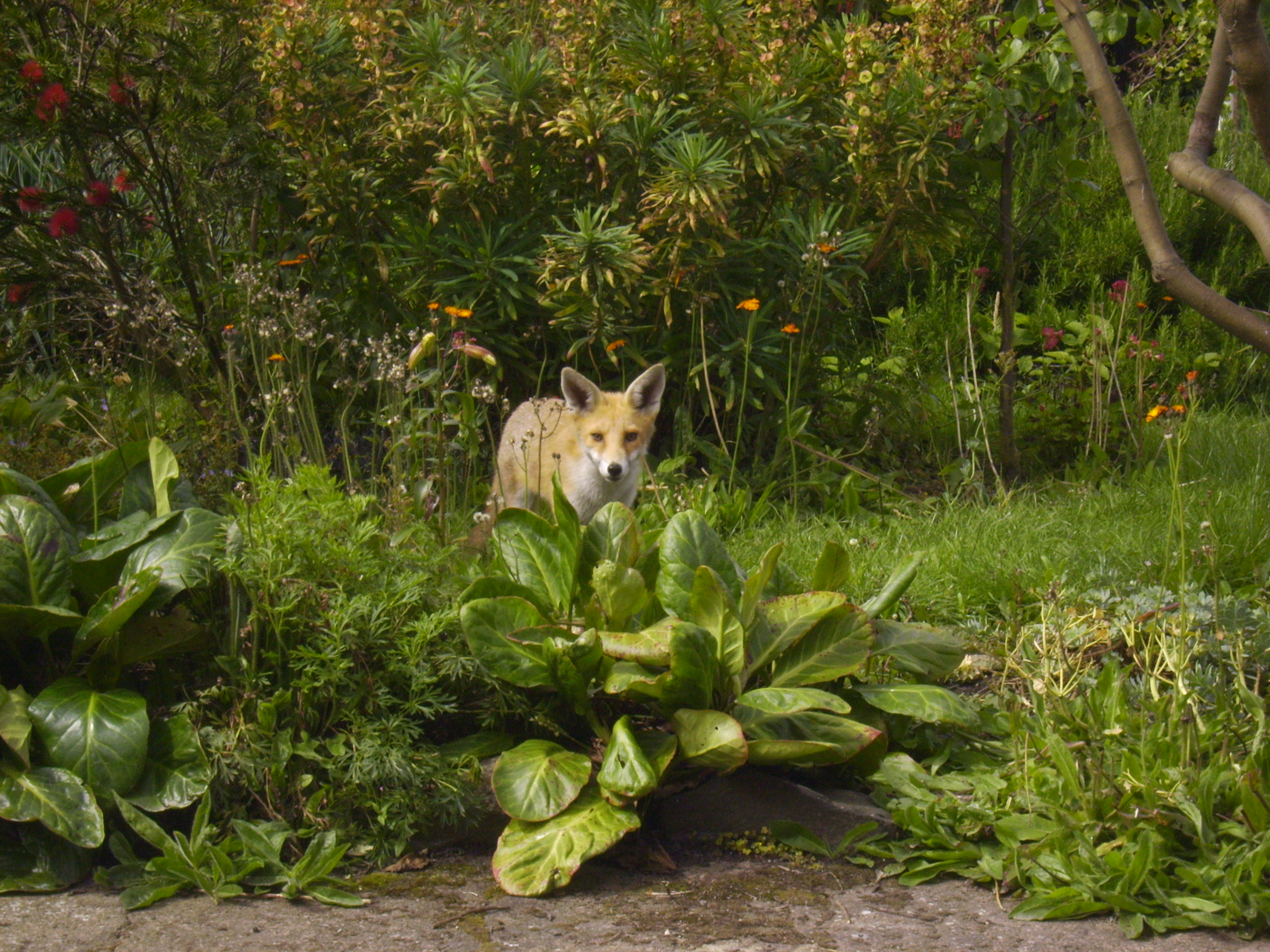
Wild fox in the Granton Garden, February 2006

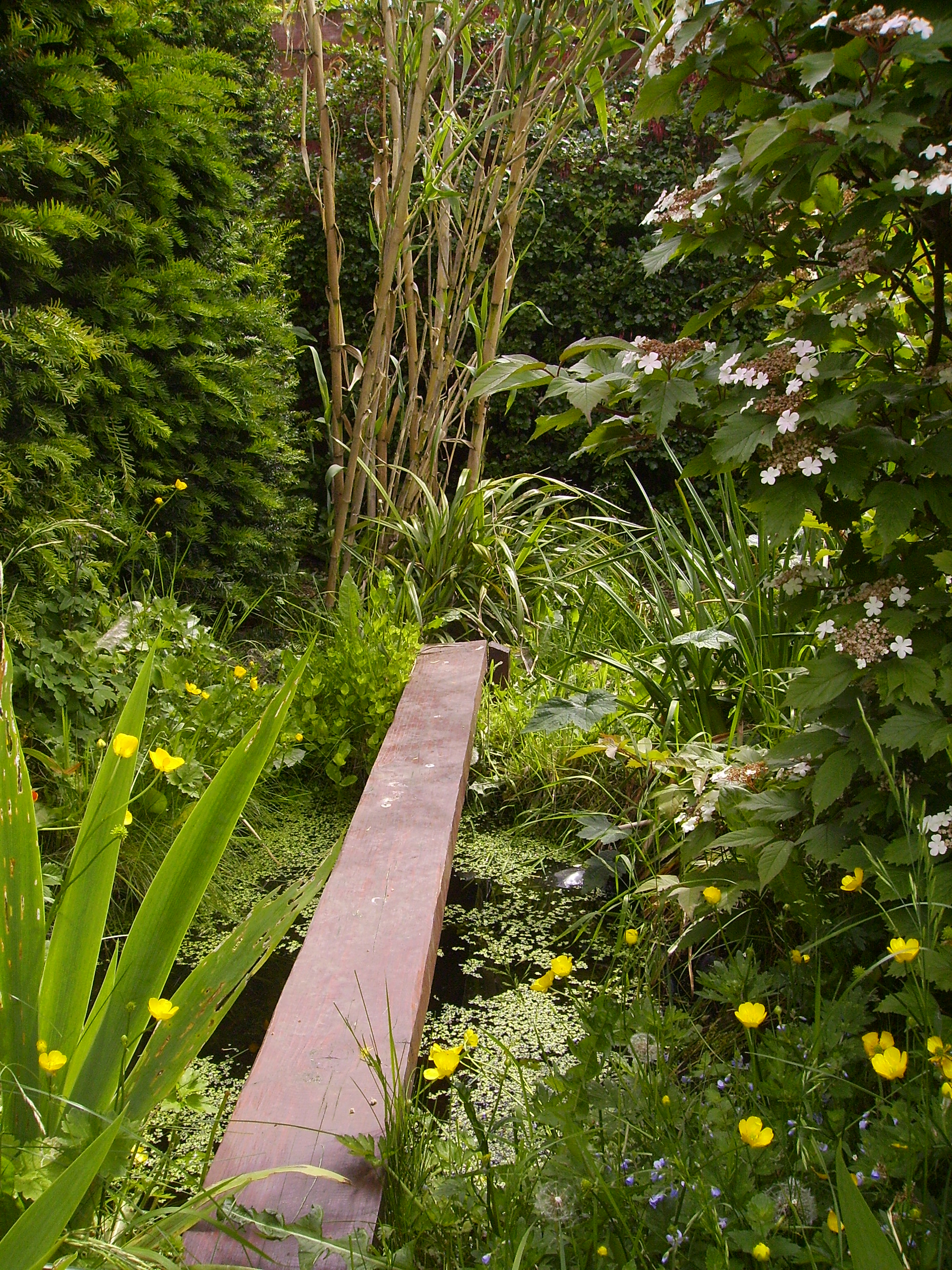
Pond in the Garden, April 2012

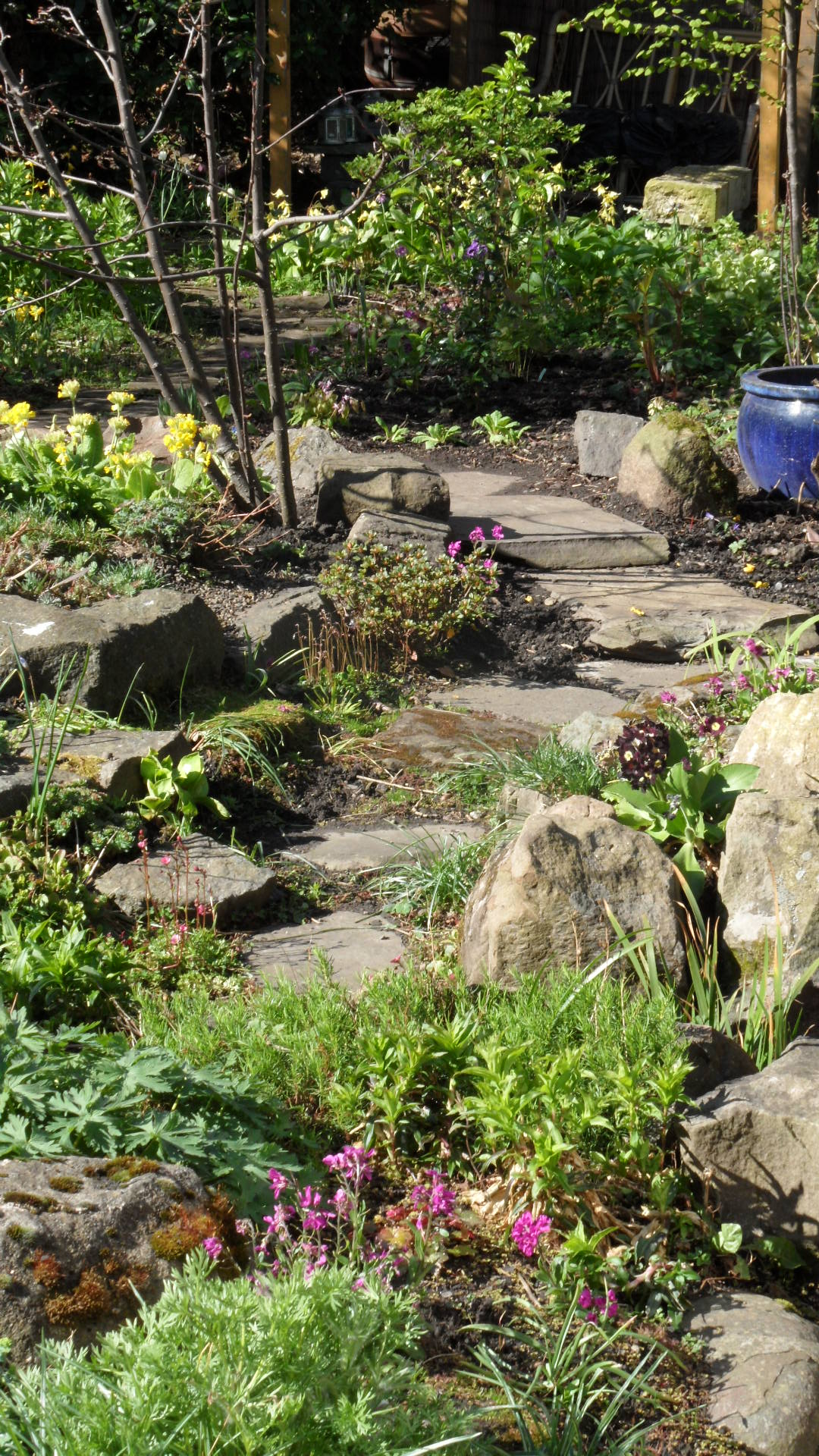
Rockery, April 2012

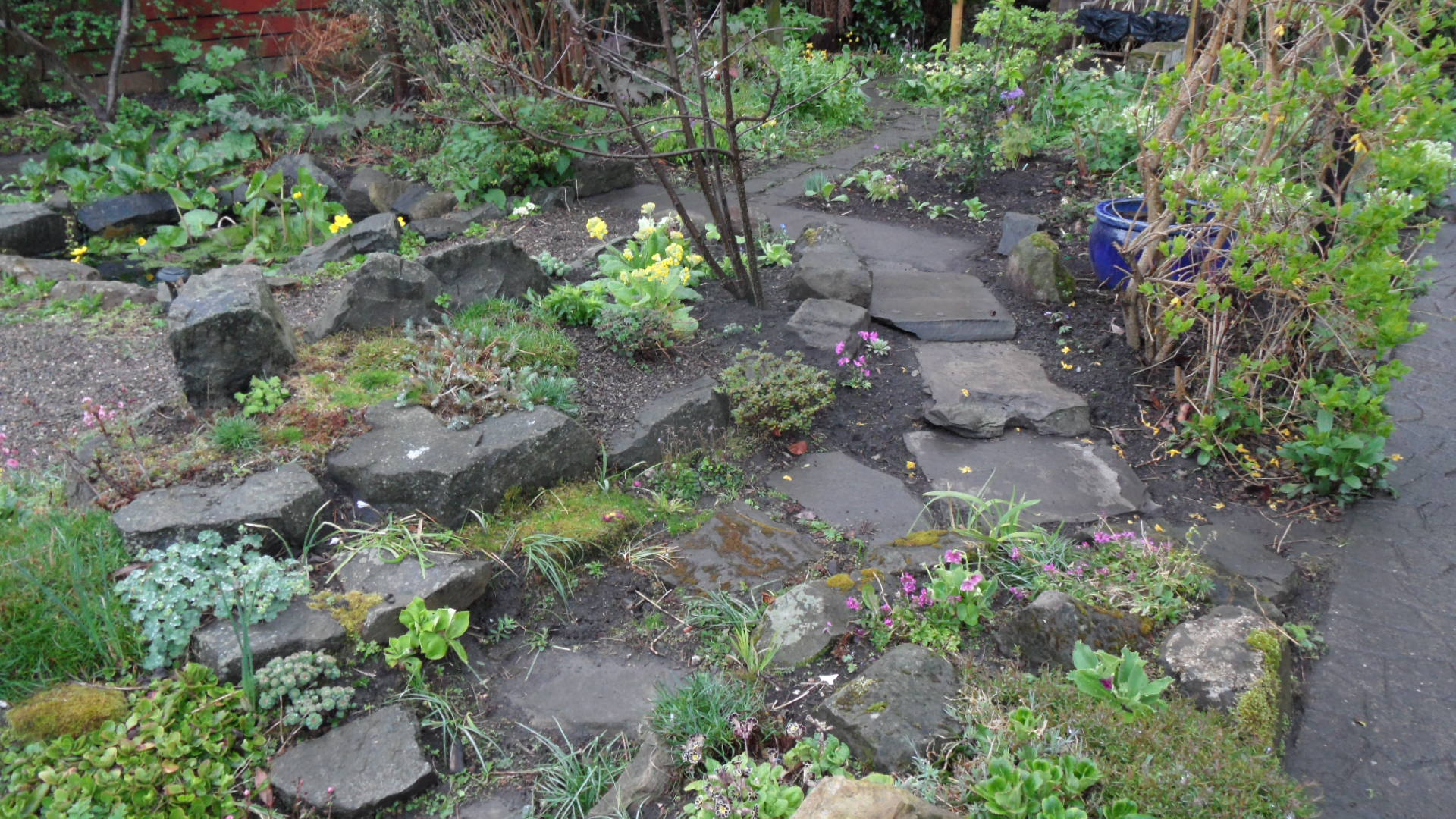
Rockery, April 2012

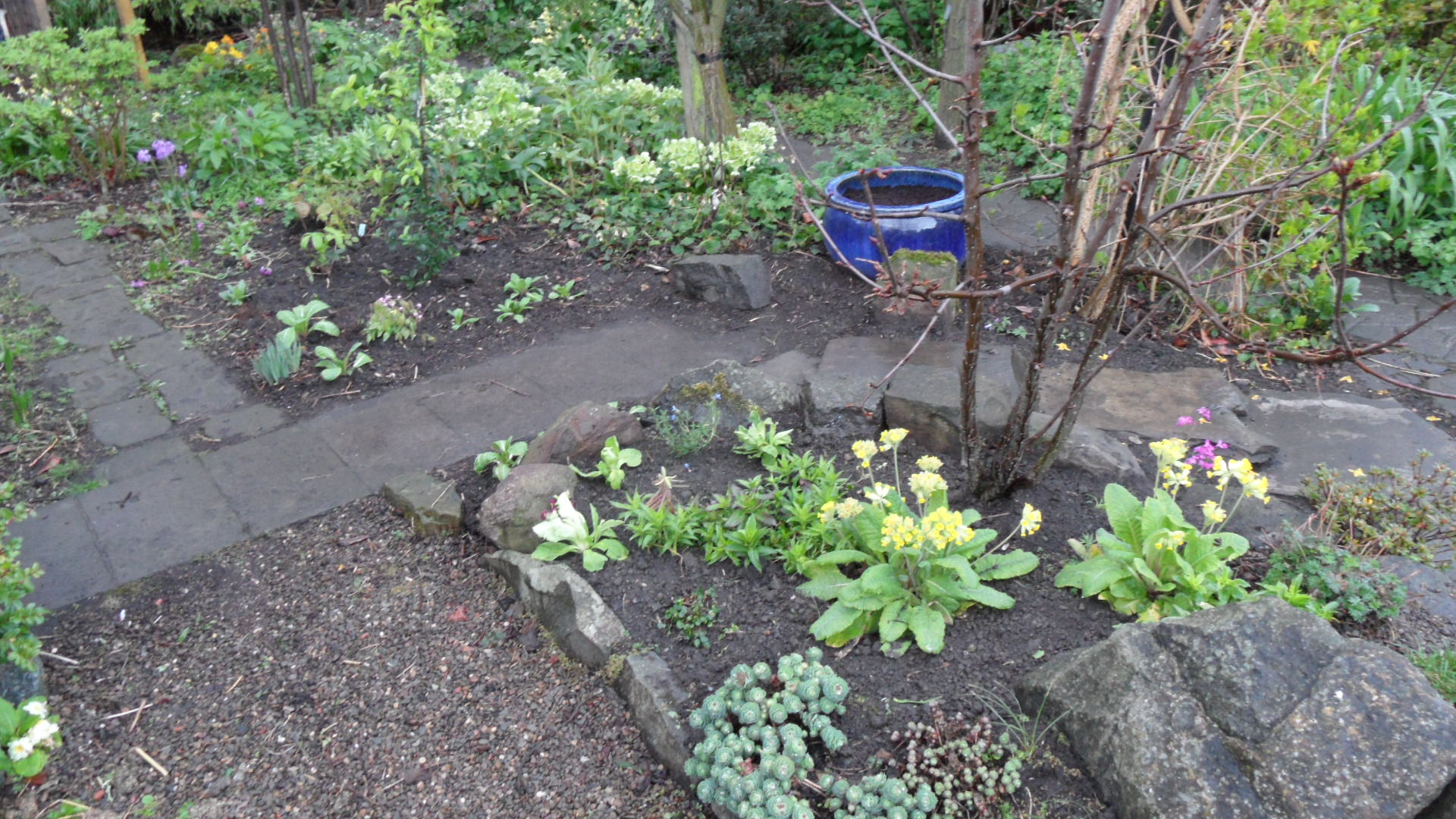
Rockery, April 2012

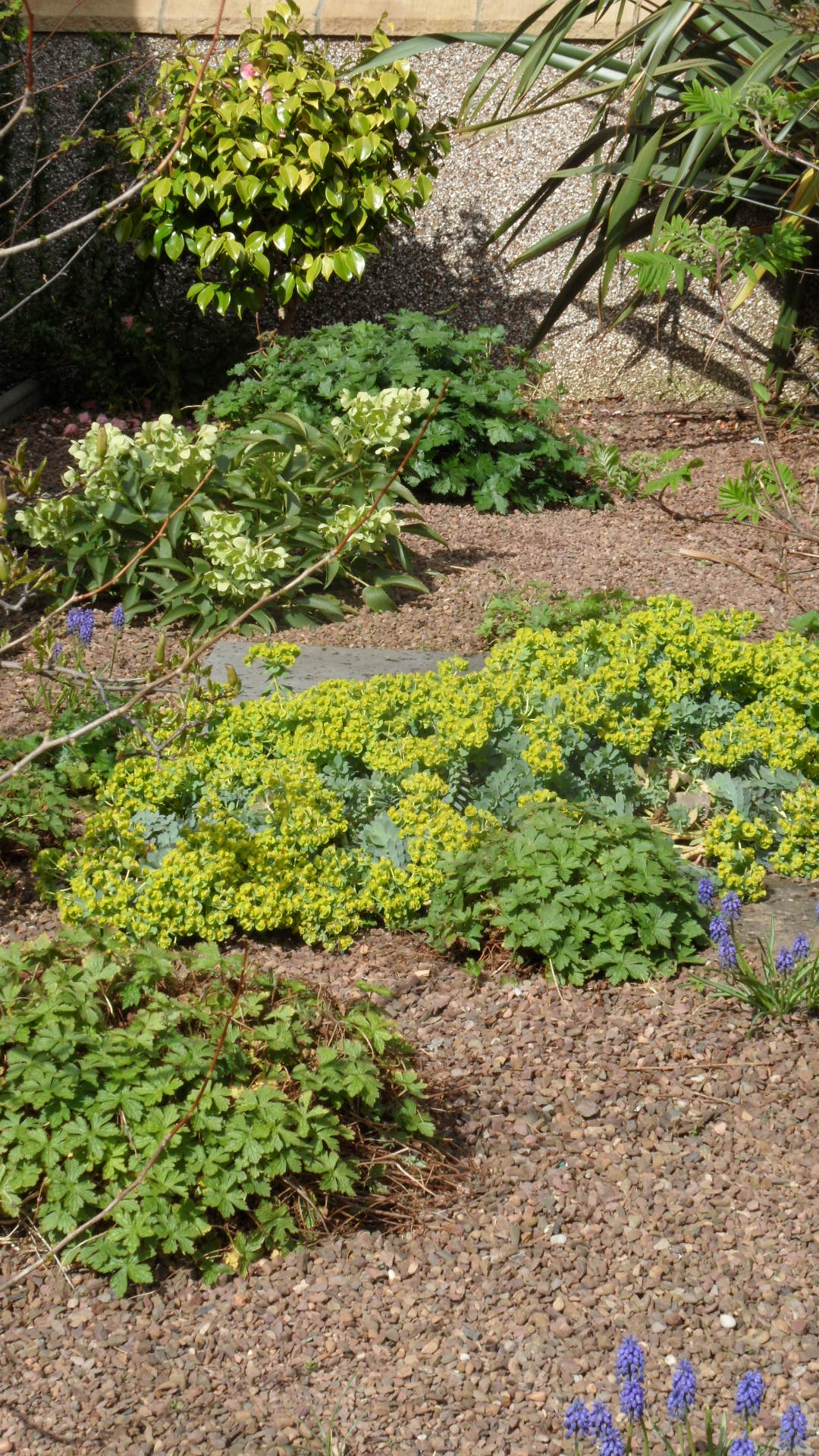
Front Garden April 2012

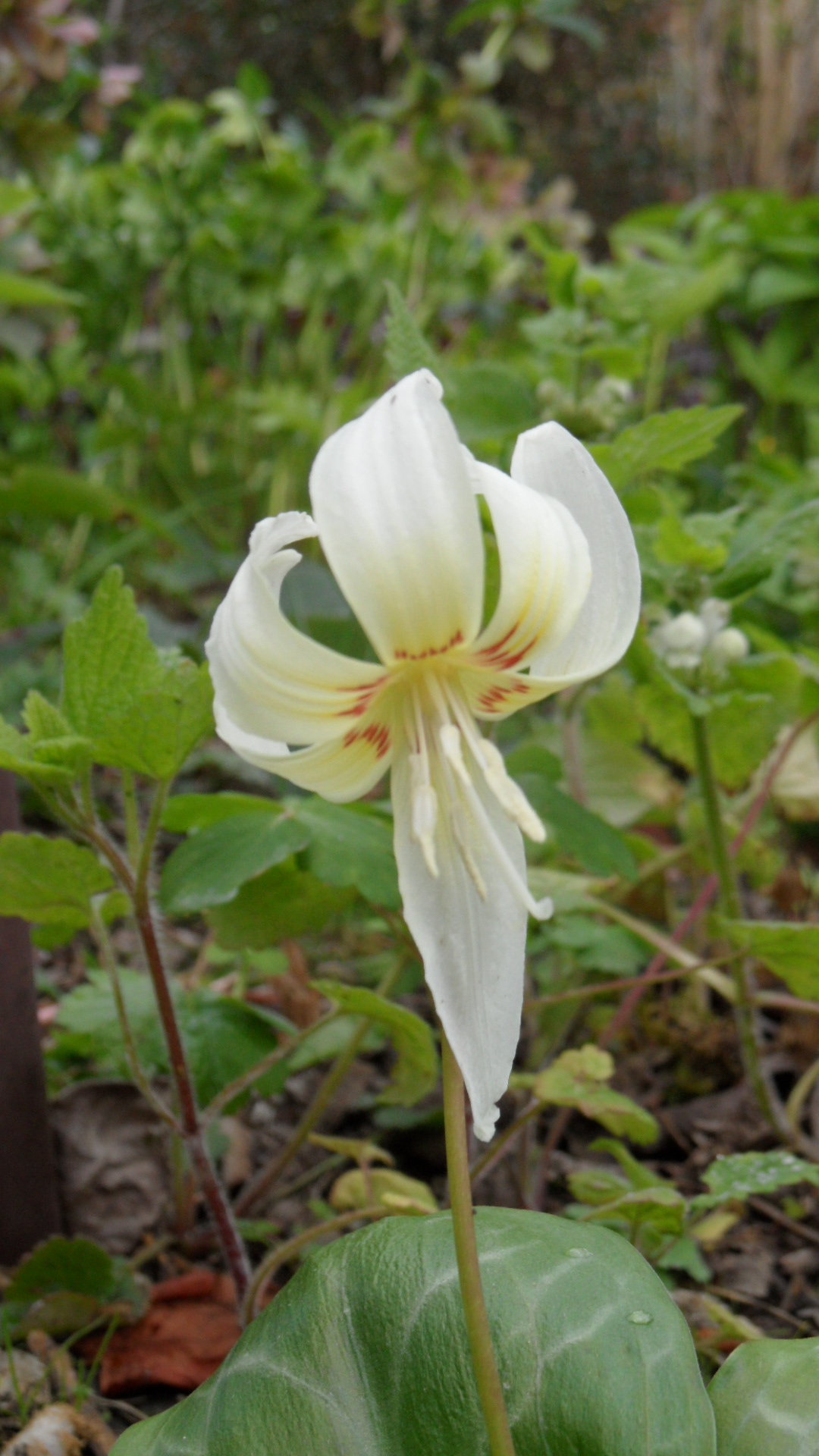
Erythronium revolutum "White Beauty"

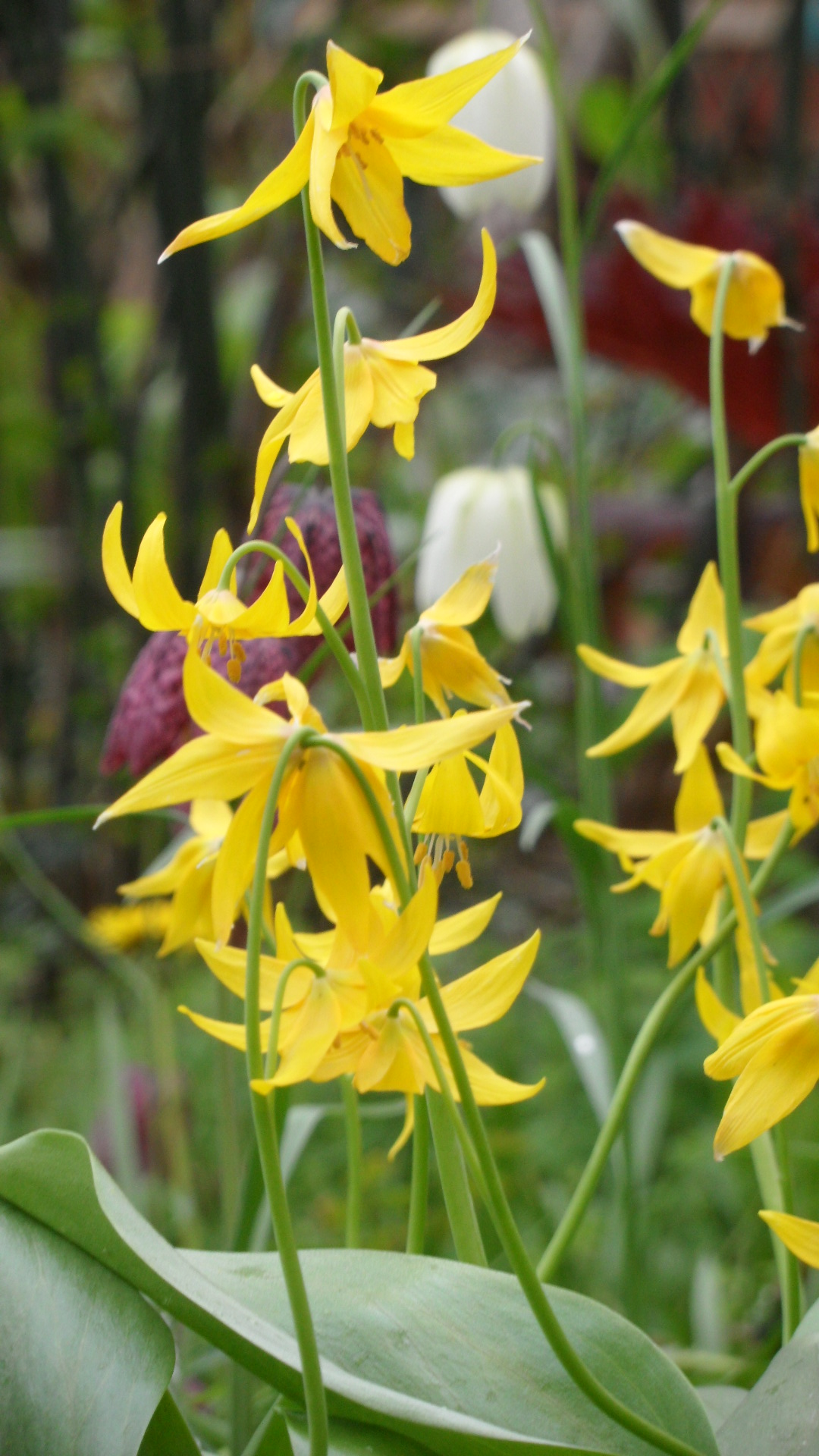
Erythronium "Pagoda"

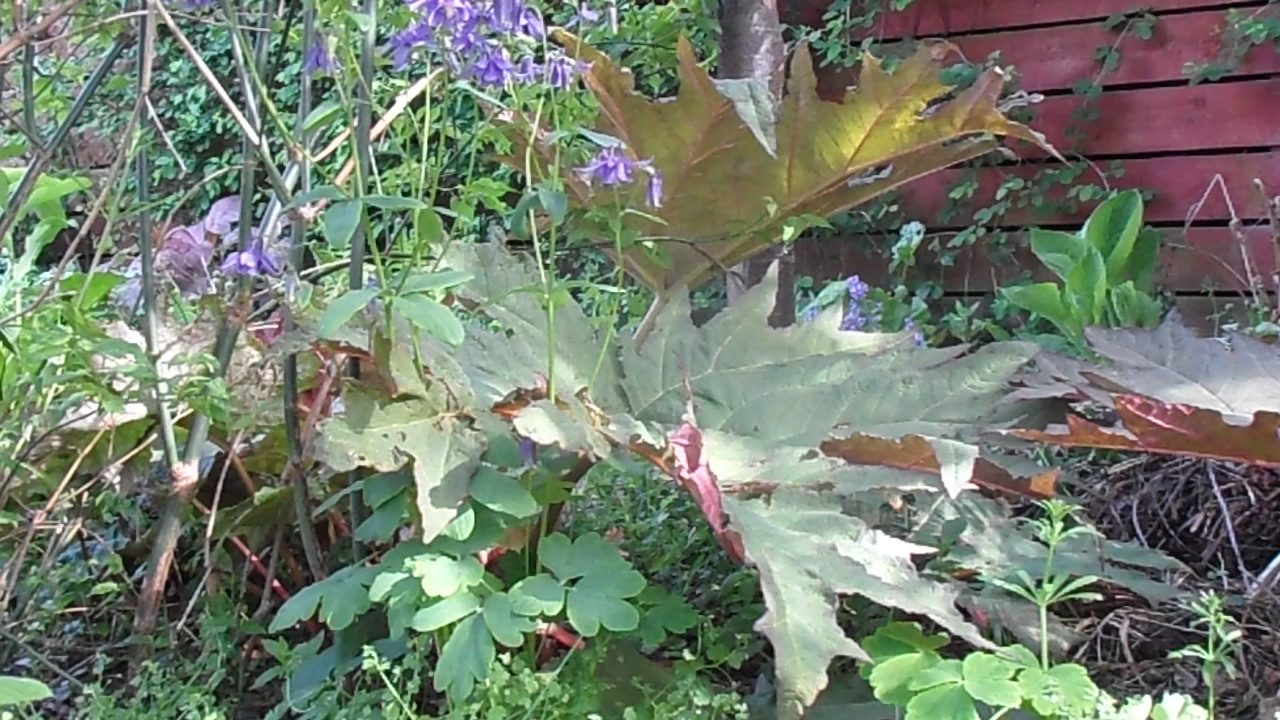
Rheum Palmatum
