= Arthur Forman Balfour Paul =

Scottish architect

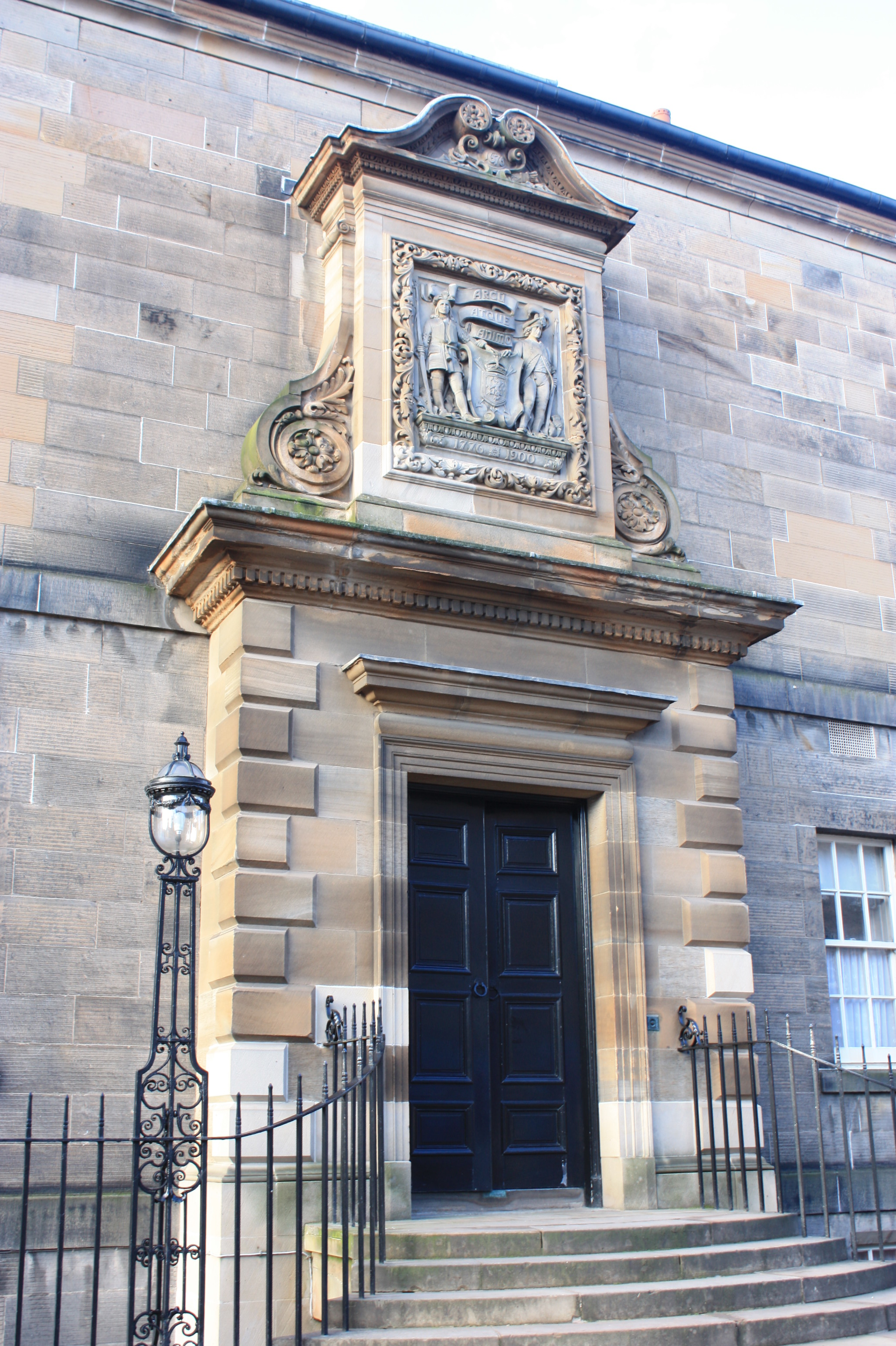
Entrance to Archer's Hall, Edinburgh, by A F Balfour Paul

Arthur Forman Balfour Paul (7 August 1875 – 3 June 1938) (affectionately known as "Baffy" Paul) was a Scottish architect operating largely in the early 20th century.

== Life ==
He was born in Edinburgh on 7 August 1875, the son of Sir James Balfour Paul, Lord Lyon King of Arms, an important role in aristocratic Scotland, and his wife. He was a second cousin to Robert Louis Stevenson.

He was educated at Edinburgh Academy from 1885 to 1892, then articled (apprenticed) to Sir Robert Rowand Anderson until 1896. He then studied at the School of Applied Art, the forerunner of Edinburgh College of Art under Frank Worthington Simon and Stewart Henbest Capper.

In 1895 he travelled in Belgium and the Netherlands and in 1897 made a three-month tour of England.

In 1898 he obtained a position in John Belcher's office in London and studied further at the LCC School of Art. During this period he joined the London Scottish Regiment as a piper. In 1903 he returned to Edinburgh to be Robert Rowand Anderson's partner.

In 1905 he married Jane Prichard Montgomerie-Fleming.

Partly due to this military background, he joined as an officer during the First World War, serving as a major in the Royal Engineers. He distinguished himself, being award both the Military Cross and Croix de Guerre with Gold Star.

In 1919 he returned to Robert Rowand Anderson, becoming sole partner due to Anderson's retirement on grounds of ill-health.

In 1931 Basil Spence and William Kininmonth were employed by him, sharing a role as a draughtsman in his office, receiving only one salary between them, but in 1934 both were elevated to partner status, creating Kininmonth, Spence and Paul.

Paul died at his home, Peffermill House in Edinburgh, on 3 June 1938.

== Works under Anderson & Paul ==
- Science block, Dollar Academy (1910)
- Sanatorium, Fettes College (1911)
- Dining Hall, Edinburgh Academy (1911)
- St George's School for Girls, Upper Coltbridge Terrace, Edinburgh (1912)
- McNeill House, 7 Kinellan Road, Edinburgh (1913)

== Works as Sole Partner ==
- Feuing of the Braid Estate in Edinburgh
- Feuing of the Fettes Trust lands (Comely Bank etc.) in Edinburgh
- Chemistry Building, University of Edinburgh, King's Buildings (1919)
- Loanhead War Memorial (1920)
- Scottish Rugby Union War Memorial, Murrayfield, Edinburgh (1920)
- Internal modernisation of Cakemuir Castle (1926)
- 22 Kinnear Road, edinburgh (1928)
- Kimmerghame House, Fettes College (2 Carrington Road) (1928)
- Church of Scotland, Chalmers Street, Edinburgh (1934, now demolished)
