= Scotland's Gardens =

Scottish horticultural charity

Garden open for charity as part of Scotland's Gardens, 2022

Scotland's Gardens is a horticultural charity established in 1931 and based in Edinburgh. It was founded to raise money for the Queen's Nursing Institute Scotland, to help support the Queen's Nurses, before the creation of the National Health Service. It now raises money for other charities by opening otherwise private gardens throughout the country to the general public. The criteria to have your garden listed in the "Yellow Book" are tough, and it is considered a challenge to achieve a listing.

40% of the funds raised are given to charities selected by the owners of the gardens. Over 200 charities benefit every year. The other 60% of funds are given to four charities selected by Scotland's Gardens:

- Queen's Nursing Institute Scotland
- the Gardens Fund of the National Trust for Scotland
- Maggie's Cancer Caring Centres
- Perennial

== Event ==
In addition to the gardens listed in its "Yellow Book" the charity also promotes several larger annual events, for example:

- Orkney Garden Festival
- Rhododendron Festival
- Scottish Snowdrop Festival

== Participating gardens ==
Some of the more noted listed gardens include:

- Carolside, Borders
- Garden of Cosmic Speculation, near Dumfries
- Granton Garden, Edinburgh
- Kailzie Gardens, Borders
- Kildrummy Castle, Aberdeenshire
- Dean Gardens, Edinburgh
- Cakemuir Castle
- Kilcoy Castle, the Black Isle
- Kincardine Castle, Royal Deeside
- Ross Priory, West Dunbartonshire
- Row House, Stirling
- Yair House, Borders
- Scottish Dark Sky Observatory, near Dalmellington

=== Prior gardens ===
- Dawyck, Stobo
- Broughton Place, Broughton
- Cardrona House, by Innerleithen
- The Kirna, Walkerburn
- Arniston, Gorebridge
- Dundas Castle, South Queensferry
- Halmyre, West Linton
- Springmount, Peebles

== See also ==
- Gardening in Scotland
- National Gardens Scheme, a similar organisation in England, Northern Ireland, Wales and The Channel Islands.
