= Cakemuir Castle =

Historic house in Midlothian, Scotland

Coordinates: 55.8217°N 2.9403°W

Cakemuir Castle is an historic house situated 4 miles (6.4 km) southeast of Pathhead, in the Lammermuir Hills, Midlothian, Scotland. The name may be connected with the provision of shelter and hospitality to pilgrims on their way to Melrose Abbey. The castle remains a private house, and is protected as a category B listed building.

Cakemuir Castle is a mid-16th-century tower, built on the site of an earlier structure, named Black Castle. It is oblong on plan and four storeys high with a parapet walk and garret above. The parapet contains two covered recesses for guards. A series of gun-loops on the fourth floor, now built up, is the only provision for defence.

The projecting turnpike-stair tower is round and capped with a square watch chamber. This feature is common to Tolquhon Castle and Crossraguel Abbey, and may symbolise Protestant sympathy. In the 18th century, the tower was extended by the Wauchope family to the south west and at the end of the 19th century, it was converted to a Baronial style house. It was again modernised in 1926 by Rowand Anderson, Paul & Partners, and later restored by Neil & Hurd around 1952. An ogee-roofed pavilion has recently been added to accommodate a dining room and ancillary rooms.

The panelled Hall, known as Queen Mary's room, commemorates Mary, Queen of Scots, who, dressed as a page, met up with Bothwell in Cakemuir Castle after fleeing from Borthwick Castle in June 1567. From Cakemuir, she travelled on to Dunbar.

An heraldic shield bearing the Wauchope arms on the east gable was once located above the original entrance. Adam Wauchope, 5th son of Gilbert Wauchope of Niddrie Marischal, built Cakemuir Castle around 1564. He was an advocate, and defended the Earl of Bothwell against the charge of murdering Lord Darnley. The castle was held by the Wauchops until 1794 when the then owner died.

The castle was internally modernised under the hand of the architect Arthur Forman Balfour Paul in 1926

Now owned by the Douglas-Miller family, the castle has a 2-acre (0.81 ha) walled garden featuring box hedging, rhododendrons and fruit trees. The gardens are occasionally opened to the public as part of Scotland's Gardens Scheme.
