= Ross Priory =

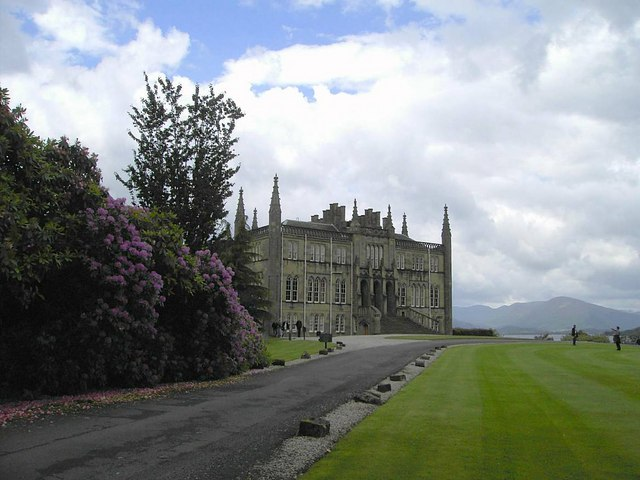
- Ross Priory

- Location in West Dunbartonshire
- 56.0546°N 4.5473°W

Listed Building – Category A
- Designated: 14 May 1971
- Reference no.: LB7625

Inventory of Gardens and Designed Landscapes in Scotland
- Official name: Ross Priory
- Designated: 1 July 1987
- Reference no.: GDL00329

Ross Priory is an early 19th-century country house located west of Gartocharn, West Dunbartonshire, on the south shore of Loch Lomond, Scotland. From the 14th century the estate, known as The Ross, was owned by a branch of the Buchanan family of Buchanan Castle, who built a house here in 1695. The present house is the result of remodelling by James Gillespie Graham and was complete in 1816. The term "priory" does not imply ecclesiastical provenance, but is simply a 19th-century romantic affectation. Sir Walter Scott spent time at Ross Priory in the years following the rebuilding. It was owned by subsequent members of the Leith-Buchanan family until the later 20th century. In 1971 it was sold to Strathclyde University and now serves as a recreational and conference centre.

Ross Priory is protected as a category A listed building, and the grounds are included on the Inventory of Gardens and Designed Landscapes in Scotland, the national listing of significant gardens.

== History ==
The history of Ross Priory began with the Buchanan Clan during the 11th century. A dwelling is known to have existed on the site from as early as 1693. It is reported that in 1745 the Buchanans were cursed by the Marquess of Tullibardine, who, in the aftermath of the Battle of Culloden asked James Leith-Buchanan, 5th of Ross, for shelter at the house but was instead betrayed and given over to King George's men. Tullibardine cursed them with the utterance:

"There will be Murrays on the Braes of Atholl land when there’s ne’er a Buchanan at the Ross.”

The Marquess's curse came to pass when, in 1925, the Leith-Buchanan's male line finally died out and the house was leased to Major George J.H. Christie, a veteran of World War I, remaining in the family's possession until shortly after the Major's death. Christie was responsible for the development and cultivation of the Priory's surrounding gardens. The Priory was sold to the University of Strathclyde in 1971, who refurbished the building and brought it into use as a university centre in 1973.

== Architecture ==
Ross Priory has been described as a Scottish Gothic style country house. It was designed in 1812 by Dunblane-born architect James Gillespie Graham (1776–1855) as an extensive remodelling of the site's existing farmhouse. Ross Priory comprises approximately 200 acres (80 hectares) of land and includes a formal garden, parkland, a burial ground and golf course.

== Famous visitors ==
Sir Walter Scott is said to have taken inspiration for his Waverley Novels from impressions formed during annual visits to the Priory. A room on the first floor is named for him.

== Current use ==
Ross Priory is now commonly used for meetings and entertainment by staff and graduates of Strathclyde University, as well as being a wedding venue. Its surrounding gardens, woodlands and parkland are open as part of Scotland's Gardens Scheme. There are 11 en suite bedrooms within the house, each of which are let on a bed & breakfast basis. Dinner is available by prior reservation. There is also a self-catering cottage on the loch shore which is let per week or for a 3 night weekend.
