= McAlpin Nursing Home =

Historic Glasgow training and care home

Coordinates: 55.8672°N 4.2668°W

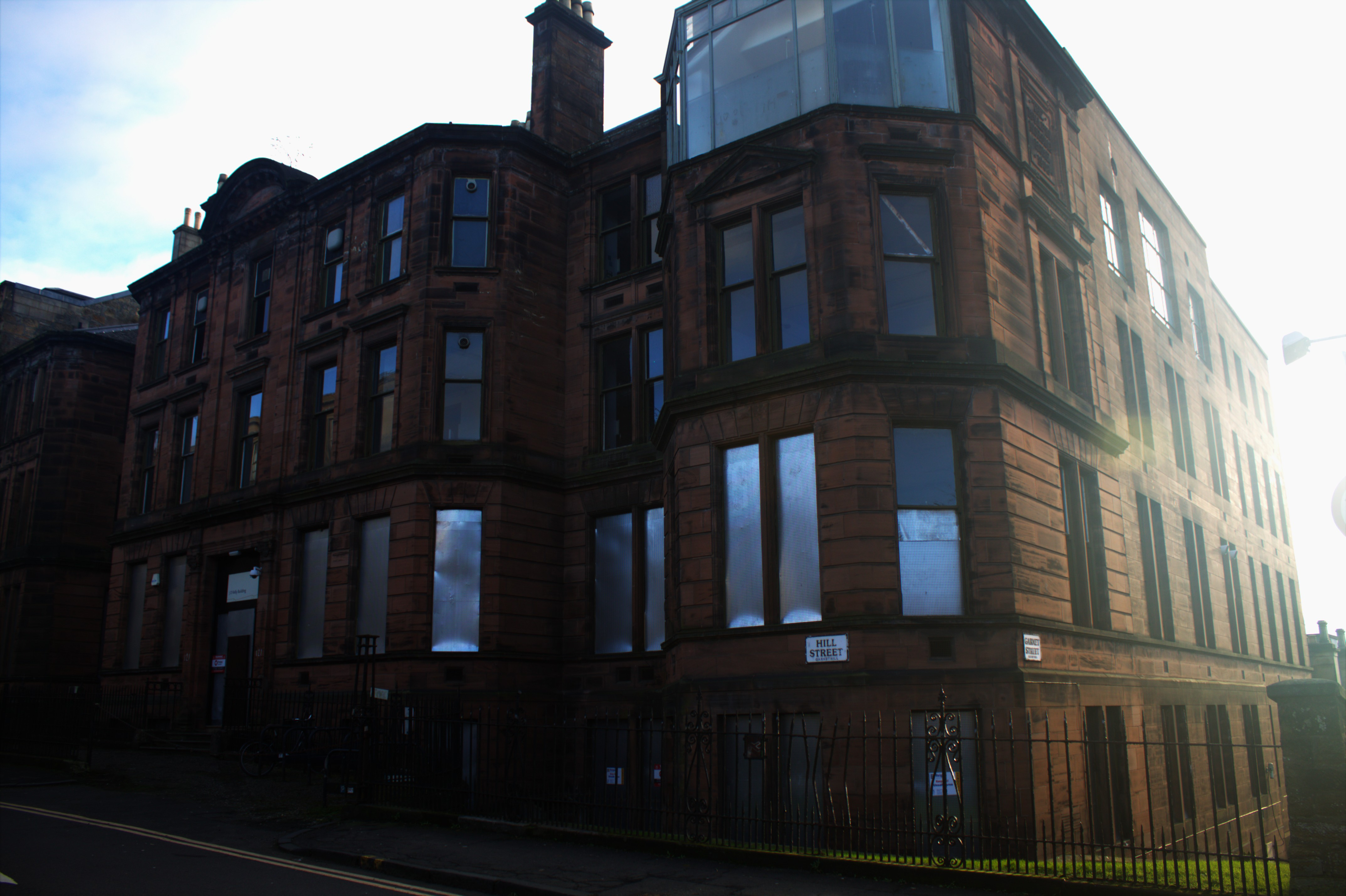
- Derelict building of McAlpin Nursing Home Glasgow
- Interactive map of the McAlpin Nursing Home area
- Former names: Glasgow Training Home for Nurses

General information
- Status: Historic (former) nursing home
- Type: Nursing home / private hospital / training home for nurses
- Location: Glasgow, Scotland

The McAlpin Nursing Home, originally known as the Glasgow Training Home for Nurses, was founded in Glasgow, Scotland, in 1874 by Miss Agnes McAlpin. It was regarded as a pioneering institution for training private nurses in Glasgow, raising the status of nurses in the West of Scotland and providing nursing care for those who were not eligible for free hospital care but could not afford private care.

== History ==
The home first opened at St George's Rd, Glasgow in 1874. McAlpin had the idea of training nurses for private care, not as a profit making company, but as a service to those who were sick.

Following its success it moved to Renfrew Street in order to accommodate more nurses and patients. Accommodation was available for the ladies in charge and for 33 nurses to live there. The Home had 10 rooms for private patients, and 2 wards with beds for 10 patients, an operating room, nurses' dining room, servants' rooms, sewing room, linen room, committee room, kitchen and laundry accommodation, stores room, nurses' box room, lavatories, and other necessary conveniences. While admitted patients received board, lodging, medical attendance, and nursing care. Medical attendance was either by physicians and surgeons attached to the Home, or by the patients own medical advisors (the latter was an additional charge). Persons suffering from infectious disorders were not be admitted into the Home, but trained nurses from the Home would attend patients with infectious diseases in their own homes. The lady superintendent had oversight of what patients paid for their care. The objects of The Glasgow Training Home for Nurses were to train or cause to be trained women of high character for the work of nursing the sick, and to employ them, either in the Home or in private families; to provide and maintain premises for the resident officials, the servants of the Institution, and the nurses, and also for the purposes of a private hospital for paying patients; and to do all such other things as are or shall at the time be deemed conducive to the encouragement or attainment of the above objects or any of them.

The home then moved to Hill St in 1908. The Home on Hill St was unusual in that it was purpose built as a nursing home. The architects were Messrs. Baird and Thomson. The Hill St building linked to the Renfrew St building by a covered gangway. In 1907 the institution successfully changed its name under The Companies Act to The McAlpin Nursing Home, Glasgow. A marble tablet in the hall of the new building had the following inscription in honour of McAlpin:

The McAlpin Nursing Home

Impressed by the lack of trained nurses in families during sickness and persuaded of the benefit of a nursing home for patients requiring special treatment and skilled nursing Miss McAlpin on February 9th 1874 opened the Glasgow training Home for Nurses in St George’s Road. The beneficent work then instituted grew rapidly in extent and importance until the original premises and those subsequently acquired failed to suffice for the demands of the home. This building is the outcome of Miss McAlpin’s aspirations and long-sustained effort aided by an appreciative public, to give the Home a worthy place in the service of the citizens. In seeing its completion she had found her 32 years devoted and honorary service crowned by appropriate award. On the reconstruction of the home her name was embodied in its new designation as a public recognition of her life work on behalf of the suffering.

When the Hill Street building opened it had accommodation for 24 private patients in single rooms, 6 in double rooms and 12 in two other wards. On opening there were 62 nurses, of whom 42 nursed patients in their homes, while the others worked in the institution. McAlpin continually raised funds for the construction of the building and to supplement the costs of care for the patients. During the opening ceremony the nurses held a sale of work to raise funds for the building project and to help in providing increased accommodation for ward patients. The accommodation for the nurses was regarded as of a high standard and included a conservatory where the nurses grew plants including tomatoes. They also had a sitting room with a piano donated by a benefactor.

Nurse probationers undertook a 3 ½ year training in private nursing. When they passed their end of training examination they were sent out to private cases. Those applying to be trained nurses were required be over 25 years but under 40 years. Training was carried out by the matron and doctors. For the first 6 months of employment nurses who started working for the McAlpin Nursing Home received board, lodging, uniform, and washing. They did not receive an allowance until they had competed a further 6 months and then received an allowance every 6 months until completing 3 years’ service. After this period nurses could re-engage with the Home and receive an allowance of £30 per year but must give three months’ notice should they want to leave.

In 1907 there were 364 patients admitted in the home and the nurses attended 528 cases of sickness in private homes. In 1914 there were 627 patients admitted to the Home for treatment, including 571 surgical cases and 56 medical and massage patients. In 1908 a total of 62 nurses worked for the McAlpin Nursing Home with 42 of those attending patients in their own homes.

In 1894 the late Dr Samuel J Moore left the residue of his estate to fund and support a convalescent home for nurses. The home, known as the Dr Samuel Johnstone Moore Convalescent Home for Nurses, was based in Busby. It was used as a temporary home for nurses whose health was temporarily or permanently broken down in the exercise of their profession. Preference was given to nurses who were directly connected to, and under the control of, the Glasgow Training Home for Nurses, later the McAlpin Nursing Home. It included a quarantine cottage used only by McAlpin nurses coming from infectious cases. This house was regarded as comfortable and spacious with central heating and a large conservatory situated in six acres of wooded grounds.

== Staff ==
Miss Agnes McAlpin, founder and Lady Superintendent of The Glasgow Training Home for Nurses/McAlpin Nursing Home for 32 years

Miss Jessie Campbell took over as Lady Superintendent on the retirement of McAlpin in 1907.
