= McCallum (surname) =

McCallum is a Scottish and Irish surname, meaning in Gaelic "Son of Columba" the influential 6th-century Christian saint who helped spread Christianity in Scotland and Ireland. Thought to be a member of the Ui Neill and possibly a member of its sub kingdom the Cenel Eoghain commonly found through Ulster and the western isles of Scotland. Notable people with the surname include:

- Alick McCallum (1877–1937), Australian politician
- Alison McCallum (born 1951), Australian rock singer
- Andrew McCallum, American computer scientist
- Angela McCallum, Trump campaign executive assistant
- Arnold McCallum (1931–2008), Northwest Territories politician
- Barney McCallum (1926–2019), given name David Brace McCallum, coinventor of the racket sport pickleball
- Bennett McCallum (1935–2022), American economist
- Bradley McCallum (born 1966), American artist
- Collette McCallum (born 1986), Australia women's football player
- Daniel McCallum (1815–1878), railroad engineer and manager
- David McCallum (1933–2023), British actor
- David McCallum, Sr. (1897–1972), British violinist
- David McCallum (sound editor), Canadian film and television sound designer and editor
- David McCallum (wrongful conviction) (born 1969), convicted murderer, exonerated of the charges after 29 years in prison after the murder of Nathan Blenner in 1985
- Don McCallum, artist, historian, and art critic
- Doug McCallum (21st century), former mayor of Surrey, British Columbia
- Dunc McCallum (1940–1983), professional ice hockey player
- Duncan McCallum (1888–1958), British Conservative politician
- Eileen McCallum (born 1936), Scottish actress
- Frank McCallum (died 1857), notorious bushranger
- Gavin McCallum (born 1987), Canadian soccer player
- Grace McCallum (born 2002), American artistic gymnast
- Gordon McCallum (1919–1989) American sound engineer
- H. McCallum (20th century), rugby league player
- Henry Edward McCallum (1852–1919), Newfoundland colonial leader
- Hiram E. McCallum (1900–1989), mayor of Toronto, Ontario
- Ian McCallum (born 1965), guitarist
- Jack McCallum, American sports writer
- James McCallum (cyclist) (born 1979), racing cyclist
- James McCallum (politician) (1806–1889), member of the Confederate House of Representatives
- Jay McCallum (born 1960), Louisiana state district court judge and former state representative
- Joanna McCallum (21st century), British theatre, film and television actress
- John McCallum (disambiguation), several people
  - John McCallum (1950–2025), Canadian politician, economist, diplomat and university professor
  - John McCallum (actor) (1918–2010), Australian film actor
  - John McCallum (sports writer) (1924–1988)
- Joseph S. McCallum (20th century), Alberta politician
- Karen McCallum, American bridge player
- Lachlin McCallum (1823–1903), Canadian politician
- Lucy McCallum, Australian judge
- Mike McCallum (1955–2025), Jamaican boxer
- Napoleon McCallum (born 1963), former professional American football player
- Neil McCallum (disambiguation), multiple people
- Nick McCallum (21st century), Australian journalist
- Pat McCallum (born 1969), curler
- Paul McCallum (Canadian football) (born 1970), professional Canadian football player
- Paul McCallum (footballer), English footballer
- Peter Duncan McCallum (1853–?), Ontario farmer and political figure
- R. B. McCallum (1898–1973), British historian at Oxford University
- Ray McCallum (born 1961), former player and head coach of the University of Detroit's basketball team
- Ray McCallum, Jr. (born 1991), professional NBA basketball player (Sacramento Kings)
- Richard McCallum (born 1984) Jamaican footballer
- Richard McCallum (1863–1940) New Zealand Liberal politician
- Rick McCallum (born 1952), film producer
- Robert Hope McCallum (1864–1939), Scottish builder and entrepreneur
- Robert McCallum, Jr. (born 1946), United States Ambassador to Australia
- Robert McCallum, Canadian documentary filmmaker
- Robin McCallum (21st century), British weather presenter
- Ron McCallum (born 1948), Australian legal academic
- Sally McCallum (born 1940), female track and field athlete
- Scott McCallum (born 1950), 43rd Governor of Wisconsin
- Stephanie McCallum (born 1956), classical pianist
- Thomas McCallum (1860–1938) pastoralist and politician in South Australia
- Trevor McCallum (21st century), former professional soccer player

== See also ==
- McCollum (surname)
- Clan Malcolm
