= Norman Maclean (moderator) =

Scottish minister and religious author

Norman Maclean (3 May 1869 – 15 January 1952) was a Scottish minister and religious author who served as Moderator of the General Assembly of the Church of Scotland in 1927. In his latter years he was Chaplain-in-Ordinary to the King.

== Life ==
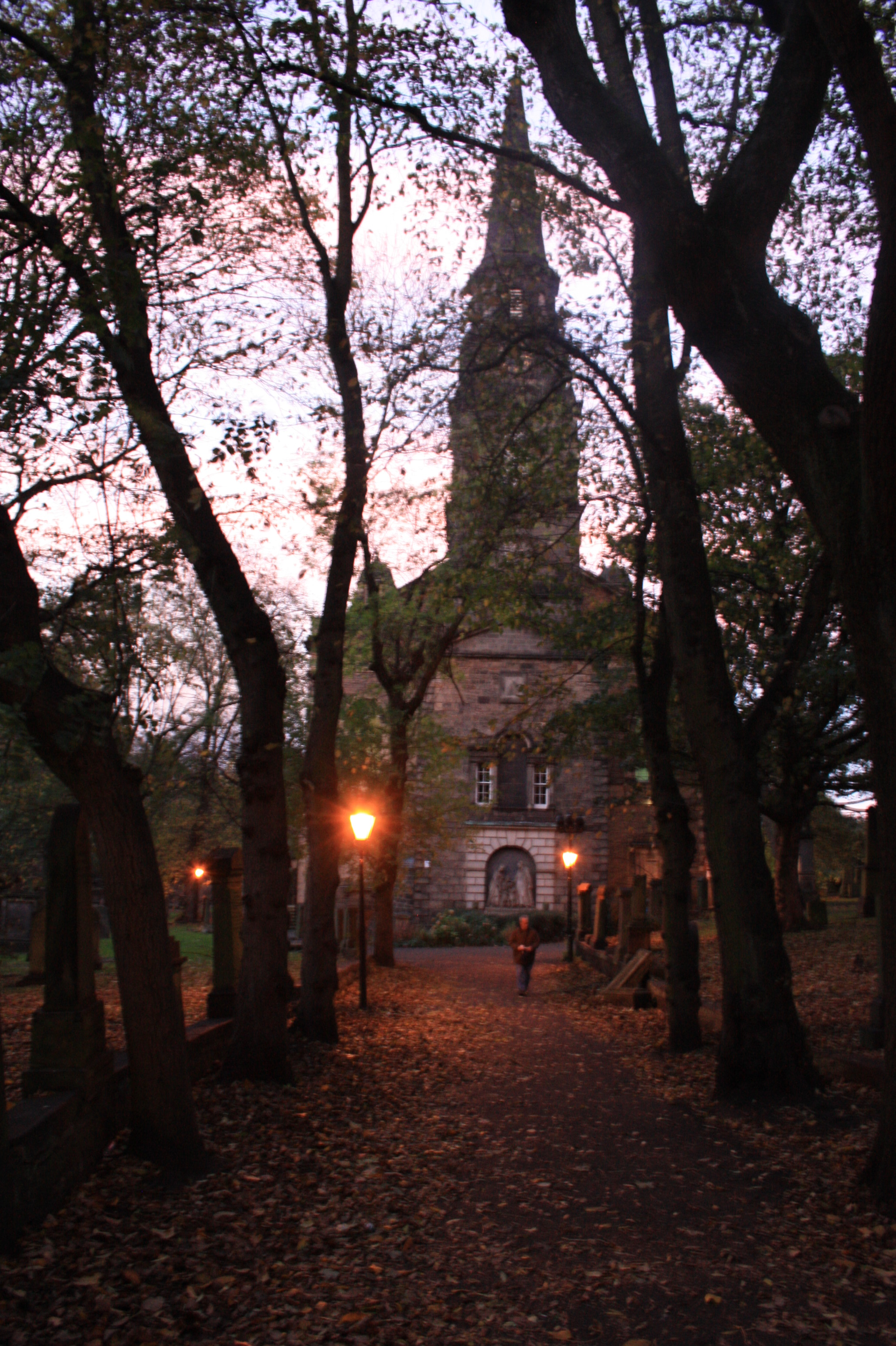
St Cuthbert's in Edinburgh

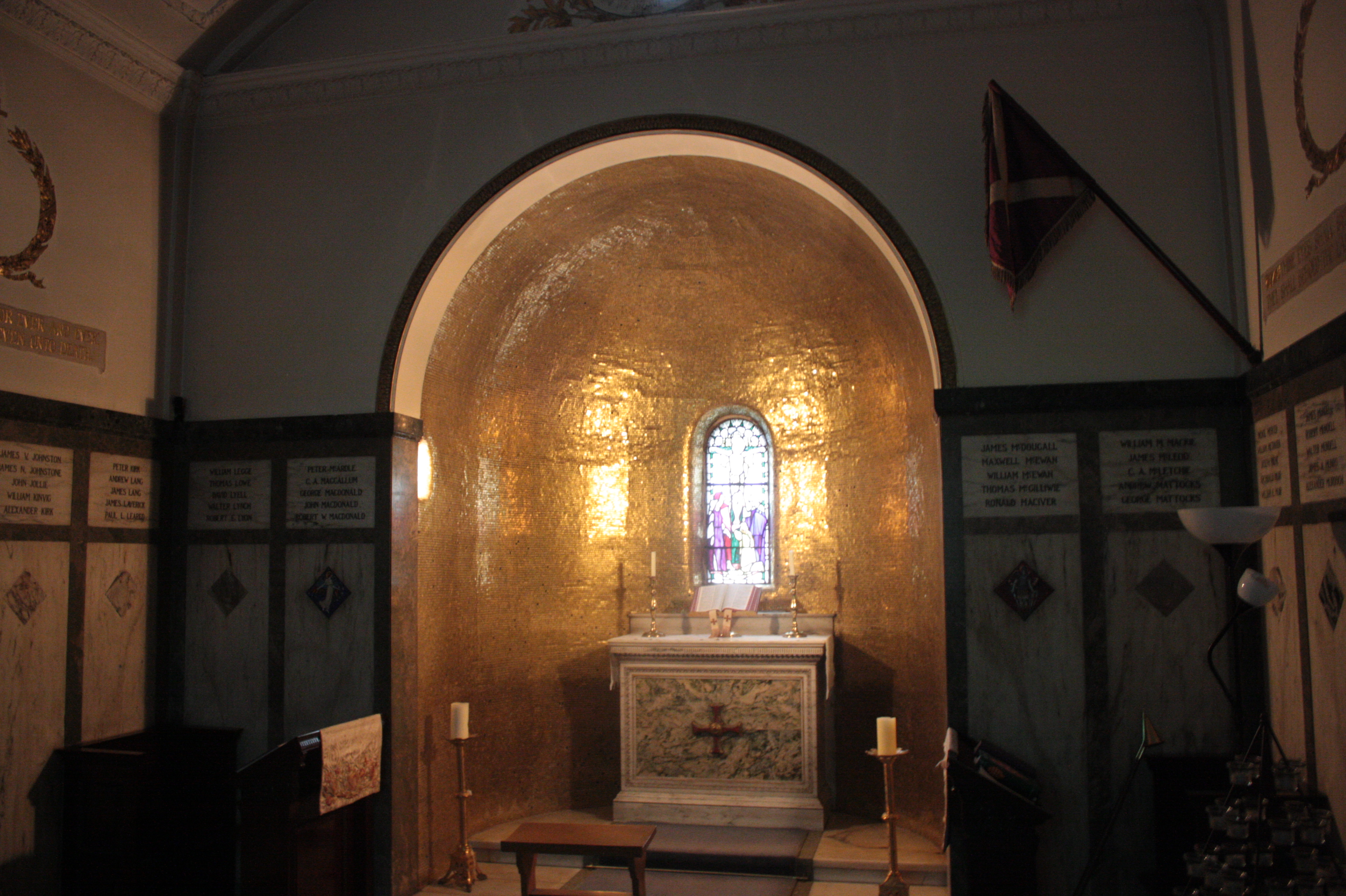
War Memorial Chapel, St Cuthbert's, Edinburgh

Maclean was born on the Isle of Skye in 1869. He was licensed to preach by the Presbytery of Skye in 1892 and was appointed to the mission church on Kyleakin. However, after only two weeks he was summoned to Inverness to meet Rev Norman MacLeod who asked him to take over Benbecula parish church. He stayed there for four months, lodging at an inn near North Ford.

He was the minister of St Cuthbert's Church, Edinburgh from 1915 to 1936, succeeding Rev William Lyall Wilson. In 1921 he was Convenor of the Scottish Churches Memorial Project overseeing war memorials across the country. He was specifically involved in the creation of the beautiful war memorial chapel in St Cuthberts, designed by the Glasgow architect Peter MacGregor Chalmers.

In 1927 Maclean succeeded John Donaldson McCallum as Moderator.

In 1929 he was Convenor of the Committee overseeing the reunification of the United Free Church of Scotland with the established Church of Scotland.

In 1934 he was living at 6 Grosvenor Gardens in Edinburgh.

Maclean retired to Portree in Skye in 1936. His position at St Cuthbert's was filled by Rev Adam Wilson Burnett.

From 1939 to 1941 he worked in St Andrew's Church in Jerusalem. His advocation of the restoration of a Jewish homeland caused the church authorities to remove him in January 1941. He returned to Portree.

== Publications ==
- Dwellers in the Mist (1902)
- Stand Up, Ye Dead (1916)
- Hills of Home (1916)
- The Message of Bethlehem (1926)
- A Christmas Message (1929)
- Services for Holy Week and Easter (1929)
- Jerusalem, the Mother of us All (1939)
- Christmas in Palestine (1940)
- His Terrible Swift Sword (1942)
- The Former Days (1945) (autobiography)
- Set Free (1949) (further autobiography)

== Family ==
Maclean was father to Margaret Hope MacPherson, known as the "First Lady of Crofting".
