= Colinton =

Suburb of Edinburgh, Scotland

Coordinates: 55°54′30″N 3°15′00″W

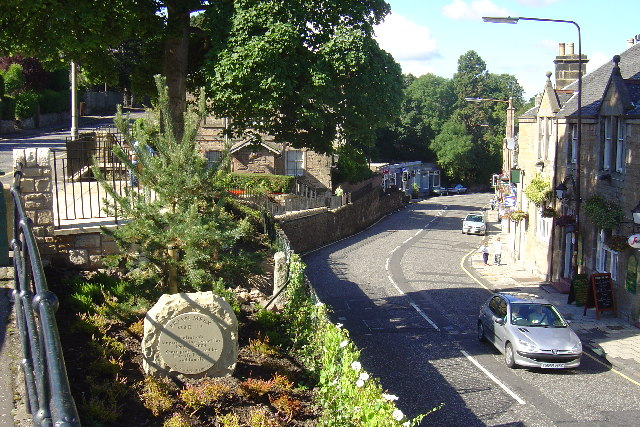
- Bridge Street, Colinton in 2005

- Location within the City of Edinburgh council area Location within Scotland
- OS grid reference: NT214689
- Council area: City of Edinburgh
- Country: Scotland
- Sovereign state: United Kingdom
- Post town: EDINBURGH
- Postcode district: EH13
- Dialling code: 0131
- Police: Scotland
- Fire: Scottish
- Ambulance: Scottish
- UK Parliament: Edinburgh South West
- Scottish Parliament: Edinburgh Pentlands

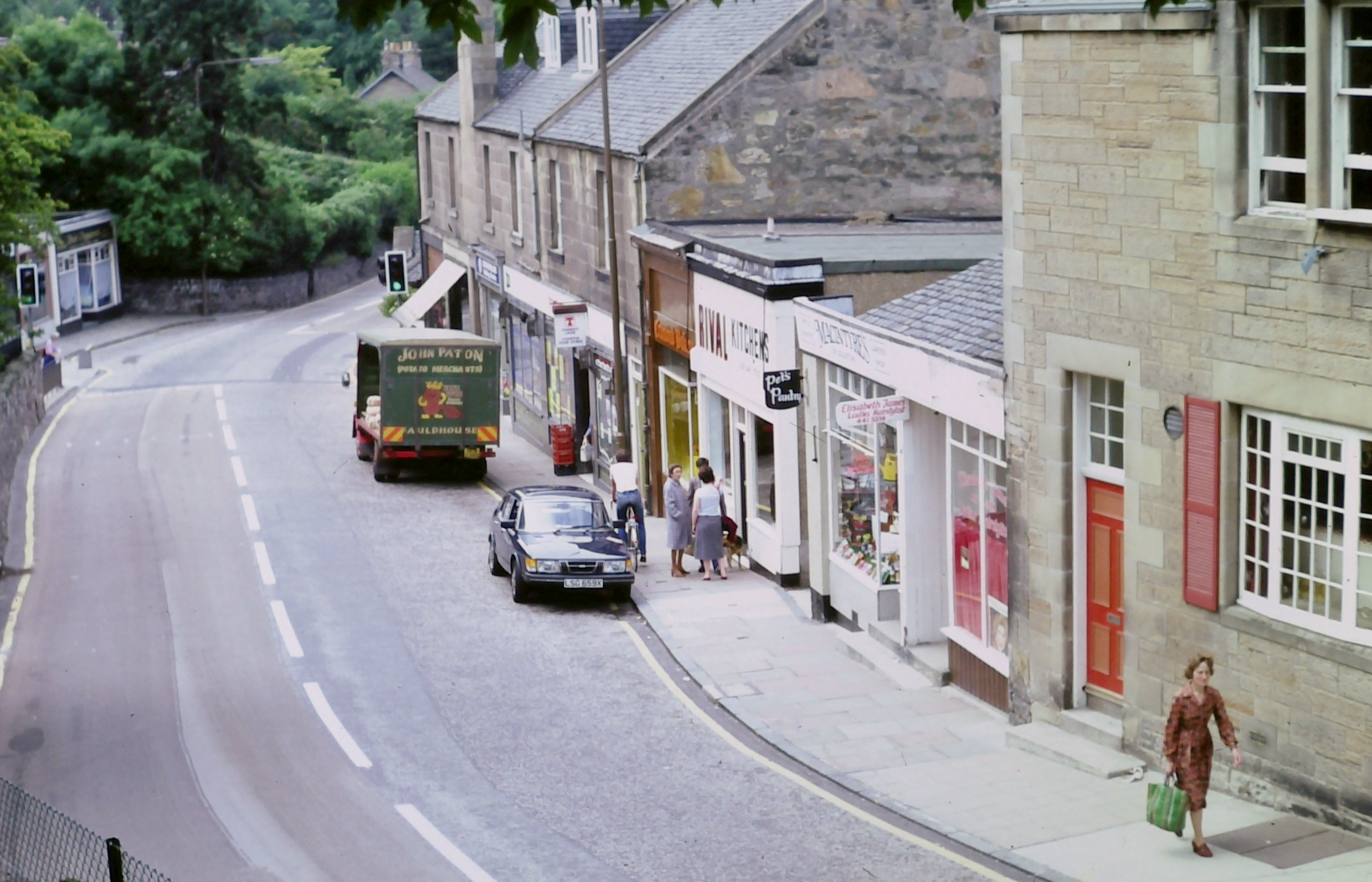
The same street in the 1980s

Colinton is a suburb of Edinburgh, Scotland situated 3 1/2 miles (5.5 kilometres) southwest of the city centre. Up until the late 18th century it appears on maps as Collington. It is bordered by Dreghorn to the south and Craiglockhart to the north-east. To the north-west it extends to Lanark Road (the A70) and to the south-west to the City Bypass. Bonaly is a subsection of the area on its southern side.

Colinton is a designated conservation area.

== History ==
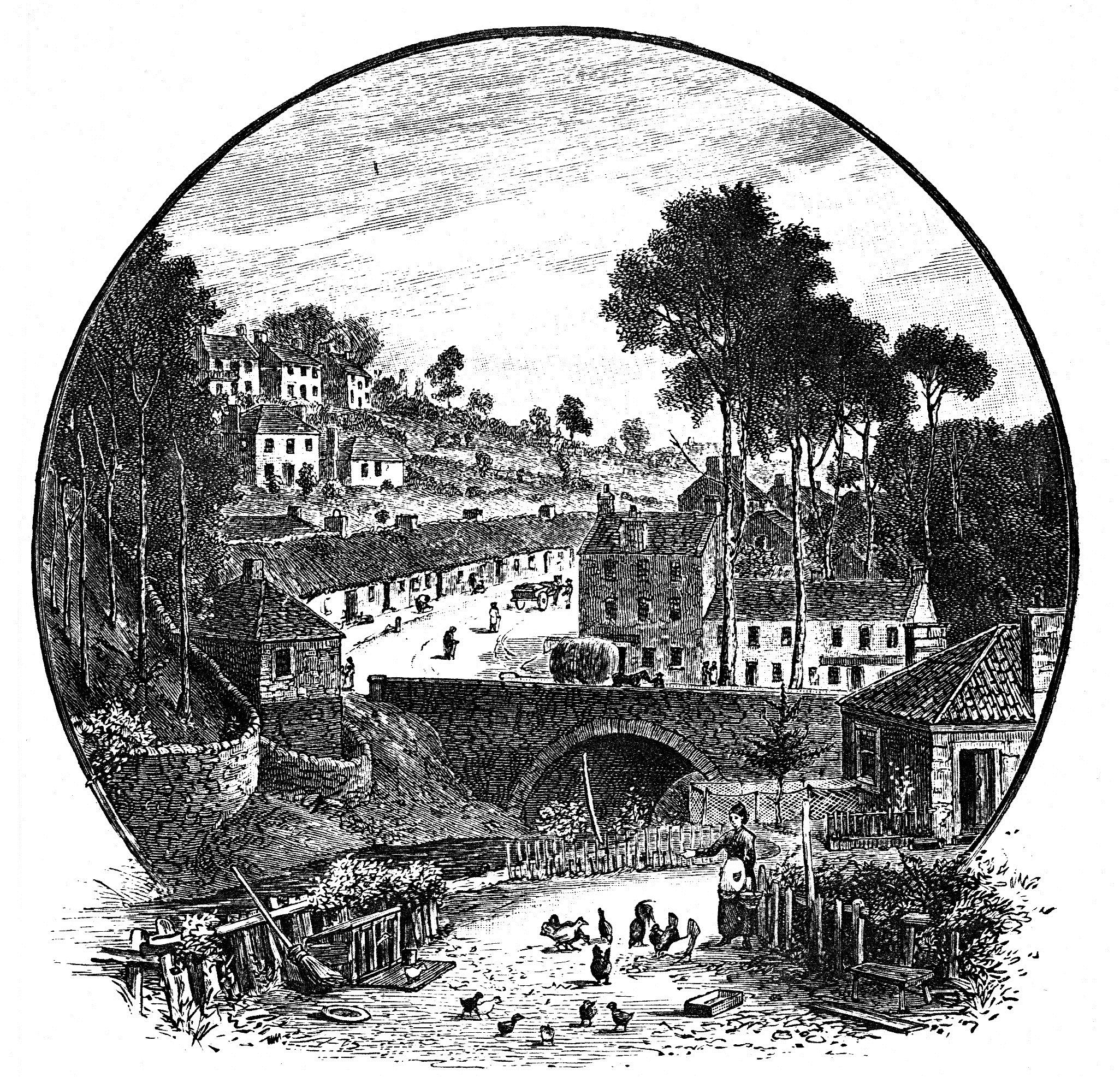
Colinton in the 19th century

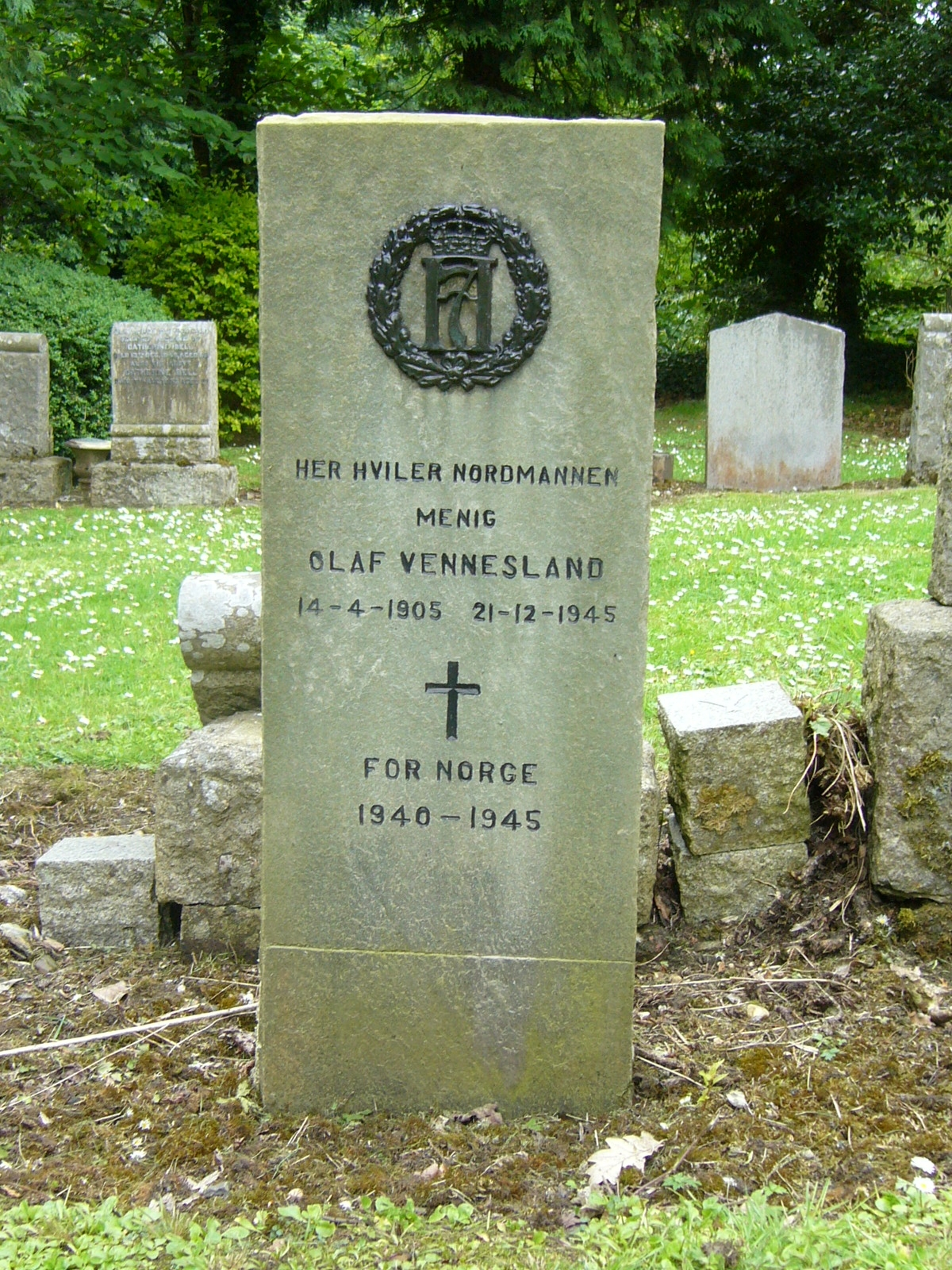
Grave of Olaf Vennesland, Colinton Kirkyard

Originally sited within a steep-sided glen on a convenient fording point on the Water of Leith, and expanding from there, Colinton's history dates back to before the 11th century.

Close to the Water of Leith is Colinton Parish Church, correctly called St Cuthbert's Parish Church, which was founded as the Church of Halis (Hailes) around 1095 by Elthelred, third son of Malcolm III and Queen Margaret. The current exterior largely dates from 1907 but the structure dates from 1650. The entrance is marked by a lych gate, rare in Scotland and more common in southern England. The cemetery (on the lower slopes to the south) contains the village war memorial. One notable grave within the cemetery is that of a Norwegian soldier, Olaf Vennesland.

The name of the village is first recorded in 1296 as Colgyntoun, meaning the farm of someone with the Celtic name "Colgan". By the 14th century, it had become known as Colbanestoun. According to the Colinton Local History Society, it was named after a "notable resident" named Colban. The name was eventually contracted to Colinton.

In May 1599 an English adventurer Edmund Ashfield came to Colinton and met James VI, and in September another English visitor Henry Lee with David Foulis watched James VI hunting from the tower of the castle, then he stopped there for a meal.

The village was occupied by ten companies of General Monk's Regiment (now known as the Coldstream Guards) on 18 August 1650 prior to their attack on Colinton Castle and Redhall during the English Civil War.

The nearby 15th-century Colinton Castle, in the grounds of what is now Merchiston Castle School, was destroyed by Oliver Cromwell during his invasion of Scotland. Following repair, the castle was subsequently partially demolished by the artist Alexander Nasmyth in order to create a picturesque ruin.

Other notable figures with connections to Colinton include: Robert Louis Stevenson who spent the summers of his childhood at the manse when his grandfather was the village's Parish Minister; the philanthropist James Gillespie; and architects Sir Robert Rowand Anderson and John James Burnet, who all lived in the village.

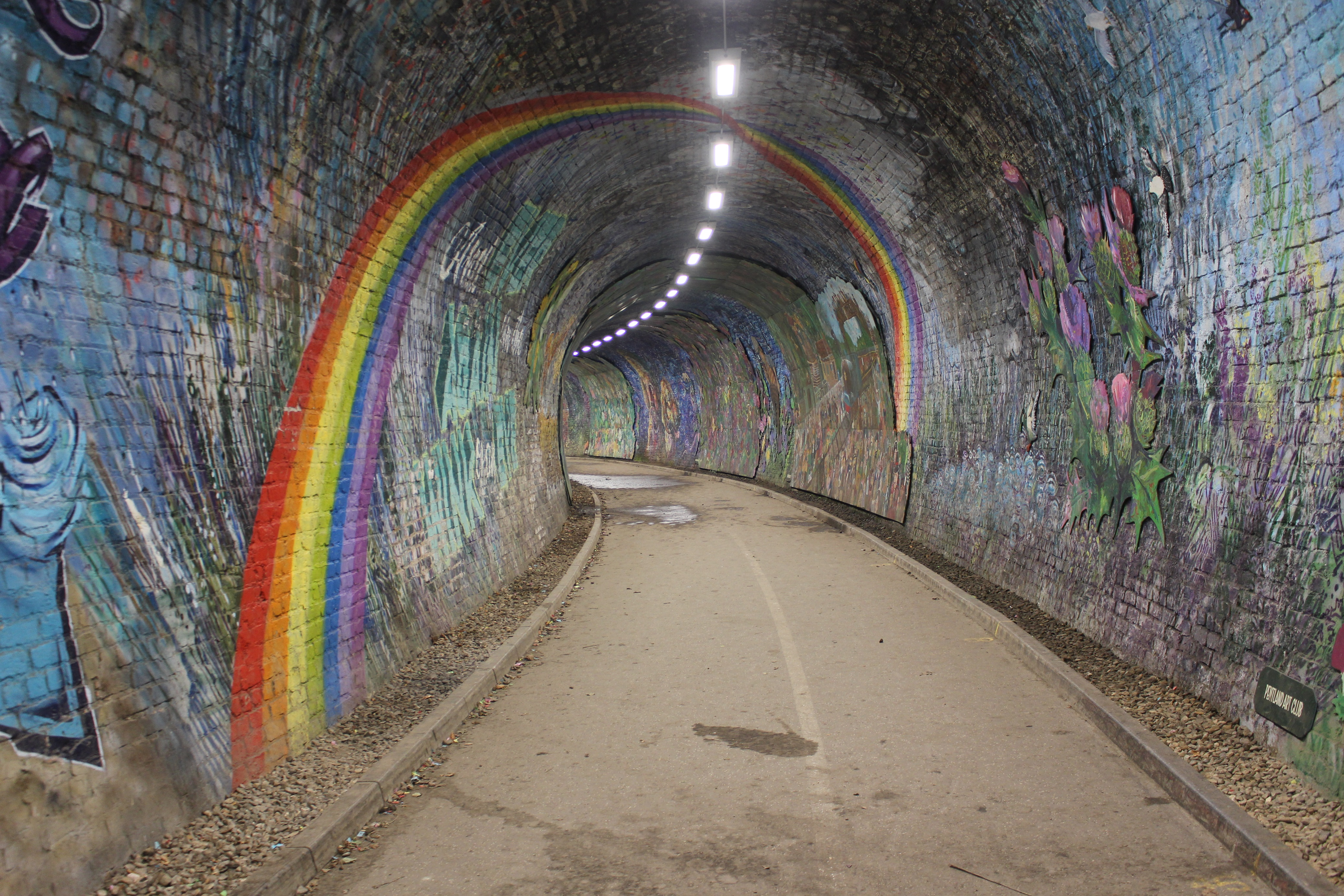
Inside the Colinton Tunnel, a former railway tunnel that has since become part of a walking and cycling route and is now decorated with murals

A number of innovative Arts and Crafts style cottages were also constructed in the village in the early 1900s by the architect Sir Robert Lorimer. Between 1909 and 1915, the War Office constructed Redford Barracks to the east of the village. The barracks represent the largest military installation built in Scotland since Fort George in the Highlands and they provide military accommodation, together with offices and training facilities. As part of the UK government's defence spending review, Redford and Dreghorn Barracks are deemed surplus to requirements and earmarked for disposal.

The village was the location for mills producing textiles, snuff, and paper. The Caledonian Railway Company constructed a spur line connecting Slateford and Balerno in 1874, with a station at Colinton. This line continued to carry passengers until 1943, but closed altogether when the carriage of freight was discontinued in 1967.

Colinton Parish was amalgamated into Edinburgh on 1 November 1920. As of 2007, it forms a core part of the Colinton/Fairmilehead multi-member ward for the City of Edinburgh Council.

== Colinton today ==
Although now a well-established suburb of Edinburgh, the original heart of Colinton is still referred to as "Colinton Village", with small speciality shops and many original buildings remaining intact.

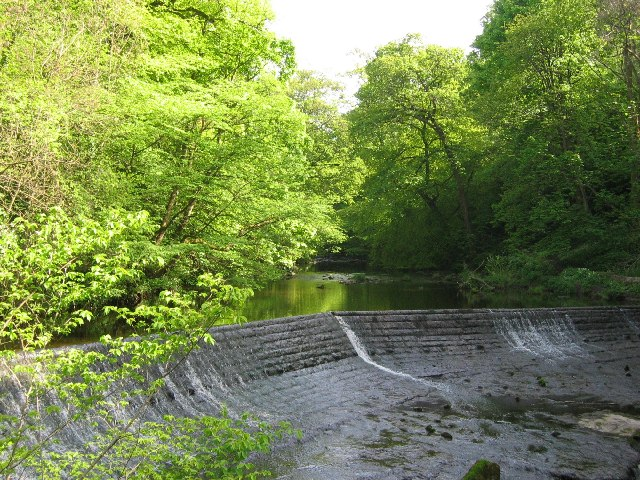
The Water of Leith in Colinton Dell.

The Dell extends along the Water of Leith Walkway from Colinton Parish Church towards Slateford, and contains a mixture of mature and ancient woodland. It is a natural habitat for wildlife. The walkway and cycle path pass by original mill buildings and an old tunnel that dates back to when the path was part of the local railway line. Spylaw Park is situated within the area.

Colinton is served by Colinton Primary School, Bonaly Primary School, Firrhill High School. Merchiston Castle School, east of the village, is an independent all-boys boarding school.

The major route to the city centre, Colinton Road, runs from Colinton through Craiglockhart to Holy Corner, a part of Burghmuirhead between Morningside and Bruntsfield. Along the road are a number of significant Victorian and Edwardian villas, some of which were designed by Edward Calvert.

== Publications ==
Colinton Magazine, published by Colinton Amenity Association, is a full-colour A4-sized glossy publication which includes articles about the past, present and future of the village and surrounding area. Currently, copies are hand-delivered to most households within the area, once a year in November.

Monthly A5-sized title The Dell Directory is a sister publication of the various editions of Konect magazine distributed in West Lothian and south-west Edinburgh. Copies are delivered to 5,500 households across Colinton and neighbouring Craiglockhart and Kingsknowe.

C&B News – originally Currie & Balerno News – is a monthly volunteer-run “local community news magazine” (available in print and as a downloadable PDF) covering Colinton and neighbouring Currie, Balerno, Baberton Mains and Juniper Green. Originally launched in February 1976, and published 10 times a year, the magazine features local news and articles, contributions from local political representatives, and updates on local planning issues—all voluntarily submitted by local residents. The magazine published its 500th issue in October 2024and celebrated its 50th anniversary in February 2026.

Congregational-focused church magazines in the area include The Sign (St Cuthbert’s Scottish Episcopal Church) and The Parish Publication (Edinburgh Pentlands Parish Church of Scotland, formed from the union of the former Colinton Parish Church and Juniper Green Kirk in 2024).

== Demographics ==
Ethnicity	Colinton/Fairmilehead Ward	Edinburgh
White	90.1%	84.9%
Asian	5.1%	8.6%
Black	1.4%	2.1%
Mixed	1.4%	2.5%
Other	2.0%	1.9%

== Transport ==
See also Transport in Edinburgh

The following bus routes, operated by Lothian Buses pass through Colinton village and the surrounding roads:

- Number 10 bus — Ocean Terminal (through city via Princes Street) to Bonaly
- Number 16 bus and Number N16 night bus — Silverknowes (through city via Princes Street) to Torphin
- Number 18 bus — Fort Kinnaird (through suburbs) to Edinburgh Airport
- Number 45 bus — Heriot-Watt University Riccarton Campus to King's Road via South and North bridges.

Colinton railway station served the area between 1874 and 1943. The Water of Leith cycle path now follows much of the former trackbed.

== Notable residents ==
- Archibald Alison – didactic and philosophical writer
- William Alison - Physician and social reformer, lived at Woodville.
- John Allen – eighteenth and nineteenth century political and historical writer
- Henry Mackenzie – novelist
- Lord Cockburn – judge and biographer, died at his estate in Bonaly, Colinton.
- John MacWhirter – landscape painter
- Calum Elliot – professional footballer
- David Foulis of Colinton – landowner and diplomat
- Thomas Foulis – goldsmith and financier
- James Gillespie – merchant and philanthropist
- Fred Goodwin – former CEO of Royal Bank of Scotland
- Mo Johnston – professional footballer and manager
- Loudon MacQueen Douglas FRSE – antiquarian and author.
- Margaret Hope MacPherson – crofter, politician, and activist; born here.
- Craig Gordon – professional footballer
- Craig Reid – musician, the Proclaimers
- Stuart "Woody" Wood – musician, the Bay City Rollers
- John Byrne – artist and playwright (The Slab Boys)
- Ramsay Heatley Traquair, his wife Phoebe Traquair and son Harry Moss Traquair.

== See also ==
These areas are sometimes taken to be parts of Colinton, or to be neighbouring areas in their own right:

- Bonaly
- Dreghorn Barracks
- Redford
- Torphin
- Woodfield
- Woodhall
