= Kilt pin =

Decorative pin worn on the apron of a kilt

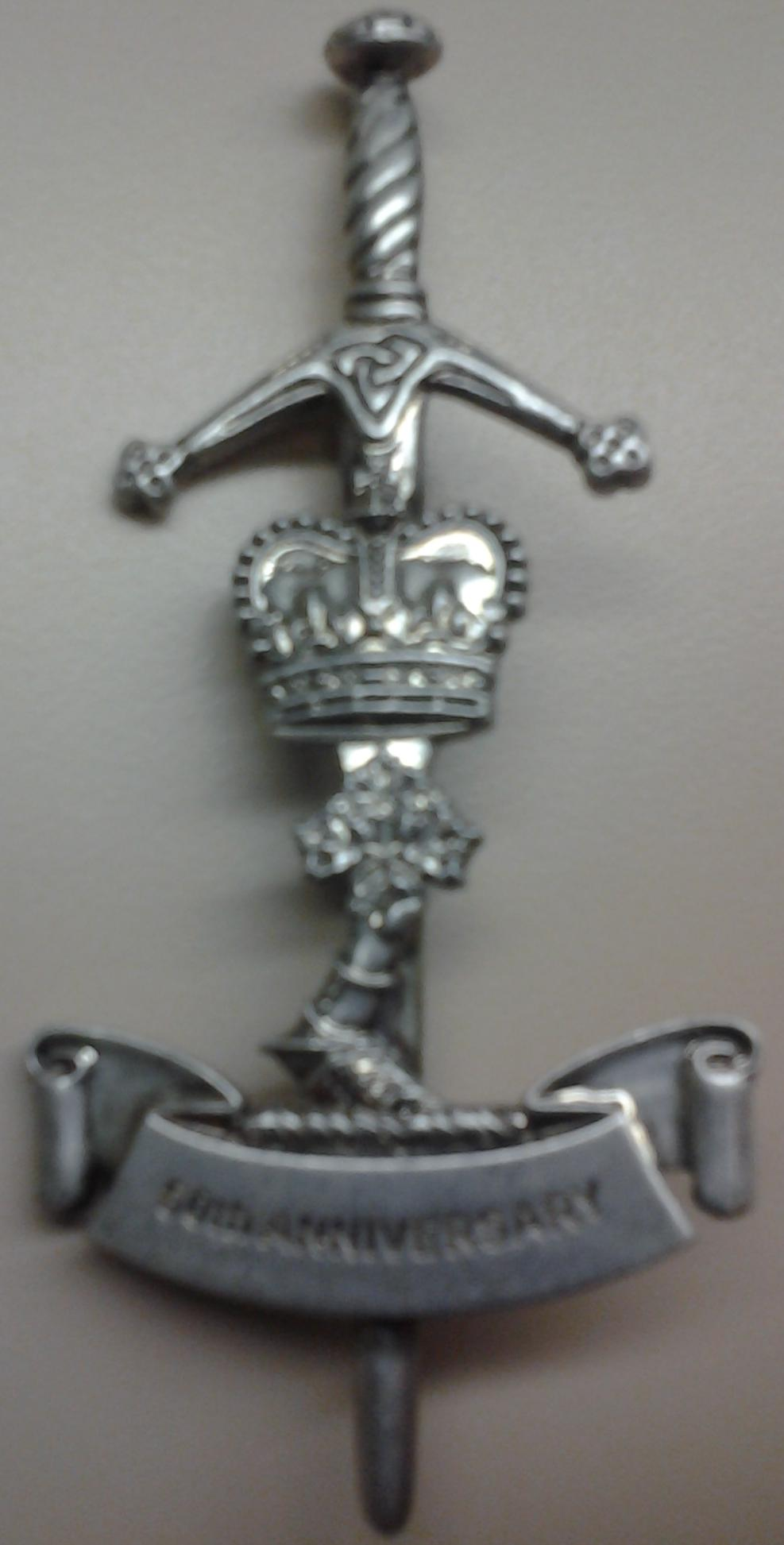
Royal Military College of Canada Bands 60th anniversary kilt pin 2013

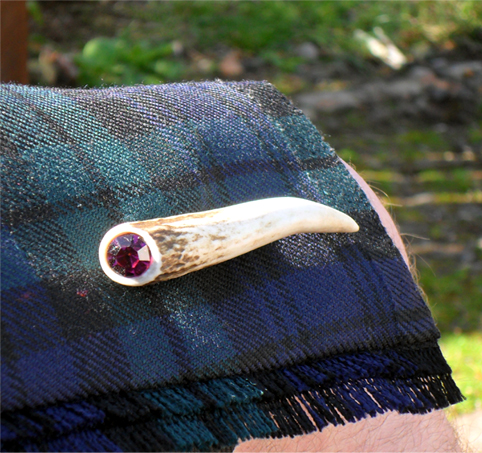
Antler Kilt Pin

The kilt pin is a piece of jewellery that is usually worn on the lower corner of the outer apron of a kilt. Its function is to prevent the apron falling or blowing open, by adding weight to the outer apron, and it is commonly seen as a form of decoration. It does not pin the outer apron to the inner fabric, which is a common misconception.

It is common for kilt pins to be decorative, with many featuring clan symbols, national emblems, or native animals and plants. Contemporary kilt pins often symbolise personal interests, favourite places or they are personalised for the wearer.

== History ==
The birth of the kilt pin is somewhat disputed and has led to many stories. While they cannot be factually verified, they provide entertainment and intrigue for all those looking into the history of this traditional Scottish accessory.

The custom of wearing a pin came in during Queen Victoria's reign to stop the kilt apron flapping about too much and showing more of the wearer's anatomy than the Queen liked. The story goes that the Queen gave her own brooch to a soldier who was struggling with his kilt in windy conditions. Author J. Charles Thompson writes that Queen Victoria brought in rules stating that all military kilts must have a fastening, and although the soldiers then wore kilt pins, they didn't fasten the layers of cloth with them as that would change the way the kilt hung.

For Highlanders, their dress provided them with an opportunity to display as much wealth as they could afford. Therefore, ornamentation, such as kilt pins, was very important. Even those who were less well off spent lavishly on these accessories, which were ornate and had precious and semi-precious stones set in them. Money spent here was also for practical reasons, as if a clansman died, the silver accessories on his dress would cover the cost of a decent burial.

Kilt pins come in different styles and are appropriate for different occasions. The simplest style of pin is a large safety pin. This, or a blanket pin, is suggested for sports dress, whereas a more ornate pin would be appropriate for formal day wear, and a silver pin with a stone set in it would be expected for evening wear. In this way, the kilt pin matches the formality of the dress and occasion.

== Protecting the kilt ==
Some people think that a kilt pin could damage a kilt. As the 1914 President of the Scottish Society, Loudon MacQueen Douglas pointed out, a "claw brooch" (a popular style, usually made from a grouse foot) is easily caught on a lady's dress while dancing, potentially damaging both the dress and the kilts. A precaution can be taken in applying buttonhole stitching around the hole where the kilt pin goes into the cloth. This strengthens the cloth so that tearing is less likely. Placing a piece of leather behind the front apron and attaching the kilt pin through the cloth and the leather could also reduce the likelihood of tearing.

== Other fastenings ==
After Queen Victoria introduced the rule that military kilts should have a fastening, The Black Watch chose to use ribbons rather than a pin. The green ribbons were positioned in the same place as a kilt pin would have been; however, similar to soldiers who had kilt pins, they did not actually fasten them as they were too proud of their uniform and did not want to spoil the way the kilt hung by tying the ribbons.
