= MacCallum =

MacCallum is a Scottish surname or given name. Notable people with the name include:

- James MacCallum Smith (1868–1939), Australian politician, newspaper proprietor and stock breeder
- MacCallum Grant (1845–1928), Canadian businessman
- MacCallum Scott (1874–1928), Scottish politician
- Martha MacCallum (born 1964), American news anchor
- Mungo Wentworth MacCallum (1941–2020), Australian journalist
- Mungo William MacCallum (1854–1942), Chancellor of the University of Sydney
- Spencer MacCallum (21st century), American anthropologist
- Taber MacCallum (21st century), one of the original crewmembers of Biosphere 2
- William George MacCallum (1874–1944), Canadian physician

== See also ==
- Clan MacCallum
- Kellie-MacCallum
- McCallum (disambiguation)
