= John McCallum (disambiguation) =

John McCallum (1950–2025) was a Canadian politician.

John McCallum may also refer to:

- John McCallum (actor) (1918–2010), Australian actor
- John McCallum (Australian politician) (1892–1973), Australian politician
- John McCallum (badminton) (1883–1967), Irish badminton player and administrator
- John McCallum (naval architect) (1920–1995), Scottish naval architect
- John McCallum (sports writer) (1924–1988), American sportswriter and author
- John Donaldson McCallum (fl. 1881–1926), Scottish minister
- John McCallum (British politician) (1847–1920), Scottish soap manufacturer and politician

== See also ==
- John MacCallum (1883–1957), Scottish rugby union player
