= McCullum =

McCullum is the surname of several people:

- Brendon McCullum (born 1981), New Zealand cricketer, brother of Nathan, son of Stuart
- Mac McCullum, a character in the Left Behind Christian novel series
- Nathan McCullum (born 1980), New Zealand cricketer, brother of Brendon, son of Stuart
- Robert McCullum (born 1954), American collegiate basketball coach
- Sam McCullum (born 1952), American football wide receiver
- Stuart McCullum (born 1956), New Zealand cricketer
- Donna Culver Krebbs, a character in the American television series Dallas, née Donna McCullum
- Melinda O'Hearn, American actress, professional wrestler, and model, née Melina McCullum

== See also ==
- McCallum (disambiguation)
