= Money from Home =

1953 film by George Marshall

Money From Home
- Directed by: George Marshall
- Screenplay by: Hal Kanter; James Allardice (adaptation); Hal Kanter (adaptation)
- Story by: Damon Runyon
- Produced by: Hal B. Wallis
- Starring: Dean Martin; Jerry Lewis; Marjie Millar; Pat Crowley; Robert Strauss
- Cinematography: Daniel L. Fapp
- Edited by: Warren Low
- Music by: Score: Leigh Harline; Songs: Joseph J. Lilley (music); Jack Brooks (lyrics)
- Distributed by: Paramount Pictures
- Release date: December 31, 1953
- Running time: 99 minutes
- Country: United States
- Language: English
- Budget: $2 million
- Box office: $3.5 million (US); 488,392 admissions (France)

Money From Home is a 1953 American comedy film starring Dean Martin and Jerry Lewis. The comedy was the first for the Martin and Lewis team to be shot in color and was their only film in 3-D. The picture was premiered as a special preview screening across the U.S. on New Year's Eve, 1953.

== Plot ==
New York City in the 1920s is where gambler "Honey Talk" Nelson crosses paths with bookie "Jumbo" Schneider. Nelson has two choices, cement shoes or "fixing" a horse race in Maryland. Naturally, Nelson heads to Maryland with his cousin Virgil Yokum tagging along.

Once in Maryland, Nelson falls for the owner of the horse that has been chosen for the "fix". Virgil has also fallen in love, with the horse's veterinarian.

Nelson decides that love should prevail and refuses to go along with the plan. Meanwhile, an English jockey, who is to ride the horse, is prevented from performing his job by Schneider's mobsters and Yokum winds up riding the horse to victory.

== Cast ==
- Dean Martin as Herman "Honey Talk" Nelson
- Jerry Lewis as Virgil Yokum
- Marjie Millar as Phyllis Leigh
- Patricia "Pat" Crowley as Dr. Autumn Claypool
- Richard Haydn as Bertie Searles
- Robert Strauss as Seldom Seen Kid
- Gerald Mohr as Marshall Preston
- Sheldon Leonard as Jumbo Schneider
- Romo Vincent as The Poojah
- Jack Kruschen as Short Boy
- Charles Horvath as Big Midge (billed as Charles Frank Horvath)
- Richard Reeves as Russian Henry (billed as Richard J. Reeves)
- Lou Lubin as Sam
- Frank Richards as Angry Truck Driver
- Harry Hayden as First Race Judge

== Songs ==
Joseph J. Lilley and Jack Brooks wrote the "Be Careful Song" and "Love Is the Same (All Over the World)". "Moments Like This", by Burton Lane and Frank Loesser, and "I Only Have Eyes for You", by Harry Warren and Al Dubin, were written for earlier films.

== Production ==
The team's eleventh feature, Money from Home was the first Martin and Lewis film made in color, although they did make a color, cameo appearance in the 1952 Bob Hope and Bing Crosby film, Road to Bali. It was filmed from March 9 to May 1, 1953.

Money From Home is also the only Martin and Lewis film made in 3-D, having been shot with Technicolor's 3-D camera rig, which exposed six strips of film in synchronization. It was the second and final time the rig was used. The film was also the third and last time one of the team's features was available with a Western Electric, 3-track stereophonic soundtrack. This soundtrack is now lost.

The film was premiered on New Year's Eve, 1953 as a special preview in 322 theaters. Because of a technical issue at Technicolor, pairs of prints necessary for 3-D were not available, so the film was previewed in 2-D. The film went into general release in February, 1954.

Lewis received an additional on-screen credit: "Special Material in Song Numbers Staged by Jerry Lewis." It was the only time during the team's productions that Lewis received creative credit, despite co-writing and co-directing several of the pictures.

== Reception ==
On the review aggregator website Rotten Tomatoes, 64% of 25 critics' reviews are positive. The website's consensus reads: "Presenting the usual Dean Martin and Jerry Lewis antics but in punchy 3D Technicolor, Money from Home is a respectable outing with the comedic duo that doesn't add many new wrinkles to their well-worn shtick."

== Home media ==
After being excluded from both Paramount Pictures Martin and Lewis DVD collections, released in 2006 and 2007, Money from Home saw a single-disc DVD release on July 1, 2008, and a blu-ray release on June 27, 2017.

The 3-D version of the film will be released on blu-ray on August 11, 2026.

== See also ==
- List of films about horses
- List of films about horse racing
