= Macallum =

Macallum is a surname. Notable people with the name include:

- Archibald Macallum (1858–1934), Canadian biochemist
- Hamilton Macallum (1841–1896), Scottish painter
- Charles John Macallum, known as Rabbit Mac (born 1983), Hip Hop and Rap based Indian singer from Malaysia

== See also ==
- McCallum (disambiguation)
