= About Mrs. Leslie =

1954 film

- 1954 theatrical poster
- Directed by: Daniel Mann
- Written by: Ketti Frings; Hal Kanter
- Based on: About Mrs. Leslie by Viña Delmar
- Produced by: Hal Wallis
- Starring: Shirley Booth; Robert Ryan; Marjie Millar; Alex Nicol
- Cinematography: Ernest Laszlo
- Edited by: Warren Low
- Music by: Victor Young
- Production company: Hal Wallis Productions
- Distributed by: Paramount Pictures
- Release dates: June 27, 1954 (New York City); June 29, 1954 (Los Angeles); August 3, 1954 (General)
- Running time: 104 minutes
- Country: United States
- Language: English
- Box office: $1.6 million

About Mrs. Leslie is a 1954 American drama film directed by Daniel Mann and starring Shirley Booth and Robert Ryan. It was nominated for a BAFTA Award in 1955.

== Plot ==
Vivien Leslie, a Beverly Hills, California rooming house owner, reminisces in flashbacks about her past and her transition from a New York City nightclub entertainer to a dress-shop owner. She had a longtime but mostly platonic affair with the mysterious, lonely aviation industrialist George Leslie, who had originally hired her as a vacation companion on a trip to California. Though they enjoy each other's company annually at a peaceful oceanside retreat, George tells Vivien nothing of his life until she accidentally learns of his career and marriage. George, who has taken an important government job during the war, is killed, and his will decrees that Vivien may purchase a house.

Vivien's neighbors and tenants include a young couple aspiring to television success and a dimwitted teenage girl.

== Cast ==
- Shirley Booth as Mrs. Vivien Leslie
- Robert Ryan as George Leslie
- Marjie Millar as Nadine Roland
- Alex Nicol as Lan McKay
- Sammy White as Harry Willey
- James Bell as Herbert Poole
- Eilene Janssen as Pixie Croffman
- Philip Ober as Mort Finley
- Harry Morgan as Fred Blue
- Ann McCrea as Nightclub girl

== Production ==
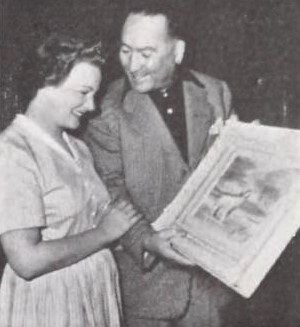
Shirley Booth and producer Hal Wallis (1953)

The film is based on the novel About Mrs. Leslie by Viña Delmar. Paramount purchased the rights to Delmar's novel in June 1950, and tentatively assigned the project to George Stevens.

In September 1953, The Hollywood Reporter reported that Paul Nathan, story editor and casting director for the "recently dissolved Hal Wallis Productions," was to "start work" on the picture, but the exact nature and extent of his contribution have not been determined.

== Reception ==
In a contemporary review for The New York Times, critic A. H. Weiler called the film "a somewhat lengthy tale, cluttered by some distracting flashbacks" and "a memory book that is only occasionally arresting." However, Weiler praised Shirley Booth's performance: "Although Miss Booth appears to be mismated, she transcends the stereotyped situations by sensitive emoting and timing. While it is too much to expect her to make the story more brisk and sparkling, she does make 'Mrs. Leslie' appear genuinely alive and strong."
