= Marjie Millar =

American actress (1930–1966)

- Millar in Money From Home (1953)
- Born: Marjie Joy Miller; August 10, 1930; Tacoma, Washington, U.S.
- Died: April 16, 1966 (aged 35); San Diego, California, U.S.
- Education: Stephens College
- Occupation: Actress

Marjie Millar (born Marjie Joy Miller; August 10, 1930 – April 16, 1966) was an American television and film actress.

== Early years and education ==
Millar was born to George W. and Eunice Miller in Tacoma, Washington. Millar's father had changed his surname to "Miller", but she later returned to the original spelling. When she was 4 years old she won "a Shirley Temple look-alike contest". She attended Annie Wright Seminary, Washington Grammar School, and Mason Junior High School, and graduated in 1950 from Stadium High School in Tacoma. In 1949, she enrolled at Stephens College, an all-women's school in Columbia, Missouri, where she was a double major in radio/drama and psychology, graduating in 1951. (Another source says "a 1950 graduate of Stephens College".) As a student at Stephens, Millar was a member of the staff of the college's radio station, and she participated in theatrical productions. After she graduated from Stephens, she moved to Santa Monica. While she lived at home, she was active in productions of the Tacoma Little Theater.

== Early career ==
During World War II, she was named "Sweetheart of the 41st Division", having performed more than 7,000 hours singing for soldiers at nearby Ft. Lewis.

In 1946, she hosted a variety show for patients at Madigan Army Hospital at Ft. Lewis on the unique radio station for the hospital known as "Voice of Madigan".

Millar became a top model in Southern California by 1954, overcoming the doubts of the agency's head. After being signed by the Rita La Roy agency her pictures were seen in national advertisements in publications that included Life and Vogue magazines.

== Marriages ==
Millar was married four times: to University of Missouri college student James Sidney Rollins Jr. (1950–195?); to photographer and television director John Florea (1955–1958); to author and sportswriter John McCallum (1961–1963), whom she met when he was writing her biography, and to Lt. Commander Charles Candoo (USN).

== Career ==
She appeared in the television series Fireside Theatre, Dragnet (in 1956) and The Millionaire.

While working in Los Angeles, she reunited and lived with her roommate from Stephens College, Boni Ann Buehler. Millar later assisted Buehler during her recovery after two limbs were amputated by a boat propeller (Beuhler was represented by Melvin Belli in the famous civil suit against Conrad Hilton).

Millar was the female lead playing Dean Martin's love interest in the 1953 Martin and Lewis film Money from Home. She also had a major role in About Mrs. Leslie, a drama starring Shirley Booth and Robert Ryan as the romantic leads. It was not a success at the box office despite its prominent cast.

In the early 1960s, for a short time she was choreographer for the Tacoma instrumental rock group The Ventures.

== Injury and later life ==
Injuries sustained in a 1957 auto accident on Sunset Boulevard, Los Angeles, resulted in infection and gangrene of her left leg. After reporting to work on Dragnet she went back to her apartment but became too weak to lift the phone and was found by a neighbor who noticed several days' accumulation of milk bottles and newspapers. She was taken to a hospital and saved by massive blood transfusions after an appeal to the public for blood.

Millar's diagnosis was that she would never dance again and would walk with a limp. By June 1960 she had had 20 operations, most of which were "intricate plastic surgeries". She began teaching classes in dance drama, modeling, and song styling.

Her leg was not amputated, but she was forced to end her acting career. She divorced husband John Florea, and moved back to Tacoma, Washington, where she operated a dance school and later started a Puget Sound-area-produced television program with her third husband, author John McCallum. After marrying her fourth husband, a Lieutenant in the United States Navy, she followed him to his duty station in Southern California.

== Death ==
Millar died at Coronado Hospital in San Diego, California, in 1966 as a result of cirrhosis of the liver and chronic pancreatitis after enduring at least 14 surgeries on her injured leg.

== Filmography ==
Year	Title	Role	Notes
1953	Money from Home	Phyllis Leigh	
1954	About Mrs. Leslie	Nadine Roland	
1956	When Gangland Strikes	June Ellis	
