= Margaret Hope MacPherson =

Scottish crofter, politician, author and activist

Margaret MacPherson
- Born: Margaret Hope MacLean; 29 June 1908; Colinton, Edinburgh, Scotland
- Died: 21 October 2001 (aged 93); Portree, Isle of Skye, Scotland
- Education: University of Edinburgh
- Known for: Her activism in support of crofting

Margaret Hope MacPherson (born MacLean; 29 June 1908 – 21 October 2001) was a Scottish crofter, politician, author, and activist. During her later life, she was known as the "First Lady of Crofting".

== Early life ==
MacPherson was born Margaret Hope MacLean on 29 June 1908 in Colinton, Edinburgh, Scotland. Her father, Norman Maclean, was a minister of the Church of Scotland. When she was seven, her father was called to be minister of St Cuthbert's Church, Edinburgh. She had a comfortable, middle class upbringing due to her father's position. She stated in an interview in later life: "We were comfortably off, we had three servants, and it was a rich parish".

MacPherson was privately educated at a school in Edinburgh. She was also sent abroad to spend nine months at a school in Switzerland. She then studied at the University of Edinburgh. Her family owned a holiday house on the Isle of Skye, where she spent her childhood summers.

== Adult life ==
Upon graduating from the University of Edinburgh, she travelled to Glasgow and married Duncan MacPherson. Duncan was the son of crofters who lived up the road from the MacLean's holiday home on Skye. He was a seaman but returned to his family home during the harvest time. Their relationship first began when Margaret was a teenager. However, because Margaret had come from a well-to-do family and Duncan was working class, the couple felt the wrath of her parents. She later stated: "My father cut me off and never talked to me again for marrying beneath myself".

After their marriage in Glasgow, the couple moved to Skye. There, Duncan worked as a drover, moving cattle and sheep from the Isle of Skye to mainland Scotland to be sold. However, their first few years of marriage were spent in hardship. The Great Depression meant that there was little money to be made in droving. Margaret later recalled; "no matter how cheaply Duncan bought lambs or ewes on Skye, by the time he got them to the mainland the price had fallen". Eventually, they were able to lease 5000 acres on Skye from the Forestry Commission, and they spent the next ten years rearing cattle.

=== Political career ===
In 1945, MacPherson defeated Sir Godfrey Fell (a retired colonial official) to be elected to represent Portree on Inverness County Council. During her time as a local councillor, her politics changed and she moved from the Liberal Party to the Labour Party. She stepped down from the council in 1949.

MacPherson was active in her local Labour Party. From 1961 to 1984, she served as Secretary of the Skye Labour Party. She was part of a group known as the "Highland Luxemburgists" (that included Brian Wilson and Allan Campbell McLean), who attempted each year at the party conference to pass a resolution to bring the crofts back into common ownership. However, the Labour Party leadership ignored the resolution and supported right of crofters to purchase their land. In 1991, at the age of 83, she stopped canvassing door-to-door for the party at elections.

In 1951, MacPherson was appointed to the Commission of Enquiry into Crofting Conditions led by Sir Thomas Taylor (and therefore also known as the Taylor Commission). She argued for the nationalisation of all farms above 3,000 acres and against crofters being able to purchase their crofts, as she was a supporter of community ownership. The Commission published their report in 1954. This caused the establishment of the Crofters Commission (the statutory regulator for crofting in Scotland).

=== Author ===
From the 1960s, MacPherson wrote children's fiction books. They were inspired by Highland culture and Scottish history. Her initial attempts at publication were unsuccessful but her first book, The Shinty Boys, was eventually published in 1963. She had another six books published, including The Rough Road (1965), Ponies on Hire (1967), The New Tenants (1968), The Battle of the Braes (1970), and The Boy on the Roof (1972).

== Personal life ==
Margaret married Duncan MacPherson after she graduated from university. Together, they had seven sons.

On 21 October 2001, MacPherson died in Portree, Isle of Skye, Scotland. She was 93 years old. Her funeral was held at the Portree Parish Church on 24 October.
