= William Lyall Wilson =

Scottish Presbyterian minister (1866–1914)

William Lyall Wilson (1866–1914) was a minister of the Church of Scotland who worked in the Scots Mission Church in Argentina.

== Life ==
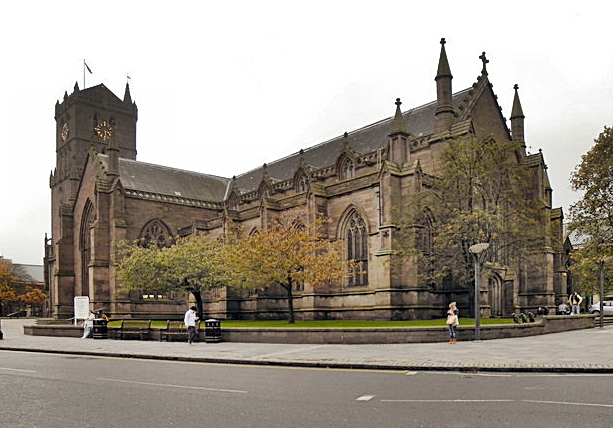
St Mary's in Dundee

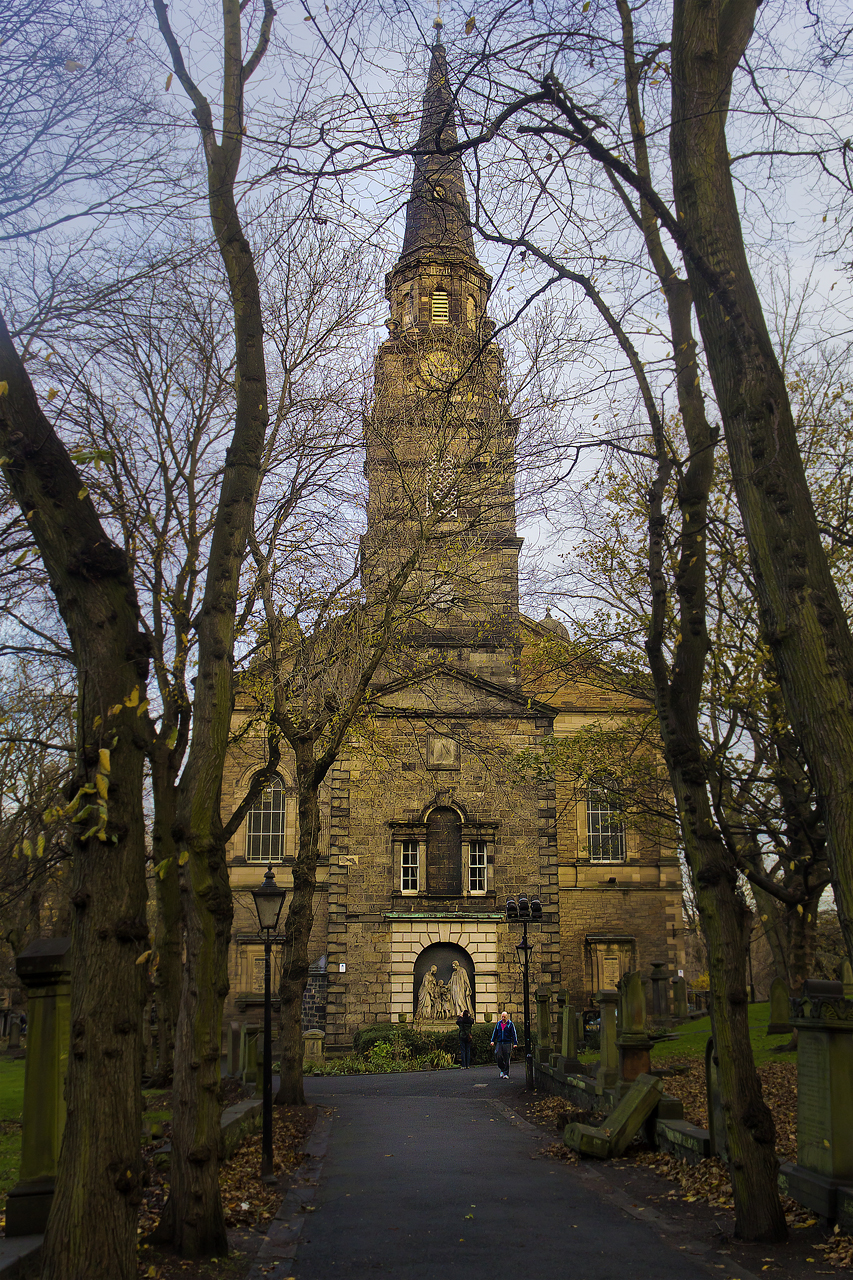
St Cuthbert's Church from the west

He was born in Dundee on 6 May 1866 the son of Amelia Swan and her husband, Thomas Wilson (1835-1909). He was educated at George Watson's College in Edinburgh then studied at the University of Edinburgh, graduating with an MA.

He was licensed to preach by the Presbytery of Edinburgh in 1892 but initially failed to find a post. Later in 1892 he replaced D. J. Moir Porteous of Port Glasgow as assistant in the Scots Church (St Andrews) in Buenos Aires in Argentina. He left this post in 1894 and returned to the UK.

In June 1895 he was ordained at Lesmahagow Parish Church. In June 1905 he translated to St Mary's Church in Dundee (one of the most prestigious charges in northern Scotland). In 1911 he translated to St Cuthbert's Church, Edinburgh in place of Rev Andrew Wallace Williamson, another prestigious charge.

He grew ill and went to the Isle of Wight to recover. He died there in Ventnor on 2 August 1914 and his body was returned to Edinburgh for burial in Grange Cemetery. He was buried with his father who had died in 1909. His position at St Cuthbert's was filled by Rev Norman Maclean.

== Family ==
In 1901 he married Margarita MacCulloch, daughter of James MacCulloch of Estanciero in Uruguay. They had a daughter Agnes Ruby Wilson (b.1902) and a son Thomas Leslie Lyall Wilson (1907-1945). Thomas was killed in World War II serving as a Major in the Gordon Highlanders.
