= When Gangland Strikes =

1956 film by R. G. Springsteen

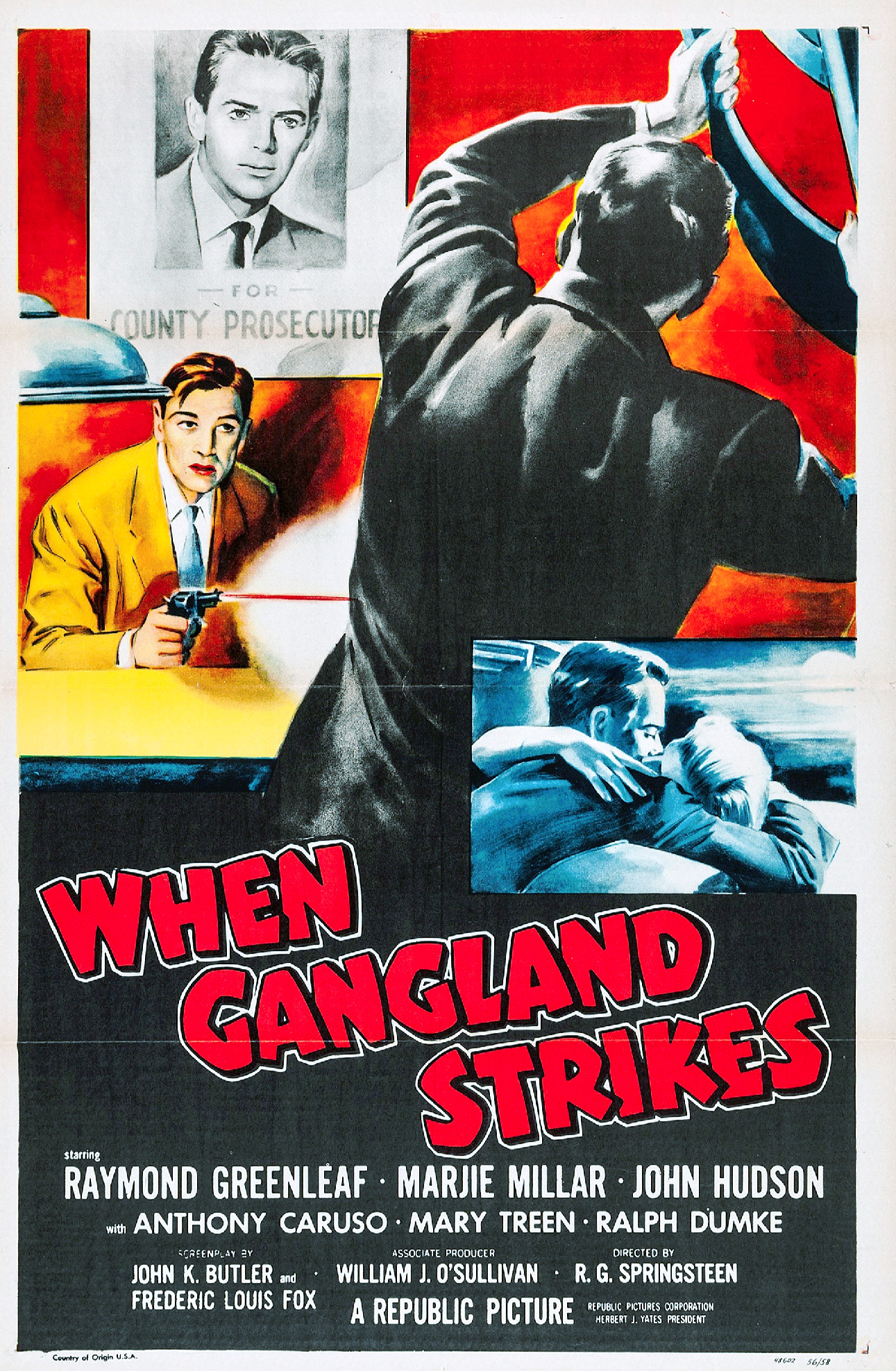
- Theatrical release poster
- Directed by: R. G. Springsteen
- Screenplay by: John K. Butler; Frederick Louis Fox
- Story by: John K. Butler; Frederick Louis Fox
- Produced by: William J. O'Sullivan
- Starring: Raymond Greenleaf; Marjie Millar; John Hudson; Anthony Caruso; Marian Carr; Slim Pickens; Mary Treen
- Cinematography: John L. Russell
- Edited by: Tony Martinelli
- Music by: Van Alexander
- Production company: Republic Pictures
- Distributed by: Republic Pictures
- Release date: March 15, 1956
- Running time: 70 minutes
- Country: United States
- Language: English

When Gangland Strikes is a 1956 American film noir crime film directed by R. G. Springsteen and written by John K. Butler and Frederick Louis Fox. The film stars Raymond Greenleaf, Marjie Millar, John Hudson, Anthony Caruso, Marian Carr, Slim Pickens and Mary Treen. The film was released on March 15, 1956 by Republic Pictures.

== Cast ==
- Raymond Greenleaf as Luke Ellis
- Marjie Millar as June Ellis
- John Hudson as Bob Keeler
- Anthony Caruso as Duke Martella
- Marian Carr as Hazel
- Slim Pickens as Slim Pickett
- Mary Treen as Emily Parsons
- Ralph Dumke as Walter Pritchard
- Morris Ankrum as Leo Fantzler
- Robert Emmett Keane as Judge George Walters
- Addison Richards as Mark Spurlock
- John Gallaudet as Charles Clark
- Paul Birch as Sheriff Mack McBride
- Richard Deacon as Dixon Bracket
