= Silverknowes =

Suburb of Edinburgh, Scotland

Coordinates: 55°58′10.19″N 3°16′13.78″W

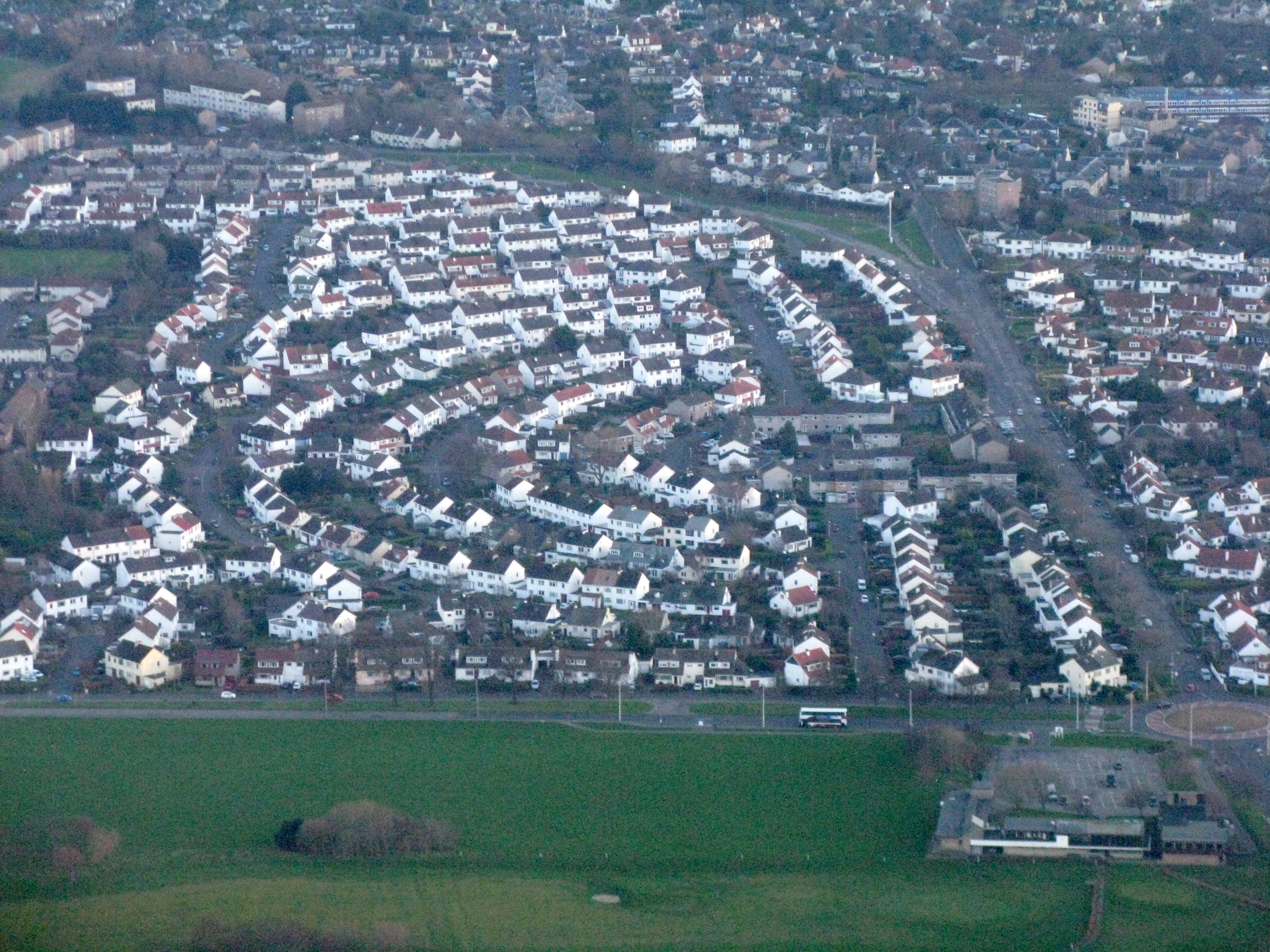
Aerial view of Silverknowes

Silverknowes /ˌsɪlvərˈnaʊz/ is a district of Edinburgh, Scotland, lying to the northwest of the city. The district contains over 2000 homes, ranging in size from bungalow to semi-detached housing, much of it built during the mid-twentieth century.

== Location ==
Silverknowes is located in the north west of Edinburgh, on the shores of the Firth of Forth. It lies approximately 5 kilometres (3 miles) from the city centre. The district is bounded by Cramond to the north and west, Barnton and Lauriston to the west, Davidson's Mains to the southwest, Blackhall to the south, Muirhouse to the east, and the Firth of Forth to the north.

Silverknowes lies within the boundaries of the Almond local government ward (Ward 1), the Edinburgh West parliamentary constituency (UK parliament) and the Edinburgh Western parliamentary constituency (Scottish parliament). It is part of the area covered by the Davidson's Mains & Silverknowes Association and the Silverknowes Community Council.

== History ==
Until the 1930s, the Silverknowes area was open farmland. It was previously part of the Lauriston Estate, and was known as Randalston (spelled as Randalistoun on some maps), that name dating back to at least the 14th century.

In 1934, most of the land was acquired by McTaggart & Mickel, a Glasgow-based firm of tenement builders. In 1936, the firm started building houses to the west of the existing Silverknowes Road, creating Silverknowes Avenue, Crescent, Drive, Hill (formerly Circus), Loan and Terrace. The work was interrupted by World War II, but resumed in 1952 with the development of Silverknowes Bank, Brae, Court, Eastway, Gardens, Grove, Parkway and Place, these all being to the east of Silverknowes Road. Most of these roads form a series of concentric semi-circles on either side of Silverknowes Road. In 1960, Silverknowes Green, Midway, Southway and View were built on part of the former Drylaw Estate to the south.

The development was originally a mixture of private and council housing, but is now mainly owner-occupied, most of the council houses having been purchased by their tenants under the Right to Buy legislation of the 1980s.

In the early 1930s, Edinburgh Corporation started developing the Silverknowes Esplanade, a 3.2 kilometres (2.0 mi) walkway running from Cramond along the south shore of the Firth of Forth to Granton. The work was completed in 1947, at which point the construction of a parallel motor road, Marine Drive, was begun. The scheme originally included plans for a paddling pool, open-air swimming pool and model yacht basin, but these were never realised.

=== Caledonian Railway ===
In 1894, the Caledonian Railway opened a branch line from Craigleith to Barnton via Davidson's Mains, running through the south of Silverknowes. The line closed to passengers in 1951 and to goods traffic in 1960. The surviving trackbed is now a footpath and cycle path, forming part of the National Cycle Network Route 1.

=== Anti-aircraft measures ===
During World War II, Silverknowes was the site of a heavy anti-aircraft battery, situated on the north side of Silverknowes Golf Course. A Starfish anti-aircraft decoy was located 700 metres (770 yd) to the west, at the west end of Marine Drive. This consisted of a group of 'fire-burning' boxes, designed to appear from the air as a burning town or city, thus diverting enemy aircraft from their intended targets.

== Amenities ==
To the west of Silverknowes is Lauriston Castle and estate.

Lauriston Farm was used for farming purposes until the 1970s, when the Ross family introduced a market garden, then an eatery. The Robertson family turned it into a restaurant, selling out to Whitbread in the late 1980s, with it becoming a Whitbread Brewer's Fayre In 1993. It was relaunched as a Toby Carvery in 2019. The farmland returned to productive agricultural use in 2021 with the establishment of Lauriston Agroecology Farm providing market gardening, orchards and community growing space.

Open farmland lies to the north. Silverknowes Beach and Promenade stretch three miles (five kilometres) from Granton in the east to Cramond in the west, along the banks of the Firth of Forth. The Boardwalk Beach Club café lies about half-way along. The beach is tidal and overlooks Cramond Island.

To the east side of Silverknowes Road lies the Silverknowes Golf Club and 18 hole golf course, operated by Edinburgh Leisure. The clubhouse and sports pavilion, designed by Alan Reiach & Partners, was built in 1964 and the course stretches to the beach.

== Education ==
Most of the neighbourhood lies in the catchment area for Davidson's Mains Primary School and the Royal High School in Barnton, the 28th oldest school in the world, dating back to 1128.

After the merger of Silverknowes Primary with Muirhouse Primary, the former's land was developed as housing, and now has the address of Silverknowes Eastway. This area falls within the catchments of Craigroyston Primary and Craigroyston Community High School.

== Transport links ==
The following Lothian Buses link Silverknowes to Edinburgh city centre and beyond:

Operator	Service	Destination	Daytime interval
Lothian	16	Torphin	12 min
Lothian	27	Hunter's Tryst	15 min
Lothian	29	Gorebridge	20 min
Lothian	37	Penicuik	15 min

== Boundary change ==
In 2006, there were plans to place Silverknowes in the new "Forth" local authority voting ward. This outraged residents, who felt it would lead to the breakup of Davidson's Mains as a community. Over 600 objections were sent by members of the community and various local establishments, and Silverknowes became part of "Almond" ward alongside Davidson's Mains, Barnton and Cramond. The area is served by the Davidson's Mains and Silverknowes Association and four City of Edinburgh Councillors, MSP for Edinburgh West and MP for Edinburgh West.
