= McCollum =

McCollum may refer to:

- McCollum (surname), includes a list of people with the name
- McCollum, Alabama, U.S., unincorporated community
- McCollum Field, air field in Cobb County, Georgia, U.S.
- McCollum High School, high school in San Antonio, Texas, U.S.
- McCollum Hall, residence hall at the University of Kansas
- McCollum, Michigan, a ghost town
