= Safety pin =

Variation of regular pin used to fasten piece of clothes and textile

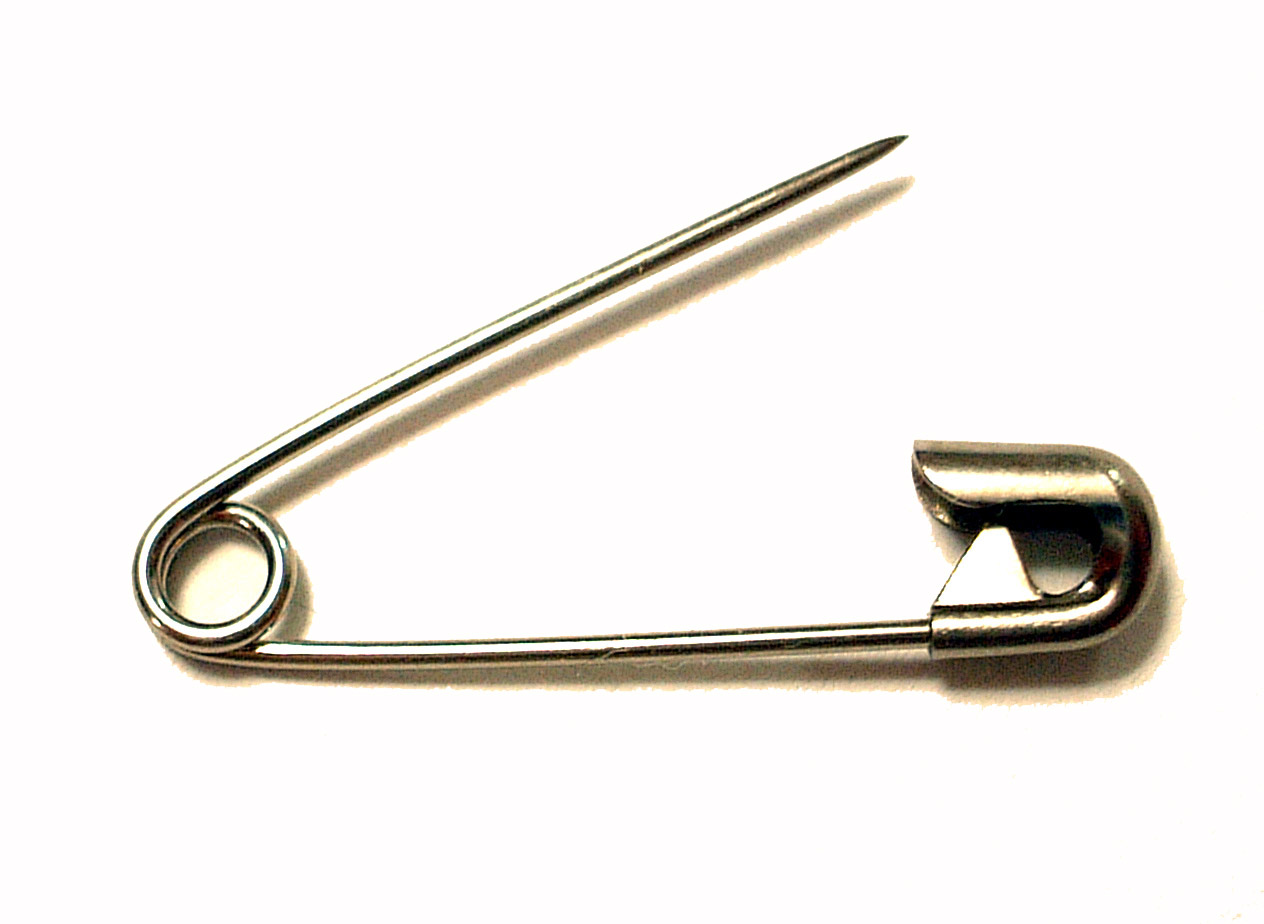
A safety pin.

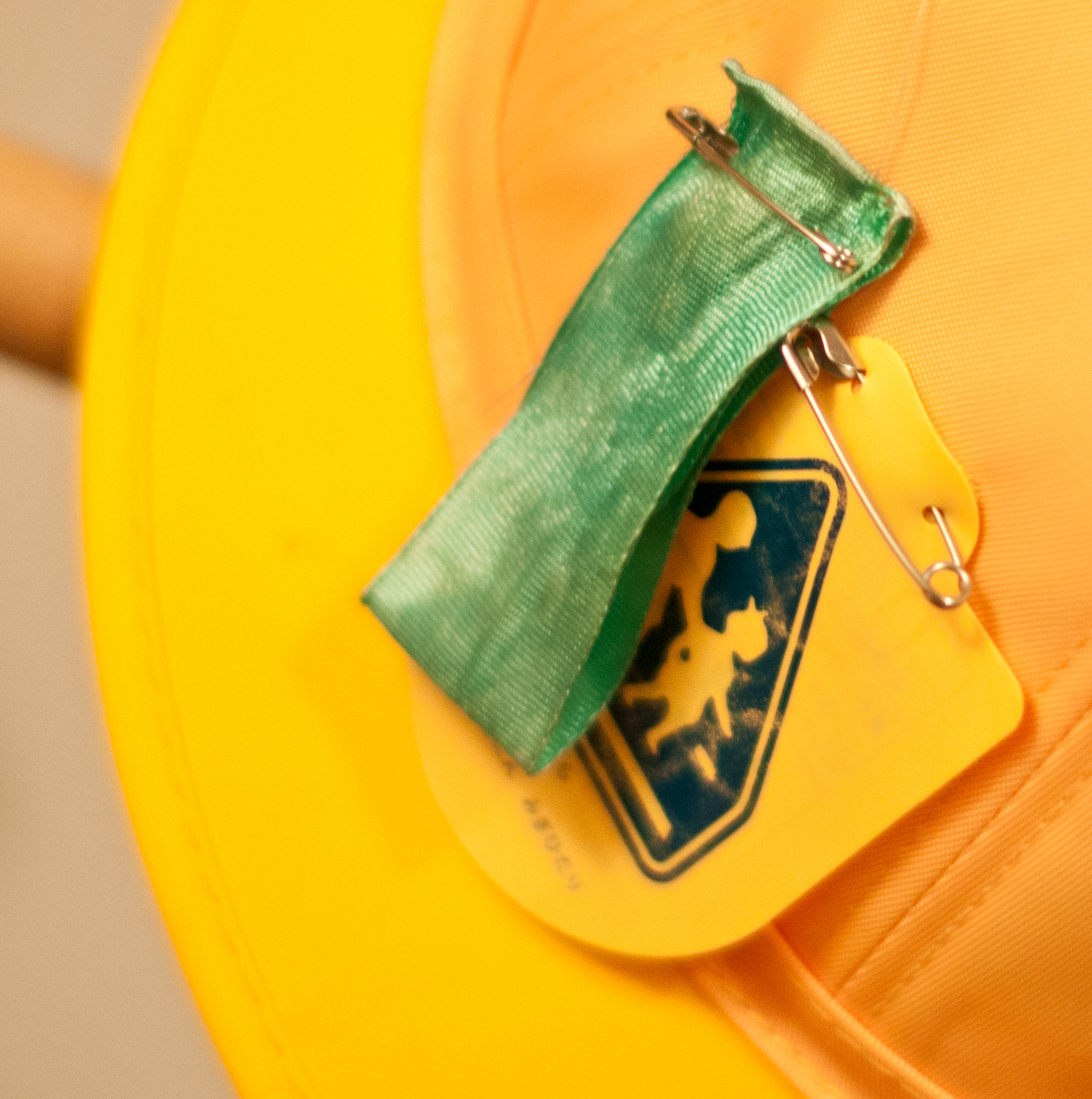
A ribbon and badge attached to a school cap with safety pins

A safety pin is a variation of the regular pin which includes a simple spring mechanism and a clasp. The clasp forms a closed loop to properly fasten the pin to whatever it is applied to and covers the end of the pin to protect the user from the sharp point.

Safety pins are commonly used to fasten pieces of fabric or clothing together. Safety pins, or more usually a special version with an extra safe cover, called a nappy pin or loincloth pin, are widely used to fasten cloth diapers (nappies), or modern loincloths. They're preferred as their safety clasp, while remaining an ingestion hazard, prevents the baby from being jabbed or pricked. Safety pins can be used generally to patch torn or damaged clothing. They can also be used as an accessory in all kinds of jewelry including: earrings, chains, and wristbands. Sometimes they're used to attach an embroidered patch. Safety pins are divided into numbered size categories. Size 3 pins are often used in quilting and may be labelled for purchase as a "quilting pin." Sizes 4 and larger may be called "blanket pins" and deemed acceptable as kilt pins for informal dress, depending upon design and appearance.

== Early precursor ==
The toggle pin, an early clothing fastener, was brought to Palestine by the Hyksos. The toggle pin was a pin characterized by an eyelet in one end; the eyelet was probably used to secure one end of the pin to the article of clothing, with the other end penetrating another portion of the article to secure it.

The fibula, a form of brooch, was invented by the Mycenaeans in the Greek region of Peloponnesus between the 14th and 13th Century BC, and is considered an early precursor to a safety pin since it was used in a similar manner. Fibulae were used by Greek women and men to help secure tunics.

== Invention of the safety pin ==
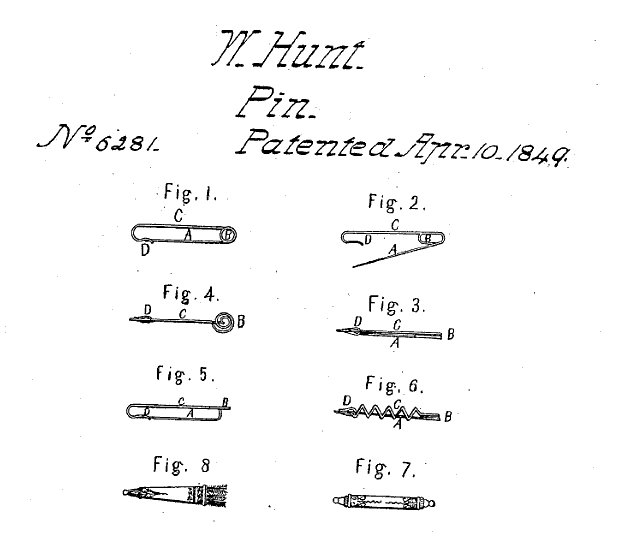
Hunt's 1849 patent on the safety pin, U.S. patent #6,281

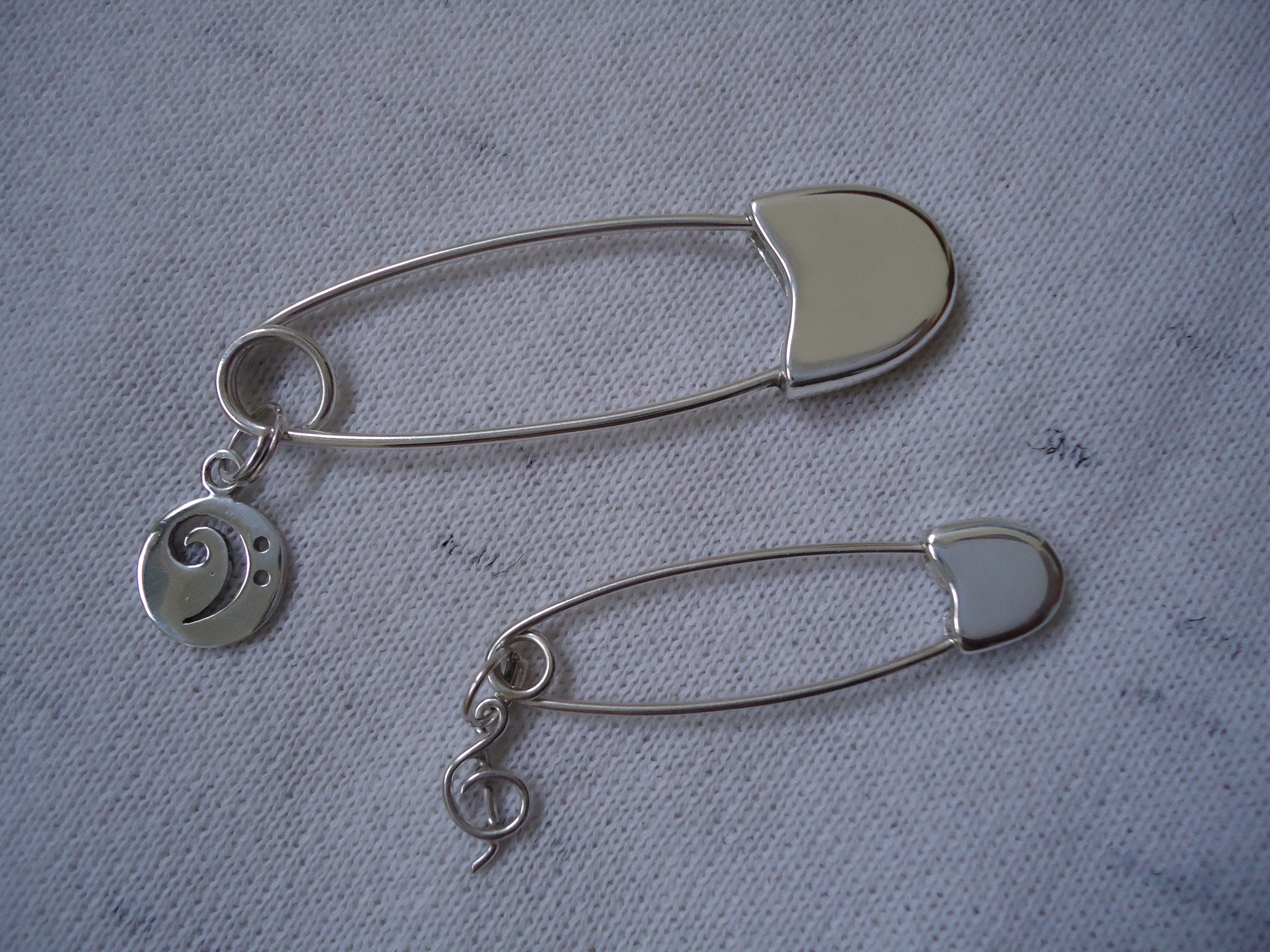
Silver safety pins

American mechanic Walter Hunt is regarded as the inventor of the modern safety pin. The safety pin included a clasp that covered the point and kept it from opening, and a circular twist at the bend to act as a spring and hold it in place. Charles Rowley (Birmingham, England) independently patented a similar safety pin in October 1849, though they are no longer made.

Hunt made the invention in order to pay off a $15 debt to a friend. He used a piece of brass wire that was about 8 inches (200 mm) long and made a coil in the center of the wire so it would open up when released. The clasp at one end was devised in order to shield the sharp edge from the user.

After being issued U.S. patent #6,281 on April 10, 1849, Hunt sold the patent to W.R. Grace and Company for $400 (roughly $15,000 in 2025 dollars). Using that money, Hunt then paid the $15 owed to a friend and kept the remaining amount of $385 for himself. In the years to follow, W.R. Grace and Company would make millions of dollars in profits from his invention.

== Locking safety pin ==
The sharpened pin, that is attached to a coiled wire is connected with a cap that is hooked at the end of the wire. Pushing the pin into the opening of the cap secures the safety of the pin, and the clasp is then closed.

== Medical aspects ==
The laryngologist Dr. Chevalier Jackson devised special instruments for removing swallowed safety pins. Because small children often swallowed them and open pins could be lodged dangerously in their throats, Jackson called them "danger pins" and sometimes displayed arrangements of those he had extracted. Safety pin ingestion is still a common problem in some countries.

== Culture ==
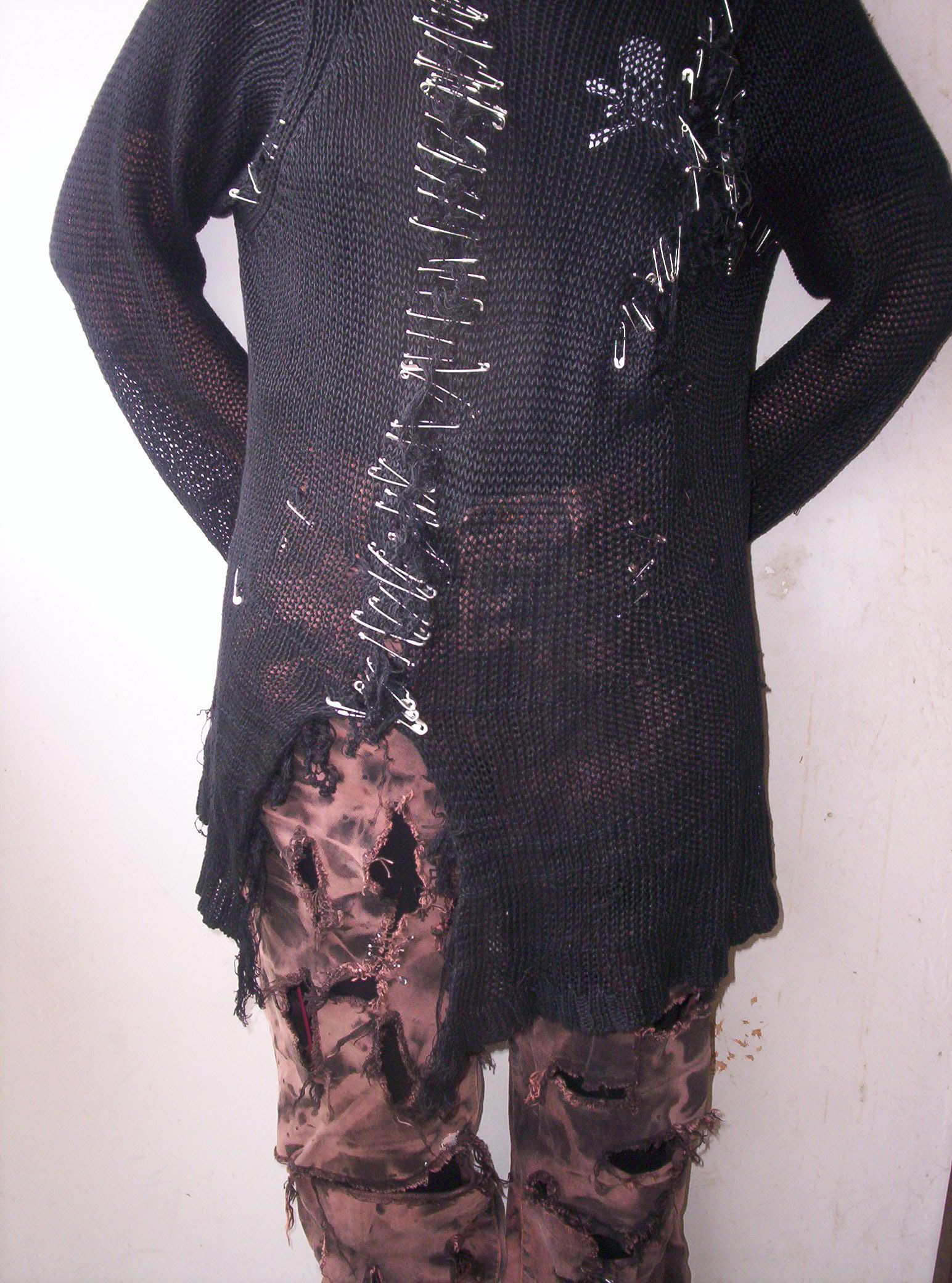
Punk-style clothing held together with safety pins

During the emergence of punk rock in the late 1970s, safety pins became associated with the genre, its followers and fashion. Some claim the look was taken originally from Richard Hell whom the British punks saw in pictures, and whose style they adopted. This is disputed by a number of artists from the first wave of British punks, most notably Johnny Rotten, who insists that safety pins were originally incorporated for more practical reasons, for example, to remedy "the arse of your pants falling out." British punk fans, after seeing the clothing worn by such punk forerunners, then incorporated safety pins into their own wardrobe as clothing decoration or as piercings, thus shifting the purpose of the pins from practicality to fashion. The safety pin subsequently has become an image associated with punk rock by media and popular culture outlets.

Safety pins worn visibly on clothing became a symbol of solidarity with victims of racist and xenophobic speech and violence after the Brexit referendum in the United Kingdom in 2016. Later that year the symbol spread to the United States after Donald Trump's election to the presidency. Some commentators and activists derided the wearing of safety pins as "slacktivism," while others argued it was useful when connected with other, more concrete political actions.

== Tradition ==
Safety pins hold a value in certain cultures and traditions. In India pins are kept over generations and passed down to daughters. Ukrainians use pins as a way to ward off evil spirits when attached to children's clothing. In other countries a safety pin is a form of good luck.

== See also ==
- Drawing pin
- Infant clothing
- Fibulae and ancient brooches
- Black Versace dress of Elizabeth Hurley (1994 Academy Award Red Carpet dress held together by safety pins)
- Paper clip
- Tie pin
