= McCallum =

McCallum may refer to:

== Places ==
- McCallum, Newfoundland and Labrador, Canada
- McCallum Pass, a pass between the northeast ridge of Mount Mangin and the ridge on the south side of Stonehouse Bay, in the southern part of Adelaide Island, Antarctica
- McCallum Settlement, Nova Scotia, Canada
- McCallum Street, Chinatown, Singapore

== Buildings ==
- McCallum Adobe Museum, Palm Springs, California
- McCallum High School, public high school in Austin, Texas
- McCallum Manor, historic apartment building located in the Mount Airy neighborhood of Philadelphia, Pennsylvania
- McCallum Theatre, theatre and concert venue on the campus of College of the Desert in Palm Desert, California

== People ==
- McCallum (surname), for list of people whose surname is McCallum

== Film and television ==
- McCallum (TV series), Scottish TV series broadcast from 1995 to 1998

== Others ==
- McCallum Brothers, Auckland, New Zealand-based sand and construction aggregate supplier
- McCallum rule, monetary policy, specifying a target for the monetary base (M0) which could be used by a central bank

== See also ==
- Macallum, a surname
- McCollum (disambiguation)
