= John Florea =

American film director

John Florea (born in Alliance, Ohio on May 28, 1916; died in Las Vegas on August 25, 2000) was an American television director and a photographer.

== Career ==
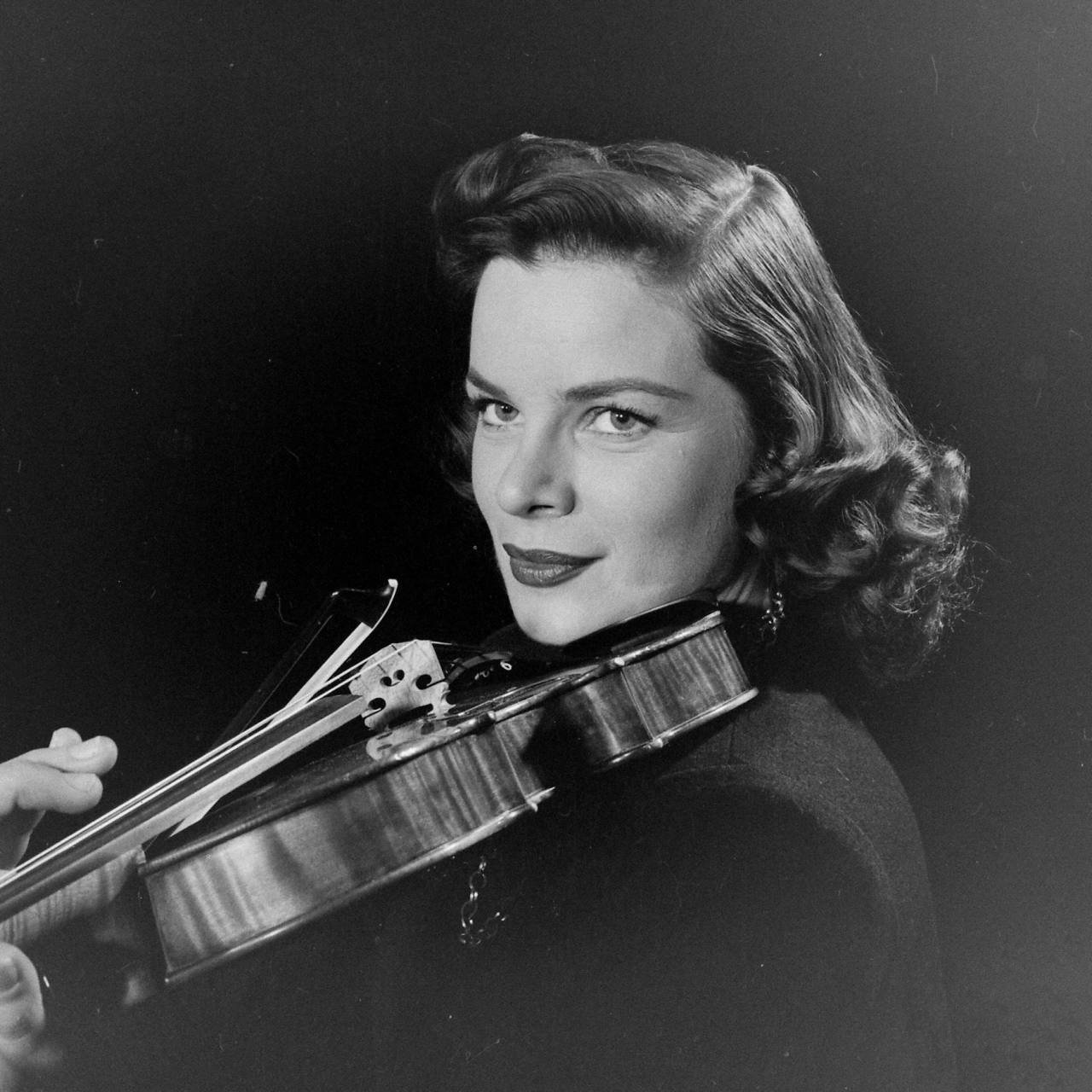
Photograph of Marcia Van Dyke taken by John Florea in 1947

Florea started as a photographer for the San Francisco Examiner, then was signed onto the staff of LIFE in 1941, living in Hollywood and specializing in celebrity portraits of actresses, such as Marilyn Monroe and Jane Russell.

After the bombing of Pearl Harbor which led to U.S. involvement in World War II he joined America's first war correspondents for the Pacific war, where he covered the Marines and the Navy, especially during the Battle of Tarawa in December 1943, and from 1944 until the end of the war, he followed the American army in French and Belgian campaigns, documenting the bombing of German cities and liberation of inmates of Nordhausen Nazi concentration camp. A picture of his of an emaciated American POW was given exposure throughout the US, and his photograph "Read My Vote", made in Japan in 1947, was included by Edward Steichen in his world-touring The Family of Man exhibition.

After the war, Florea returned to Hollywood to continue to photograph celebrities, leaving LIFE in 1949. Portraits of movie stars he made in colour in the 1950s were part of an exhibition "Masters of Starlight: Photographers in Hollywood" in 1988 at the LACMA, Los Angeles. He later became producer, director, and writer for more than 130 TV shows from the mid-1960s to the mid-1980s, known for his direction of episodes of Sea Hunt, The Virginian CHiPs, and the paranormal thriller Invisible Strangler.

== Personal life ==
He was born to Romanian immigrants. Married to Evelyn Barnes From 1939 to 1954. Children Gwendolyn Florea, Melanie Florea, Johnny Florea. Grandchildren, Sean Florea, Shelly Brown. Great grandchildren: Aundrea Brown, Alayna Brown, Dylan Brown. From 1955 to 1958 he was married to actress Marjie Millar. He also had a turbulent third marriage (1968-1971) with Shirley Damery, who allegedly stabbed him in the back with a small knife following an alimony hearing in 1975. Florea sued her for $1.25 million and she in turn sued him for the same amount, alleging he had circulated to her close friends and showbiz acquaintances a copy of her arrest record and mug shot from a 1955 prostitution arrest with the intent of humiliating her. He was last married to Ruth Johnson at the time of his death.
