= McCollum (surname) =

McCollum is an Irish and Scottish surname. The earliest mention of the name dates back to 1171 as "Mac Gil Colum" in the Prior of Ardstraw in County Tyrone in the census under Rory O'Connor. Petty's Census in 1659 listed McCollum as one of the principal Native Irish names in County Antrim, whilst it was also found in Tyrone and Donegal. Archaic forms of the name include "MacElholm" and "MacGillacolum".

Beginning in 1624 there was a migration of Catholic Gaelic Highlanders from the Scottish areas of Kintyre to the neighbouring Glens of Antrim whilst fleeing persecution for their religion in Scotland, the family name McCollum is recorded in this migration.

Notable people with the surname include:

- Allan McCollum (born 1944), American artist
- Anquell McCollum (born 1973), American college basketball coach
- Betty L. McCollum (born 1954), Minnesota Representative
- Bill McCollum (born 1944), American politician
- CJ McCollum (born 1991), American basketball player
- Darius McCollum (born 1965), American transit operator impostor
- Derrick McCollum, American politician
- Elmer McCollum (1879–1967), American biochemist and historian
- Parker McCollum (born 1992), American Americana and country singer-songwriter
- Miles Parks McCollum or Lil Yachty (born 1997), American rapper
- Nate McCollum (born 2001), American football player
- Rick McCollum, musician
- Robert McCollum, American voice actor
- Robert W. McCollum (1925–2010), American virologist and epidemiologist
- Ronnie McCollum (born 1978), American professional basketball player
- Ryan McCollum (born 1998), American football player
- Tristin McCollum (born 1999), American football player
- Vashti McCollum (1912–2006), plaintiff in landmark U.S. Supreme Court case involving separation of church and state
- Zyon McCollum (born 1999), American football player

== See also ==
- McCallum (surname)
