= Torphin =

Area of Edinburgh, Scotland

Coordinates: 55°53′54″N 3°16′34″W

Torphin (/tɔːrˈfɪn/ tor-FIN) is a small area in the south-west of Edinburgh, Scotland, with its name deriving from the nearby Torphin Hill. It lies just south of Juniper Green, on the opposite side of the Water of Leith, and sits both east and west of the Edinburgh City Bypass: the east side mostly comprises new-build houses; the west side is largely rural, sporting a small number of mid-20th Century bungalows and one of the city's many golf courses, Torphin Hill Golf Club.

== Etymology ==
Torphin Hill itself, is the origin of the name of the suburb of Torphin, adjoins Warklaw Hill to the south-west. Its name comes from the Scottish Gaelic tòrr fionn, which means "white tor" in contrast to the nearby Torduff, which represents tòrr dubh, meaning black tor. It may or may not share a common origin with the last part of the Edinburgh name Corstorphine.

== History ==
The northern slope of Warklaw Hill has been extensively quarried in the past for its igneous rocks. Now disused, it is now part-occupied by Colinton Community Compost, and is sometimes known as Torphin Quarry.

The hill also gave its name to Torphin Hill Golf Club, which celebrated its centenary in 1995. The golf course, which actually lay on the southern slopes of Corby Hill and the eastern slope of Warklaw Hill, offered views over the city of Edinburgh and beyond. The club closed down at the start of 2014 after a prolonged decline in membership numbers.

== Transport links ==
Lothian Buses links the area to the city centre with the number 16 bus service. Further services can be reached on the nearby Lanark Road to the north, or at Colinton to the north-east.
