= Loudon MacQueen Douglas =

Loudon MacQueen Douglas FRSE (1863–1944) was an engineer, author, antiquarian, dairy expert and pig-breeder. He was co-founder of William Douglas Ltd of Edinburgh (1888) and London (1890).

He was born in Colinton, south-west of Edinburgh in 1863, the son of William Douglas and Marion Hunter.

In 1910 he was elected a Fellow of the Royal Society of Edinburgh. His proposers were Gerald Rowley Leighton, Robert Wallace, James Macdonald, and R Stewart MacDougall.

He served as President of the Scottish Society in 1914.

He died on 27 January 1944.

== Publications ==
- Manual of the Pork Trade (1893)
- Pigs: Breeds and Management (1897). Fourth Edition (1905) at the Internet Archive
- Douglas's Receipt Book for the Bacon, Pork, and Meat Trades (189?)
- Refrigeration in the Dairy (1904)
- The Origins and Development of the Meat Trade (1907)
- The Meat Industry and Meat Inspections (1910)
- The Bacillus of Long Life: A Manual for the Preparation and Souring of Milk for Dietary Purposes (1911) (an early recognition of the health-giving properties of yoghurt)
- The Kilt: A Manual of Scottish National Dress (1914)
