= Don McCallum =

Canadian art critic

Don McCallum was an artist, historian, and art critic for the Kingston Whig-Standard in Ontario.
