= Neil McCallum =

Neil McCallum may refer to:

- Neil McCallum (actor), Canadian-British actor
- Neil McCallum (cricketer) Scottish cricketer
- Neil McCallum (footballer, born 1868) (died 1920), Scottish international footballer
- Neil McCallum (footballer, born 1987), Scottish footballer (St. Johnstone)
