= John McCallum (sports writer) =

American sportswriter

- Born: June 27, 1924; Tacoma, Washington, U.S.
- Died: December 17, 1988 (aged 64)
- Education: Washington State College
- Spouse: Marjie Millar (1961-1964; divorced)

John Dennis McCallum (June 27, 1924 – December 17, 1988) was an American sportswriter and author.

== Personal life ==
McCallum was born on June 27, 1924, in Tacoma, Washington, to George A. and Mildred (née Tiedeman) McCallum. He enrolled at Washington State University (then Washington State College) in 1942, but completed only one year before enlisting in the United States Army, serving from 1943 to 1945 in mountain infantry and tank destroyer units. Upon returning home, he resumed his studies and graduated in 1947. After a brief stint in professional baseball, playing for the Portland Beavers, McCallum moved to New York City, where he began his sportswriting career. In 1961, he married television and movie actress Marjie Millar having met her while writing a book about her but the marriage lasted only a few years. Millar later remarried. She died in 1966 at the age of 35.

McCallum died on December 17, 1988, from cardiac arrest at the age of 64. He had long suffered from diabetes and progressive heart disease.

== Literary career ==
In the April 1945 issue of Washington State Alumni Powwow publication, McCallum is identified as a member of the WSC Class of 1946 and the publication's sports editor. In that issue, McCallum has a "Johnny McCallum" byline on a story headlined "Clips from the Sports Log." The November 1945 issue of Powwow lists him as sports editor, but does not include a class year. McCallum's student activities included being a member of the WSU Cougar varsity baseball team, coached by Buck Bailey. McCallum graduated from Washington State College in 1947.

After graduation, he worked on several newspapers, including the Tacoma News Tribune, Tacoma Times, The Oregonian and the Spokane Daily Chronicle. He moved to New York City in 1947 and eventually served as assistant sports editor of the Newspaper Enterprise Association from 1950 to 1954. From 1954 to 1958 he worked as director of the Premium Book Division of A.S. Barnes & Co.

As a sportswriter, McCallum wrote books on a variety of topics. One of his most famous works is The Tiger Wore Spikes, a biography of baseball Hall of Famer Ty Cobb. The John D. McCallum Memorial Scholarship in Communication at Washington State University was established in his memory by his brother George "Pat" McCallum.

== Works ==
- This Was Football (1954)
- The Tiger Wore Spikes: An Informal Biography of Ty Cobb (1956)
- That Kelly Family (1957)
- The Coit Fishing Pole Club Beginners Book of Fishing (1958)
- Six Roads From Abilene: Some Personal Recollections of Edgar Eisenhower (1960)
- Scooper: Authorized Story of Scoop Conlon's Motion Picture World (1960)
- Port Angeles, U.S.A. (1961)
- Everest Diary (1966)
- Going Their Way (1969) autobiography
- College Football, U.S.A. (1971)
- The Story of Dan Lyons, S.J. (1973)
- The Gladiators (1974)
- The World Heavyweight Boxing Championship (1974)
- The Encyclopedia of Boxing Champions, 1882-1975 (1975)
- Ty Cobb (1975)
- We Remember Rockne (1975)
- Big Ten Football: Since 1895 (1976)
- Ivy League Football: Since 1872 (1977)
- College Basketball, U.S.A. (1978)
- Dave Beck (1978)
- Getting Into Pro Football (1979)
- Southeastern Conference Football (1980)

== Bibliography ==
- Contemporary Authors, New Revision Series, Vol. 4. Gale Research Co. 1981. ISBN 0-8103-1933-0
- Contemporary Authors, Vol. 127. Gale Research, Inc. 1989. ISBN 0-8103-1952-7
- McCallum, John D. (1969). Going Their Way. Chilton Book Company.
