= John Donaldson McCallum =

Scottish minister (1856–1930)

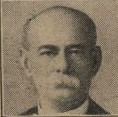
- photo of John Donaldson McCallum, from a 1926 publication
- Born: 1856; Tarbolton
- Died: October 1930 (aged 73–74)

John Donaldson McCallum (1856 – 1930) was a Scottish minister who served as Moderator of the General Assembly of the Church of Scotland in 1926.

== Life ==
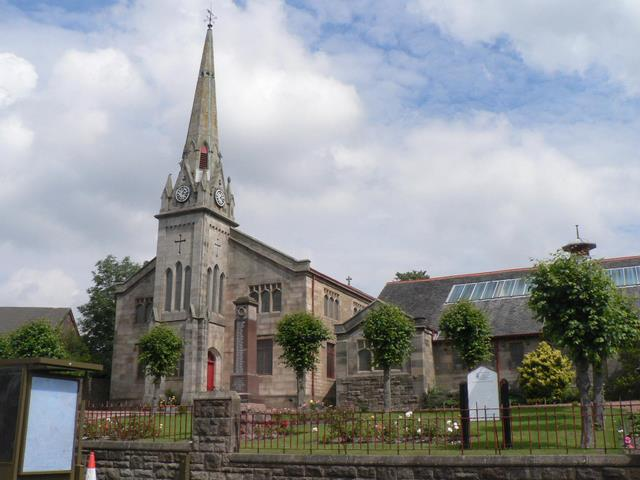
Larkhall parish church

Born in 1856, at Tarbolton,

He studied divinity at Glasgow University graduating MA in 1881 and BD in 1884.

He was minister of Larkhall from at least 1896 to 1926.

He died in October 1930, aged 74.

== Family ==
He was married to Mary Gordon Donald (d.1954).
