= Lizars =

The name Lizars is best known as a family of artists and engravers of Scottish origin:

- Daniel Lizars Sr. (1754–1812), engraver and editor, father of:
  - John Lizars (c.1787–1860), Professor of Surgery at the Royal College of Surgeons,
  - William Home Lizars (1788–1859), engraver, artist, and editor
  - Daniel Lizars (1793–1875), his son, engraver and editor.
