= Daniel Lizars Sr. =

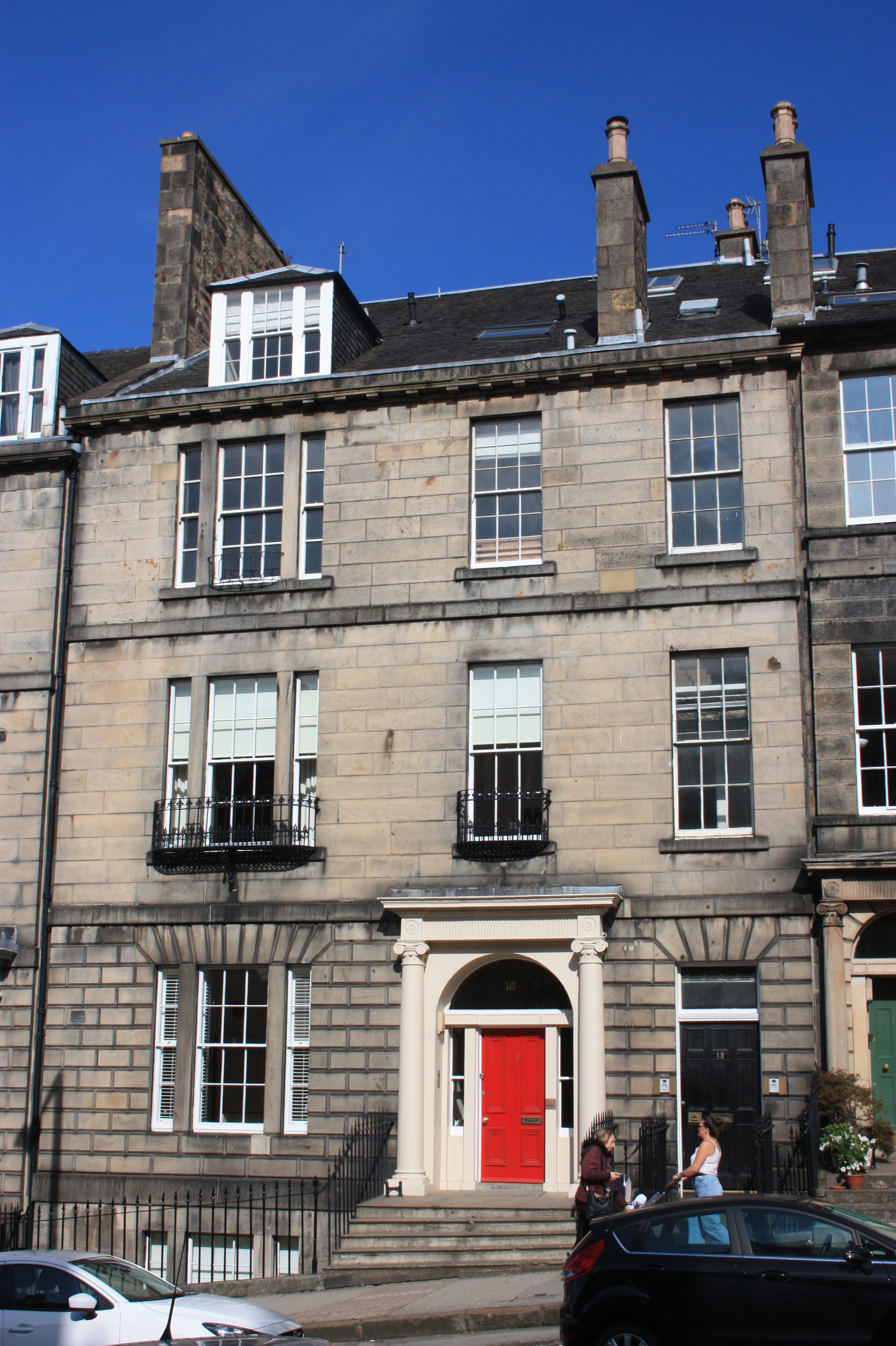
13 Dublin Street, Edinburgh

Daniel Lizars (1754–1812) was an 18th-century Scottish engraver, map-maker and publisher. He was patriarch to the famous Lizars family. He is remembered for his views of Edinburgh.

== Life ==
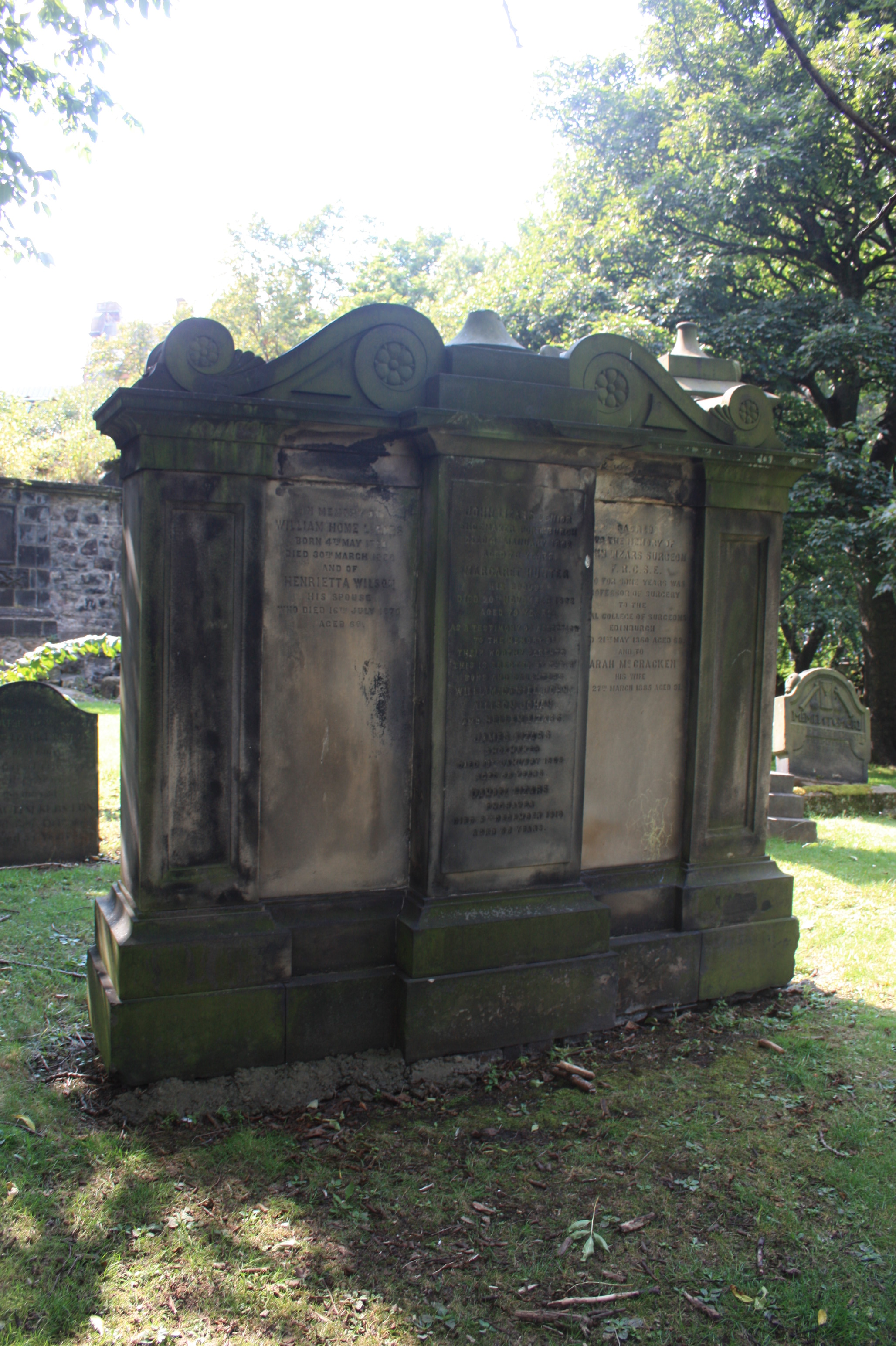
The Lizars grave, St Cuthberts, Edinburgh

He was born in Portsburgh, off the Grassmarket in south-west Edinburgh in 1754, the second son of James Lizars, a shoemaker. His brother John Lizars continued the family business as a shoemaker.

He was apprenticed for nine years as a printer and engraver to Andrew Bell. He set up a printworks at the Backstairs on Parliament Close, near to St Giles Cathedral.

In 1798 he apprenticed George Bartholmew, father of the map-making company John Bartholomew and Son Ltd.

He lived his final years at 7 Duke Street in Edinburgh's New Town. The street was renamed Dublin Street in 1922 and also renumbered. The house is now 13 Dublin Street.

He died on 8 December 1812. He is buried in St Cuthberts Churchyard at the west end of Princes Street Gardens in central Edinburgh. The grave lies on the raised ground immediately south-west of the church.

His premises was burnt down in the Great Fire of Edinburgh in 1824.

== Family ==
He married Margaret Home.

His children included Daniel Lizars, John Lizars, William Home Lizars and Jane Home Lizars, who later married Sir William Jardine.
