= John Syme =

Scottish portrait-painter (1795–1861)

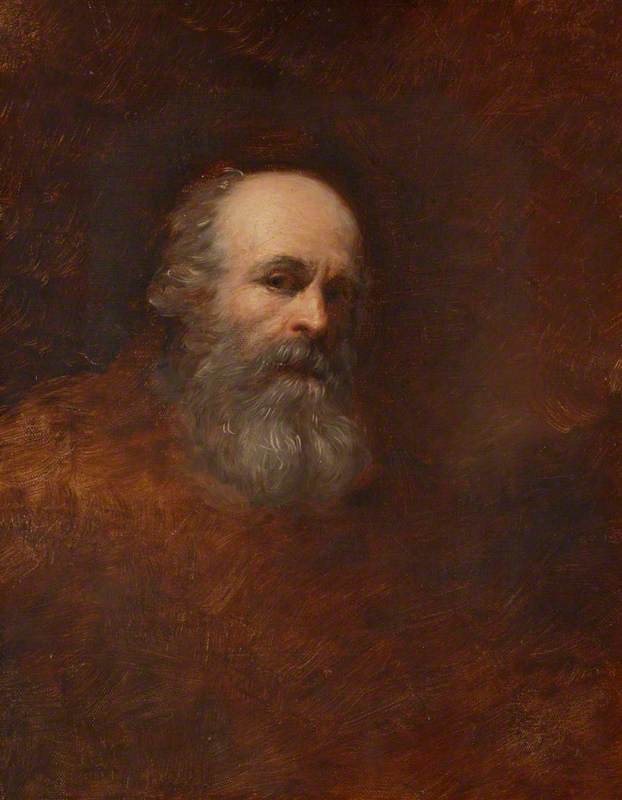
- Self-portrait
- Born: 17 January 1795; Edinburgh, Scotland
- Died: 3 August 1861 (aged 66); Edinburgh, Scotland

John Syme RSA (17 January 1795 – 3 August 1861) was a Scottish portrait painter.

== Life ==
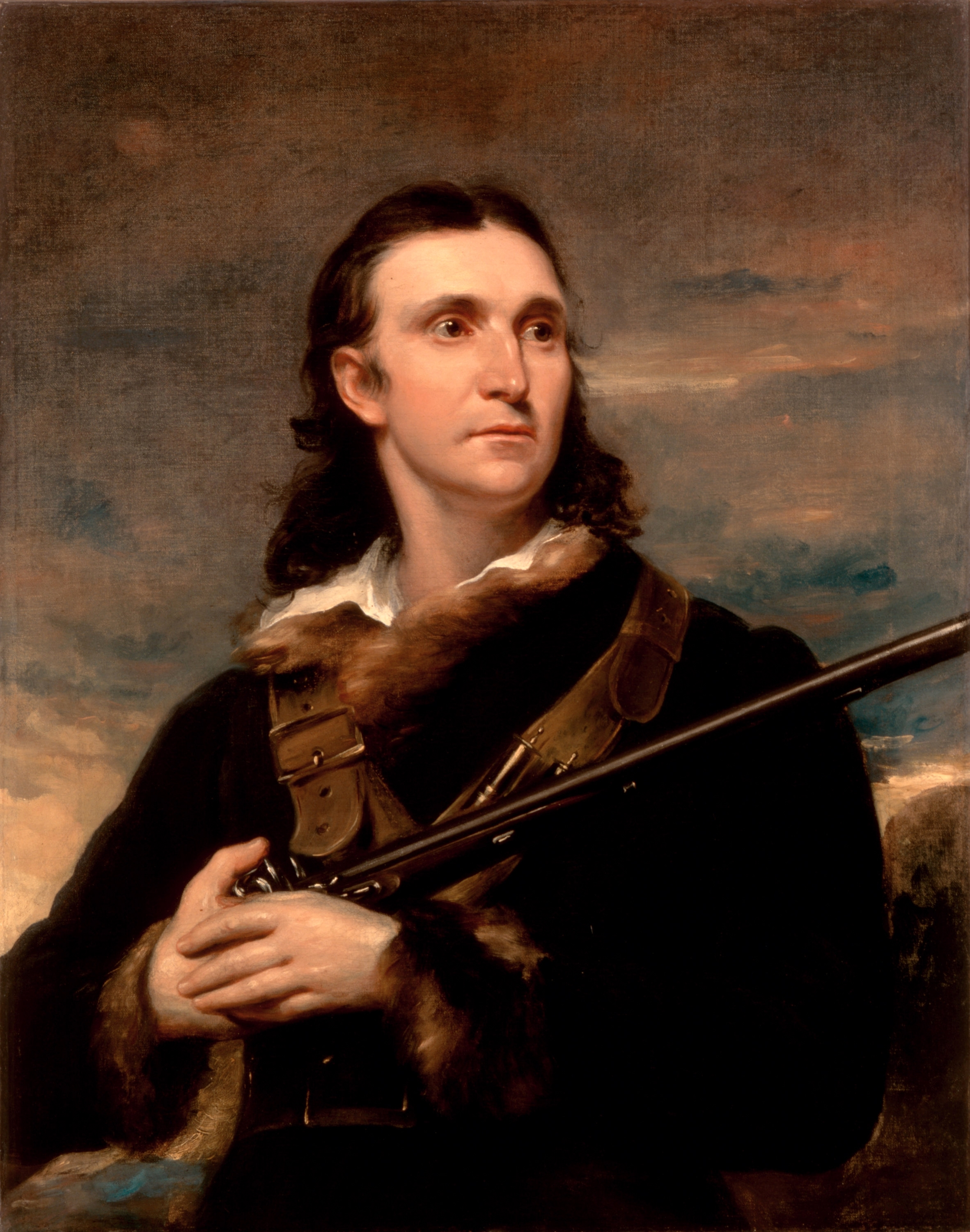
John James Audubon, 1826 portrait by John Syme, commissioned by William Home Lizars

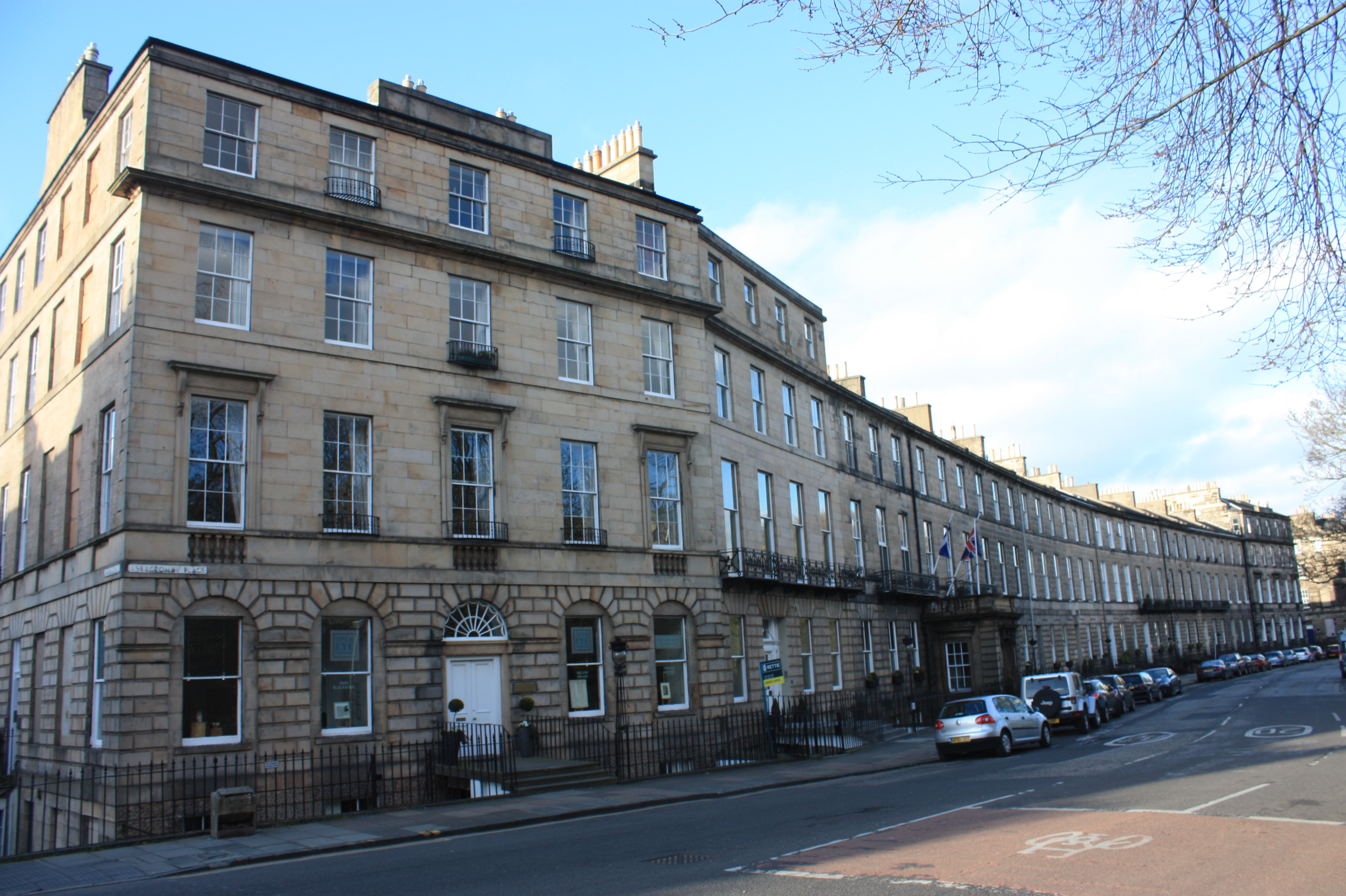
Abercromby Place, Edinburgh

A nephew of Patrick Syme, he was born in Edinburgh to Alexander Syme and Catharine Johnston on 17 January 1795. He studied in the Trustees' Academy on Picardy Place. He became a pupil and assistant of Sir Henry Raeburn, whose unfinished works he completed, and subsequently practised with success as a portrait-painter in Edinburgh.

In the 1830s he is listed as living at 32 Abercromby Place in Edinburgh's Second New Town.

Syme was an original member of the Royal Scottish Academy, founded in 1826, and took an active part in its management. He died in Edinburgh on 3 August 1861.

== Works ==
Syme painted many portraits. That of John Barclay M.D. was exhibited at the London Royal Academy in 1819, and went to the Scottish National Gallery; it was engraved in mezzotint by Thomas Hodgetts, as were also those of John Broster and Andrew McKean. Syme's self-portrait went to the Royal Scottish Academy. His portrait of the Solicitor General, Lord Cockburn, was deposited with the Academy as his diploma work. A portrait of Alexander Henderson, Lord Provost of Edinburgh 1823-1825 hangs in the Merchant Hall in Edinburgh.
