= George Aikman =

Scottish painter and engraver

- Born: 20 May 1830; Edinburgh, Scotland, British Empire
- Died: 8 January 1905 (aged 74); Edinburgh, Scotland, British Empire
- Burial place: Warriston Cemetery, Scotland, United Kingdom
- Occupations: Painter, engraver
- Spouse: Elizabeth Barnett (m. 1859)
- Children: 3 daughters and 2 sons
- Parent(s): George Aikman; Alison McKay

George Aikman ARSA (20 May 1830 – 8 January 1905) was a Scottish painter and engraver.

== Life ==
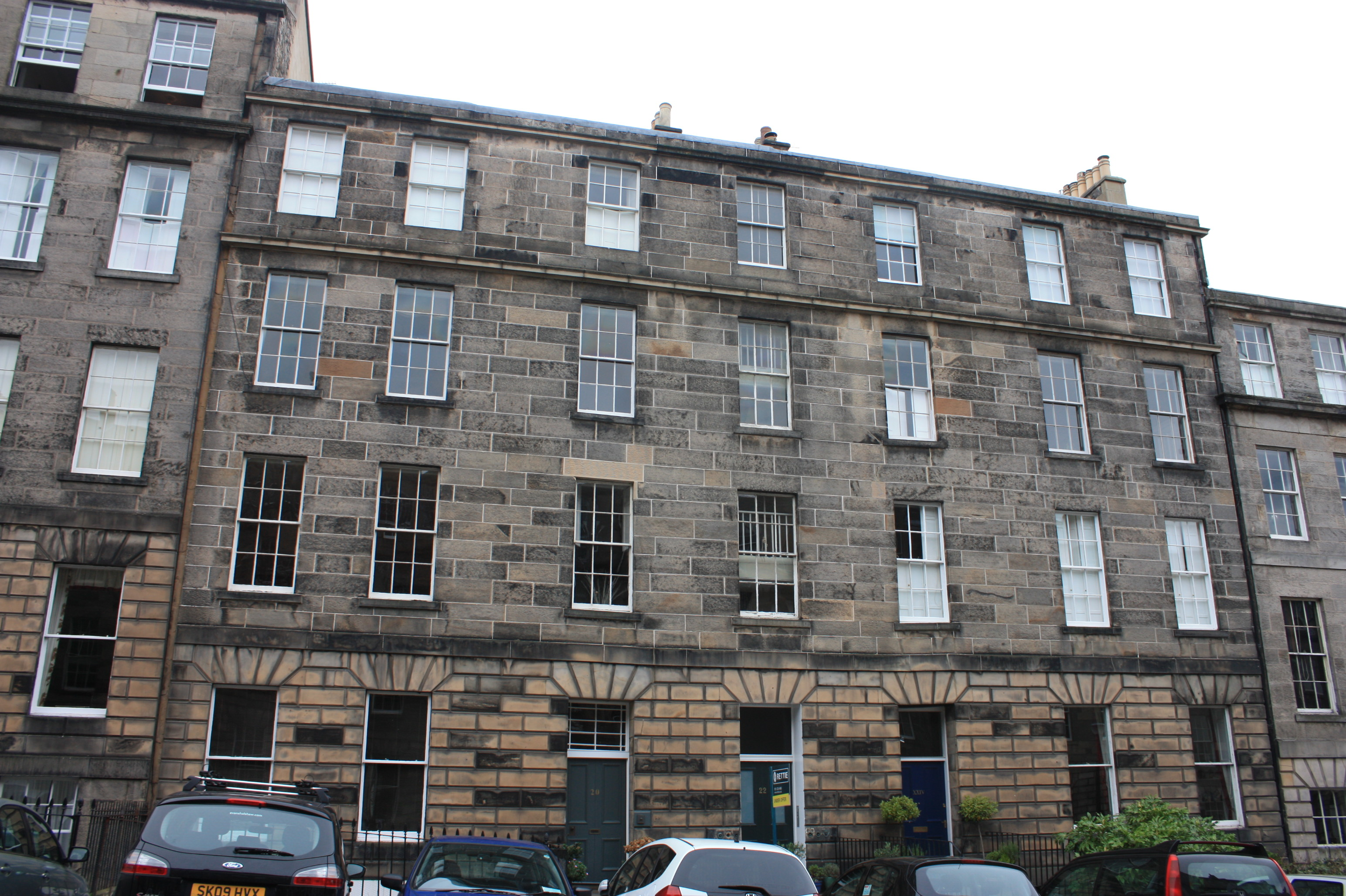
Aikman's home, 22 Scotland Street, Edinburgh

Born at the top of Warriston Close, in the High Street, Edinburgh, on 20 May 1830, was the ninth child of George Aikman (1788-1865) and his wife Alison McKay. The father, after employment by William Home Lizars the engraver, started business for himself about 1825 in Warriston Close, where he produced the plates and illustrations for the Encyclopædia Britannica seventh edition. Many of these were drawn and engraved by his son George.

From a private school, Aikman was sent to Edinburgh High School, where he was for three sessions in the class of Dr. James Boyd. He was then apprenticed to his father, who had moved his business to 29 North Bridge, and after a journeyman period, during which he worked in Manchester and London, he was admitted a partner. As an apprentice he had attended the classes of the Trustees' Academy, then directed by Robert Lauder, and the Royal Scottish Academy life-class.

By 1850, Aikman was showing work at the Scottish Academy exhibitions, but it was not until 1870 that he abandoned business for painting. In 1880 he was elected an A.R.S.A. Between 1874 and 1904 he exhibited at nine of the Royal Academy exhibitions in London.

In his final years, Aikman was living in a flat at 22 Scotland Street in Edinburgh's New Town.

Aikman died in Edinburgh on 8 January 1905, and was buried in Warriston cemetery.

== Works ==
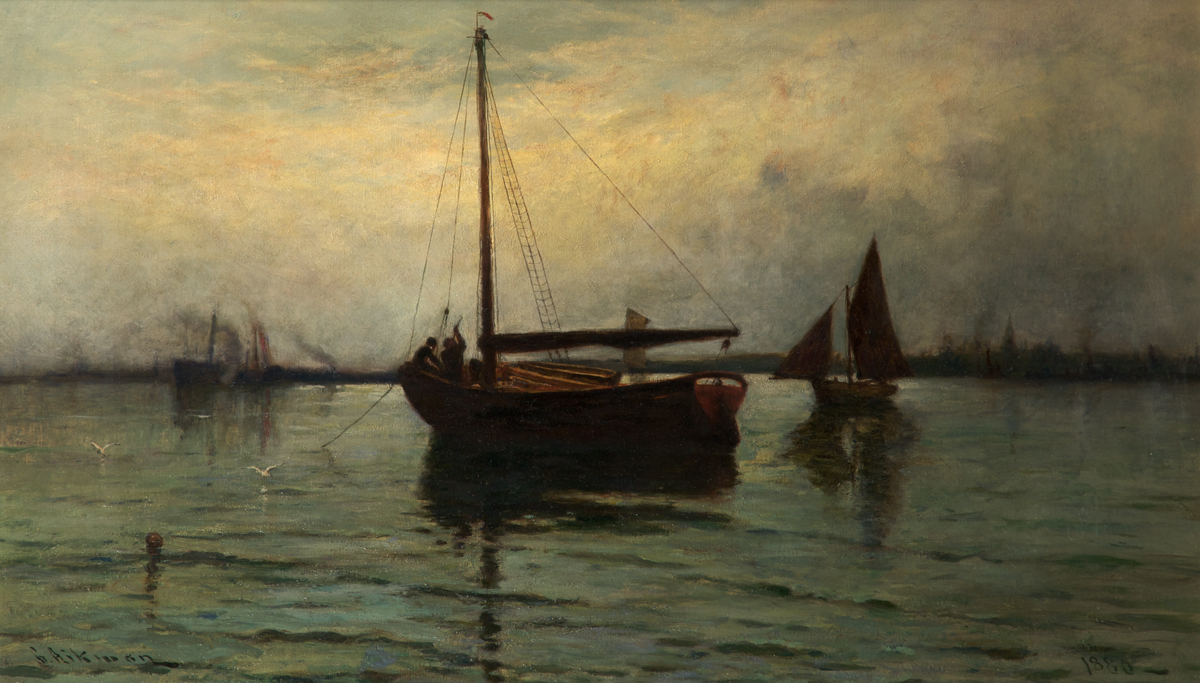
Weighing the Anchor by George Aikman

Aikman's theme as a painter was landscape, particularly in the Perthshire Highlands and Warwickshire. He practised etching during most of his life, and towards the end he engraved mezzotints. Impressions of some of these were exhibited, but only a few of them were published. The engraved plates included:

- Robert Burns (etching), after Alexander Nasmyth, and
- Sir Douglas Maclagan (etching), after Sir George Reid;

and among his original plates were:

- Carlyle in his Study (etching);
- Sir Daniel Macnee, P.R.S.A. (etching);
- Norham Castle (etching);
- Coming Storm across the Moor (mezzotint).

An etching after his picture For the Good of the Church (R.A., 1874) was purchased by the Association for the Promotion of the Fine Arts in Scotland. Aikman contributed to the Etcher (1880, 1882), English Etchings (1883-4), and Selected Etchings (1885), and he illustrated A Round of the Links: Views of the Golf Greens of Scotland (1893), with etchings after the drawings of John Smart, R.S.A. (1838–1899), and The Midlothian Eska (1895).

Aikman made some contributions to The Art Journal, on engravers and painters of earlier generations. He made drawings of ancient Edinburgh houses doomed to demolition, and the City Museum gathered a collection of them.

== Family ==
On 2 December 1859, Aikman married Elizabeth Barnett, who with three daughters and two sons survived him.
