= William Howison =

Scottish engraver

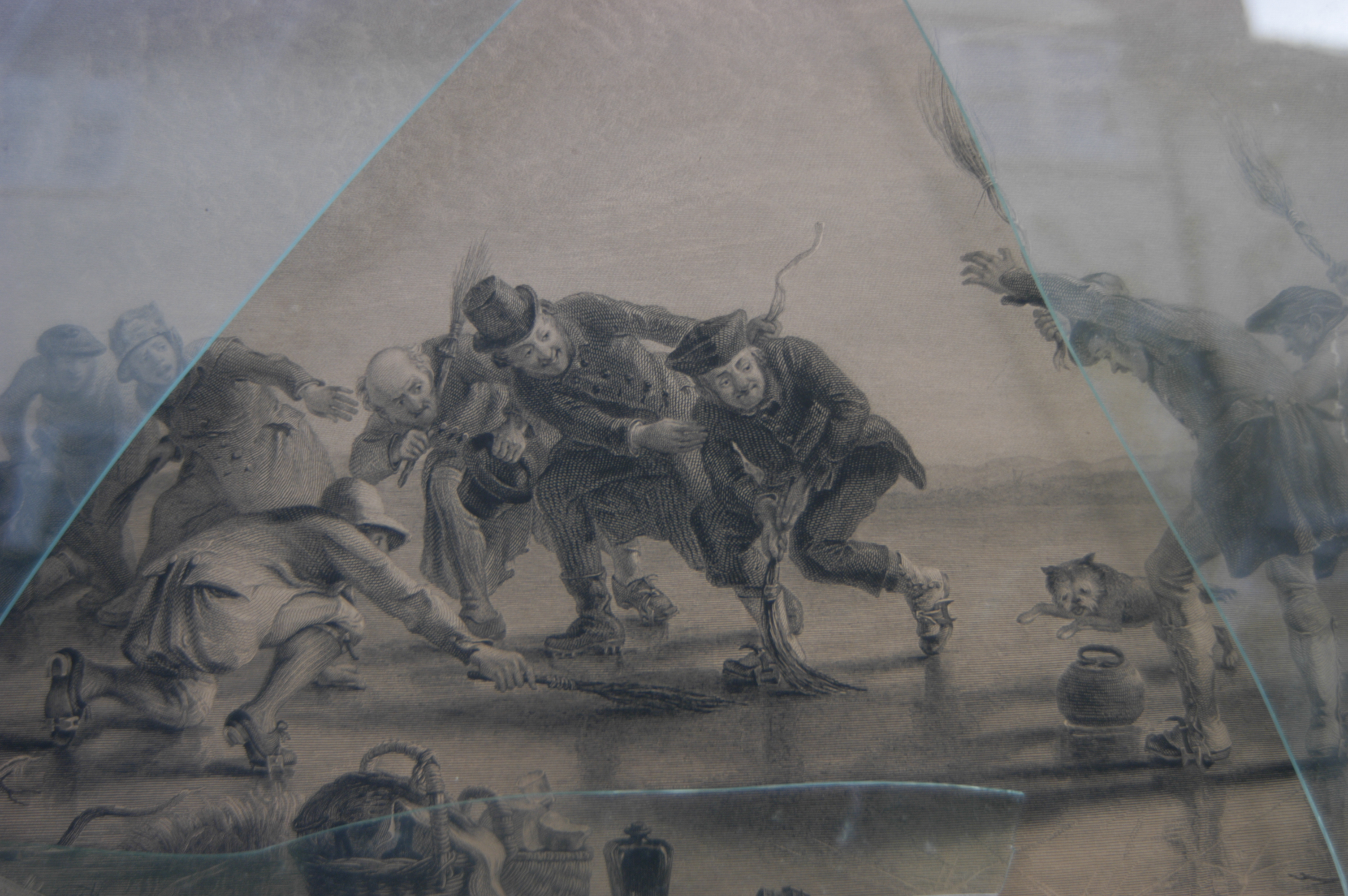
Photo of part of an engraving after Sir George Harvey P.R.S.A. (1806-1876) by William Howison A.R.S.A. (1798-1850), Curlers, 1838, on chine appliqué, published by A. Hill, Edinburgh, 1838

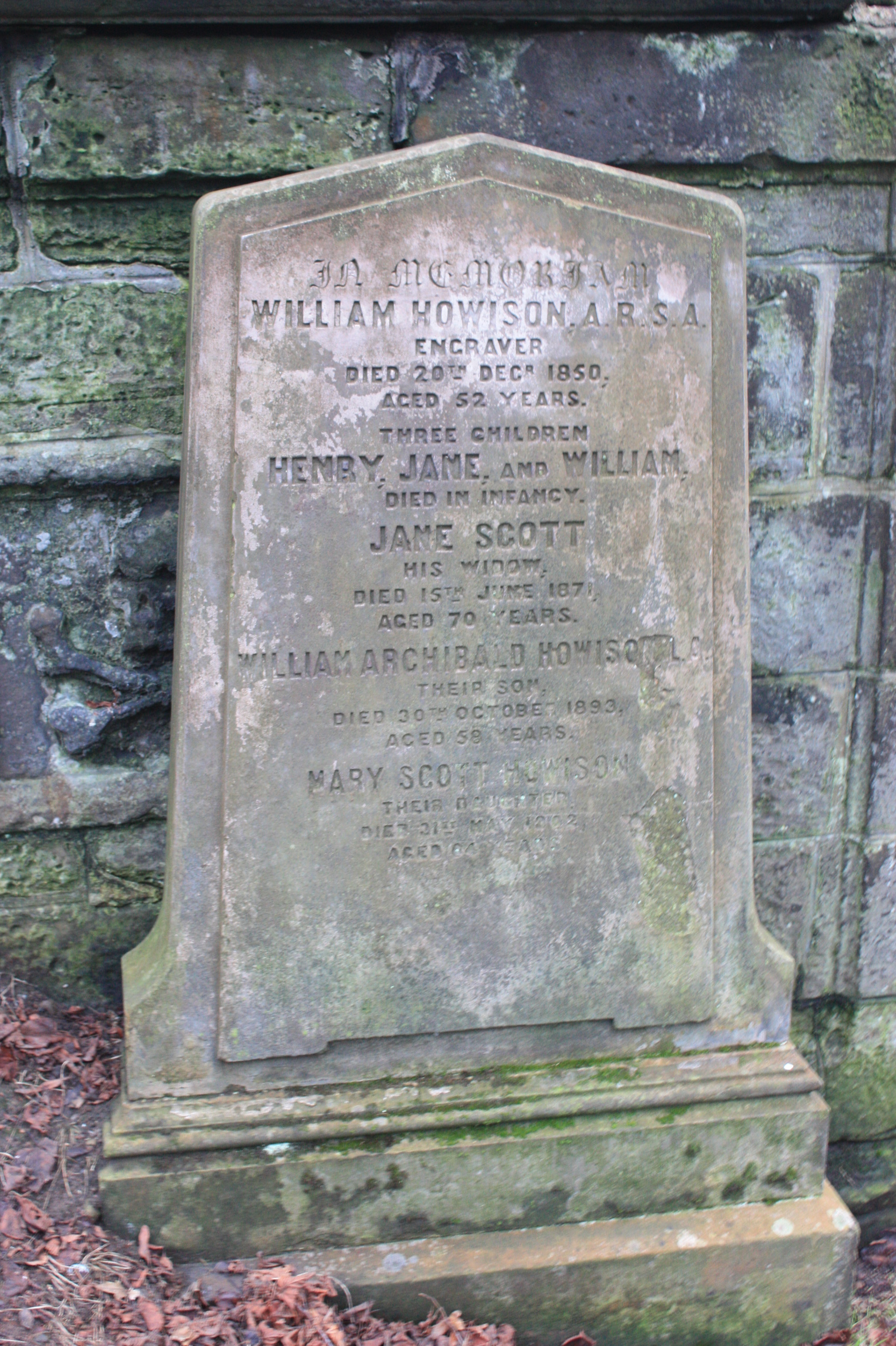
The grave of William Howison, Greyfriars Kirkyard

William Howison or Howieson, ARSA, (1798 – 20 Dec 1850) was a Scottish engraver in the early 19th century.

== Life ==
He was born in Edinburgh and educated at George Heriot's School.

He was originally apprenticed to an engraver named Wilson and later worked under William Home Lizars. He did not receive any formal education or instruction in drawing.

David Octavius Hill introduced him to Sir George Harvey, after which point he reproduced many of Harvey's paintings in engraved form. He gained particular notoriety for his engraving The Curlers which led to his acceptance into the Royal Scottish Academy, the only engraver admitted.

In the 1830s he is listed as living and working at 227 High Street on Edinburgh's Royal Mile.

He died on 20 December 1850 at 8 Frederick Street, Edinburgh, and is buried in Greyfriars Kirkyard in the centre of Edinburgh with his widow Jane Scott (1801-1871) and children. The grave lies in the northern half of the graveyard, towards the west side, against the sunken vault.

== Works ==
- The Curlers (1838)
- The Covenanters' Communion
- A Schule Skailin
- The First Letter from the Emigrants (after Thomas Faed RA)
