= Daniel Lizars =

Scottish map-maker (1793–1875)

Daniel Lizars Jr. (1793–1875) was a 19th-century Scottish engraver, map-maker and publisher.

== Life ==
World Map by Lizars 1831

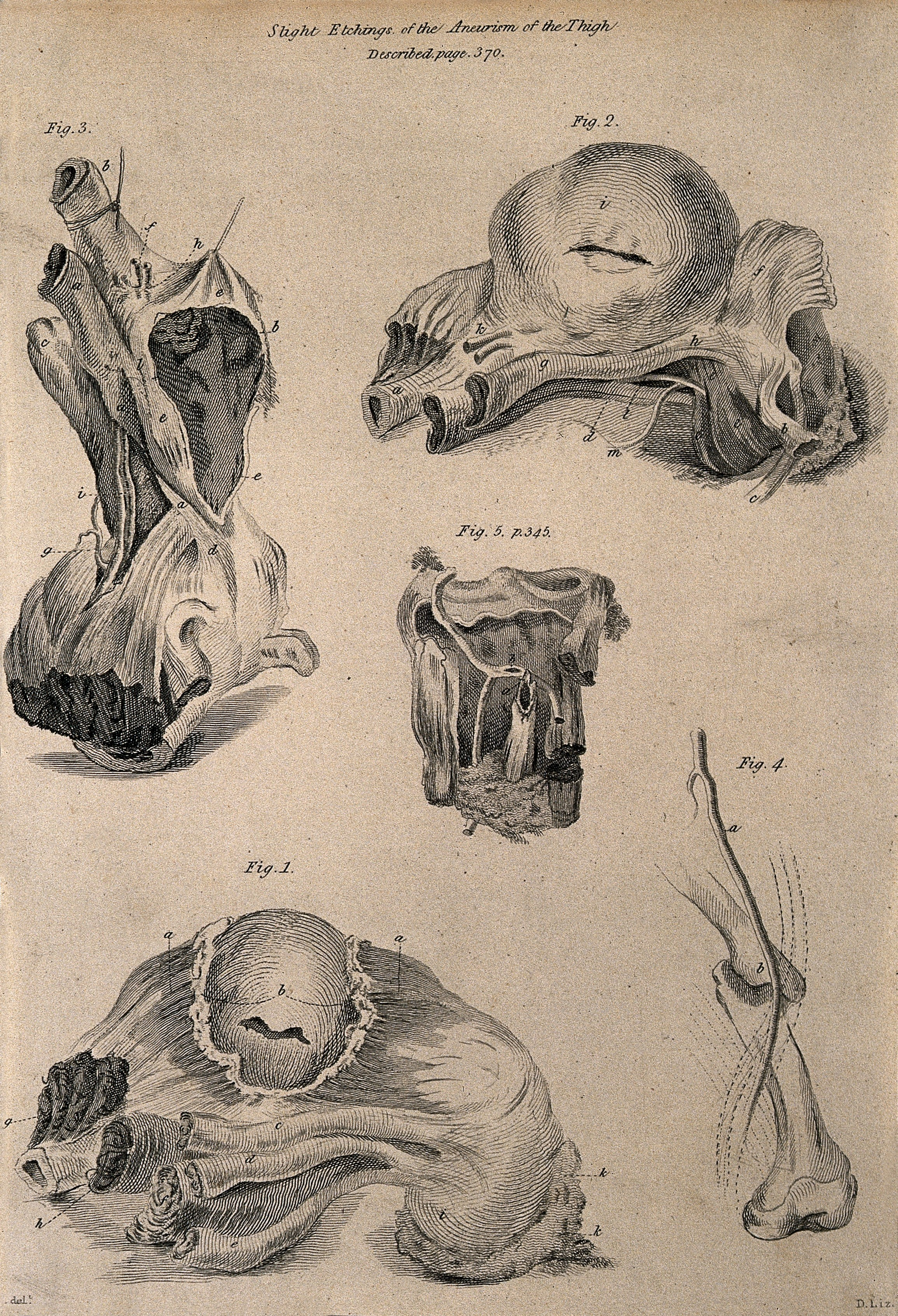
Five examples of aneurisms of the thigh, by Daniel Lizars 1810 - probably for John Lizars

He was born in May 1793 in Edinburgh the son of Daniel Lizars Sr. (1754–1812) and his wife, Margaret Home. The family lived at the "Backstairs" on Parliament Close in Edinburgh, off the Royal Mile. His house was destroyed in the Great Fire of Edinburgh in 1824.

He was apprenticed as a printer in his father's firm alongside George Bartholomew, patriarch of the Bartholomew map-making dynasty.

On his father's death (1812), aged only 19, he took over the family business. He expanded and began specialising in mapmaking.

In the 1830s, he was living at 9 South St David Street (and working at 5) located between Princes Street and St Andrews Square.

In 1832 his company went bankrupt. He emigrated to Canada with his wife and family (including his widowed mother) and settled in Colborne Township on Lake Huron. His brothers stayed in Edinburgh.

Apart from one or two return visits to Britain he lived the rest of his life in Canada. He was involved in local politics and also served as a major in the 1st Huron Militia 1837/38 during the rebellions.

He died in Goderich, Ontario in 1875.

His book collection (650 volumes) were donated to the McGlaughlin Library of the University of Guelph in 1982. It is known as the Pioneer Collection.

== Family ==
He married Rabina Hutchison in Renfrew in 1818.

His brothers included John Lizars, William Home Lizars and his sister Jane Home Lizars later married Sir William Jardine. His daughter Helen Hutchison Lizars is thought to have married the son of John Galt, who was a near neighbour in Canada.
