= John Lizars =

Scottish surgeon, anatomist and medical author

John Lizars FRSE
- Born: 1792; Edinburgh, Scotland
- Died: 21 May 1860 (aged 67–68); Edinburgh, Scotland
- Education: University of Edinburgh
- Occupation: surgeon
- Medical career
- Profession: surgeon, anatomist, medical author

Prof John Lizars FRSE (15 May 1792–21 May 1860) was a Scottish surgeon, anatomist and medical writer.

He was professor of surgery at the Royal College of Surgeons of Edinburgh and senior surgeon at the Royal Infirmary of Edinburgh. He performed the first ovariotomy in Scotland in 1825. One of his pupils was Erasmus Alvey Darwin, older brother of Charles Darwin, in 1826 when both brothers were at the university.

Besides authoring an early work on the dangers of tobacco, The Use and Abuse of Tobacco, Lizars published a number of important and beautifully illustrated anatomical texts in the early 19th century.

== Life ==
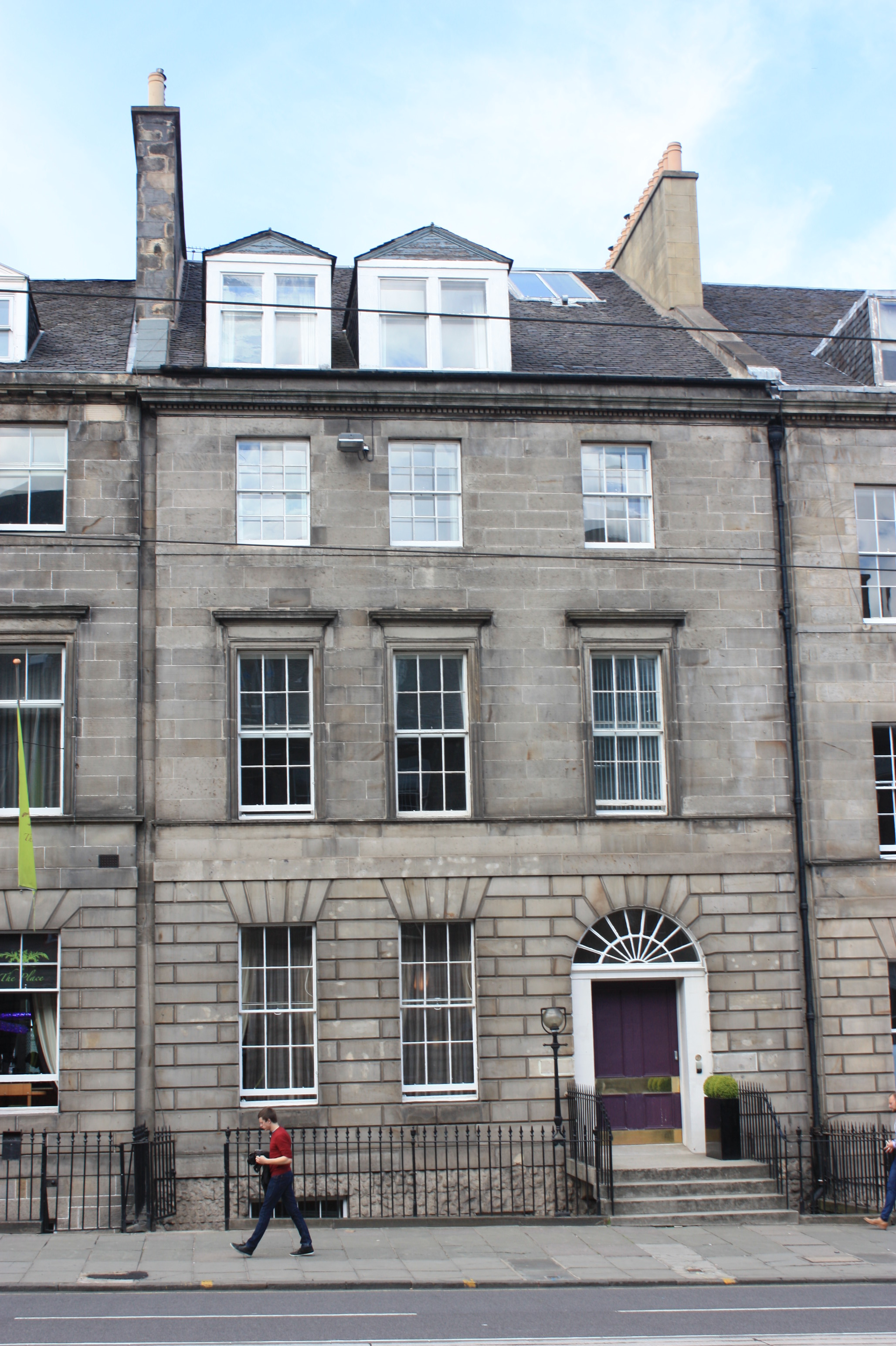
Lizars' house at 38 York Place, Edinburgh

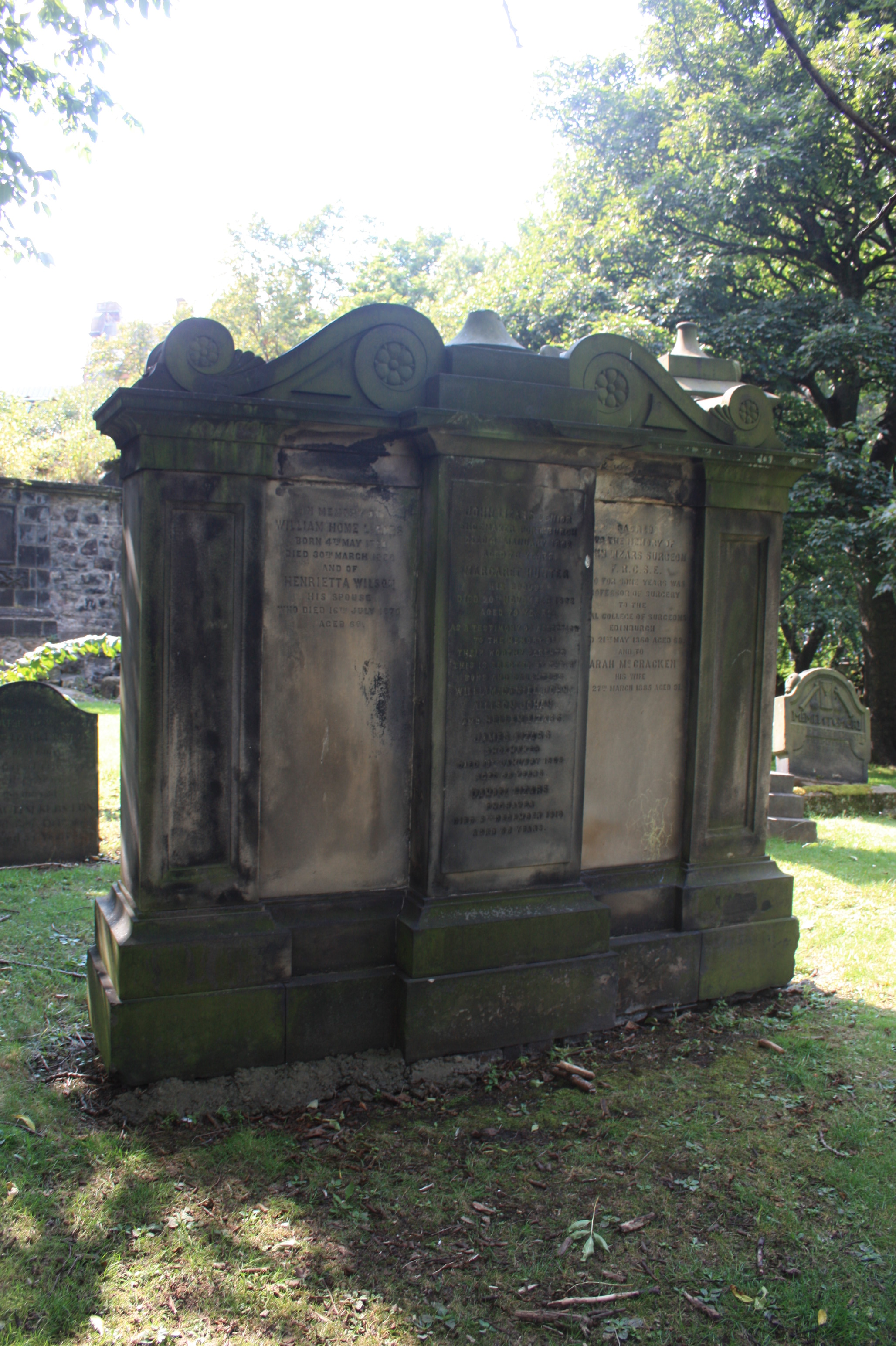
The Lizars grave, St Cuthberts, Edinburgh

The son of Daniel Lizars Sr (1754–1812), a publisher and engraver, and his wife Margaret Home, he was born in 1792 at the "Backstairs" on Parliament Close in Edinburgh, off the Royal Mile. His siblings were: Jane Home Lizars, who later married Sir William Jardine; William Home Lizars; and Daniel Lizars.

He was educated at the Royal High School, Edinburgh going on to study medicine at the University of Edinburgh. He served his apprenticeship under Dr John Bell (Joseph Bell's grandfather). He obtained his doctorate (MD) in 1810, then acted as surgeon on board a man-of-war commanded by Admiral Sir Charles Napier. He saw active service on the Portuguese coast, during the Peninsular War, under Lord Exmouth.

Returning to Edinburgh in 1814, he was elected a Fellow of the Royal College of Surgeons, and became a partner with John Bell, his old medical tutor, and Robert Allan. He was successful, first in partnership and afterwards alone. In 1821 he was elected a Fellow of the Royal Society of Edinburgh his proposer being Lord William Napier.

In 1825 he began lecturing in anatomy and surgery, and in 1831 was appointed to succeed John Turner as Professor of surgery in the Royal College of Surgeons, Edinburgh. With this appointment he combined that of senior operating surgeon of the Edinburgh Royal Infirmary, where Robert Liston was his colleague.

Lizars introduced into surgery the operation for the removal of the upper jaw, and his name survived in the "Lizars lines".

In the 1830s he is listed as living at 38 York Place in Edinburgh's New Town.

== Feud with Syme ==
Lizars claimed in print in 1838 that James Syme had endangered a patient's life and ruined his health by want of care in averting hemorrhage; Syme had been an unsuccessful competitor for the post held by Lizars. Syme replied with a lawsuit, in which he claimed damages for false and malicious statement. The suit was successful, but with token damages only. Syme, however, had a probable role in dissuading the College of Surgeons from re-electing a professor of surgery when Lizars's tenure of the office finished. Lizars published further criticism, in 1851, of external urethrotomy as practised by Syme. Syme retaliated with a comprehensive personal attack; this time Lizars sued, and lost.

Lizars had become eccentric, and was unable to obtain further public appointment; and his private practice declined.

== Death ==
Lizars died suddenly on 21 May 1860, at his final home, 15 South Charlotte Street off Charlotte Square. The suspected cause was an overdose of laudanum.

He is buried with his grandparents and family in St Cuthbert's Churchyard at the west end of Princes Street Gardens. The grave lies in the raised south-west section.

== Works ==
Lizars in 1822 issued the work by which he is now known, A System of Anatomical Plates of the Human Body, accompanied with Descriptions, and Physiological, Pathological, and Surgical Observations, Edinburgh. The plates were done by his brother William under Lizars's close supervision. It was followed in 1835 by Observations on Extraction of diseased Ovaria, illustrated by Plates coloured after Nature, 1835, and in 1835 by a System of Practical Surgery, with numerous explanatory Plates, the Drawings after Nature, Edinburgh.

His book The Use and Abuse of Tobacco was published in 1859, and is one of the first works to recognise both its addictive nature and its potential damage.
