= William Home Lizars =

Scottish painter and engraver

William Home Lizars (1788 – 30 March 1859) was a Scottish painter, engraver and publisher.

== Life ==
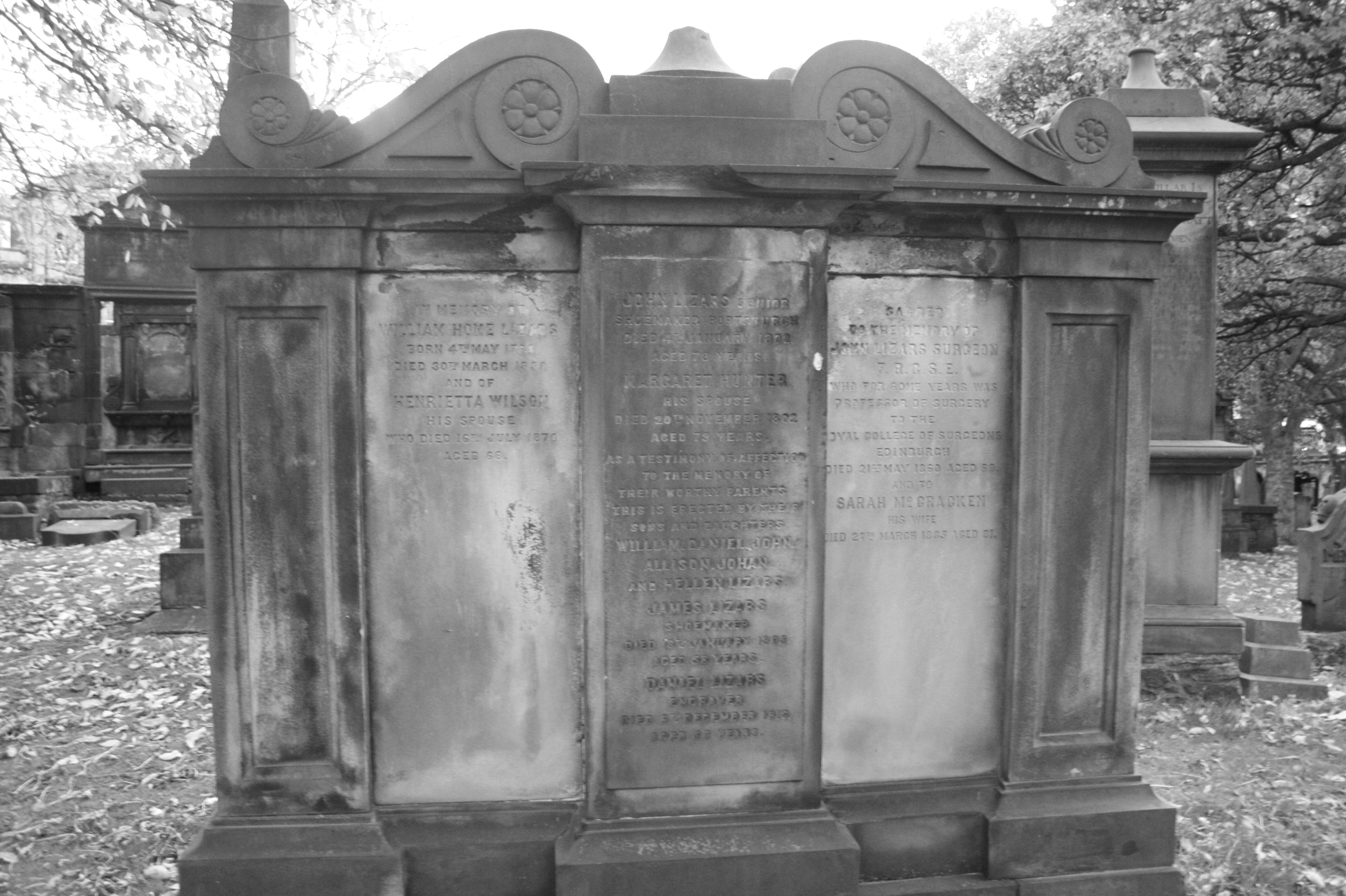
The grave of William Home Lizars, St Cuthberts, Edinburgh

The son of Daniel Lizars, and brother of the surgeon John Lizars, he was born at Edinburgh in 1788, and was educated at the high school there. His sister Jean (Jane) Home married Sir William Jardine. His father was a publisher and an engraver who had been a pupil of Andrew Bell, and engraved portraits as book illustrations. Lizars was first apprenticed to his father, from whom he learnt engraving, and then entered as a student under John Graham in the Trustees' Academy at Edinburgh, where he was a fellow-student with Sir David Wilkie.

In 1812, on the death of his father, Lizars had to carry on the business of engraving and copperplate printing in order to support his mother and family. He employed the artists Horatio McCulloch and Daniel Macnee. Another employee was William Howison, mainly on small plates. George Aikman, father of George Aikman the painter, also worked for Lizars before setting up on his own.

From 1819 onward Lizars produced the plates for a number of works on natural history, including the elephant folio publication Illustrations of British Ornithology by Prideaux John Selby. The hand-coloured plates for the general ornithological work Illustrations of Ornithology (1826–43), edited by Prideaux John Selby and Sir William Jardine, were engraved and coloured by Lizars' studio.

Lizars encountered J. J. Audubon in Edinburgh in October 1826, introduced (on Audubon's account) with his portfolio by the naturalists Patrick Neill and Prideaux John Selby. So began an intense period when Lizars helped Audubon meet Edinburgh luminaries likely to be useful to him: Robert Jameson, David Brewster and James Wilson in particular. Lizars had a celebrated portrait of Audubon painted (it is now in the White House), by John Syme, in his wolfskin coat, in late November; and the following day took him to meet George Combe and other phrenologists. Lizars had agreed to publish Audubon's The Birds of America. After a promising start, the business did not go well, and Audubon moved the production to London. The work was completed by the Havell family.

In the early 1830s he is listed as operating from 3 St James Square, in Edinburgh, the centre for printers at that time. He was still living there at the end of his life.

Lizars perfected a method of etching which performed the easy functions of wood-engraving in the illustration of books. In the years 1833-43 he published The Naturalist's Library, a series of 40 volumes which was edited by Sir William Jardine.

He died in Edinburgh on 30 March 1859, leaving a widow and family. He is buried in St Cuthbert's Churchyard at the west end of Princes Street. His brother John Lizars, surgeon (d.1860) lies with him. The grave lies on the small mound, south-west of the church.

Lizars took an active part in the foundation of the Royal Scottish Academy.

== Works ==
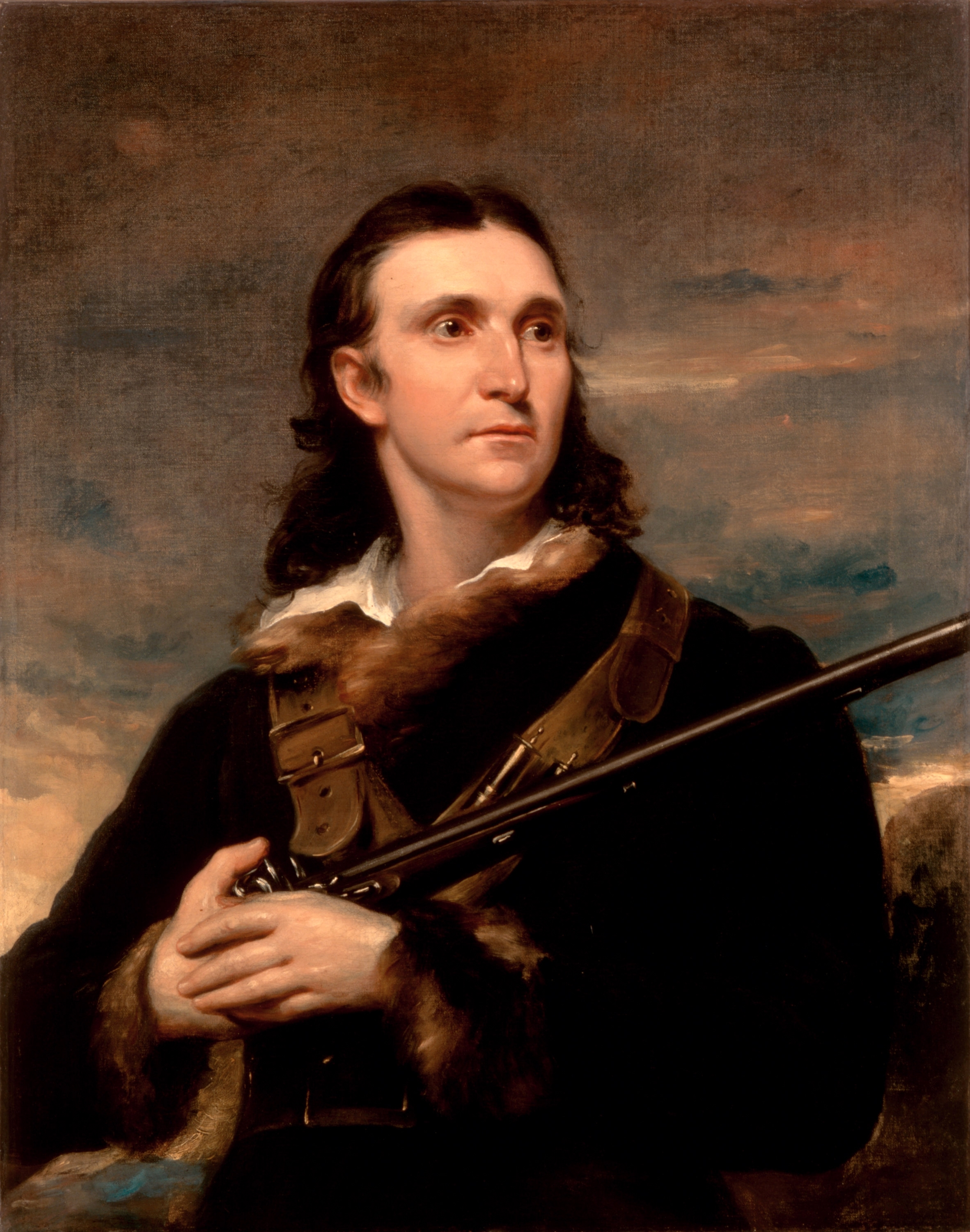
John James Audubon, 1826 portrait by John Syme, commissioned by Lizars

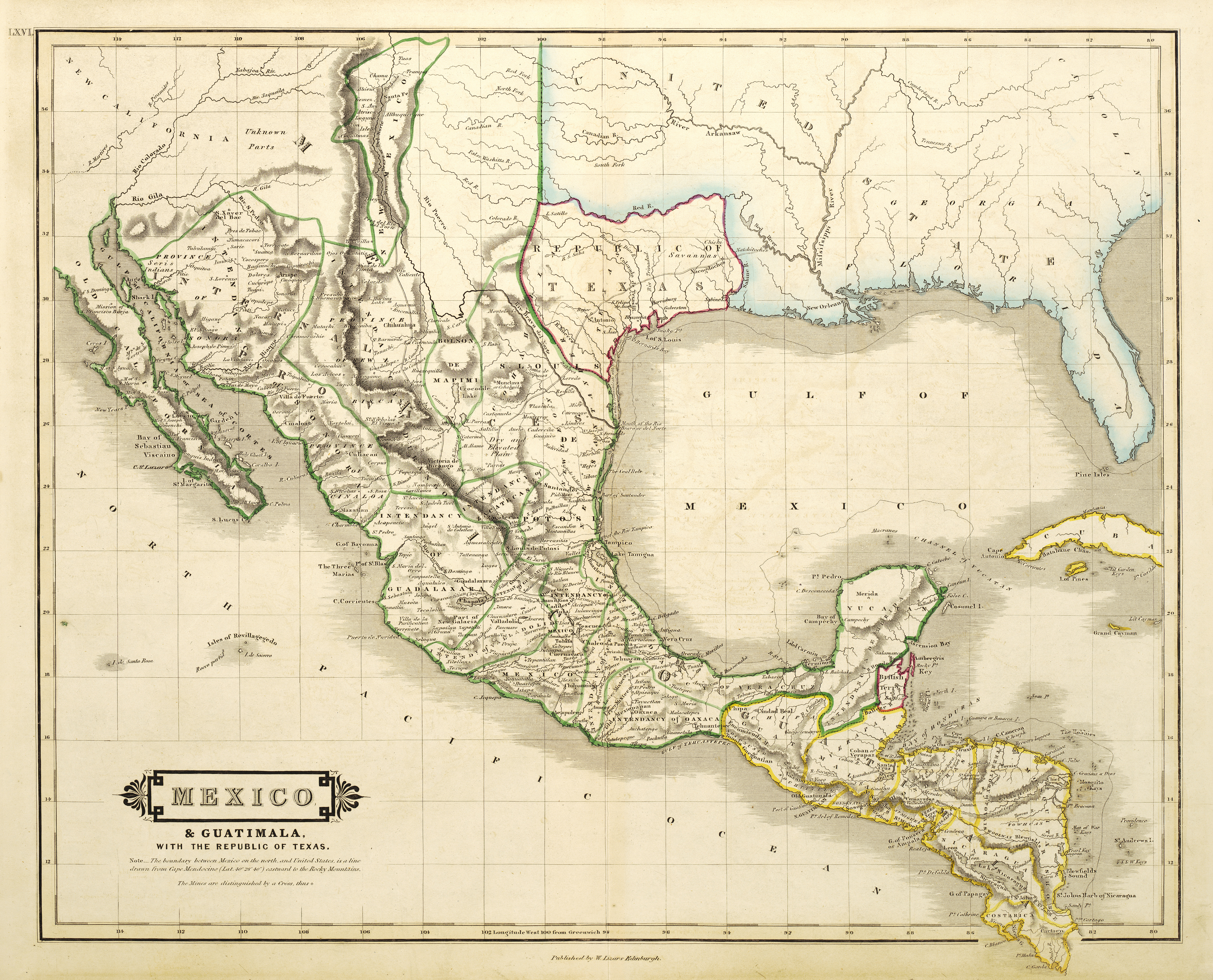
Lizars' 1836 map Mexico & Guatimala

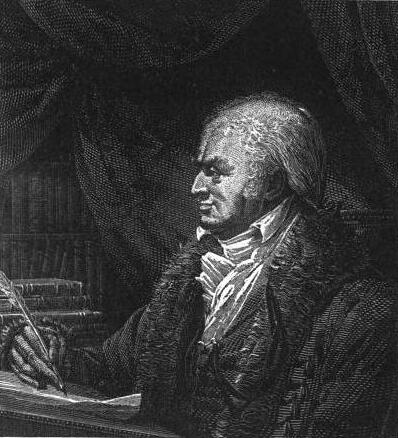
Peter Morris M.D., fictional creation of John Gibson Lockhart by Lizars, 1819, in his new style of metallic relief engraving

From 1808 to 1815, Lizars was a frequent exhibitor of portraits, and of sacred and domestic subjects, at exhibitions in Edinburgh. In 1812 he sent two pictures to the Royal Academy in London, Reading the Will and A Scotch Wedding. They were admired, were hung on the line, and were engraved. They went to the National Gallery of Scotland at Edinburgh.

He designed notes for the Bank of Scotland, and is thought to have created the emblem for Scottish Widows adopted in 1818. It shows a figure of Ceres (Plenty) standing amongst cherubs and holding a cornucopia of riches. On her left is a tombstone and on her right kneels a widow with her daughters.

He engraved The Ommeganck at Antwerp, after Gustave Wappers, for the Royal Gallery of Art, and Puck and the Fairies, after Richard Dadd. He also engraved plates of Scottish scenery for publications, and the Anatomical Plates of 1822 for his brother John.

Two pictures of churches by Lizars were in the Royal Scottish Academy's collection. There was a pencil drawing by him, done in 1815, of John Flaxman, in the Scottish National Portrait Gallery.
