= Morningside (Edinburgh ward) =

Electoral ward in Edinburgh, Scotland

Location of the ward within Edinburgh

Morningside is one of the seventeen wards used to elect members of the City of Edinburgh Council. Established in 2007 along with the other wards, it elects four Councillors. As its name suggests, the ward's territory is based around the community of Morningside to the south of the city centre, also including Braid Hills, Bruntsfield, Burghmuirhead (Church Hill and Holy Corner), Greenbank, Greenhill, Marchmont, Merchiston and Polwarth.

A minor 2017 boundary change in the north of the ward saw the loss of the densely populated Tollcross neighbourhood, but the overall population increased slightly due to housebuilding in other areas. At that time, the ward's name was also amended from its original title of Morningside/Meadows – the well-known Meadows park area to which this referred had never been fully within its boundaries. In 2021, the ward had a population of 31,379.

== Councillors ==
Election	Councillors			
2007	Mark McInnes (Conservative)	Paul Godzik (Labour)	Marilyne Angela MacLaren (Liberal Democrats)	Alison Johnstone (Greens)
2012	Mark McInnes (Conservative)	Paul Godzik (Labour)	Sandy Howat (SNP)	Melanie Main (Greens)
2017	Nick Cook (Conservative)	Mandy Watt (Labour)	Neil Ross (Liberal Democrats)	Melanie Main (Greens)
2022	Marie-Clair Munro (Conservative)	Mandy Watt (Labour)	Neil Ross (Liberal Democrats)	Ben Parker (Greens)

== Election results ==
=== 2022 election ===
Morningside - 4 seats
Party	Candidate	FPv%	Count						
Party	Candidate	FPv%	1	2	3	4	5	6	7
Labour	Mandy Helen Watt (incumbent)	23.2	3,145						
Liberal Democrats	Neil John Ross (incumbent)	21.2	2,877						
Green	Ben Parker	21.1	2,854						
Conservative	Marie-Clare Munro	17.6	2,390	2,489	2,560	2,564	2,589	2,616	3,020
SNP	Mairianna Clyde	15.5	2,097	2,209	2,233	2,337	2,343	2,430	
Alba	Leah Gunn Barrett	1.0	132	136	138	140	151		
Scottish Libertarian	Peter Sidor	0.4	52	62	66	67			
Electorate: 25,204 Valid: 13,547 Spoilt: 71 Quota: 2,710 Turnout: 54.0%

=== 2017 election ===
2017 City of Edinburgh Council election

Morningside - 4 seats
Party	Candidate	FPv%	Count				
Party	Candidate	FPv%	1	2	3	4	5
Conservative	Nick Cook *	22.17%	3,010				
Green	Melanie Main (incumbent)	19.36%	2,629	2,631	2,721		
Liberal Democrats	Neil Ross	15.02%	2,039	2,054	2,508	2,510	3,477
Labour	Mandy Watt	18.21%	2,473	2,480	2,699	2,701	3,441
SNP	Sandy Howat (incumbent)	17.87%	2,427	2,429	2,450	2,452	
Conservative	Chris Land	7.37%	1,001	1,260			
Electorate: 23,861 Valid: 13,579 Spoilt: 103 Quota: 2,716 Turnout: 13,682 (57.3%)

=== 2012 election ===
2012 City of Edinburgh Council election

Meadows/Morningside - 4 seats
Party	Candidate	FPv%	Count						
Party	Candidate	FPv%	1	2	3	4	5	6	7
Conservative	Mark McInnes (incumbent)	29.90	3,125						
Green	Melanie Main	19.75	2,064	2,209					
Labour	Paul Godzik (incumbent)	19.64	2,053	2,171	2171				
SNP	Sandy Howat	15.79	1,650	1,723	1,754	1,767	1,784	1,857	2,390
Liberal Democrats	Jenny Dawe *	12.30	1,285	1,574	1,615	1,639	1,661	1,730	
Pirate	Phil Hunt	1.87	195	211	224	230	264		
UKIP	William Macadam	0.76	79	170	173	175			
Electorate: 22,328 Valid: 10,451 Spoilt: 39 Quota: 2,091 Turnout: 10,490 (47%)

=== 2007 election ===
2007 City of Edinburgh Council election

2007 Council election: Meadows/Morningside
Party	Candidate	FPv%	Count								
Party	Candidate	FPv%	1	2	3	4	5	6	7	8	9
Conservative	Mark McInnes	26.4	3,844								
Liberal Democrats	Marilyne Angela MacLaren	19.3	2,817	3,021.25							
Green	Alison Johnstone	15.2	2,209	2,309.16	2,329.46	2,353.12	2,386.31	2,477.31	3,070.46		
Labour	Paul Godzik	14.0	2,043	2,108.95	2,122.35	2,126.64	2,142.19	2,168.09	2,358.63	2,396.23	3,103.04
Liberal Democrats	Sue Tritton	11.5	1,683	1,811.71	1,879.14	1,889.71	1,927.65	1,937.82	2,235.48	2,301.73	
SNP	Richard Lewis	10.5	1,529	1,584.86	1,592.03	1,609.31	1,624.52	1,649.46			
Scottish Socialist	Helga Janzen	0.9	137	139.71	140.51	179.76	184.00				
Solidarity	Pat Smith	0.8	122	125.94	126.40						
Independent	Duncan Thorp	0.7	105	151.76	152.93	157.98					
Electorate: 23,263 Valid: 14,489 Spoilt: 83 Quota: 2,898 Turnout: 62.6%
