= Jordan Burn =

Stream/watercourse in Edinburgh, Scotland

Coordinates: 55.9265°N 3.199°W

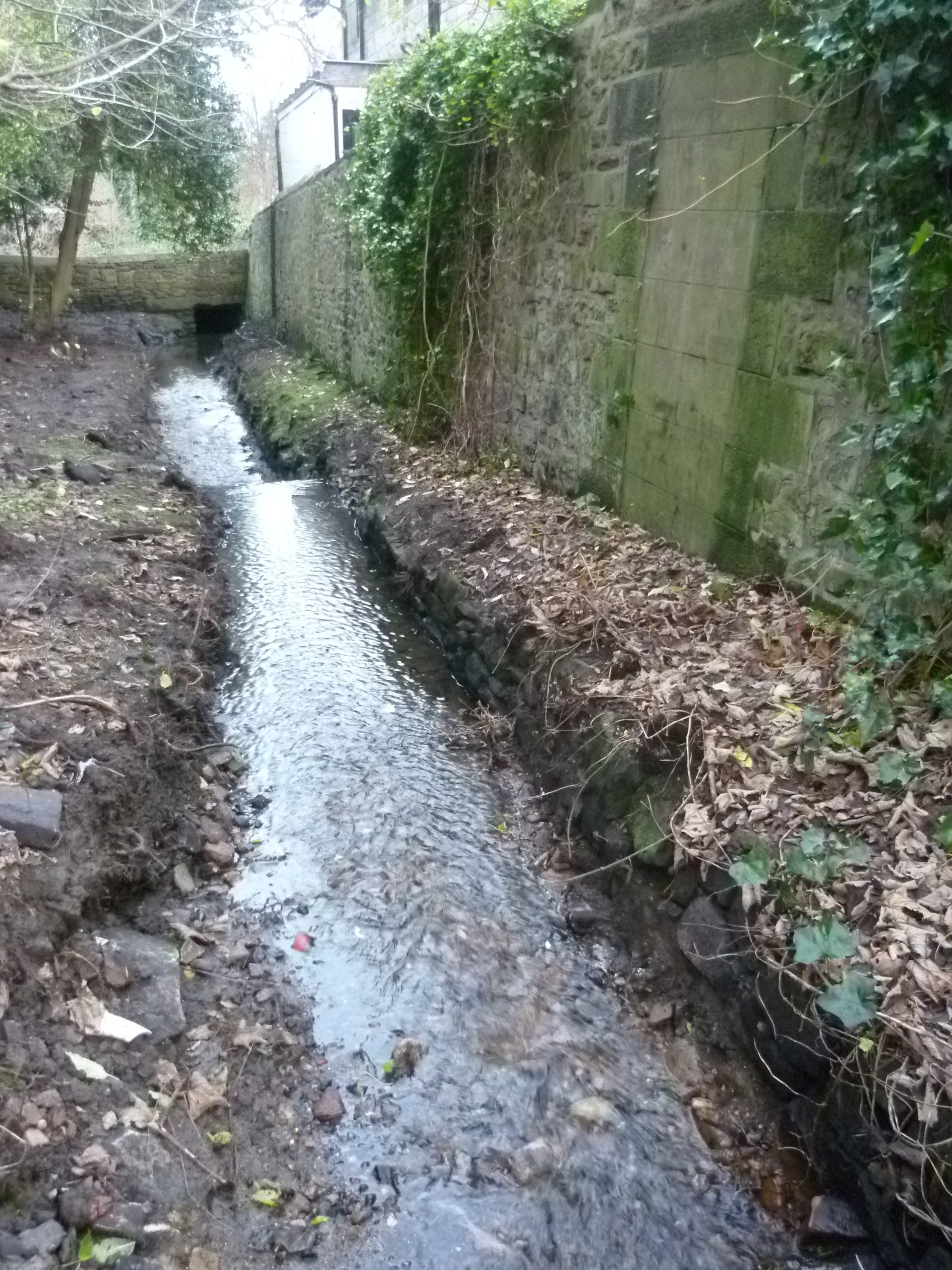
The Jordan Burn about to enter a culvert on its way to Blackford

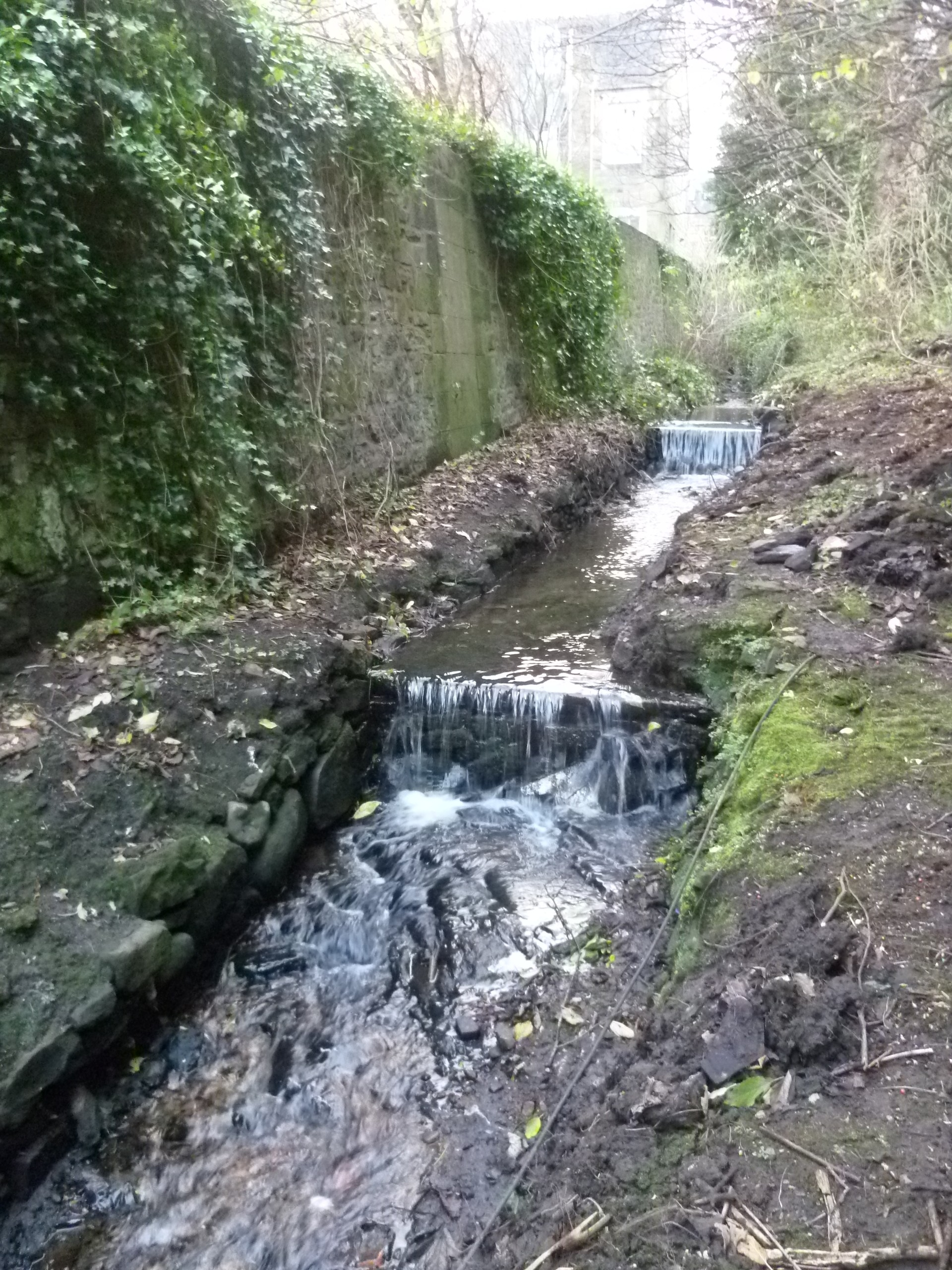
The Jordan Burn near Canaan Lane

The Jordan Burn, is the name of a stream, now culverted for much of its course, that runs through the Victorian suburb of Morningside in Edinburgh, Scotland, and was until 1856 the southern boundary of the city and county. It is a tributary of the Braid Burn. Its eastern part is known as the Pow Burn.

The Jordan first appears so named on the Roy map of Edinburgh (1753) "in obvious allusion to its position between 'Egypt' and 'Canaan'" (see below). It was originally called the Pow Burn when the Wester Burgh Muir, the area that became Morningside, was first feued by the Edinburgh magistrates in 1586. It was also popularly known in the past as the "Braid Burn", because it marked the northern boundary of the Braid Estate, but should not be confused with its namesake above which takes a more southerly course.

The Jordan rises on Craighouse Hill, then runs eastwards under Myreside Road and along the southern edge of the Royal Edinburgh Hospital grounds, where it is fed by the Comiston Burn from South Morningside, to the end of Maxwell Street. It then flows under Morningside Road between the south side of Jordan Lane and north side of Nile Grove, continuing from there under Woodburn Terrace and through the grounds of the Astley Ainslie Hospital, where it surfaces briefly. It then continues through Blackford until it reaches Mayfield, at which point it becomes known by its old name, the Pow Burn. After leaving Newington, it joins the Braid Burn at Peffermill, where it turns in a north-easterly direction. At Duddingston Mills the name changes again, this time to the Figgate Burn which enters the Firth of Forth at Portobello, having travelled a total distance of approximately ten miles.

The name is one of a cluster of biblical names for lands and houses in the Morningside area. These include 'Eden', 'Paradise', 'Jordan', 'Nile', 'Salem', 'Bethel', 'Hebron', 'Goshen', and 'Zion Mount'. They seem connected in origin with a farm called 'Egypt' which stood just south of the burn where present-day Nile Grove and Woodburn Terrace meet. The farm buildings were demolished in the 1890s when the city expanded southwards on the slope of the former Burgh Muir. The farm is first mentioned in the city's Burgh Records of 1585 where it is referred to as "Littill Egypt". Since the leaders of Britain's gypsy communities often styled themselves Kings of 'Little Egypt', it has been surmised that the name indicates a gypsy presence on the muir in the 16th century when "Egyptianis" are mentioned in several official documents from the reign of James V. The lands lying immediately north of the farm, beyond the Jordan Burn, are described as "Canaan", in the Burgh Records of 1661, suggesting the initial spread of names with biblical associations. These appear to have proliferated in the Victorian period, being very likely added by Bible-conscious residents of the expanding suburb of Morningside who wished to perpetuate the tradition; so much so that it contributed to the district's reputation of being the city's "Bible Belt".

As late as the mid-1960s, the author of a survey of Edinburgh wrote of the community in Morningside that,

...respect is due to this disciplined if stolid army of South Edinburgh, repairing each week in satins and 'stands' of Sabbath broadcloth to its respective persuasions at 'Holy Corner', (Churchhill) and similar ecclesiastical meccas, and in the pleasant Sunday afternoons making pilgrimages to the large, airy, orderly and flowery cemeteries of Grange, Morningside and Newington. This society sent many of its sons and daughters to settle in New Zealand (among other regions) and to graft the names and cultures of home into places like Dunedin. Its influence has been truly world-wide. So, if an Empire has been lost, this cannot be laid at Morningside's door. Moreover, the influence of its missionary zeal upon the benighted heathen has probably been greater than that of any comparable area on earth.

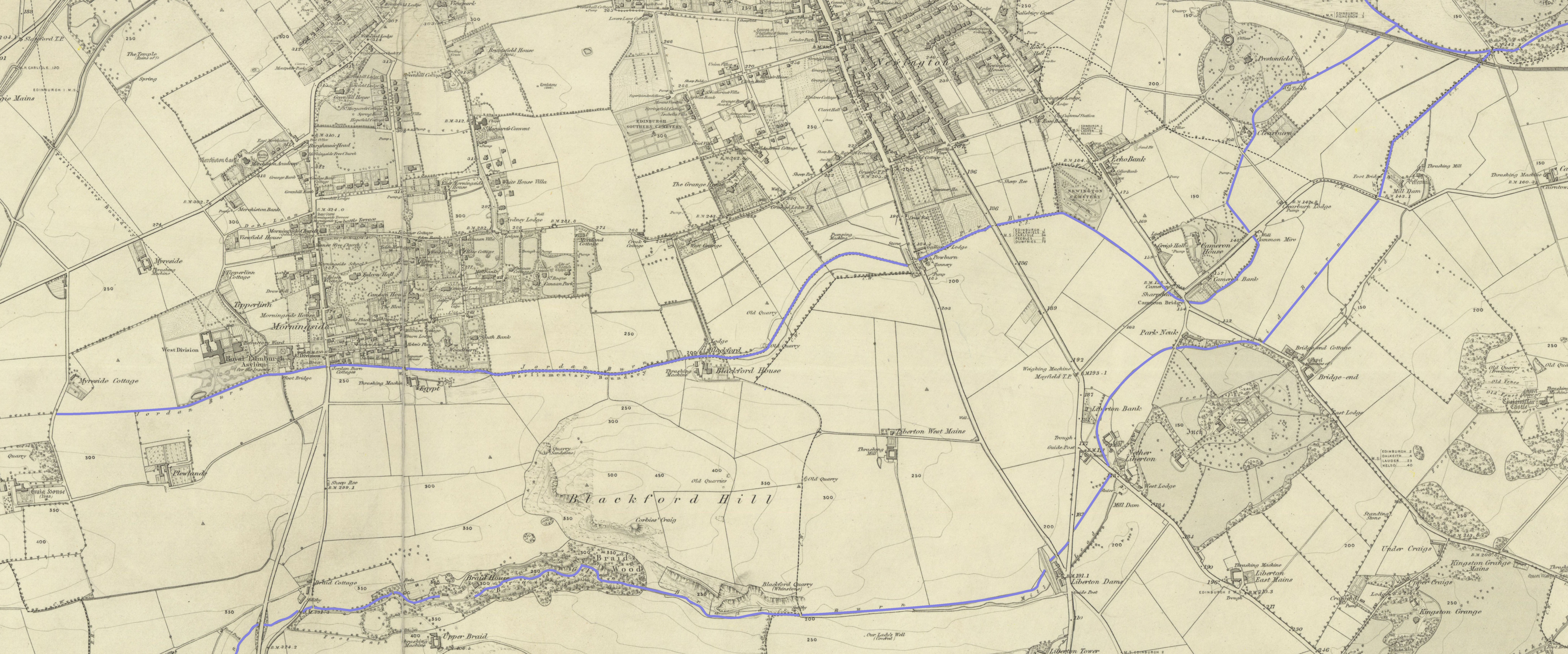

The Jordan Burn/Pow Burn (above) and the Braid Burn (below) from Ordnance Survey maps of 1854–1855, before Jordan and Pow Burns were culveted. The confluence of the Pow Burn with the Braid Burn is at top right.
