= Mayfield, Scotland =

Mayfield, Scotland can refer to:

- Mayfield, Edinburgh
- Mayfield, Midlothian
