= Mark McInnes, Baron McInnes of Kilwinning =

Scottish Conservative politician

The Right Honourable The Lord McInnes of Kilwinning CBE
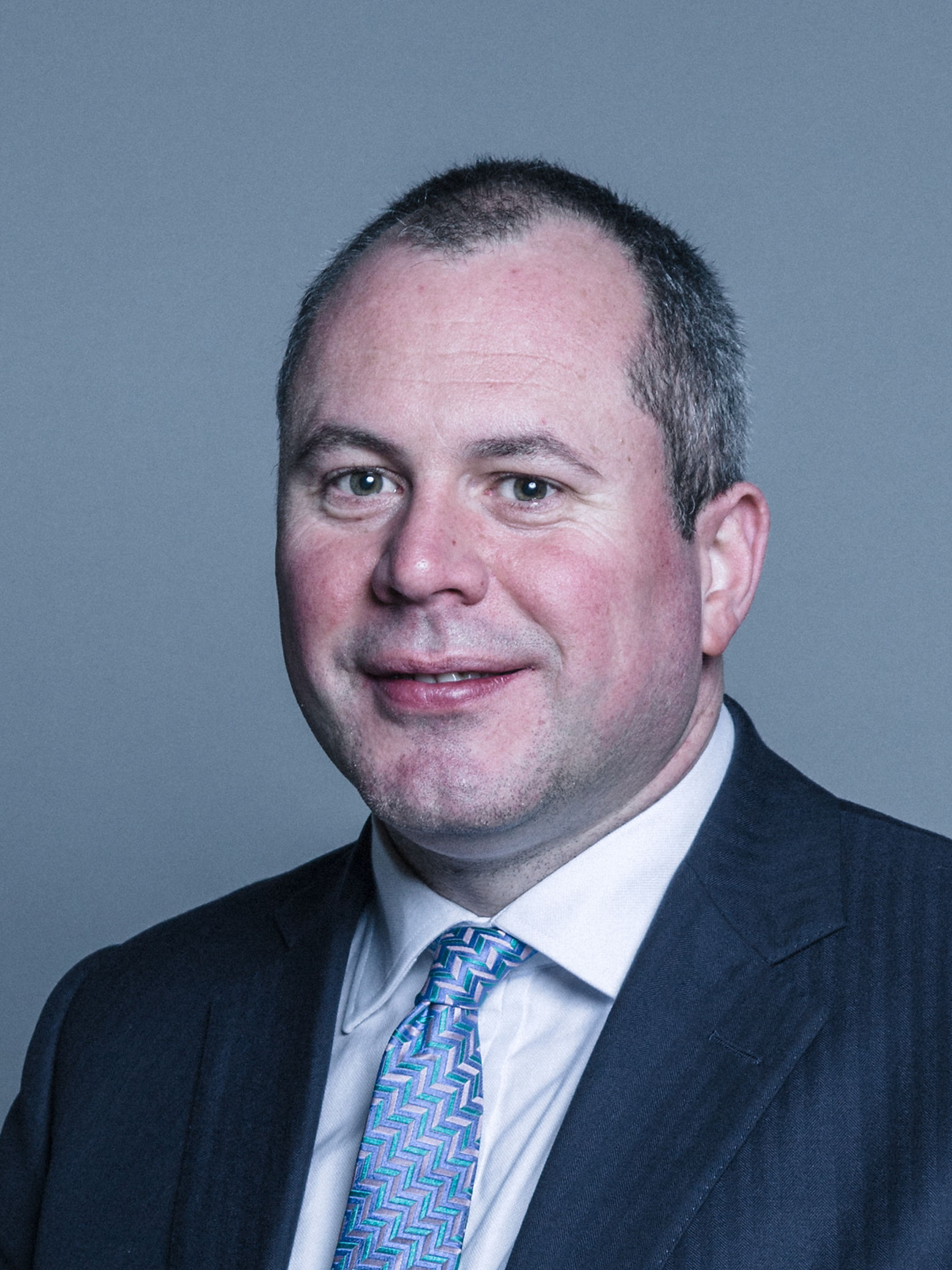
- Official portrait, 2017

Member of the House of Lords
- Lord Temporal
- Life peerage 1 September 2016

Personal details
- Born: 4 November 1976 (age 49)
- Party: Conservative
- Education: Kilwinning Academy
- Alma mater: University of Edinburgh

Mark McInnes, Baron McInnes of Kilwinning, CBE (born 4 November 1976) is a Scottish Conservative politician and member of the House of Lords. He is the current Chief Executive of Conservative Campaign Headquarters.

He was educated at Kilwinning Academy and the University of Edinburgh (MA, 1998).

== Political career ==
McInnes was the director of the Scottish Conservative Party and was a Councillor for the Meadows/Morningside ward of Edinburgh City Council.

McInnes was appointed a Commander of the Order of the British Empire (CBE) in the 2016 New Year Honours.

McInnes was included in the list of nominations for life peerages in the 2016 Prime Minister's Resignation Honours. He was created Baron McInnes of Kilwinning, of Kilwinning in the County of Ayrshire on the morning of 1 September.

Orders of precedence in the United Kingdom
Preceded by The Lord Gadhia	Gentlemen; Baron McInnes of Kilwinning	Followed by The Lord Kirkhope of Harrogate
