= Hermitage of Braid =

Coordinates: 55.9199°N 3.2009°W

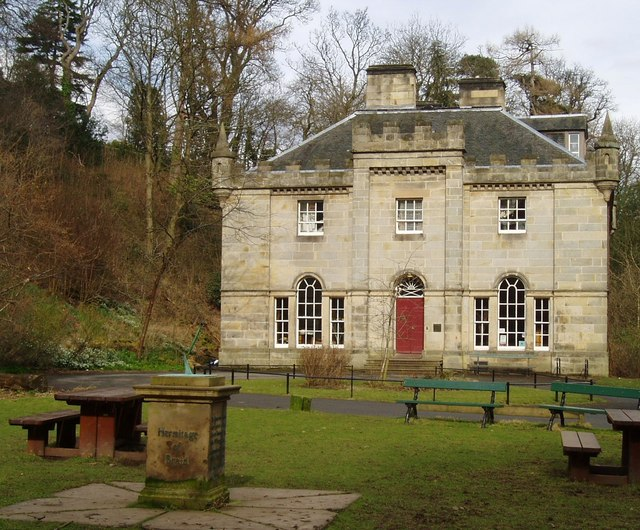
Hermitage of Braid, the 18th-century house which gives the area its name

The Hermitage of Braid (Scottish Gaelic: Dìseart a' Bhràghad) is an area between the Braid Hills and Blackford Hill in Edinburgh, Scotland. The Braid Burn runs through it and it has large sections of forest and paths for walking. It comprises part of the 60.3-hectare (149-acre) Hermitage of Braid and Blackford Hill Local Nature Reserve, as well as the former Braid estate and country house. Within the public nature reserve and forest, there is also a small community garden, which has medicinal plants, culinary plants and other wildflowers (it is set on the site of the former garden of Braid House). The garden (restored in 2014) is organised by a community group, the 'Friends of the Hermitage of Braid and Blackford Hill'.

== History ==
The Braid estate was the property of the de Brad family, one of whom, Henri de Brad, was Sheriff of Edinburgh in the 12th century. A castle stood on the estate until the 18th century. In the 18th century the estate was purchased by the lawyer Charles Gordon of Cluny (died 1814), who commissioned the present house, known as Hermitage of Braid or Hermitage House, which stands on the north side of the Braid Burn.

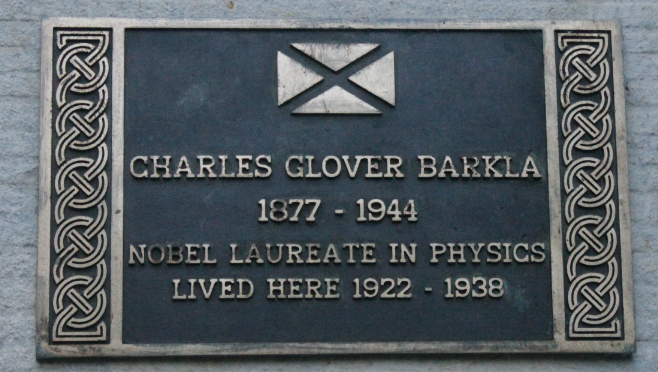
A sign by the door of the estate notes that Nobel Prize winning physicist Charles Barkla lived at the house from 1922 until 1938.

The house was built in 1785 by the Edinburgh architect Robert Burn. The castellated style may have been influenced by the work of Robert Adam. Charles Gordon's son was the soldier and MP Colonel John Gordon (c.1776–1858). The house is a category A listed building. The nearby doocot is category B listed, has 1,965 stone nesting boxes and is the second largest in Edinburgh.

In 1937, the then owner of the Hermitage, John McDougal, gifted the land to the city for use as a public park. A pillar in the grounds records the gift, and the subsequent opening of the park on 10 June 1938 by Lord Provost Sir Louis Gumley. The house now hosts the City of Edinburgh Council's Parks (Natural Heritage) department, including Pentland Hills Regional Park staff.
