= Braid Hills =

Hills and suburb near Edinburgh, Scotland

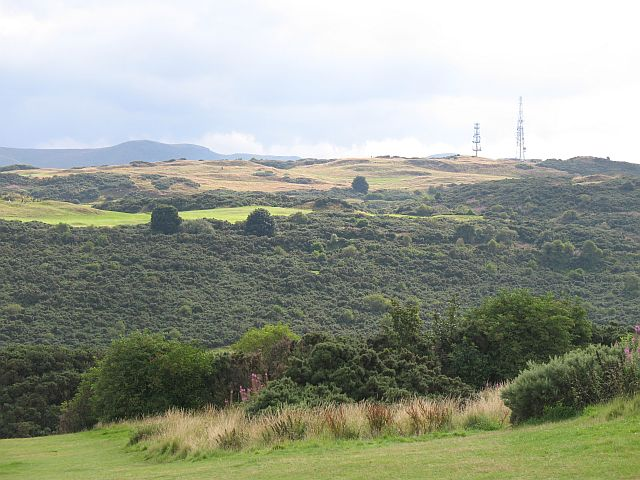
- View of the Braid Hills from Blackford Hill

Highest point
- Coordinates: 55°54′43″N 3°11′49″W

Geography
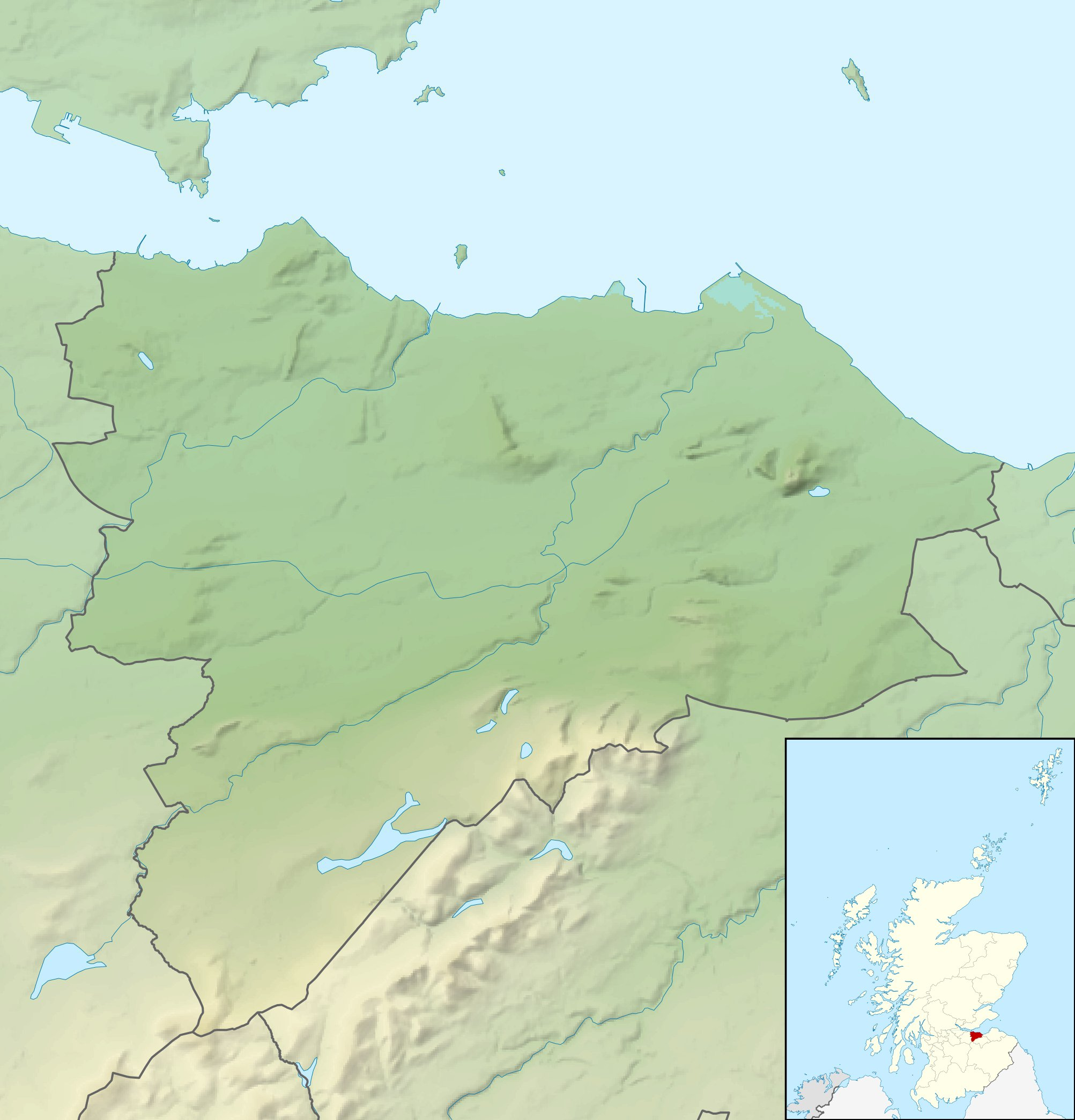
- Location within Edinburgh Location within the City of Edinburgh council area Location within Scotland
- Location: Edinburgh, Scotland

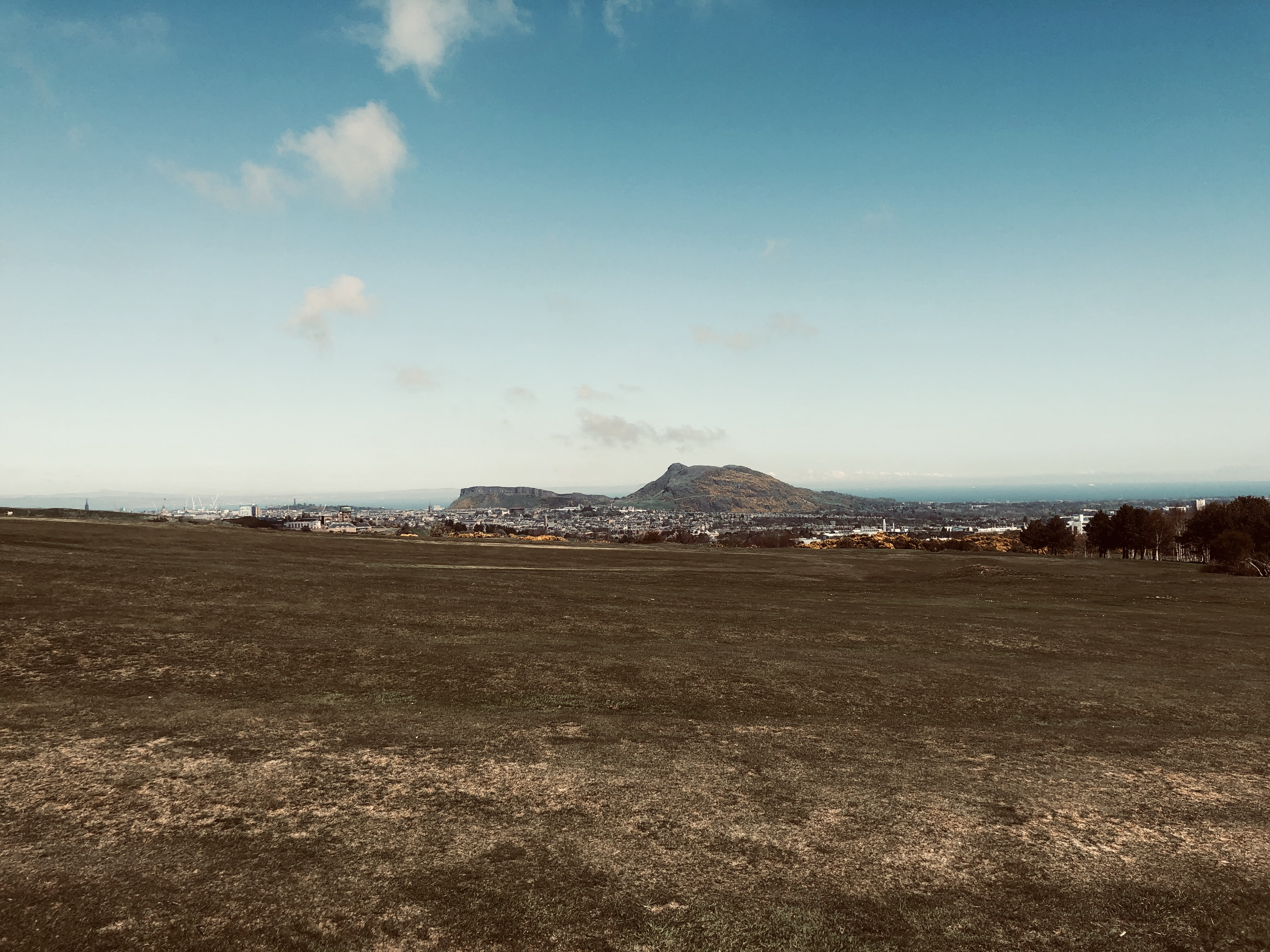
View of Edinburgh City from Braid Hills

The Braid Hills form an area towards the south-western edge of Edinburgh, Scotland.

The hills themselves are largely open space. Housing in the area is mostly confined to detached villas, and some large terraced houses. The Braid Hills Hotel sits above Pentland Terrace and Comiston Road, overlooking the park across the road.

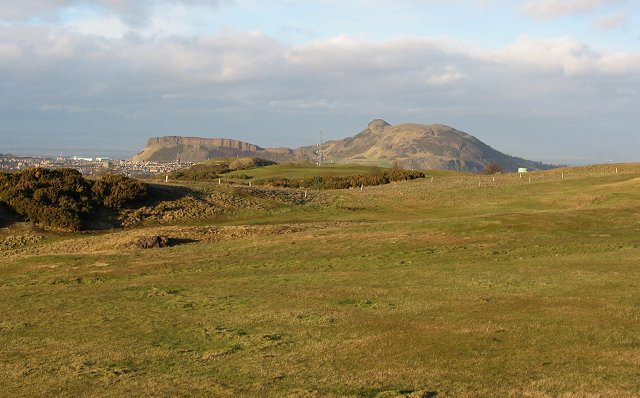
Braid Hills, with Arthur's Seat prominently visible in the background

The area is well known for its golf course and its views of the city, and is a popular destination for families taking children sledging in the winter. There is also a riding stables and school, eastwards towards Liberton, which arranges pony trekking.

Nearby areas are Morningside to the north, Comiston to the west, and Liberton to the east.

The core of the name is shared with the Braid Burn and the nearby Hermitage of Braid woodland park.
