= John Nicoll (chronicler) =

Scottish chronicler

John Nicoll (c.1590–1668), was a Scottish chronicler who recorded the political events of his day which were later published and are used as a primary source by historians.

== Biography ==
Nicoll according to statements in his chronicle was born and brought up in Glasgow, the year of his birth being probably 1590. He became a member of the Society of Writers to the Signet on 19 October 1609. He was a public notary in Edinburgh and he seems to have enjoyed the confidence of the Covenanters. However, he maintained a link Glasgow becoming a burgess of the city in 1615, before becoming a burgess of Edinburgh in 1619. Not improbably he was the John Nicoll who was nominated as clerk to the general assembly at Glasgow in November 1638, when Sir Archibald Johnstone of Warriston was elected.

Nicoll composed his chronicle partly from notes of what happened within his immediate experience, and partly from accounts in the newspapers and public intelligencers of the time. His political bias varies with the changes of the government, the proceedings and conduct of those in power being always placed in the best light. He probably died not long after 1667.

== Works ==
Wodrow, who in his Sufferings of the Kirk makes large use of the manuscript of Nicoll, described it in the list of his papers as The Journals of John Nicol, writer to the signet, containing some account of our Scots Kings, with some Extracts as to China and the West Indies, and a Chronicle from Fergus the first to 1562. And an Abbreviāt of Matters in Scotland from that time to 1637; from which it contains full and large accounts of all the Occurrences in Scotland, with the Proclamations and Public Papers every year. Vol. i. from 1637 to 1649, original; vol. ii. from 1650 to 1657. Volume one has been lost. Volume two was purchased for the Advocates' Library, Edinburgh, and was printed by the Bannatyne Club in 1836, under the title A Diary of Public Transactions and other Occurrences, chiefly in Scotland, from June 1650 to June 1667.

== Family ==
On 21 October 1606 Nicoll married Bessie the daughter of James Thomson (an Edinburgh merchant). His first wife died in August 1627 and on 12 December the same year he married Magdalene, daughter of Andrew Hutchison (another Edinburgh merchant).
