= Burghmuirhead =

Area of Edinburgh, Scotland

Coordinates: 55°56′00″N 3°12′36″W

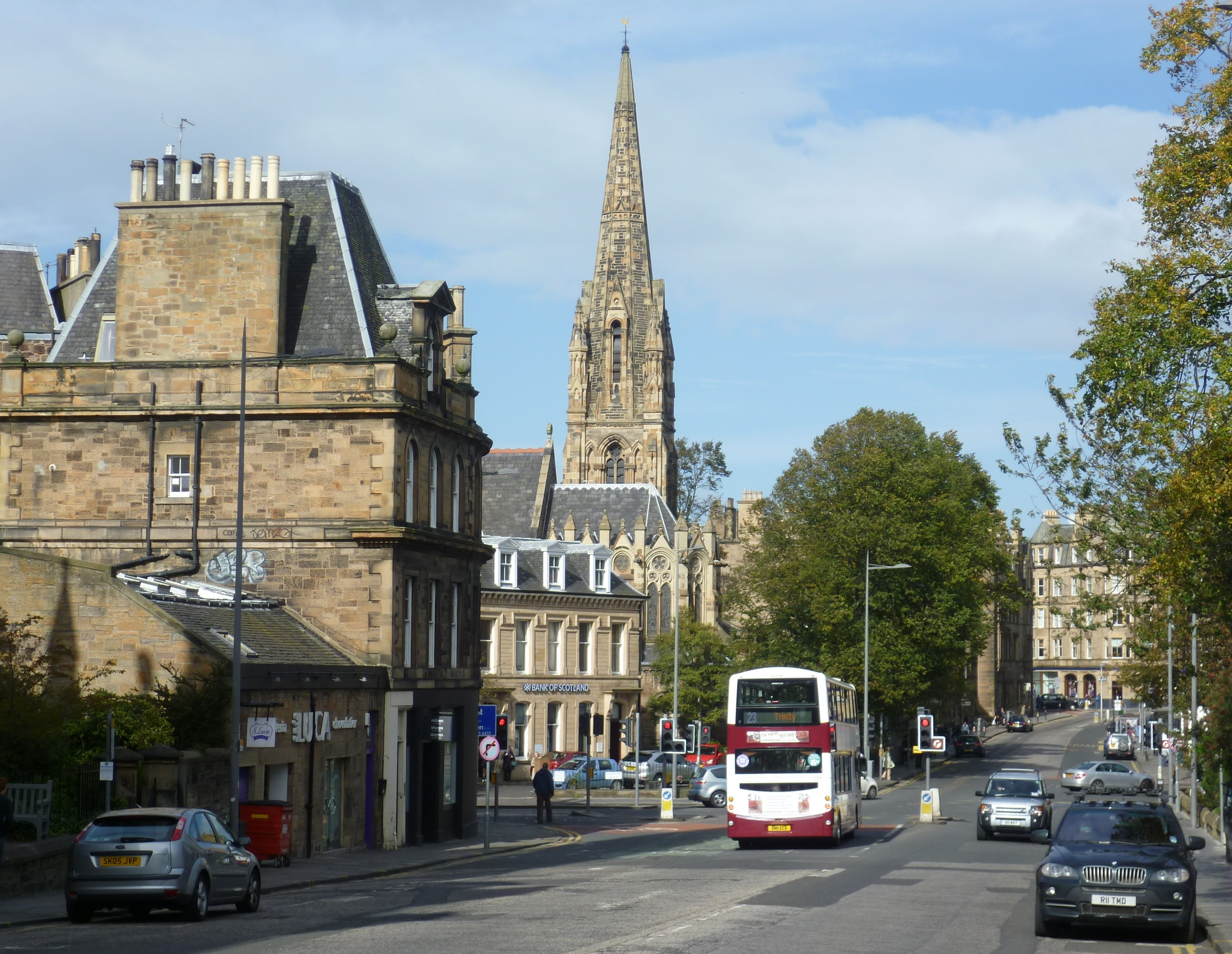
Burghmuirhead

Burghmuirhead (sometimes anglicised as Boroughmuirhead) is an area of Edinburgh, Scotland.

The area lies between Bruntsfield to the north and Morningside to the south. West is Merchiston and east is Greenhill and then The Grange.

The area was once part of the lands of Greenhill. It takes its name from the Burgh Muir, an area of oak forest which stretched over much of today's south Edinburgh; all that now remains is the parkland of Bruntsfield Links.

The anglicised form of the name was used for Boroughmuirhead Post Office which closed in 2010 (replaced by Bruntsfield Post Office in Bruntsfield Place), and also was the former name of the now Grangebank House, located down a lane to the west of Morningside Road.

Today the names Holy Corner and Church Hill are more commonly used to describe the respective northern and southern parts of Burghmuirhead.
