= Kilwinning Academy =

Location
- Dalry Road; Kilwinning, Ayrshire, KA13 7HD; Scotland; 55.655°N 4.702°W

Information
- Type: Secondary School
- Motto: Forward Together
- Established: 1977
- Headteacher: Timothy Swan
- Depute Head Teachers: J Milne, T Mair & C Shaw
- Staff: 80 +
- Years offered: S1-S6
- Gender: Mixed
- Age: 11 to 18
- Enrollment: 900 +
- Houses: Arran; Bute; Cumbrae; Davaar
- Colours: Royal Blue; Gold
- Feeder schools: Abbey Primary, Blacklands Primary, Corsehill Primary, Pennyburn Primary and Whitehirst Park Primary
- Website: www.kilwinningacademy.com

Kilwinning Academy is a six-year, non-denominational, secondary school with an agreed capacity of 1,330 in Kilwinning, North Ayrshire, Scotland.

The current building opened to 1st year pupils in 1976, then to 1st, 2nd and a few 3rd year pupils in 1977 before finally opening to all other school years the following year.

== Rectors and head teachers ==
- D Young (1977—1987) — left/retired early
- J Happs (1987—1989) — acting head teacher
- W Ballantyne (1989—2002) — retired
- W C Armstrong (2002—2011) — retired
- T Swan (2011—2024)
- C McEvoy (2025) — acting head teacher
- T Mair (2026) — acting head teacher

In 2013 a teacher at the school was struck off for making inappropriate remarks to pupils.

In 2014 the school was awarded £4000 to support a scheme to get more people involved in sports.

== School building ==
Kilwinning Academy is rated B for the building's condition and sustainability.

== Town regeneration ==
Kilwinning Academy S2 Art and Design pupils in 2010/11 helped Irvine Bay Regeneration in their efforts to refurbish Kilwinning's town centre by creating tiles for a mural for a tunnel leading from the shops and Abbey to the car park.
