= Braid Burn =

River in Edinburgh, Scotland

Coordinates: 55.9405°N 3.13128°W

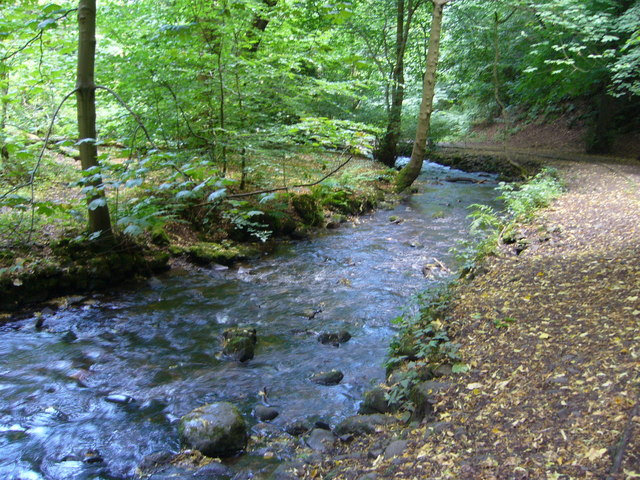
- The Braid Burn in the Hermitage of Braid
- Native name: Scottish Gaelic: Allt a' Bhràghad

Physical characteristics
- Source
  - location: Pentland Hills
- Mouth
  - location: Portobello
- Length: 14 km (8.7 mi)
- Basin size: 30.5 km^{2} (11.8 sq mi)

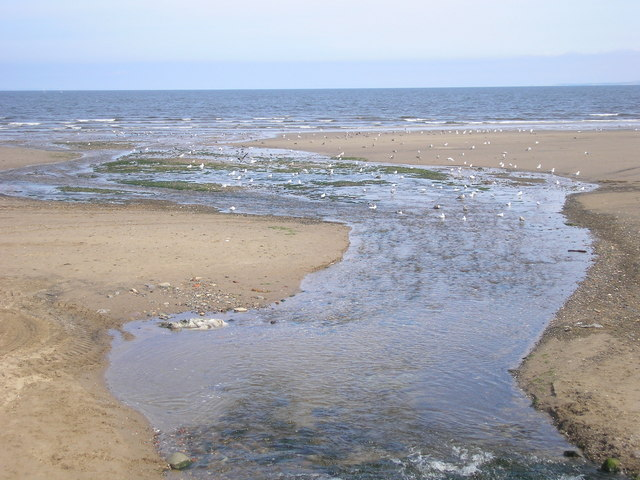
The Braid Burn (called the Figgate Burn towards its end) enters the sea

The Braid Burn (Scottish Gaelic: Allt a' Bhràghad) is a burn or stream 14 kilometres (8.7 mi) in length that flows through south and east Edinburgh.

== Course ==
The burn forms near Bonaly in the Pentland Hills south west of the city, at the confluence of the Bonaly and Howden burns. From there, it flows in a generally north easterly direction, skirting the Braid Hills to the east and south, and then via Braidburn Valley Park, the Hermitage of Braid, Blackford Glen, Cameron Toll and Inch Park. At Peffermill it is joined by the Jordan Burn. At Duddingston its name changes to the Figgate Burn. It enters the Firth of Forth at Portobello.

The area drained by the burn and its tributaries amounts to 30.5 square kilometres (11.8 sq mi). The burn rises quickly after rain, and can become very large when in spate. Eighty per cent of its catchment area is in the lower urban section, the other portion being south of the Edinburgh City Bypass.

Part of its course is in a gorge cut by glacial meltwater that exposed a weakness in the rock. Before this, the burn took a more southerly course around Blackford Hill. The gorge prevented the building of houses along parts of the course, so the burn flows for several miles through parkland.

== Wildlife ==
The burn contains small trout and bullhead, and otters are occasionally seen in the burn.

== Flood prevention ==
The burn has a history of flooding, and major events occurred on 3 January 1982, 28 May 1983, 3 November 1984, 6 October 1990, 7 October 1993, 26–27 April 2000, 7–8 November 2000, and in October 2002.

After the flooding in 2000, the City of Edinburgh Council elected to install a flood prevention scheme along much of the stream's length. Walls and embankments were constructed at points along the length of the burn, and new culverts and bridges were installed, and alterations to upstream reservoirs in the Pentland Hills were carried out. Parks and golf courses were modified to store water in the event of a flood.

The scheme was completed in 2010 at a construction cost of £28.7 million, an increase from the estimated cost of £22 million. The total cost of the scheme was £43 million.

The scheme is designed to withstand 1 in 200 year event, and provides protection to around 900 properties.

== In Literature ==
The burn is mentioned in Muriel Spark's novel, The Prime of Miss Jean Brodie, when Sandy and Miss Brodie meet after the war at the Braid Hills Hotel: 'They looked out of the wide windows at the little Braid Burn trickling through the fields and at the hills beyond, so austere from everlasting that they had never been capable of losing anything by the war.'

It is also mentioned in a line in a Gaelic poem by George Campbell Hay, written when he lived in Edinburgh, called Cnoc an Àtha Dhuibh (the Gaelic for Blackford Hill).
