= Church Hill, Edinburgh =

Street and surrounding area in Edinburgh, Scotland

Coordinates: 55°55′57″N 3°12′35″W

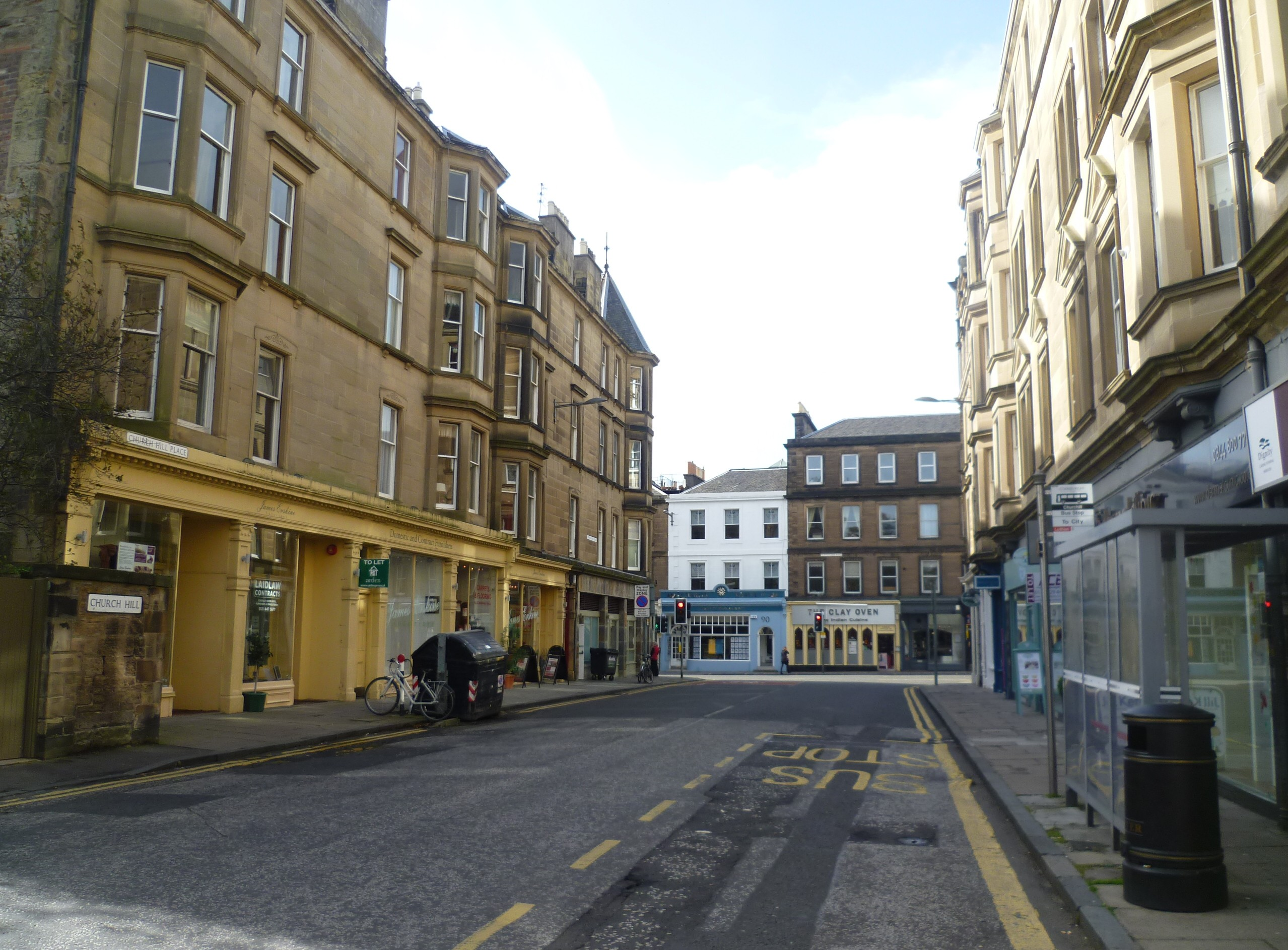
Church Hill looking towards Morningside Road

Church Hill is a street and small surrounding area in Edinburgh, Scotland.

== Geography ==
It lies immediately to the north of Morningside and south of Bruntsfield; technically it is part of Burghmuirhead, together with Holy Corner. All of Burghmuirhead was once part of the lands of Greenhill. The original Burghmuirhead House remains at the end of a lane on the west side of Morningside Road near Church Hill (the street) itself. To the west is Merchiston and east are Greenhill and The Grange. The area is mainly Georgian and Victorian villas, and Victorian tenements, often with shops at ground-floor level.

The area is affluent, as with much of south Edinburgh, with a mixture of residential and retail buildings.

== Church Hill Theatre ==
Church Hill Theatre, a prominent red sandstone building, is a former church building close to the top of the hill itself.
