= Greenhill, Edinburgh =

Suburb of Edinburgh, Scotland

Coordinates: 55°56′2″N 3°12′28″W

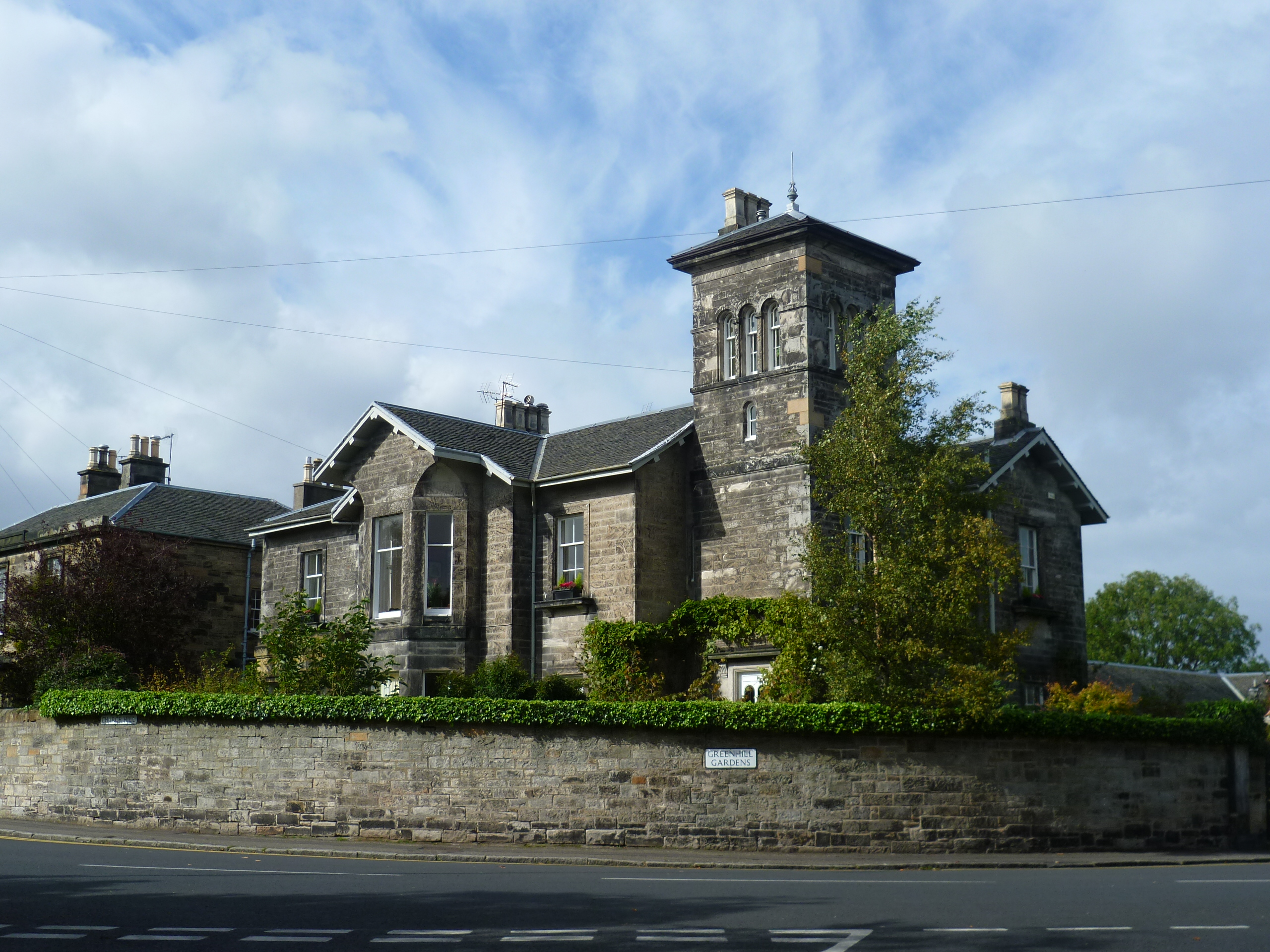
Victorian villa at Greenhill

Greenhill is a small area of Edinburgh, the capital of Scotland. Situated south of the city centre, Greenhill is normally taken to be part of Bruntsfield, which skirts it to the north. Greenhill borders Marchmont and The Grange to the east, Morningside to the south, and Merchiston, beyond Holy Corner, to the west. It comprises a mixture of Georgian and Victorian villas and some tenement housing.

== History ==
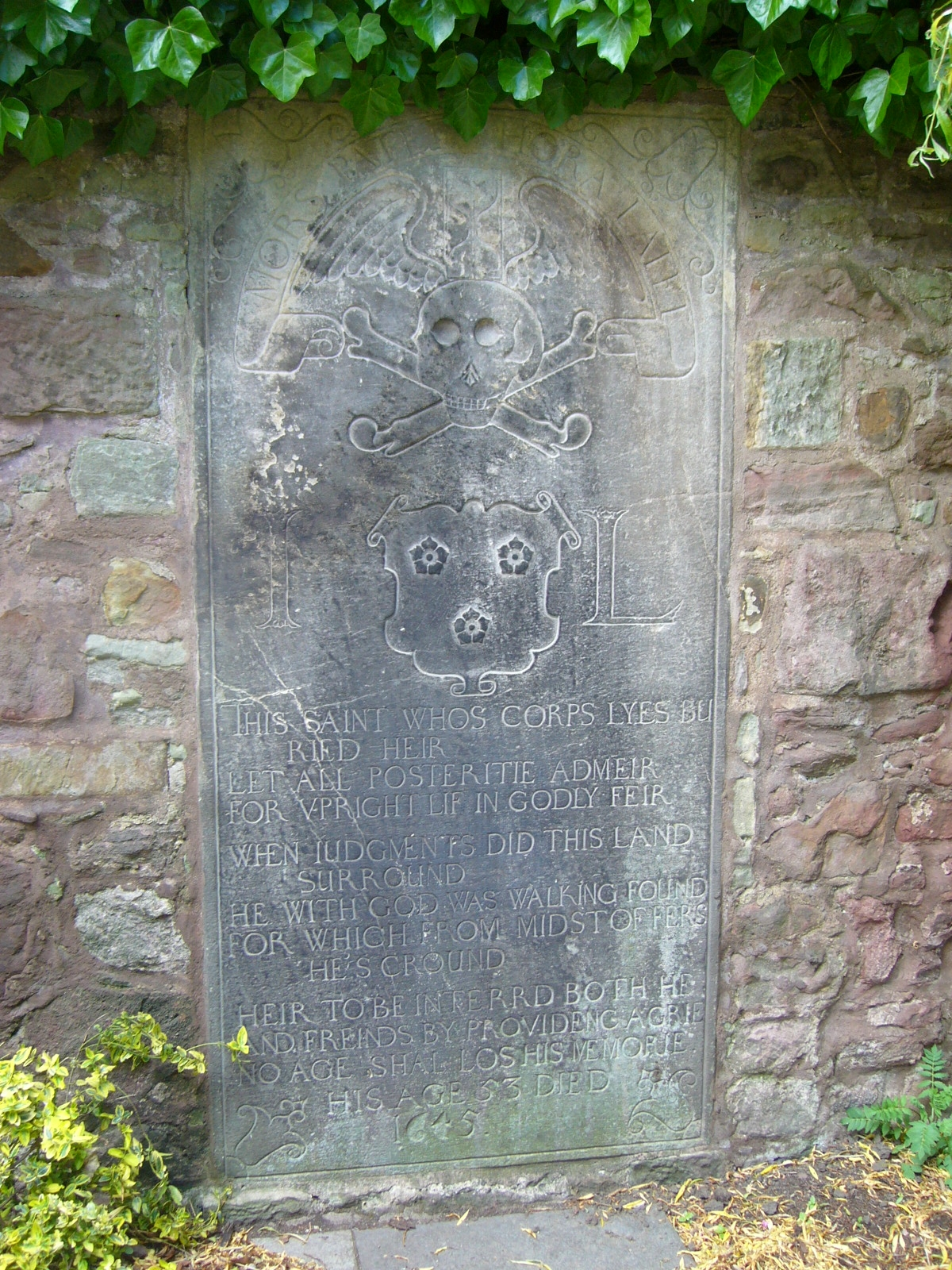
Livingstone Mausoleum

The name derives from the former estate of Greenhill, which was one of the original lots purchased when the Edinburgh magistrates feued the Burgh Muir in 1586. The owner was Thomas Aikenhead, an Edinburgh merchant. Two further lots were later added to the original portion of Greenhill, including the ground that became known as Burghmuirhead, and sold to separate owners, one of whom was William Rig. Aikenhead was a skinner (glover) by occupation and held the positions of councillor, bailie and Dean of Guild. In 1636, the estate was sold to John Livingston, an Edinburgh apothecary whose family had become connected to the Aikenheads by marriage. His wife, Elizabeth Rig, appears to have been a relation of William Rig above.

== Famous Residents ==
- Robert McVitie (1854-1910) creator of McVitie's Biscuits lived at 12 Greenhill Gardens
- Ron Flockhart (racing driver) (1923-1962) won Le Mans twice driving Jaguar D-Types (1956 and 1957) for the Edinburgh-based Ecurie Ecosse team. He and his parents lived at 8 Greenhill Gardens. He raced in Formula 1, was a test driver for Connaught and BRM teams and also an aviation man who flew his own aircraft to races. He was killed at Kallista on the outskirts of Melbourne, Australia in 1962 while preparing for his second attempt at the Sydney to London record for a single engined aircraft. He became lost in fog and slammed into the Dandenong Ranges, dying instantly.

== Historical Features ==
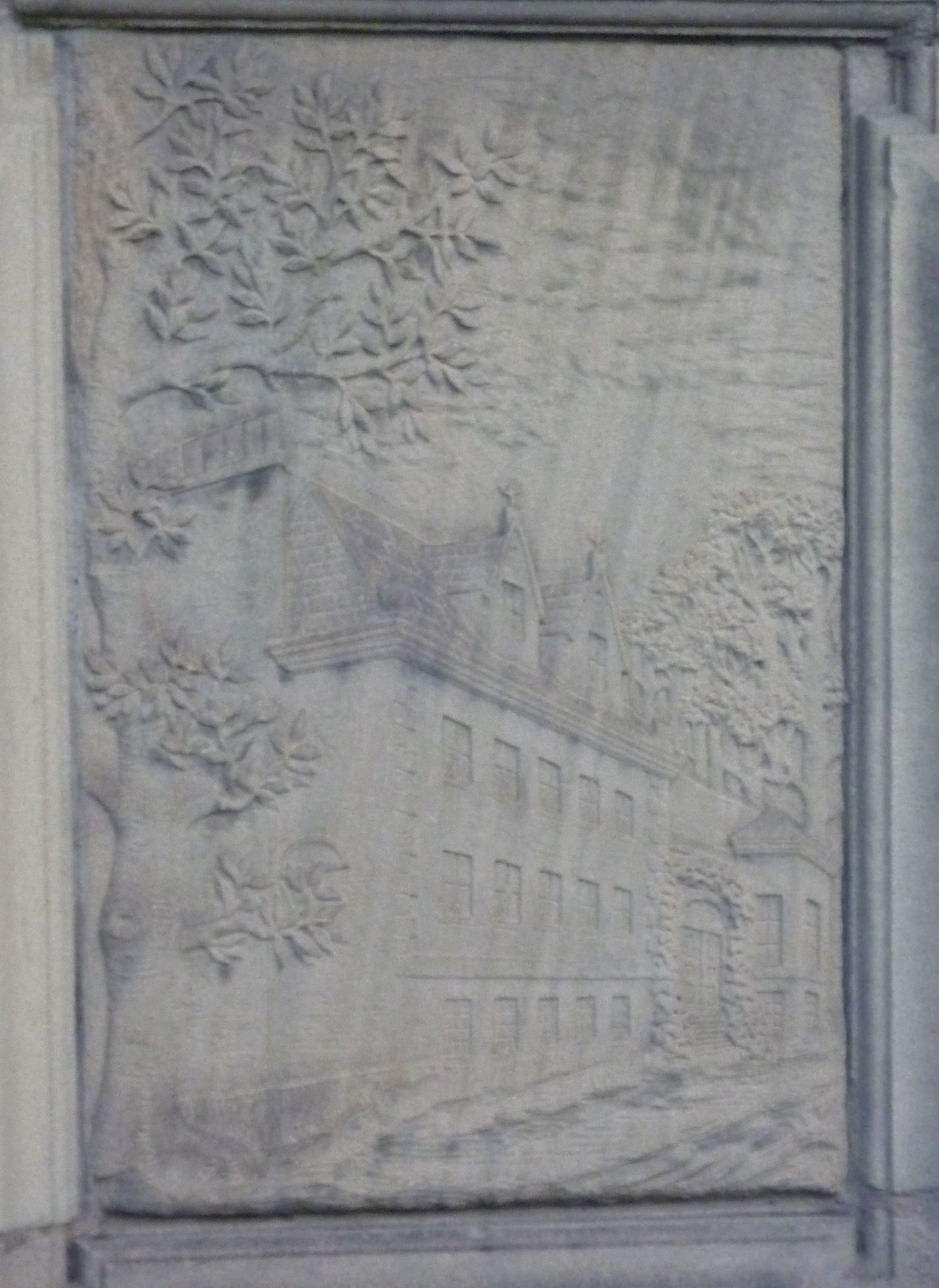
Greenhill House depicted on a tenement builder's tablet

A stone carving depicting the former manor house may still be seen on the wall of a tenement house at the corner of Bruntsfield Place and Bruntsfield Gardens.

A walled, roofless structure rebuilt some time after 1894 is the mausoleum of John Livingstone, an apothecary and former laird of the estate. It was paid for by his widow Elizabeth Rig. It stood in the grounds of the manor house before its demolition and is now situated adjacent to a smaller private Victorian villa. A tombstone carries the date 1645. The roughly square area contains an information plaque, memorial bench, and plants. Its continued existence was the subject of a bitter legal dispute after the villa changed ownership.

== Parking ==
In 2006 the Greenhill area was brought into the "S2" (southern zone 2) controlled parking zone, making the majority of roadside parking available only to residents paying Council Tax and purchasing a permit. This was done in conjunction with an expansion of the controlled parking zone across the city (see transport in Edinburgh).

== See also ==
- Foot-Ball Club
