= Mayfield, Edinburgh =

Suburb of Edinburgh, Scotland

Coordinates: 55°55′56.63″N 3°10′37.77″W

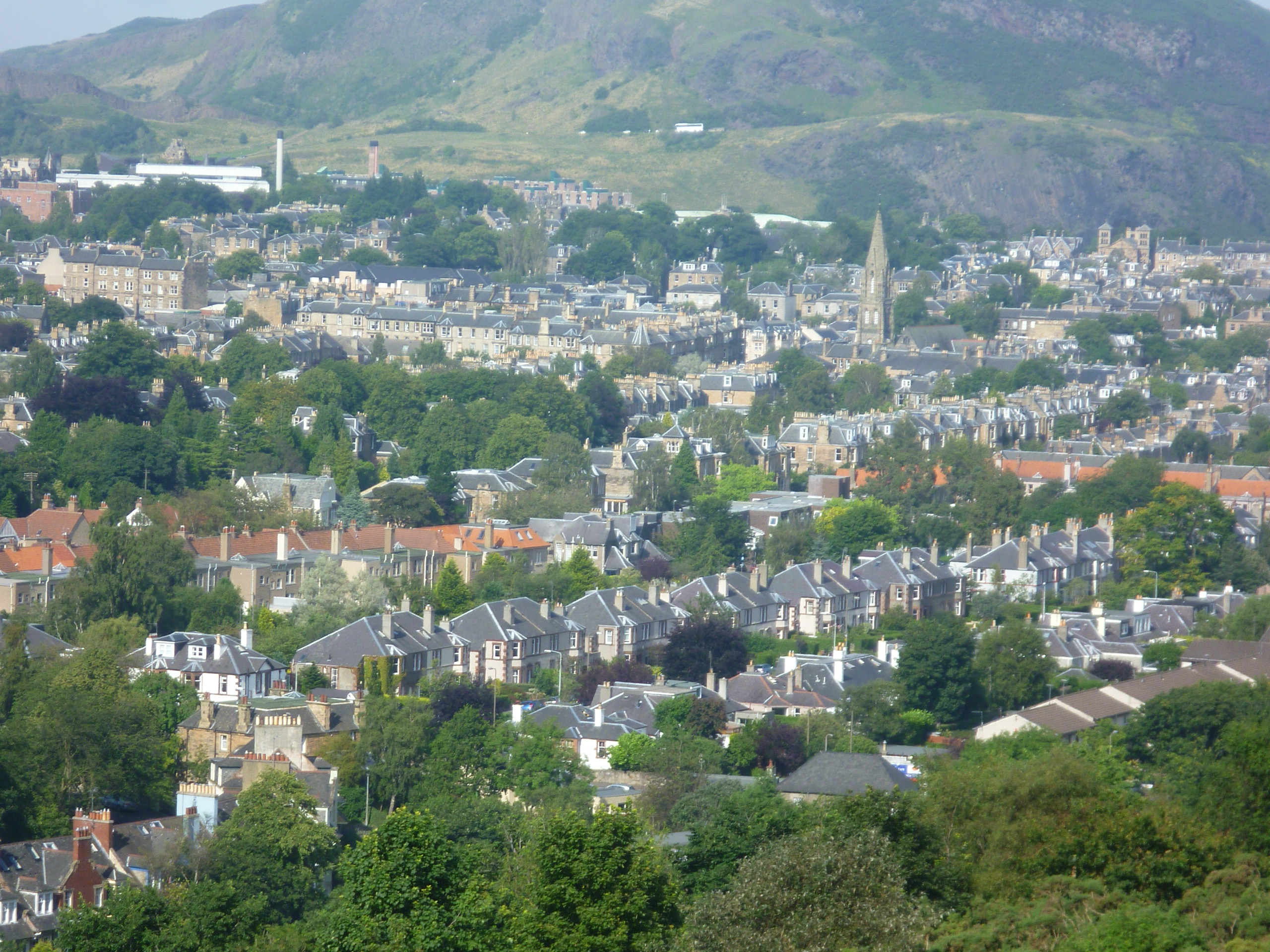
The Mayfield area from Blackford Hill

Mayfield is an area of Edinburgh, Scotland, about one mile south from the city centre, with Craigmillar to the south-east and Newington to the north. Mayfield is also the name of several streets in the area.

The area is affluent and mostly residential, with a large number of small hotels, a few shops, and an NHS dentist on Mayfield Road.

== Church ==
The area is dominated by Mayfield Salisbury Church (now renamed Newington Trinity). The church was designed by Hippolyte Jean Blanc and opened in 1879. It was named ‘Mayfield North’ from 1929 to 1957, then ‘Mayfield & Fountainhall’ from 1957 to 1968, then 'Mayfield Church' from 1968 to 1993, then 'Mayfield Salisbury' from 1993 to 2024 when it finally become known as Newington Trinity Church.
