= Holy Corner =

Area of Edinburgh, Scotland

Coordinates: 55°56′2.55″N 3°12′36.97″W

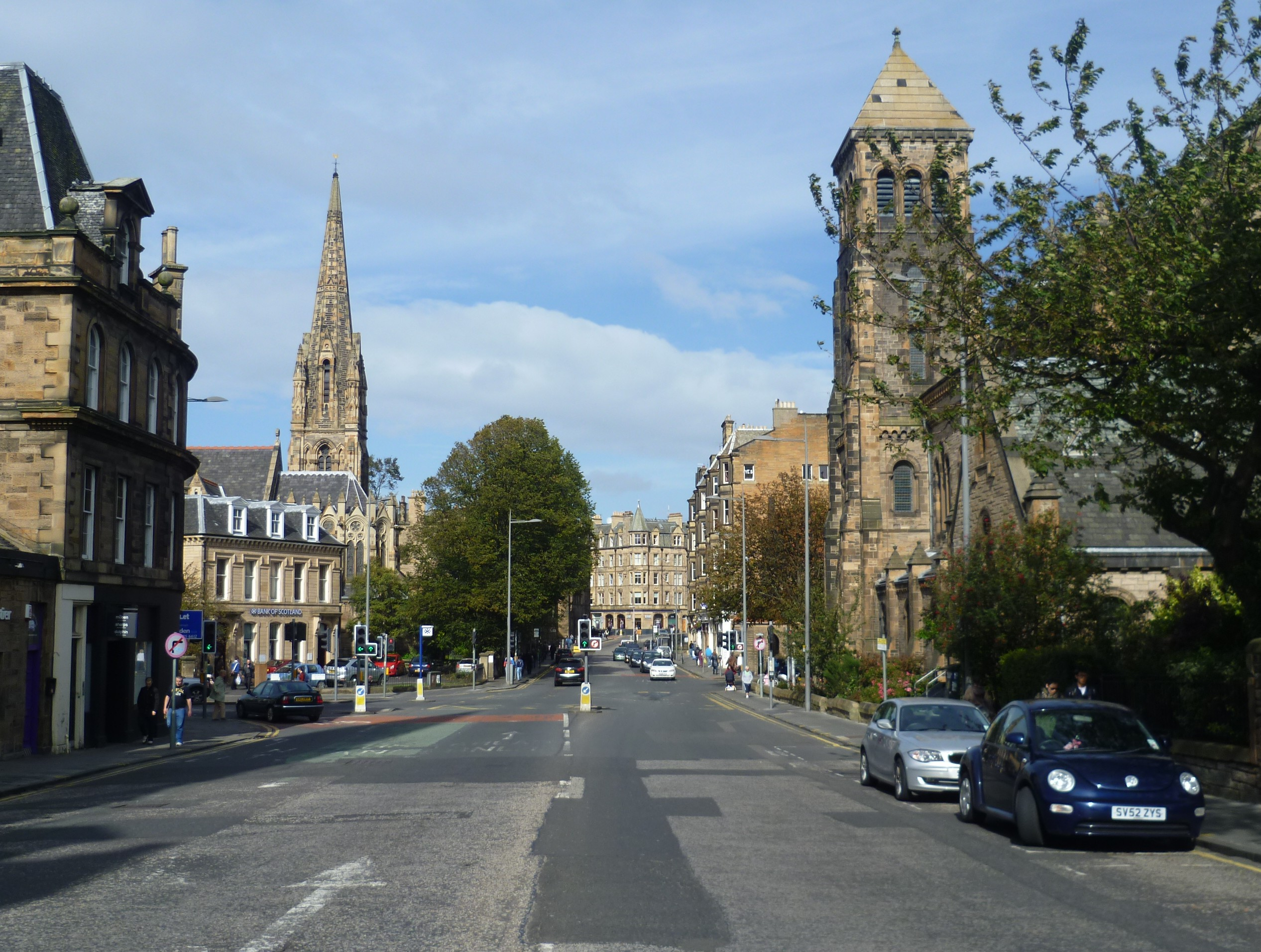
Holy Corner

Holy Corner is a colloquial name for a small area of Edinburgh, Scotland, and (along with Church Hill) is part of the area more properly known as Burghmuirhead, itself part of the lands of Greenhill. Holy Corner lies between the areas of Bruntsfield and Morningside.

== Location ==
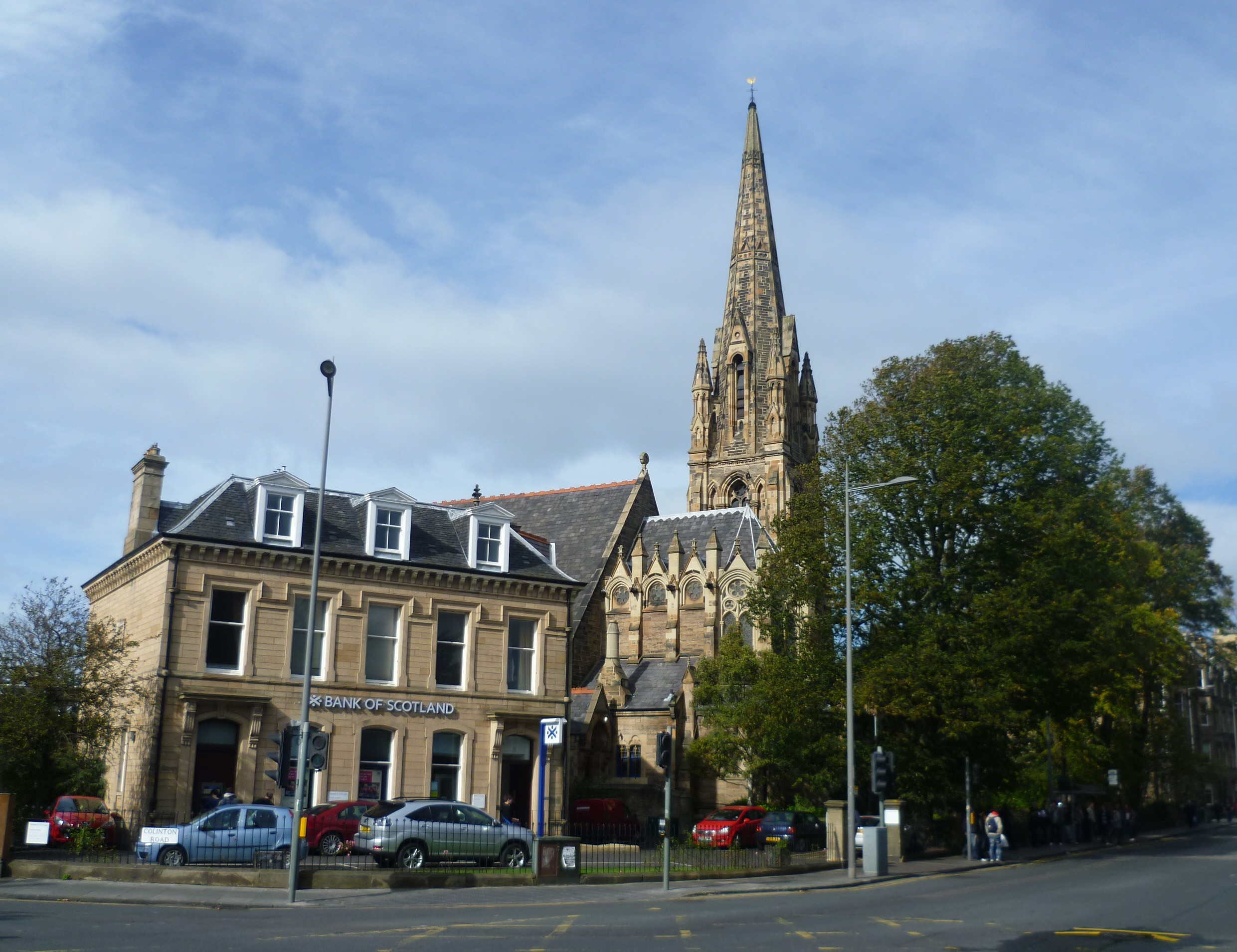
Former Bank of Scotland branch building, and Christ Church

The name derives from the crossroads, where Morningside Road, Colinton Road and Chamberlain Road meet; on each of the corners of the crossroad is a church (although two are slightly set back.) Church Hill is the small area to the south and includes the Church Hill Theatre, formerly yet another church. Beyond is Morningside, with the former parish church (formally part of Napier University, now returned to ecclesiastical use by Chalmers Church) only just beyond Church Hill. The north end of the crossroads leads into Bruntsfield Place. Merchiston is along Colinton Road to the west.

The churches of Holy Corner are: Christ Church (Scottish Episcopal Church), Morningside United (Church of Scotland and United Reformed Church) and Edinburgh Elim (Elim Pentecostal Church) in what was formerly Morningside Baptist Church (the latter is now renamed Central Church and situated at Tollcross). The former North Morningside Parish church at Holy Corner was converted for community use in 1980 and is now called the Eric Liddell Centre after the Olympic athlete who lived locally and attended the former Morningside Congregational Church, now the home of Morningside United Church.

A short distance away atop Church Hill is the Church Hill Theatre which was built as a church by Edinburgh architect Hippolyte Blanc (who also designed Christ Church). Not far beyond that is the former Morningside Parish Church (Church of Scotland) which is now owned by Chalmers Church having been used by Napier University in the interim, the congregation having been merged with the Braid Parish Church towards the south of Morningside in the 1990. The congregation moved again in 2003 to the church on Cluny Gardens as the main centre for Morningside Parish Church.

Other features in the immediate area include Napier University's Merchiston campus, which incorporates Merchiston Castle (or tower), birthplace and former home of John Napier, the mathematician and alleged necromancer. Merchiston Tower is also the ancient seat of Clan Napier.

The former site of a garden centre in the north west corner, next to a branch of the Bank of Scotland, was transformed into a compact "metropolitan" supermarket for Tesco, with adjacent coffee house and furniture shop, in 2006. In 2019, the vacant Bank of Scotland building was transformed into a restaurant known as McLarens on the Corner.

== See also ==
- Holy Corner (Ghent Béguinage) – a place in Belgium, the name of which may be connected to Edinburgh's Holy Corner

== Gallery ==
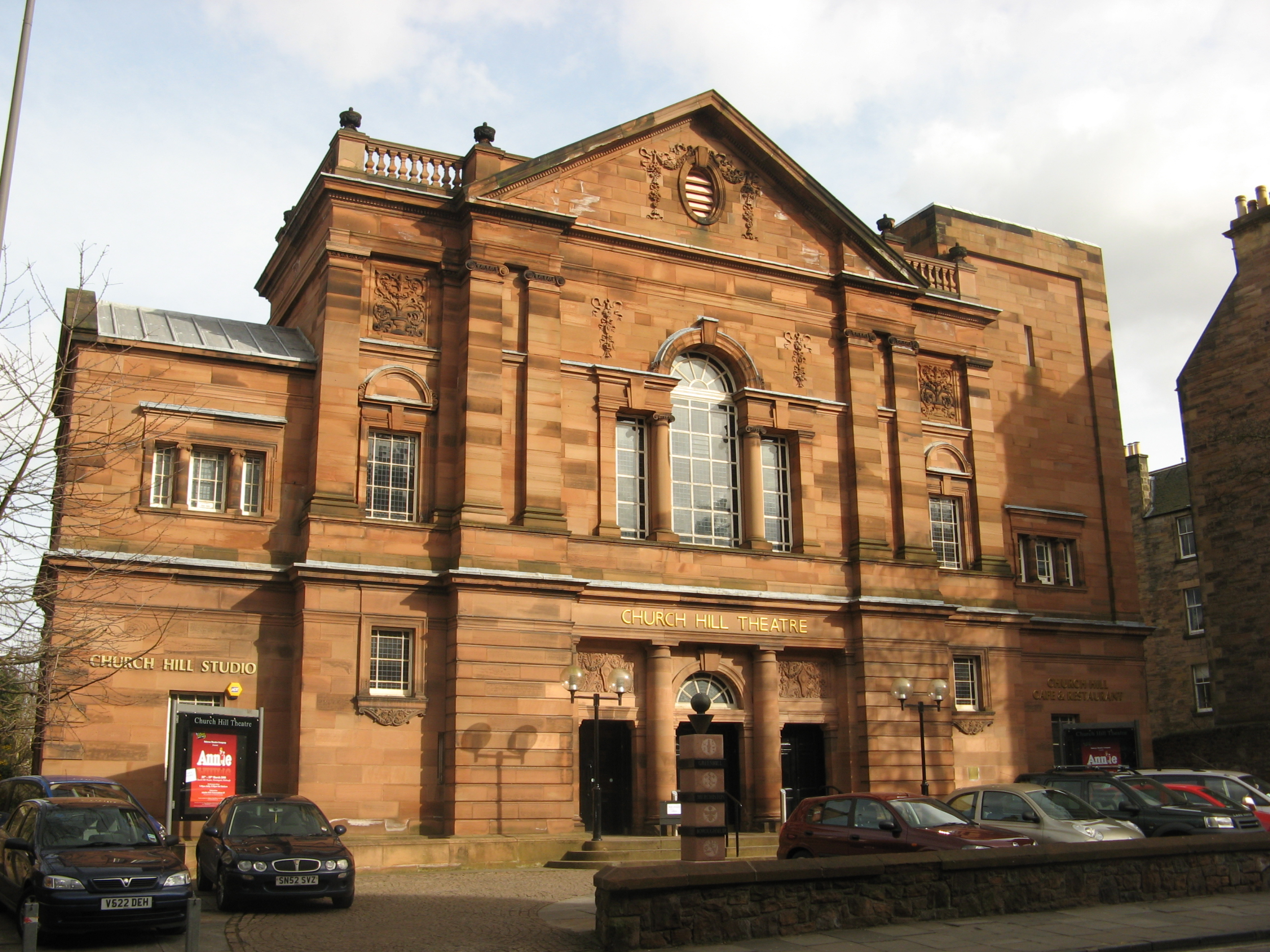
Church Hill Theatre (former Free Church), Burghmuirhead

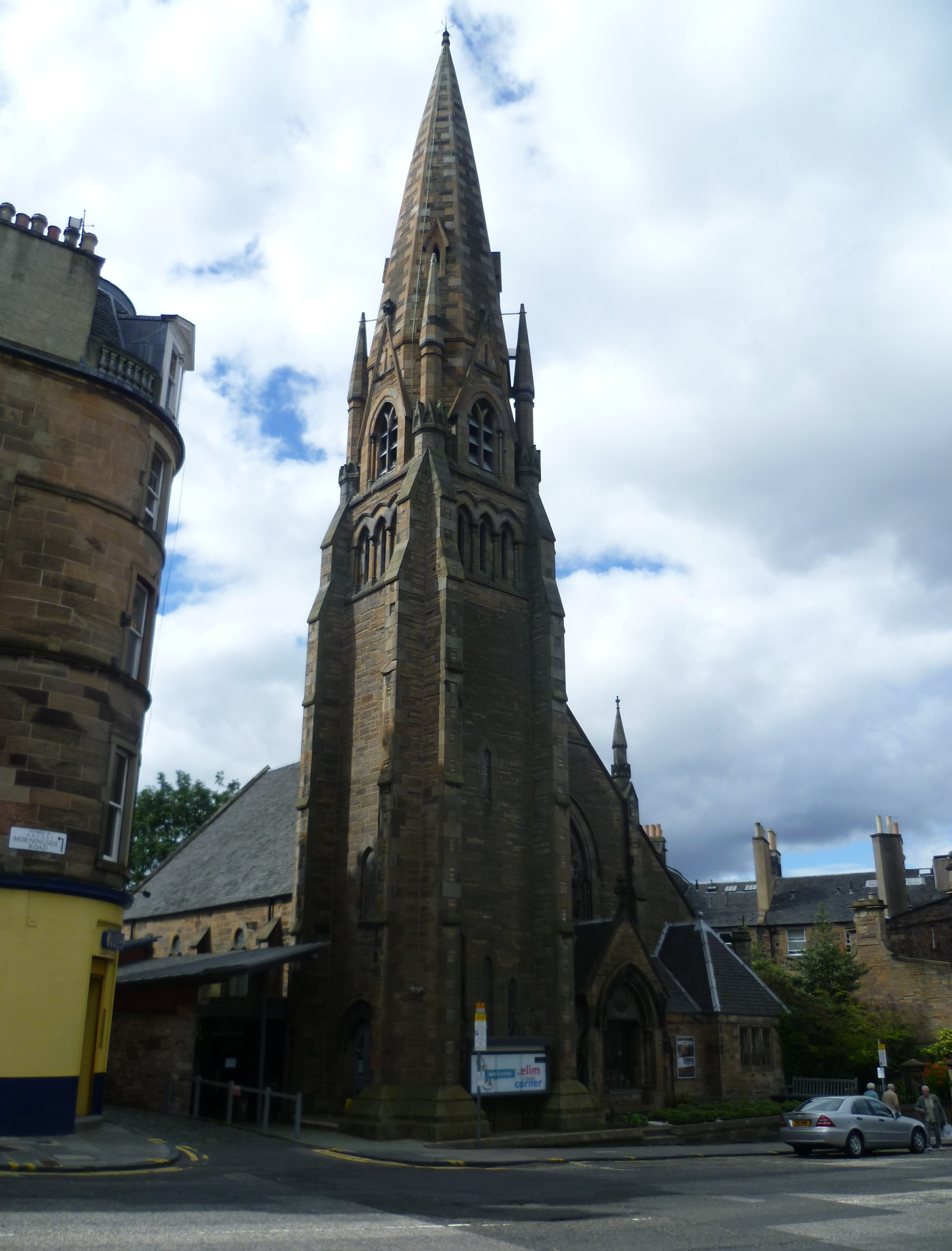
Morningside Baptist Church, Holy Corner

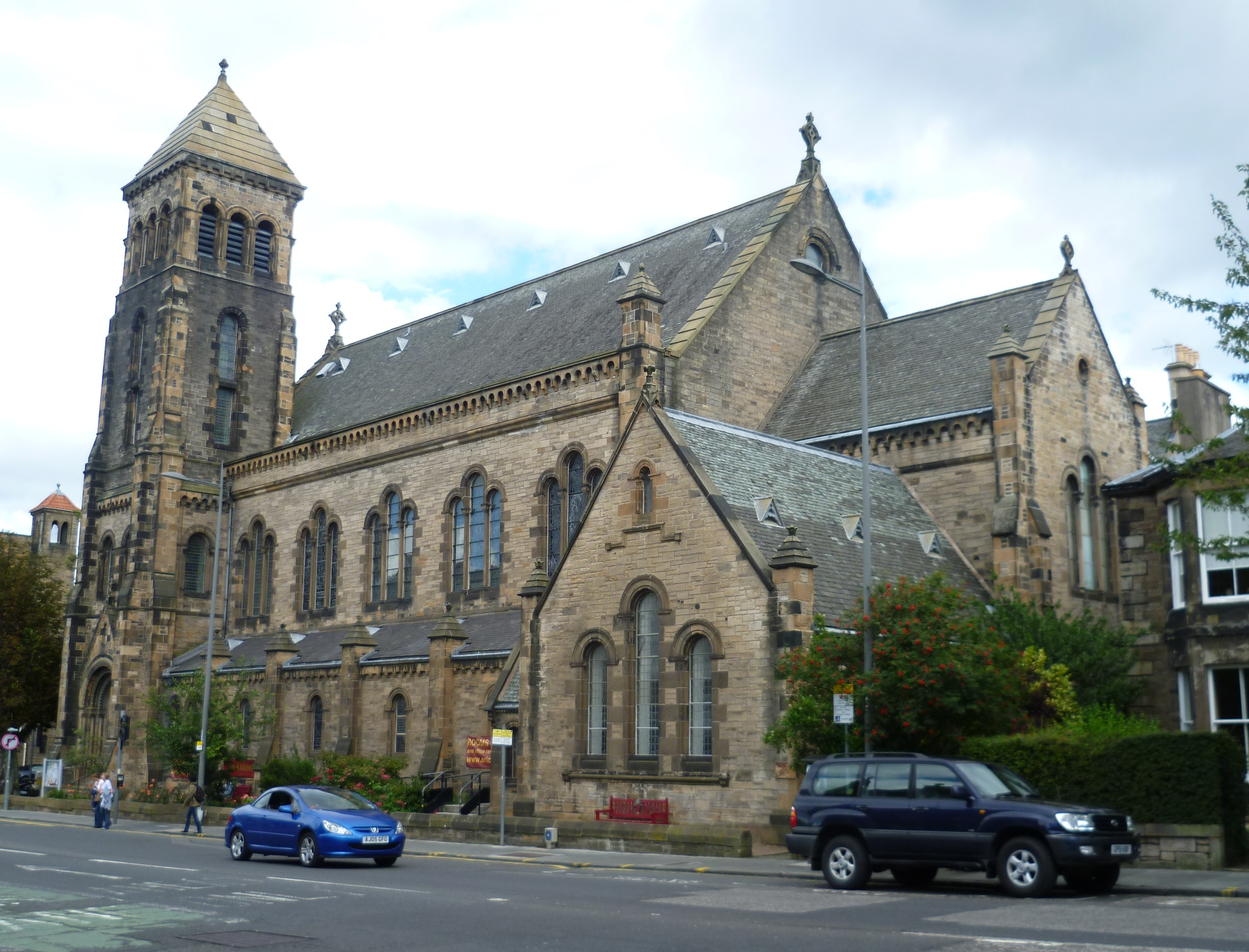
Eric Liddell Centre (former North Morningside Church), Holy Corner

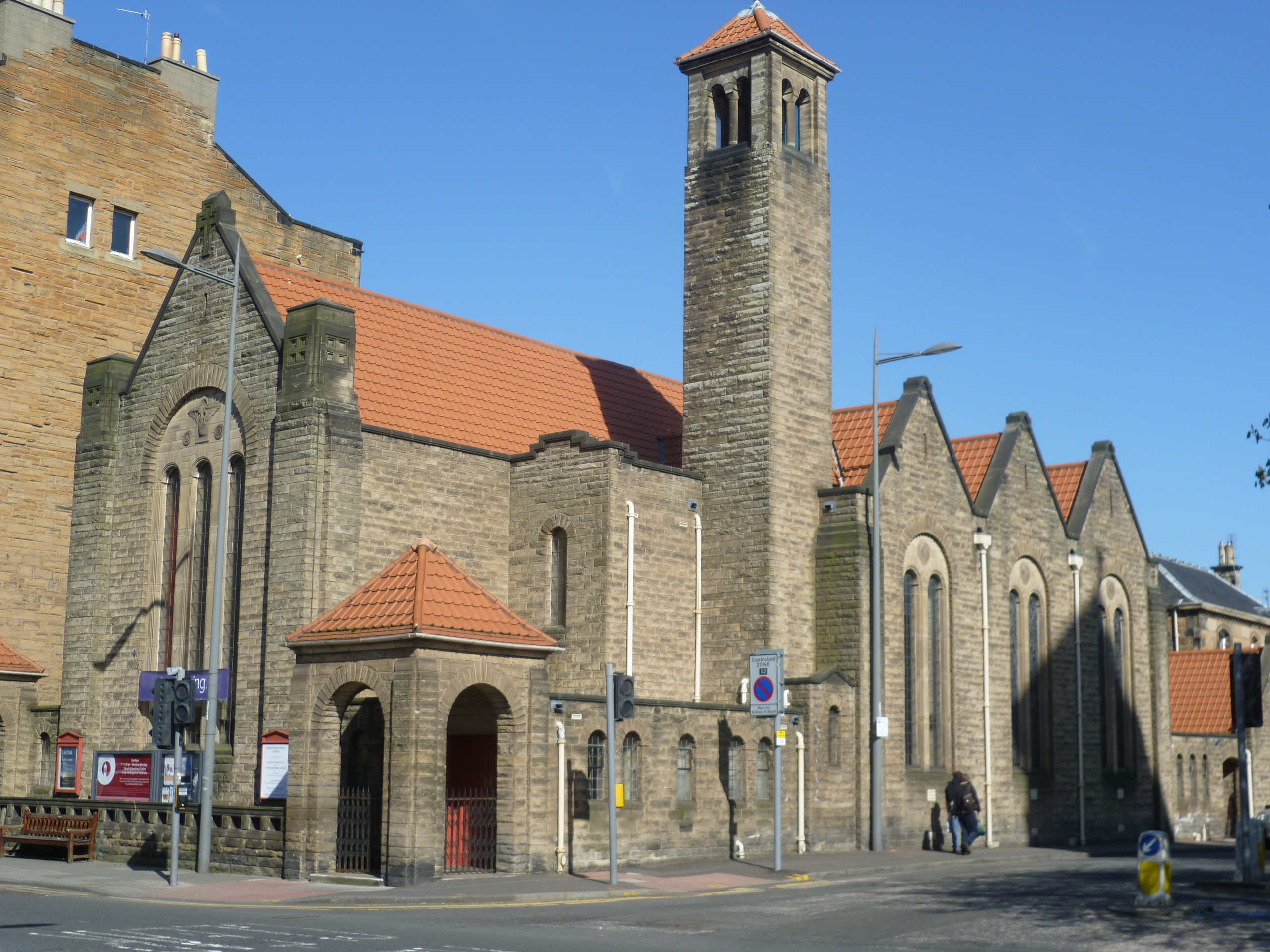
Morningside United Church, Holy Corner

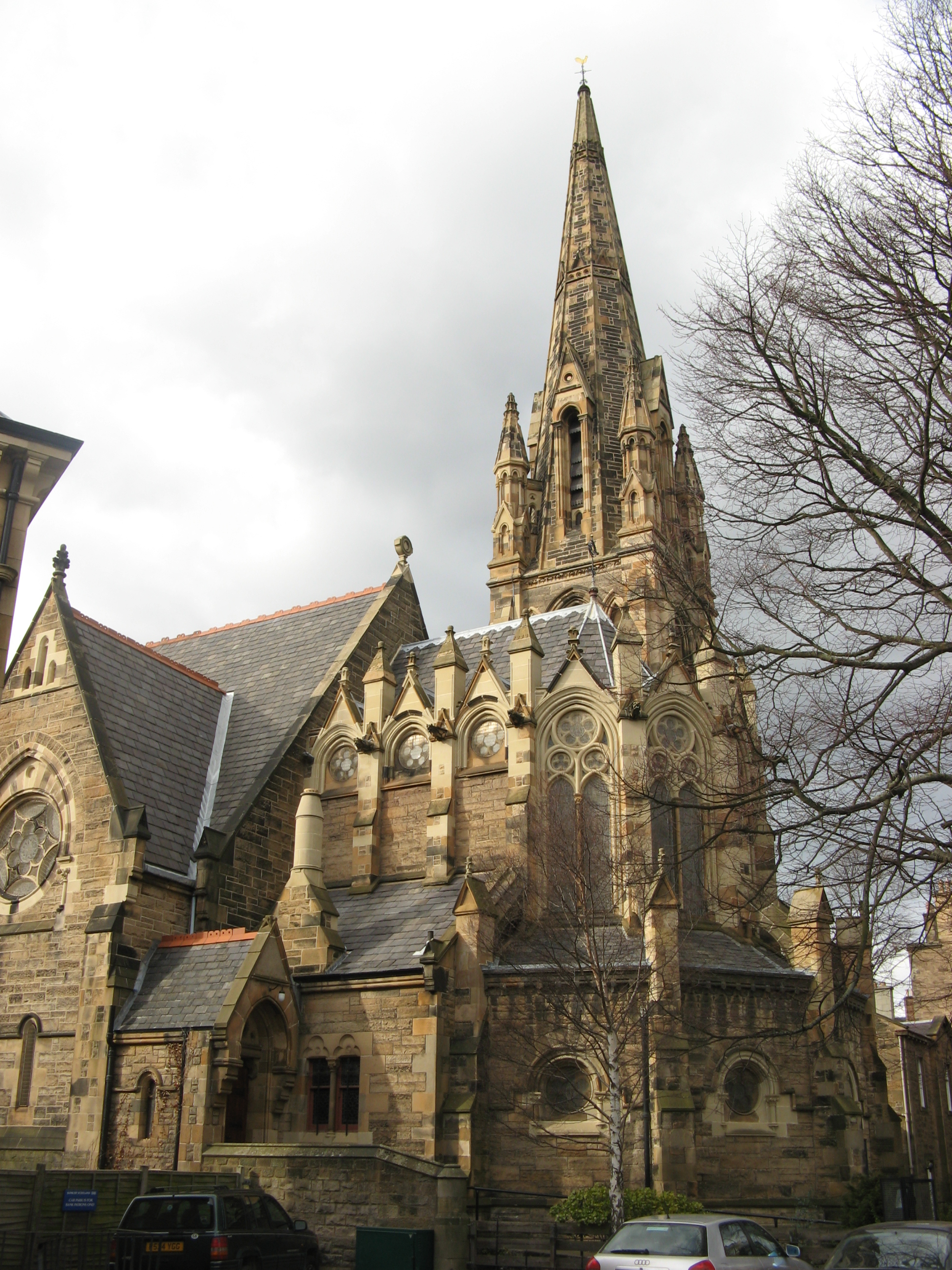
Christ Church Episcopal, Holy Corner
