= Maisie (given name) =

Maisie, also spelt Maisy or other minor variations, is a feminine given name of Scottish origin, derived from Mey (a pet form either of Mary or Margaret) and the diminutive suffix -sie.

== People ==
=== Maisie ===
- Maisie Adam (born 1994), English stand-up comedian, writer and actress
- Maisie Bond (born 2007), British diver
- Maisie Carr (1912–1988), Australian botanist
- Maisie Chan (born 1977), British children's writer
- Maisie Gay (1883–1945), English actress
- Maisie Maxwell (1876–1977), Australian film actress
- Maisie McDaniel (1939–2008), Irish singer
- Maisie Methuen (born 2001), English artistic gymnast
- Maisie Mosco (1924–2011), English writer
- Maisie Nankivell (born 1999), Australian rules football player
- Maisie Peters (born 2000), English musician
- Maisie Potter (born 1997), Welsh snowboarder
- Maisie Renault (1907–2003), French resistance fighter
- Maisie Richardson-Sellers (born 1992), English actress
- Maisie Ringham (1924–2016), British trombonist
- Maisie Shiell (1916–2008), Canadian anti-nuclear activist
- Maisie Smith (born 2001), English actress
- Maisie Summers-Newton (born 2002), British swimmer
- Maisie Symonds, English footballer
- Maisie Trollette (1933–2025), British drag queen
- Maisie Ward (1889–1975), British writer, publisher and speaker
- Maisie Williams (born 1997), British actress

=== Maisy ===
- Maisy Barker, English footballer
- Maisy Collis (born 2000), English footballer
- Maisy Gibson (born 1996), Australian cricketer
- Maisy Ma (born 1999), Hong Kong figure skater
- Maisy Stella (born 2003), Canadian singer and actress

=== Maysie ===
- Maysie Bestall-Cohen (born 1945), New Zealand modelling agent and fashion show producer
- Maysie Chalmers (1894–1982), British engineer, aviator and actress
- Maysie Coucher Greig (1901–1971), Australian writer of romantic novels
- Maysie Hoy (born 1949), Canadian actress and film editor
- Maysie Webb (1923–2005), British librarian and museum executive

=== Mazie ===
- Mazie E. Clemens (1890s–1952), American journalist and war correspondent
- Mazie Follette (fl 1901–1911), American dancer
- Mazie Gordon-Phillips (1896–1964), American movie theater owner
- Mazie Hirono (born 1947), American junior senator from Hawaii
- Mazie King (1888–1968), American toe dancer, vaudeville performer
- Mazie Turner (1954–2014), Australian artist
- Mazie O. Tyson (1900–1975), American geographer
- Mazie, pseudonym of Grace Christian, American pop star.

=== Maisey ===
- Maisey Rika (born 1982/1983), New Zealand singer, songwriter and composer

=== Maizie ===
- Maizie Williams (born 1951), British model and singer

== Fictional characters ==
=== Maisie ===
- Maisie, in the British comic strip The Perishers (1959–2006)
- Maisie, the character loved by the protagonist in Rudyard Kipling's first novel, The Light That Failed (1891)
- Maisie, protagonist in the Rosa Mulholland novel Our Sister Maisie (1907)
- Maisie Dobbs, protagonist in an ongoing series of detective novels by Jacqueline Winspear, from 2003
- Maisie Farange, the protagonist in the Henry James novel What Maisie Knew (1897)
  - Maisie, the same character in the 2012 film of the novel, played by Onata Aprile
- Maisie Lockwood, a supporting character in the Jurassic Park film franchise
- Maisie MacKenzie, the kitten in the 1980s Scottish children's books by Aileen Paterson
  - Maisie Mac, the same character in the 2000-2003 British animated TV series Meeow! (Gaelic version: Meusaidh)
- Maisie Raine, the title character of the eponymous 1998-1999 British TV drama series
- Maisie Ravier, character played by Ann Sothern in ten films and a radio show (1939–1953) and by Janis Paige in a 1960 telemovie
- Maisie Wylde, in the British TV soap opera Emmerdale

=== Other spellings ===
- Maisy Gibbons from Desperate Housewives
- Maisy Mouse, the titular character of the children's book series by Lucy Cousins and its animated adaptation
- Maizy Russell, a character in the 1989 film Uncle Buck

== See also ==
- Maisie (disambiguation)
