= 1934 in Scotland =

- Centuries: 18th; 19th; 20th; 21st
- Decades: 1910s; 1920s; 1930s; 1940s; 1950s
- See also: List of years in Scotland; Timeline of Scottish history 1934 in: The UK • Wales • Elsewhere; Scottish football: 1933–34 • 1934–35

Events from the year 1934 in Scotland.

== Incumbents ==
- Secretary of State for Scotland and Keeper of the Great Seal – Sir Godfrey Collins

=== Law officers ===
- Lord Advocate – Wilfrid Normand
- Solicitor General for Scotland – Douglas Jamieson

=== Judiciary ===
- Lord President of the Court of Session and Lord Justice General – Lord Clyde
- Lord Justice Clerk – Lord Aitchison
- Chairman of the Scottish Land Court – Lord St Vigeans, then Lord MacGregor Mitchell

== Events ==
- 14 & 16 January – Christina MacLennan gives birth to twins, the first on the island of Scarp in the county of Inverness-shire and the second in Stornoway in the county of Ross and Cromarty.
- 3 April – work on construction of "Hull 534", the ocean liner RMS Queen Mary, at John Brown & Company's shipyard at Clydebank resumes after more than 2 years' suspension due to the Great Depression following a financial agreement between the Cunard Line and the British government.
- 7 April – the Scottish National Party is formed by merger of the National Party of Scotland and the Scottish Party. On 20 April it holds its first public meeting, in Edinburgh.
- 21 April – the "surgeon's photograph" of the Loch Ness Monster, much later admitted to be a hoax, is published in the Daily Mail (London).
- 29 May – first regular domestic airmail service, inaugurated by Highland Airways between Inverness and Kirkwall.
- 28 & 31 July – Gerhard Zucker launches rocket mail experimentally between the Outer Hebridean islands of Scarp and Harris; in both attempts the powder rockets explode.
- 26 September – launching of the RMS Queen Mary at Clydebank.
- 25 December – dedication of the permanent St Columba's Cathedral at Oban, Mother Church of the Roman Catholic Diocese of Argyll and the Isles.
- Sandray becomes uninhabited.
- Gordonstoun school established in Moray.
- Original Barrowland Ballroom building is opened in Glasgow by "Barra Queen" Maggie McIver.
- Agnes Mure Mackenzie publishes the historical biography Robert Bruce, King of Scots.

== Births ==
- 12 January – I. Howard Marshall, theologian (died 2015)
- 2 February – Hugh McIlvanney, sports journalist (died 2019)
- 12 February – Annette Crosbie, actress
- 8 March – John McLeod, composer (died 2022)
- 11 March – John D. Burgess, bagpipe player (died 2005)
- 17 March – Pat Gerber, author mainly known for children's books (died 2006)
- 7 April – Ian Richardson, actor (died 2007)
- 17 April – Bill Douglas, film director, (died 1991 in Bishop's Tawton)
- 24 April – John Cameron, Lord Coulsfield, judge (died 2016)
- 5 May – Jim Reid, folk musician (died 2009)
- 10 May – Sir William Lithgow, 2nd Baronet, businessman (died 2022)
- 11 May – Mark Boyle, artist (died 2005)
- 28 August – John Stephen, menswear entrepreneur (died 2004 in England)
- 21 September – David J. Thouless, condensed-matter physicist, recipient of the Nobel Prize in Physics (died 2019 in Cambridge)
- 14 November – Dave Mackay, footballer and manager (died 2015 in England)
- 30 November – Aileen Paterson, writer and illustrator, best known for her series of children's books about Maisie MacKenzie the kitten (died 2018)
- 28 December – Alasdair Gray, novelist, artist, playwright, academic, teacher and poet (died 2019)
- Tom Alexander of The Alexander Brothers, folk singer (died 2020)
- Alasdair Grant Taylor, artist and sculptor (died 2007)

== Deaths ==
- 18 April – Catherine Cranston, tearoom proprietor (born 1849)
- 3 November – Sir Robert McAlpine, 1st Baronet, founder of the construction firm now called Sir Robert McAlpine (born 1847)
- 14 November – John Joy Bell, writer, creator of Wee Macgreegor (born 1871)
- 18 December – Peter Hodge, referee and football manager (born 1871)
- Esther Blaikie MacKinnon, artist, known for her paintings and engravings (born 1885)

== The arts ==
- September – English actor John Le Mesurier (under his birth name John Halliley) makes his professional stage debut, with the Millicent Ward Repertory Players at the Palladium Theatre, Edinburgh, in J. B. Priestley's Dangerous Corner.
- Helen Cruickshank's poems Up the Noran Water published.
- Hugh MacDiarmid's Stony Limits and Other Poems published.
- Nan Shepherd's poems In the Cairngorms published.

== See also ==
- 1934 in Northern Ireland
