= Connie Frazer =

Australian poet, feminist, revolutionist and writer

- Born: Constance Winifred Frazer; 18 September 1925; Coventry, Warwickshire, England
- Died: 6 May 2002 (aged 76); Adelaide, South Australia
- Citizenship: Australian
- Occupation: Poet

Constance Winifred Frazer (18 September 1925 – 6 May 2002) was an Australian poet, feminist, revolutionist and writer.

== Biography ==
She was born in Coventry, England in 1925 to a working-class family. She served as postal clerk in the women's section of the British Army during WW2. After marrying she lived in a cottage on the east coast of Scotland for a decade, before migrating to Whyalla, South Australia, in 1957 with her husband Bill. They later divorced.

== Activism ==
Frazer was active in the Women's Liberation Movement. She was also part of the key group that established the Women's Liberation Centre at Bloor Court, Adelaide; including a counselling service attached to the centre. As part of her work and activism, Frazer helped establish the first Women's Shelter in Adelaide and the Christies Beach Shelter at the southern suburb of Christies Beach. She was an active member of the Tuesday Afternoon Group, a collective of women interested in women's issues.

She became active in the Anti-War Movement during the Vietnam War, prompted by concern about her son being conscripted. She also founded Women Against Nuclear Energy (WANE) in 1980.

== Poetry ==
Frazer's early poetry consisted of short, humorous verses for her son. Shortly after her arrival in Australia in the 1950s, secret British nuclear tests were being conducted at Maralinga on a site measuring about 3,300 square kilometres (1,300 sq mi) in area. Out of concern about the atomic bomb tests being conducted in her home state, Frazer began to express her response in verse. Finding that she could produce serious poetry on the topic of nuclear war, she used writing as an outlet and release. The political poems she wrote at this time were different in content and tone to her prior poetry, which was born out of the time she spent at home as a housewife and focused on domestic themes.

Frazer was strongly affiliated with the Adelaide-based Friendly Street Poets, a poetry reading group and publisher based in Adelaide, South Australia. Australia's longest running open-mic poetry reading community, Friendly Street Poets was inaugurated as a fortnightly poetry reading on 11 November 1975, organised by Andrew Taylor, Richard Tipping and Ian Reid. Frazer's poems were published in 23 of the 26 readers of the Friendly Street Poet anthologies up until 2001, as well as in journals, newspapers, and magazines.

Frazer has read on ABC Radio and Radio Adelaide, as well as broadcasting poems on "Women Poets in Adelaide" in 1978. She participated in a poetry performance at the Unley Town Hall in 1987, organised by Tantrum Press and called The Company of Women. Two of her poems, 'Mirrors, and 'Death of a goddess' were performed at the Flinders University Drama Centre in 1996 in a piece called Mirrors: a performance anthology of SA women's poetry.

Frazer was a founding sponsor of and contributor to the Green Left Weekly alternative newspaper and she was an active member of the Democratic Socialist Party.

She published two poetry collections with Friendly Street Poets: Other Ways of Looking (1988) and Earthdweller, and co-edited Friendly Street Poetry reader no. 13 with Barry Westburg in 1989. There is also a spoken text published about Connie's life, entitled Ugly as a Boxer's Glove, which is spoken by Connie and edited by Marg McHugh.
