= Maisie =

Maisie may refer to:

- Maisie (given name), a list of people and fictional characters named Maisie or spelling variations thereof
- Maisie Ravier, an American film and radio show character
  - Maisie (1939 film), an American comedy film, the first in a series featuring Maisie Ravier
    - The Adventures of Maisie, a 1945 spin-off radio program based on the movie series
  - Maisie (telemovie), an unsold 1960 television pilot starring Janis Paige as Maisie Ravier
- Maisie (2021 film), a British documentary film
- "Maisie", a song by Syd Barrett from the 1970 album Barrett
- Maisie's Galaxy, a distant galaxy considered the oldest known

== See also ==
- Maisi (disambiguation)
- Maisy (book series), a series of children's books by Lucy Cousins
- Maisy (TV series), a British TV series based on the book series
- Mazie (disambiguation)
