= Maisi (disambiguation) =

Maisi is a British musician and social media personality.

Maisi may also refer to:

- Maisi fisheri, a species of beetle in the monotypic genus Maisi
- Maisí, a municipality and town in the Guantánamo Province of Cuba

== See also ==
- Maisie (disambiguation), also spelled Maisy
  - Maisy, a British animated TV series
- Mazie (disambiguation)
