= Jami Attenberg =

American fiction writer and essayist

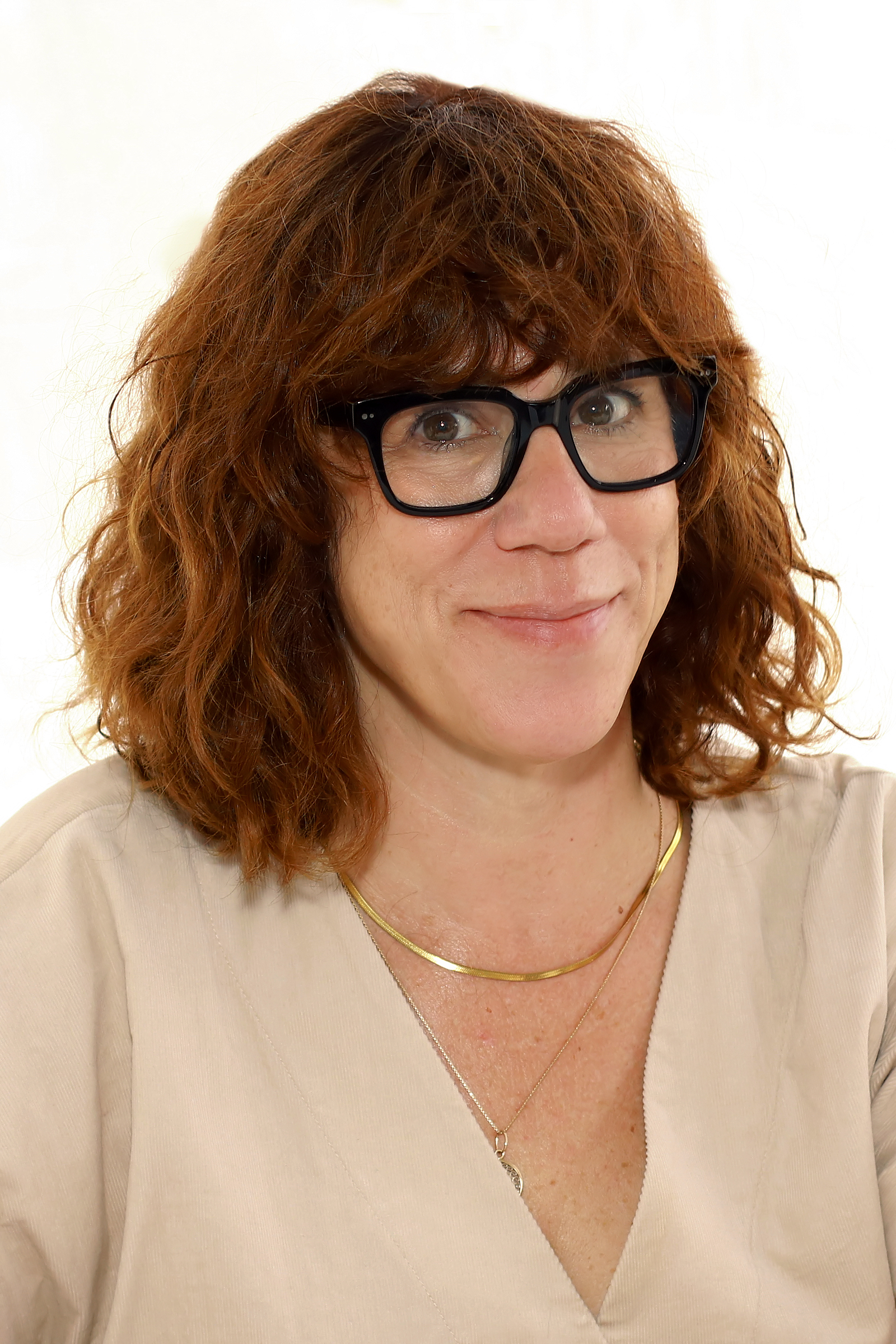
- Attenberg at the 2024 Texas Book Festival.
- Born: 1971 (age 54–55); Arlington Heights, Illinois, U.S.
- Education: Johns Hopkins University
- Occupation: Writer
- Era: 21st-century
- Notable work: The Middlesteins, Saint Mazie, All Grown Up, I Came All This Way to Meet You
- Website: jamiattenberg.com

Jami Attenberg (born 1971) is an American fiction writer and essayist. She is the author of a short story collection and seven novels, including the best-seller The Middlesteins (2012) and a memoir, I Came All This Way to Meet You (2022).

== Early life ==
Attenberg was born in 1971 in Arlington Heights, Illinois. The daughter of a travelling salesman, she grew up in Buffalo Grove, Illinois, and graduated from Johns Hopkins University in 1993.

== Career ==
Attenberg worked at HBO (2000 to 2003) before deciding to devote herself to fiction writing, initially supported by temp jobs. Attenberg has also worked at WORD bookstore in Greenpoint, Brooklyn, a job she took after giving several readings at the store.

In 2018 Attenberg began leading an accountability practice for writers called 1000 words. It is a newsletter and community wherein writers encourage each other to write 1000 words each day. In 2024 Attenberg published a compilation volume containing the thoughts and advice of 50 well-known writers responding to the 1000 words movement.

=== Fiction ===
In 2006, Attenberg published a collection of short stories with Random/Shaye Areheart under the title Instant Love. Two novels followed: The Kept Man (Riverhead, 2008) and The Melting Season (2010).

Following a change in publisher and accompanying marketing strategy (with subsequent works promoted not as women's fiction but instead as literary fiction, including a blurb from Jonathan Franzen on her third book), Attenberg experienced a literary breakthrough in 2012 with her third novel The Middlesteins, which became a New York Times bestseller and was listed among the ten best-selling books on Amazon in 2012. The book describes "a suburban Jewish family, and how it reacts to the disaster unfolding in its midst," Julie Orringer wrote in a New York Times review, with different chapters narrated from different characters' point of view. The Middlesteins was translated into multiple languages and Attenberg was nominated for multiple literature awards, including the Los Angeles Times Book Prize and the St. Francis College Literary Prize.

In 2015, Attenberg published her fifth book, Saint Mazie (Hachette). Saint Mazie is a historical novel based on Mazie Gordon-Phillips, who lived in New York in the Jazz Age; the novel is written as her fictional diary discovered by a documentary filmmaker researching her life. BuzzFeed listed Saint Mazie as one of the 27 "Most Exciting Books of 2015."

Attenberg's next novel, All Grown Up, was published by Houghton Mifflin Harcourt in the US in March 2017, and in the UK, France, Italy, Germany and Holland in 2017–2018. All Grown Up tells the story of 39-year-old Andrea Bern, who is single and living in New York as her family cares for her terminally ill niece in New Hampshire. In The New York Times, Helen Schulman notes that like The Middlesteins, All Grown Up "is in part about choosing to save yourself even if that means letting down someone who really needs you."

In October 2019, she published All This Could Be Yours. It was selected as a Publishers Weekly Pick with a starred review.

=== Nonfiction ===
Attenberg's essays have been published in The New York Times, The Wall Street Journal, Vogue, Elle and Lenny Letter. In January 2022, she published a memoir, I Came All This Way to Meet You; in a review in The New York Times, Claire Dederer said the book reflected Attenberg's "gifts as a novelist: a fierce impulse toward honesty, a companionably cranky voice and an interest in the complicated, bobbing and weaving ways in which people navigate their desires."

== Personal life ==
Attenberg lives in New Orleans, LA.

== Bibliography ==
=== Short-story collection ===
- Instant Love: Fiction. Shaye Areheart Books. 2006. ISBN 978-0-307-33782-5.

=== Novels ===
- The Kept Man. Riverhead Books. 2007. ISBN 978-1-101-21801-3.
- The Melting Season. Riverhead Books. 2010. ISBN 978-1-59448-896-2.
- The Middlesteins. Grand Central Publishing. 2012. ISBN 978-1-4555-0719-1.
- Saint Mazie. Grand Central Publishing. 2015. ISBN 978-1-4555-9988-2.
- All Grown Up. HarperCollins. 2017. ISBN 978-0-544-82426-3.
- All This Could Be Yours. Houghton Mifflin Harcourt. 2019. ISBN 978-0-544-82425-6.
- A Reason to See You Again. Ecco. 2024. ISBN 9780063039841.

=== Memoirs ===
- I Came All This Way to Meet You: Writing Myself Home. HarperCollins. 2022. ISBN 978-0-06-303981-0.

=== Nonfiction ===
- 1000 Words: A Writer's Guide to Staying Creative, Focused, and Productive All Year Round. Simon and Schuster. 2024. ISBN 9781668023600.
