= Mazie =

Mazie may refer to:

== People ==
- Bob Mazie (1938–2017), American college football coach
- Mazie (given name), a variant of Maisie
- Mazie (pop singer)

== Places ==
- Mazie, Kentucky, an unincorporated community
- Mazie, Oklahoma, a census-designated place

== Other uses ==
- "Mazie", a cat, the first live mascot of the New Hampshire Wildcats, between 1927 and 1929

== See also ==
- Maisi (disambiguation)
- Maisie (disambiguation)
  - Maisie (given name)
