= Andrew Taylor (poet) =

Australian poet and academic (born 1940)

- Born: Andrew McDonald Taylor; 1940 (age 85–86); Warrnambool, Victoria, Australia
- Occupations: Poet and academic
- Writing career
- Language: English
- Years active: 1959-
- Notable work: Travelling
- Notable awards: 1986 Commonwealth Poetry Prize — Australia and Pacific Area

Andrew McDonald Taylor AM (born 19 March 1940) is an Australian poet and academic, and a co-founder of Friendly Street Poets in Adelaide, South Australia.

== Early life and career ==
Andrew Taylor was born in Warrnambool, Victoria on 19 March 1940. Educated at the University of Melbourne, Taylor moved to Adelaide in 1970, where he taught at the English Department at the University of Adelaide, mainly in American Literature.

== Academic career ==
In 1992 he became the Foundation Professor of English at Edith Cowan University in Perth, Western Australia.

Taylor taught for many years at the University of Adelaide, and was made an emeritus professor at Edith Cowan University. He has been a visiting lecturer at Cornell University in the US and Churchill College Cambridge, UK, and has also taught at the University of Tübingen in Germany and at the University of Shanghai for Science and Technology in China.

== Poetry and other roles ==
In 1975 Taylor co-founded the poetry reading group Friendly Street Poets in Adelaide, along with Richard Tipping and Ian Reid.

He was a co-founder and the first chair of the South Australian Writers' Centre, which was the first and prototype of many subsequent writers' centres throughout Australia, established in 1985.

In 2005, Salt Publishing published Andrew Taylor's Collected Poems, bringing together his entire body of poetry, including new poems written between 2000 and 2003. A further collection, The Unhaunting was published in 2009. Although the bulk of Taylor's poems are relatively short lyrics or meditations, he has also been drawn to longer forms. The Crystal Absences, the Trout and Rome are each single book-length poems, and Parabolas is a collection of prose poems that broke new ground in Australia when first published. His critical study, Reading Australian Poetry was the first of its kind in Australia in many years.

From 2006 until 2009 he was the poetry editor for the Australian literary journal Westerly. He has been a member of the South Australian Arts Grants Advisory Committee, the Australian Society of Authors Management Committee and acting chairperson of the Literature Board of the Australia Council.

== Accolades ==
Taylor was the regional winner of the British Airways Commonwealth Poetry Prize for his 1986 book, Travelling. His 1995 book of poetry, Sandstone, won the Western Australian Premier's Book Awards for poetry for that year, and Götterdämmerung Café was shortlisted in 2002.

In 1990 he was made a Member of the Order of Australia (AM) for "service to the Arts, particularly in the field of literature".

== Selected works ==
- The Cool Change (1971)
- Ice Fishing (1973)
- The Invention of Fire (1976)
- The Cat's Chin and Ears (1976)
- Parabolas: Prose Poems (1976)
- The Crystal Absences, the Trout (1976)
- Number Two Friendly Street (co-editor with Ian Reid) (1978)
- Selected Poems (1960-1980) (1982)
- Travelling (1986)
- Reading Australian Poetry (1987) (criticism)
- Folds in the Map (1991)
- Sandstone (1995)
- Götterdämmerung Café (2001)
- Collected Poems (2004)
- Rome (2005)
- Regret about the Wolves and other poems (2006)
- The Unhaunting (2009)
- Impossibles Preludes (2016)
- Coogee Poems Plus (2021)
- Shore Lines (2023)
