= Meeow! =

Scottish children's television series

- Meeow! Titles with Maisie Mac
- Meusaidh
- Genre: Children's Television
- Written by: Roland Moore, Les Brooksbank
- Directed by: Les Orton
- Narrated by: Stanley Baxter (English); Tony Kearney (Gaelic)
- Composer: The Singing Kettle
- Country of origin: United Kingdom
- Original languages: English; Gaelic
- No. of seasons: 2
- No. of episodes: 26

Production
- Producer: Robin Lyons
- Running time: 10 min
- Production companies: Siriol Animation; SKD Media plc Scottish TV

Original release
- Network: ITV (CITV)
- Release: 5 January – 1 October 2000

Related
- Maisie MacKenzie

Meeow! (Gaelic version: Meusaidh) is a 2000 Scottish animated children's series based on the Maisie MacKenzie books by Aileen Paterson, and produced simultaneously in English and Gaelic versions. The series is about a young cat named MaisieMac who lives with her grandmother in Morningside in Edinburgh as her explorer father is always away.

Scottish TV in association with The Gaelic Committee, decided to adapt the book into a cartoon series, with Siriol Animation handling the animation. The stories were narrated by Scottish comedian Stanley Baxter (English version) and by actor Tony Kearney (Gaelic), and the theme music (both versions) was produced by The Singing Kettle. Its first run was featured on ITV's children's block, CITV.

The programme was re-aired in 2009 on wknd@stv - a children's television strand on Scottish television channel, STV. The Gaelic version used to air on BBC Alba. From March 2015 – 2017, the series aired as part of the "Weans' World" block on STV Glasgow and STV Edinburgh.

The rights of the show was owned by The Sleepy Kids Company Ltd (who also produced Potsworth & Co. and Budgie the Little Helicopter) which was later rebranded as SKD Media and Entertainment Rights, then dissolved into Classic Media (now DreamWorks Classics, in turn owned by DreamWorks Animation, a subsidiary of NBCUniversal) and later became the property of Universal Television in 2016.

== Characters ==
- Maisie "MaisieMac" MacKenzie – A young Scottish cat who wishes to be an explorer like her father.
- Granny/Isabella MacKenzie – Maisie's grandmother/mum, who looks after Maisie whilst her father is away.
- Mrs. Marjorie McKitty – Maisie and Granny's neighbour.
- Archie – Maisie's best friend.
- Lydia McSporran - Mrs McKitty's niece.
- Daddy – Maisie's father who travels the world as part of his job as a professor at the University of Edinburgh.
- Maureen and Doreen Purrdy – Maisie's twin friends from her ballet class.
- Tommy and Morag McTwirl – Two snooty senior dancers from Maisie's ballet class.

== Episodes ==
No.	Title (Gaelic version)	Title (English version)	Summary (Gaelic)	Summary (English)	Original airdate
1	'S an Ath Rud a Rinn Ì	What MaisieMac Did Next	Tha a' Bh-ph McKitty a' toirt Mheusaidh agus Archie dhan taigh-tasgaidh. Fhad 's a tha i am falach, tha Mheusaidh air a glasadh gun fhiosta san taigh-tasgaidh air an oidhche.		5 January 2000; 26 years ago
2	Meusaidh ann am Paris	MaisieMac Loves Paris	Tha latha cruaidh aig Mheusaidh ann am Paris, ach tha luchag leis an ainm Alphonse ga cuideachadh.		12 January 2000
3	Meusaidh anns an Ospidal	MaisieMac Goes to Hospital			19 January 2000
4	Meusaidh agus Stòras na Spuinneadairean	MaisieMac and the Pirate Treasure			26 January 2000
5	Meusaidh Mo Bheannachd Ort	MaisieMac Saves the Day	Tha geama mòr ball-coise aig Mheusaidh air an aon latha ri banais a co-ogha. Às dèidh dhi a' chèic a shàbhaladh bho bhith a' dol gu milleadh, tha Mheusaidh comasach air a bhith an làthair aig a' gheama aig Wembley.		2 February 2000
6	Meusaidh anns a' Choille Uisge	MaisieMac in the Rainforest			9 February 2000
7	A' Falbh dhan Sgoil	MaisieMac Goes to School			16 February 2000
8	Meusaidh ann an Hollywood	MaisieMac Goes to Hollywood	Tha Mheusaidh air cuireadh a thoirt a Hollywood le a piuthar Betty agus a h-uncail Al. Tha i air fhastadh leis an stiùiriche film Rufus D. Walner gus a bhith na cleasaiche dùbailte ann am film Honey Pot Hot Shot.		23 February 2000
9	Meusaidh aig Loch Nis	MaisieMac and the Loch Ness Monster	Tha Mheusaidh a' dol air saor-làithean dhan Ghàidhealtachd, an dòchas Uilebheist Loch Nis fhaicinn, fhad 's a tha triùir chait trioblaideach a' cur dragh oirre.		1 March 2000
10	Meusaidh agus an Goirilea	MaisieMac and the Gorilla	Tha Mheusaidh agus a caraidean a' ruith às dèidh na tha iad a' smaoineachadh a tha na gorilla beò air saor.		8 March 2000
11	Meusaidh aig an Fhèis	MaisieMac's Festival Adventure	Bidh Mheusaidh a' tadhal air fèis còmhla ri a caraidean Mountie à Canada nuair a ghoid mèirleach poca-làimhe. Le cuideachadh bho Tommy am fear-bainne agus an t-each aige, bidh Mheusaidh a' glacadh a' mhèirlich.		15 March 2000
12	Meusaidh anns an Eiphit	MaisieMac in Egypt	Tha Mheusaidh a' tuiteam air inntrigeadh dìomhair gu pioramaid àrsaidh Èiphiteach, a bhios a h-athair a' cladhach nas fhaide air adhart.		26 March 2000
13	Meusaidh agus am Bàta Smùide	MaisieMac and the Puffer			2 April 2000
14	Nollaig Chrìdheal a Mheusaidh	Merry Christmas MasieMac	Tha Dadaidh glaiste ann an Sìona agus chan urrainn dha a dhol còmhla ri Mheusaidh airson na Nollaige, gus an tèid mìorbhail a thoirt dha.		9 April 2000
15	Meusaidh ann am Moscow	MaisieMac in Moscow	Thèid Mheusaidh agus na Purrdy Twins a Mhosgo a dhannsadh ann am ballet còmhla ri Tommy is Morag McTwirl, fo stiùireadh an Sergei Jumpov teann.		16 April 2000
16	Meusaidh air Saor-Laithean Iongantach	MaisieMac's Mountain Rescue			23 April 2000
17	Meusaidh air Chall ann an Glaschu	MaisieMac Lost in Glasgow			30 April 2000
18	Meusaidh agus am Mèirleach	Cat Burglar			7 May 2000
19	Meusaidh aig Beinn Nibheis	Holiday Surprises			14 May 2000
20	Meusaidh ann an Iapan	MaisieMac in Japan	Tha Maisy a' dol a dh’Iapan a choimhead air a caraid-peann Noriko agus a' cuideachadh a bràthar Kobana, gleacaiche sumo, le bhith a' faighinn cuideam airson an fharpais a tha ri thighinn.		21 May 2000
21	Meusaidh ann an New York	MaisieMac in the Big Apple			28 May 2000
22	Meusaidh ann an Astralia	MaisieMac in Australia	Bidh Mheusaidh agus a h-athair a' dol air turas dàna tarsainn preasan Astràilia fo stiùireadh cangarù air a bheil Skipper.		4 June 2000
23	Meusaidh aig na Geamaichean Gàidhlealach	MaisieMac at the Highland Games			11 June 2000
24	Meusaidh anns na Brownies	MaisieMac Joins the Brownies			18 June 2000
25	Meusaidh agus am Fògarrach	MaisieMac and the Owl Hoot			25 June 2000
26	Meusaidh is na h-Ionnsramaidean Ciùil	MaisieMac Hits the Right Note	Bidh oidhirpean Mheusaidh air diofar ionnsramaidean ciùil a chluich a' crìochnachadh ann an cacophony. Is e triantan an ionnsramaid a tha dìreach dhi.		1 October 2000; 25 years ago
