= Jenny Boult =

Australian poet (1951–2005)

Jenny Boult (8 October 1951 – 1 November 2005), also known as MML Bliss, was an Australian poet, playwright, and editor.

== Early life and education ==
Jennifer Boult was born in Warwickshire, England, in 1951, migrating to Western Australia with her family in 1967. Her birth family consisted of mother Florence Mary (Molly) Boult (maiden name Elliot), father Leslie Dean Boult, younger brother Jeremy Dean Boult Jr and younger sister Christine Anne Boult.

Boult attended Applecross Senior High School in Perth, matriculating in 1968, and won a Commonwealth Scholarship to the University of Western Australia.

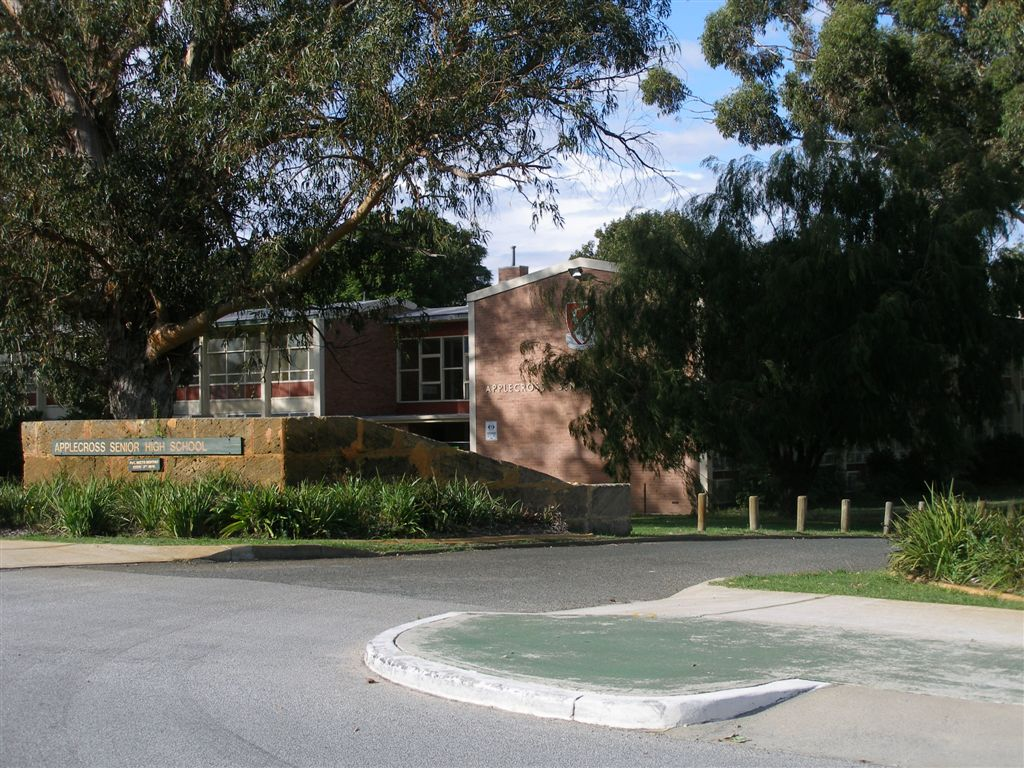
Boult attended Applecross Senior High School

== Career ==
Boult lived for a time in Sydney and Melbourne before returning to Perth with her infant son, then moved to Adelaide with Harry Bardwell and her son Daniel in 1977. She was instrumental in setting up the Friendly Street Poets in Adelaide at the Box Factory in 1975, and lived in McLaren St for many years before moving to Norwood. She was both South Australia and National Secretary of the Poets Union until 1983.

She was a member of the Women's Art Movement in Adelaide.

In 1986 she was Writer in Residence at the Adelaide Festival Centre and was awarded a Senior Writer's Fellowship by the Literature Board of the Australia Council for the Arts.

In 1994 she moved to the small, historic tin mining town of Derby, Tasmania, with her long-time friend and partner Tim Smith.

In 1999 Boult changed her name to Magenta Maria Loveday Bliss and wrote as MML Bliss. MML Bliss lived for many years in Launceston and was President of the Tasmanian Poetry Festival.

== Recognition ==
- Boult was joint winner of the 1981 Anne Elder Award for "the hotel anonymous", her first collection of poetry.
- In 2002 she was awarded a Booranga Writers Fellowship at Charles Sturt University in Wagga Wagga, New South Wales.
- She was a book reviewer for Thylazine and Sidewalk magazines and awarded a Hydro Tasmania Fellowship for 2003.
- Poems, stories and plays by Jenny Boult and MML Bliss have appeared in magazines, journals and anthologies in Australia and overseas. Her works have been translated into French, Swedish, Norwegian, Urdu, German and Italian.

== Later life and death ==
She died in Launceston in 2005 after a long battle with throat cancer.

== Publications ==
Works as Jenny Boult

- The Hotel Anonymous poems (Bent Enterprises, 1981)
- Handbaggery poems (Bent Enterprises, 1982)
- Can't Help Dreaming playscript (All Out Ensemble, 1982)
- flight 39 poems (Abalone Press, 1984)
- "i" is a versatile character short stories (Words and Visions, 1984)
- the white rose and the bath (1986)
- About Auntie Rose poems (Omnibus / Puffin, 1988)
- abrasion in Hot Collation poems (Penguin, 1993)
- here poems (The Teller's House, 1999)
- poems (Friendly Street Poets)

Works as MML Bliss

- moonshine poems (PressPress 2002)
- Legend! poems (Cornford Press 2002) - a book of poetry for children of all ages.
- RAVO poems (Cornford Press 2003)
- unspoken poems (SideWalk Collective 2003)
