= Louise Crisp =

Australian poet (born 1957)

Louise Crisp (born 1957) is an Australian poet, deckhand, and fire tower watcher.

== Early life and education ==
Crisp was born in 1957, in Omeo. He studied linguistics, anthropology, and prehistory at the Australian National University.

== Career ==
Crisp has worked in various jobs, including as a fire tower person on Mount Nugong, as deckhand on fishing boats in both the Northern Territory and Western Australia, and as a spokesperson for Forest Fire Management Victoria.

=== Poetry ===
Crisp's first collection was The luminous ocean, a shared volume with Valery Wilde's In the Half-Light, published by Friendly Street Poets in 1988. She has published several more books of poetry including written in pearl & sea fed (published by Hazard Press, New Zealand in 1994) which she wrote while working on the fire tower. This volume was shortlisted for the 1995 C. J. Dennis Prize for Poetry and the New South Wales Premier's Award.

Crisp's 2019 book, Yuiquimbiang, was described as "another wonderful addition to our literature's re-engagement with the mosaic-continent nowadays known as Australia" and shortlisted for the 2020 Victorian Premier's Prize for Poetry.

== Personal life ==
Crisp lives in East Gippsland with her partner and two daughters. She is a canoeist.

== Works ==
- —— (1988). The Luminous Ocean. Friendly Street Poets.
- —— (1994). pearl & sea fed. Hazard Press. ISBN 9780908790791.
- —— (1998). Ruby Camp: A Snowy River Series. Spinifex Press. ISBN 9781875559831.
- —— (2004). Three Golden Fish. Wind and Water Press. ISBN 9780958542289.
- —— (2007). Uplands: Poems. Five Islands Press. ISBN 9780734036926.
- —— (2019). Yuiquimbiang. Cordite Books. ISBN 9780648056898.
