= Friendly Street Poets =

Poetry reading group and publisher in Adelaide, South Australia

Friendly Street Poets, often referred to as just Friendly Street, is a poetry reading group and publisher in Adelaide, South Australia, established in 1975.

== History ==
Friendly Street Poets was inaugurated as a fortnightly poetry reading on 11 November 1975, organised by Andrew Taylor, Richard Tipping and Ian Reid. The first meeting took place on the roof of the former Gordon Sim Choon fireworks factory, on Union Street (off Rundle Street) in the East End of Adelaide. Then Chief Justice of South Australia, John Bray, himself a poet, was present. Jenny Boult was also instrumental in setting up the group.

It soon became a monthly event, and after about a year of meeting at the Media Resource Centre (then at 1 Union Street), the group moved to the Federal Box Factory. In 1977 a selection of the best poets from that year's readings was published as the Friendly Street Reader, and a similar volume has been produced annually since then.

== Events ==
The society holds regular events where anybody can read their own work. Friendly Street Poets value the acceptation and celebration of all works presented.

The readings took place at the Box Factory in central Adelaide from 1977 to 2003, when funding was cut. They moved back in 2017.

== Affiliated poets ==
Connie Frazer (1925–2002), poet, writer, activist and feminist, was involved with Friendly Street since its inception until her death, and was published in many of Friendly Street Poet anthologies, as well as having two of her collections published by them.

Among the more well known poets to have connections to the group are Graham Rowlands, Peter Goldsworthy, Jeff Guess, John Bray, Jenny Boult, Louise Crisp, Mike Ladd, and Jan Owen.

M.L. Emmett, a British poet also worked on the Friendly Street Poets Board as Publications Officer and in other leadership roles for four years.

== Publications ==
The Friendly Street Poetry Reader (aka The Reader, with some variant titles and sometimes subtitled) has been published annually since 1977, with the first issue compiled by Tipping and including a selection of poems at Friendly Streets meetings since 1975. There is an index of the Readers published between 1975 and 2007, available at the State Library of South Australia, created by past poet at Friendly Streets (a former librarian), Betty Collins. The anthologies have been launched at Adelaide Writers' Week for many years.

In the 1980s Friendly Street began publishing collections by individual poets, including the first collections of Mike Ladd, Jeri Kroll, Kate Llewellyn, Steve Evans, Jude Aquilina and Rory Harris.

Since 1995 the New Poets series of anthologies have been published, with each one containing the first collections of three poets.

Many of the publications have been in conjunction with Wakefield Press and Writers' Week, with the Readers launched at Writers' Week.

Best of Friends: The First Thirty Years of the Friendly Street Poets (2008) is divided more or less into two-halves; the first section outlines includes a history of the society, and the second is a selection of poems from the anthologies published in the first 30 years.

== See also ==
- Writers SA
