= Edinburgh Wild West =

Lane in Edinburgh, Scotland

Coordinates: 55.9289°N 3.2104°W

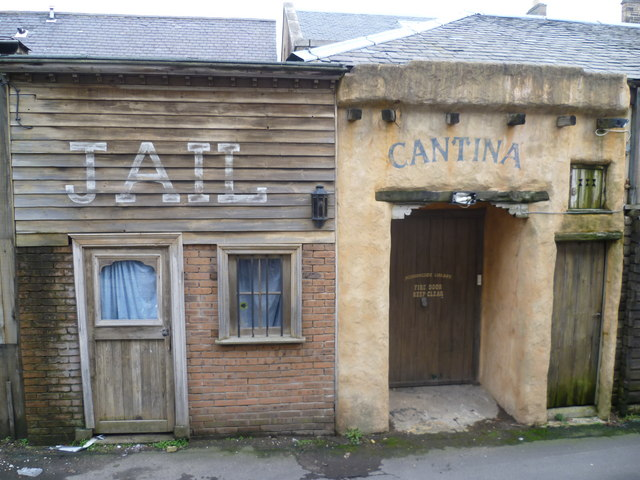

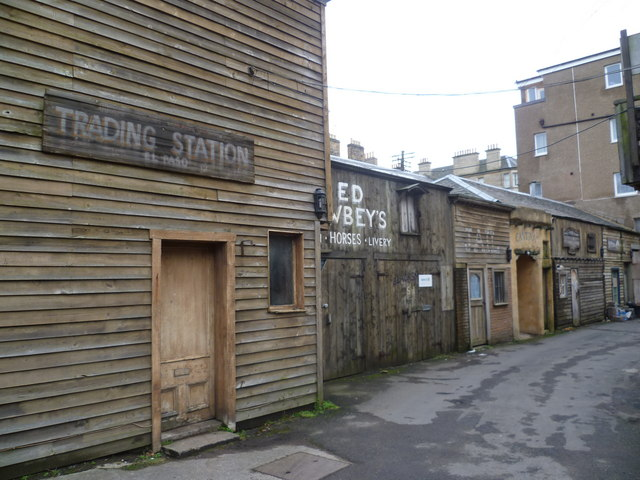

The Edinburgh Wild West (also known as El Paso) is a lane in Morningside, Edinburgh, in Scotland that was decorated with American West–style façades as an advertisement for a local furniture company. Although it has since fallen into disrepair, it has become an informal tourist attraction.

== History ==
The façades were the idea of Michael Faulkner, the son of Brian Faulkner who became Baron Faulkner of Downpatrick after serving as the last Prime Minister of Northern Ireland. Michael Faulkner had worked as a cowboy in North America before injuring his back in a fall from a horse. He moved to Edinburgh and established Pine Country, a furniture store in the lane off Springvalley Gardens in Morningside, accessible by a passage through a tenement block.

Faulkner expanded into a second store on the site, The Great American Indoors, selling Santa Fe–style furniture. In the early 1990s he decided to erect Western-style façades on the lane as a promotional tool for the store and to remind him of his time in North America. The works were constructed by two engineers who had worked on similar structures at Disneyland Paris. The store closed and Faulkner went bankrupt following the opening of an Ikea store in Edinburgh in 1999. The lane now houses garages and workshops. The façades have since fallen into disrepair but have become an unofficial tourist attraction, with an entry on Tripadvisor.

== Description ==
The site features façades of a jail, general store, ticket office, blacksmiths and cantina. There was originally also a railway station. The site also features a mural on a Native American theme. The structures that the façades cover are used as art studios, galleries and apartments. The cantina conceals the fire exit of the Morningside Library.
