= Maisi fisheri =

Scientific classification
- Domain: Eukaryota
- Kingdom: Animalia
- Phylum: Arthropoda
- Class: Insecta
- Order: Coleoptera
- Suborder: Polyphaga
- Infraorder: Cucujiformia
- Family: Cerambycidae
- Genus: Maisi; Zayas, 1975
- Species: M. fisheri

Binomial name
- Maisi fisheri Zayas, 1975

Species of beetle

Maisi fisheri is a species of beetle in the family Cerambycidae, and the only species in the genus Maisi. It was described by Zayas in 1975.
