= Pat Gerber =

Scottish writer

Pat Gerber (17 March 1934 in Glasgow – 26 August 2006 in Glasgow) was a Scottish writer and author mainly known for her children's books.

She wrote several children books, including: Volume of Clowns: Children's Poems on the Circus (1990), The Ghost of Glenmellish (2001), Stranger on the River (2002), and To Catch a Thief (2003).

She also wrote a fiction book, Adventures on Cairngorm (2002) and two adult books: Maiden Voyage: Explorations (1992) and The Search for the Stone of Destiny (Canongate, 1992). The latter was published again in paperback as Stone of Destiny in 1997. She also contributed an article on the role of Kay Matheson in the taking of the Stone of Destiny from Westminster Abbey by Scottish nationalist students in 1953 to the literary magazine Chapman (1994).

She was the writer of a travel guide to Scotland, called Outdoors Scotland (2000), as well.
