= Maisy (book series) =

British children's book series

- Author: Lucy Cousins
- Illustrator: Lucy Cousins
- Language: English
- Genre: Children's literature; Picture books
- Publisher: Walker Books (UK, AU, NZ); Candlewick (US)
- Published: 1990–present
- No. of books: 110

Maisy is a British children's book series created by British author Lucy Cousins. Walker Books began publishing the series in the UK in 1990. In the US, the books are published by Candlewick Press.

The series focuses on the everyday experiences of Maisy Mouse and her friends. The books are characterised by their bold graphic illustrations paired with simple, structured storylines.

More than 28 million copies of Maisy books have been sold globally, in 29 different languages. Titles within the series are published in many different formats, including board books, picture books, concept books, interactive books, activity books, and pop-up books.

== Creation ==
Lucy Cousins developed the idea for a children's lift-the-flap book during her final year at the Royal College of Art. The story she wrote was about a four to five-year-old girl getting ready to go for a swim. She illustrated the concept in her signature style, bold black outlines and bright blocks of colour. The titular character, Sally, had knitted and hand-sewn clothes. Upon presenting her mockup to the publishing company Walker Books, editor Wendy Boase suggested the book would be more 'fun' with an animal character. Sally was spontaneously replaced by Maisy Mouse, while the rest of the book remained the same and was published under the title Maisy Goes Swimming in 1990.

Cousin draws on a variety of everyday experiences for toddlers, incorporating the playfulness of the childhood imagination. She gathers inspiration for the books from observing her children and grandchildren.

== Characters ==
- Maisy (also known as Maisy Mouse) a white mouse with pink ears, whiskers, and tail. She loves to paint and play with her friends.
- Cyril a brown squirrel who is Maisy's best friend.
- Tallulah a yellow chick. She wears a dress and a bow.
- Charley a green crocodile who is very enthusiastic, especially when it comes to food.
- Eddie a large elephant who is a gentle giant. It can be difficult for him to join in games due to his size.

== Books ==
The series features over 100 titles, in different formats including board books, picture books, concept books, interactive books, activity books, and pop-up books.

List of Maisy titles by publication year (Walker edition, unless noted)
#	Title	Book Type	Year	ISBN
1	Maisy Goes Swimming	Board book	1990	9780744504286
2	Maisy Goes to Bed	Board book	1990	9780744504293
3	Maisy Goes to Playschool	Board book	1992	9780744525069
4	Maisy Goes to the Playground	Board book	1992	9780744525076
5	Maisy's ABC	Concept book (alphabet)	1994	9781564024190
6	Maisy's House: A Pop-up and Play Book	Pop-up book	1995	9780744544121
7	Count with Maisy	Concept book (numbers)	1997	9780744552218
8	Happy Birthday, Maisy	Interactive book (lift-the-flap)	1998	9780744561142
9	Maisy at the Farm: Lift the Flap Pull the Tab	Interactive book (lift-the-flap, tabbed)	1998	9780744561135
10	Dress Maisy Sticker Book (Note: Published as Dress Maisy: A Sticker Book in the US)	Activity book	1999	9780744569216
11	Maisy and Her Friends Colouring Book	Activity book	1999	9780744569247
12	Maisy Dresses Up	Board book	1999	9780744567656
13	Maisy Makes Gingerbread	Board book	1999	9780744572186
14	Maisy's Bedtime	Board book	1999	9780744567649
15	Maisy's Busy Book	Activity book	1999	9780744572384
16	Maisy's Pool	Board book	1999	9780744567663
17	Where Is Maisy?: A Lift-the-Flap Book	Interactive book (lift-the-flap)	1999	9780744569193
18	Where is Maisy's Panda?	Interactive book (lift-the-flap)	1999	9780744569209
19	Happy Christmas, Maisy	Interactive book (lift-the-flap)	2000	9780744575736
20	Maisy Drives the Bus	Board book	2000	9780763610852 (Candlewick Press)
21	Maisy Takes a Bath	Board book	2000	9780613279628
22	Maisy's Bus	Shaped board book	2000	9780744572780
23	Where are Maisy's Friends?: A Lift-the-Flap Book	Interactive book (lift-the-flap)	2000	9780744575323
24	Where Does Maisy Live?	Interactive book (lift-the-flap)	2000	9780744575330
25	Doctor Maisy	Board book	2001	9780744589023
26	Maisy at the Fair	Board book	2001	9780744572797
27	Maisy Goes Shopping	Board book	2001	9780744582826
28	Maisy Likes Driving	Soft book	2001	9780744581348
29	Maisy Likes Playing	Soft book	2001	9780744581331
30	Maisy's Big Flap Book	Interactive book (lift-the-flap)	2001	9780763611897 (Candlewick Press)
31	Maisy's Farm (Note: Published as Maisy's Farm: A Pop-Up and Play Set in the US)	Pop-up book	2001	9780744575873
32	Maisy's Favourite Clothes (Note: Published as Maisy's Favorite Clothes in the US)	Board book	2001	9780744544084
33	Maisy's Favourite Toys (Note: Published as Maisy's Favorite Toys in the US)	Board book	2001	9780744544107
34	Maisy's Garden Sticker Book (Note: Published as Maisy's Garden: A Sticker Book in the US)	Activity book	2001	9780744557336
35	Maisy's Morning on the Farm	Interactive book (tabbed)	2001	9780763616113 (Candlewick Press)
36	Fun with Maisy (Note: Published as Fun with Maisy: A Sticker Book in the US)	Activity book	2002	9780613747615
37	Maisy Cleans Up (Note: Later published as Maisy Tidies Up in the UK, AU, & NZ)	Board book	2002	9780613513159 (Candlewick Press)
38	Maisy Goes to Work (Note: Published as Maisy Goes to Work: A Sticker Book in the US)	Activity book	2002	9780744589832
39	Maisy Makes Lemonade	Board book	2002	9780763617295 (Candlewick Press)
40	Maisy's Fire Engine	Shaped board book	2002	9780744592269
41	Maisy's Train	Shaped board book	2002	9780744592252
42	Maisy's Year	Concept book (seasons)	2002	9780744592481
43	What's the Time, Maisy?	Interactive book (clock hands)	2002	9780744592245
44	Go, Maisy, Go!	Concept book	2003	9780744596960
45	Maisy's Christmas Eve (Note: Published as Maisy's Snowy Christmas Eve in the US)	Picture book	2003	9780744557671
46	Maisy's Easter Egg Hunt: A Sticker Book (Note: US Edition of Maisy's Hide-and-Seek Sticker Book)	Activity book	2003	9780763620714 (Candlewick Press)
47	Maisy's Hide-and-Seek Sticker Book	Activity book	2003	9780744594942
48	Maisy's Rainbow Dream	Picture book	2003	9780744557633
49	Is this Maisy's House? (Note: Later published as Maisy's House and Garden in the UK, AU, & NZ & Maisy's House and Garden Pop-Up Play Set A Carousel Play Book in the US)	Pop-up book (carousel)	2004	9781844286690
50	Maisy Goes Camping	Picture book	2004	9781844286614
51	Maisy's Christmas Sticker Book	Activity book	2004	9781844286645
52	Maisy's Treasure Hunt (Note: Published as Maisy's Pirate Treasure Hunt in the US)	Picture book	2004	9781844286652
53	With Love from Maisy (Note: Later published as Maisy's Christmas Presents in the UK, AU, & NZ)	Interactive book (lift-the-flap)	2004	9780763625139 (Candlewick Press)
54	Ha-ha, Maisy!	Concept book (humour)	2005	9781844286829
55	Maisy Goes to the Library	Picture book	2005	9780763626693 (Candlewick Press)
56	Maisy's Paint Book (Note: Published as Maisy's Easter Paint Book in the US)	Activity book	2005	9781844286782
57	Maisy's Spooky Sticker Book (Note: Published as Maisy's Trick-or-Treat Sticker Book in the US)	Activity book	2005	9781844286966
58	Stop and Go, Maisy!	Concept book (opposites)	2005	9780763626686 (Candlewick Press)
59	Sweet Dreams, Maisy	Board book	2005	9781844287086
60	Maisy, Charley, and the Wobbly Tooth	Board book	2006	9781844281862
61	Maisy's First Game Book	Interactive book (game)	2006	9781844286959
62	Maisy Big, Maisy Small (Note: Later published as Maisy Big, Maisy Small: A Book of Maisy Opposites in the UK, AU, & NZ & Maisy Big, Maisy Small: a Book of Rhyming Opposites in the US)	Concept book (opposites)	2007	9781406304893
63	Maisy Goes to Hospital (Note: Published as Maisy Goes to the Hospital in the US)	Picture book	2007	9781406304909
64	Maisy's Christmas Day	Board book	2008	9781406313628
65	Maisy Goes to the Museum	Board book	2008	9781406313369
66	Maisy Bakes a Cake	Interactive book (tabbed)	2009	9781406314786
67	Maisy's Animals	Concept book (animals)	2009	9781406306934
68	Maisy's Clothes/La ropa de Maisy: A Maisy Dual Language Book	Concept book (bilingual)	2009	9780744581553
69	Maisy Goes on Holiday (Note: Published as Maisy Goes on Vacation in the US)	Picture book	2010	9781406323702
70	Maisy Goes to the City	Picture book	2011	9781406327366
71	Hop, Skip and Jump, Maisy!	Interactive book (action)	2012	9781406333725
72	Maisy Goes on a Sleepover	Picture book	2012	9781406337457
73	Maisy's Band	Interactive book (novelty)	2012	9781406337297
74	Doodle with Maisy	Activity book	2013	9781406344998
75	Make with Maisy (Note: Published as Create with Maisy in the US)	Activity book	2013	9781406339659
76	Maisy Learns to Swim	Picture book	2013	9781406344271
77	Maisy Goes to the Cinema (Note: Published as Maisy Goes to the Movies in the US)	Picture book	2014	9781406349542
78	Maisy Plays Football (Note: Published as Maisy Plays Soccer in the US)	Picture book	2014	9781406354690
79	Maisy's Christmas Tree	Shaped board book	2014	9781406356267
80	Maisy's Plane (Note: Published as Maisy Goes on a Plane in the US)	Shaped board book	2014	9781406352313
81	Count with Maisy, Cheep, Cheep, Cheep!	Concept book (counting)	2015	9781406357318
82	Maisy's Birthday Party Sticker Book	Activity book	2015	9781406356403
83	Maisy Goes to London	Picture book	2016	9781406358735
84	Maisy's Moon Landing: A Maisy First Science Book	Concept book (science)	2016	9781406364293
85	Beep, Beep, Maisy	Shaped board book	2017	9781406372618
86	Maisy Goes to the Bookshop (Note: Published as Maisy Goes to the Local Bookstore in the US)	Picture book	2017	9781406369847
87	Maisy's Boat (Note: Published as Maisy's Sailboat in the US)	Shaped board book	2017	9781406369830
88	Maisy Goes to a Wedding	Picture book	2018	9781406378511
89	Maisy at Home: A First Words Book	Concept book (first words)	2019	9781406379464
90	Maisy Goes to a Show	Picture book	2019	9781406383539
91	Maisy's Day Out (Note: Later published as Maisy's Day Out: A First Words Book in the US)	Concept book (first words)	2019	9781406379457
92	Maisy Gets a Pet	Picture book	2020	9781406389746
93	Maisy's Chinese New Year	Concept book (culture)	2020	9781406395341
94	Maisy's Surprise Birthday Party	Picture book	2021	9781406395112
95	Maisy at Work: A First Words Book	Concept book (first words)	2022	9781529501469
96	Maisy Goes on a Nature Walk	Picture book	2022	9781529501445
97	Maisy's Town: A First Words Book	Concept book (first words)	2022	9781529501452
98	Maisy Goes to the Dentist	Picture book	2023	9781529512625
99	Maisy's Ambulance	Shaped board book	2023	9781529512601
100	Maisy's Recycling Truck	Shaped board book	2023	9781529512618
101	Maisy Goes for an Eye Test (Note: Published as Maisy Goes to the Eye Doctor in the US)	Picture book	2024	9781529517514
102	Maisy Loves Bees: A Maisy's Planet Book	Concept board book (nature)	2024	9781536228588 (Candlewick Press)
103	Maisy Loves Birds: A Maisy's Planet Book	Concept board book (nature)	2024	9781529510867
104	Maisy Loves Trees: A Maisy's Planet Book	Concept board book (nature)	2024	9781406351989
105	Maisy Loves Water: A Maisy's Planet Book	Concept board book (nature)	2024	9781529519884
106	Maisy Loves Butterflies: A Maisy's Planet Book	Concept board book (nature)	2025	9781529523089
107	Maisy Loves Frogs: A Maisy's Planet Book	Concept board book (nature)	2025	9781529523119
108	Maisy Loves Jungles: A Maisy's Planet Book	Concept board book (nature)	2025	9781529523096
109	Maisy Loves Ladybirds: A Maisy's Planet Book (Published as Maisy Loves Ladybugs: a Maisy's Planet Book in the US)	Concept board book (nature)	2025	9781529523102
110	Maisy Goes on a Bike Ride	Picture book	2025	9781529523126

== Reception ==
The Maisy series has sold over 28 million copies globally. The books have been published in 29 languages.

The School Library Journal named Maisy as a "staple in early childhood reading". Rustin noted that Maisy books utilise repetitions and similarities, which is beneficial to child readers as it aids familiarity and understanding. In their book Language development, Rachel Rudman and Felicity Titjen state Maisy books support children's language development and understanding of social relationships and concepts. Maisy has also been recognised for its positive and equal gender representation in children's media.

=== Awards ===
- BookTrust Best Book Award in 2014 for Peck, Peck, Peck.
- Mathical Book List (2015–2021) - PreK Honor for Count with Maisy, Cheep, Cheep, Cheep!.

== Television adaptations ==
In 1999, a preschool animated children's television series based on the Maisy books was released. The show ran for one season and consisted of 26 episodes. In 2000, the show won the British Academy Children's Award for Pre-School Animation.

In 2024, a 2D animated television series titled My Friend Maisy entered development. The series is set to be co-produced by Trustbridge Entertainment and BBC Studios Kids & Family. Cecilia Persson, managing director of BBC Studios Kids & Family, stated the show will "embrace the legacy" of Cousin's Maisy books. My Friend Maisy is scheduled for release in 2026.
