= Mazie King =

American dancer, singer and vaudeville performer (1888–1968)

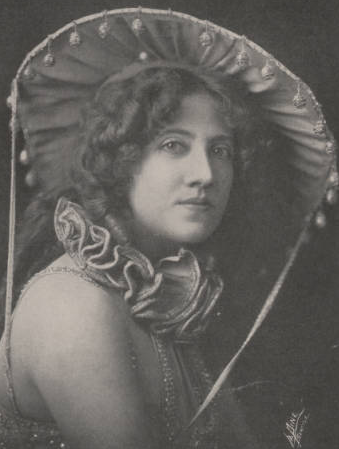
- Mazie King, from a 1916 publication.
- Born: January 14, 1888; New York City, New York, U.S.
- Died: November 1968 (aged 80); Montclair, New Jersey, U.S.
- Other names: Mazie Nourse; M. K. Patton
- Occupations: Dancer, Singer
- Years active: 1890s-1920s
- Known for: Toe dancing stunts, Vaudeville, Broadway
- Spouses: Harry Leonard (died 1908) Floyd Nourse (divorced 1914); John Patton (m. 1920)

Mazie King (January 14, 1888 – November 1968) was an American dancer, singer, and vaudeville performer.

== Career ==
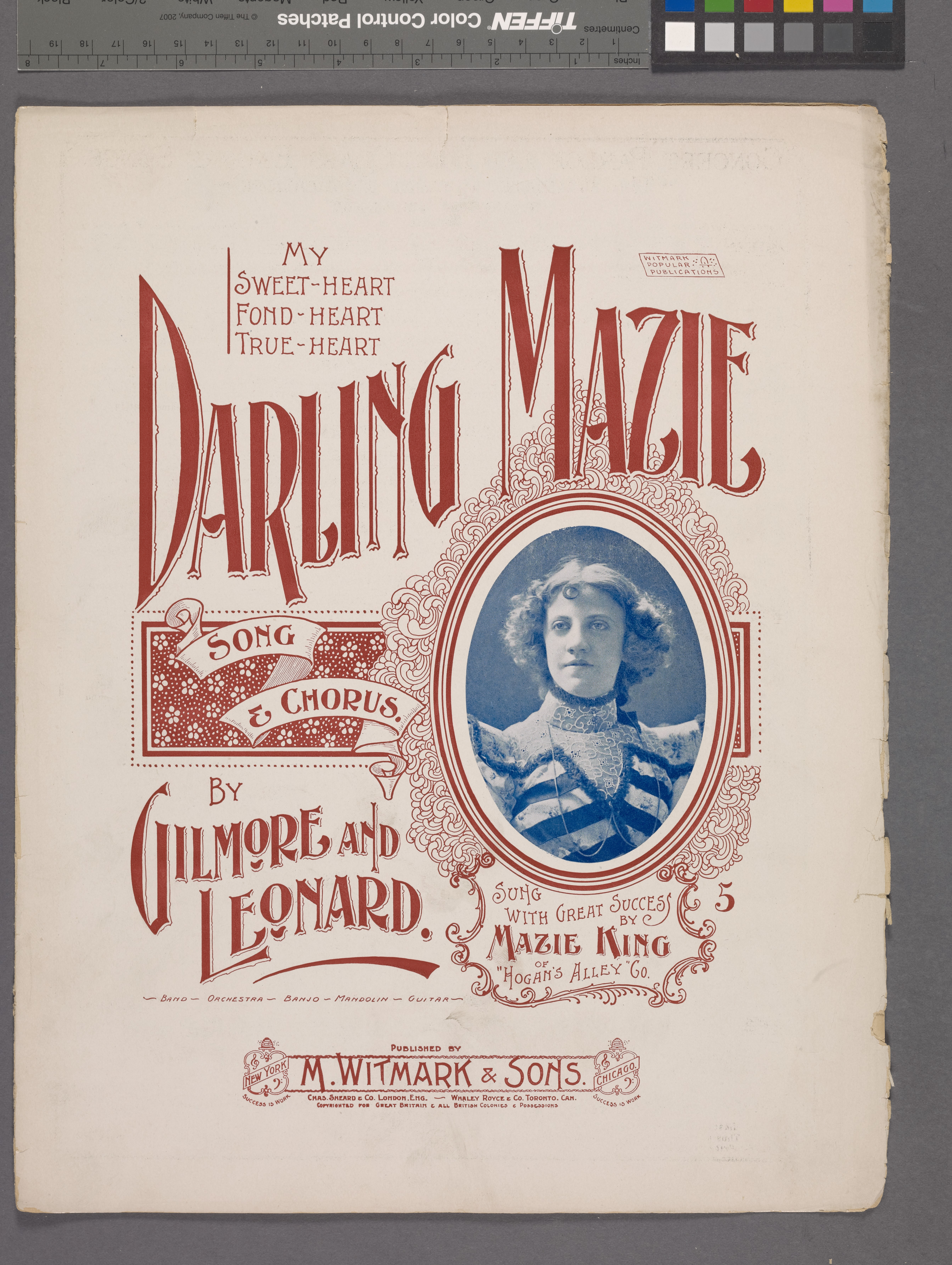
Sheet music for "Darling Mazie", featuring a photograph of Mazie King.

Mazie King danced on Broadway in three shows: The Mimic World (1908), The Hen-Pecks (1911), and The Doll Girl (1913). She was also in The Rising Generation (1895), Hogan's Alley (1896), The Midnight Sons (1910), The Passing Show of 1913, and Over the Top (1919). Dances and songs were named for Mazie King; sheet music featured her likeness.

She was in a touring show called Painting the Town in 1907. She toured in California as a dancer on the Orpheum vaudeville circuit in 1911, with her "artistic dance" titled "The Legend of the Spring". Sometimes she danced with partners, including Tyler Brooke in Boston in 1915, and E. E. Marini in Delaware in 1917. She was touring again in 1919, with a program called "Dance Jingles". When she was starring in a vaudeville program in 1920, her partner was Harry Ormond.

King drew publicity for various unusual reasons. She was considered the first dancer to have her foot x-rayed en pointe, in 1898. She was said to have her legs insured for $30,000 with Lloyd's of London. "Miss King is credited with being the only toe-dancer who has ever accomplished the feat of jumping from a table to the stage, alighting on her toes, and continuing her dance without intermission," noted one report in 1900. In 1910, she posed for miniature portraits to show her "old-fashioned" and "beautifully moulded" shoulders. She descended the stairs of New York's 45-story Metropolitan Life Building, en pointe, in 1911. In 1914, she repeated the feat at the Los Angeles Courthouse.

King took a break for a few seasons when she married late in 1920, but was back on the variety stage in 1923. In 1928 she registered Safety First: A Nautical Farce and A Tale of the Sea: A Nautical Farce for copyrights, under the name "Mazie King Patton".

== Personal life ==
Mazie King married a fellow vaudeville performer, comedian John F. "Harry" Leonard. He died in 1908. Her second husband was Floyd H. Nourse, a booking agent; they divorced in 1914. She married a third time in 1920, to John G. Patton, a restaurateur in Philadelphia.
