= Mazie Turner =

Australian artist (1954–2014)

- Born: Mazie Karen Turner; 1954; Sydney, New South Wales, Australia
- Died: 7 June 2014 (aged 59–60)
- Education: South Australian School of Art, University of Western Sydney, University of Newcastle (Australia)
- Known for: Photography
- Spouse: Richard Tipping

Mazie Karen Turner (1 November 1954 – 7 June 2014) was an artist from Newcastle, Australia. She worked in photography, sculpture and painting.

She was born in Sydney in 1954 to parents Jim and Zug Turner.

After completing an art school degree in Adelaide in 1979, she moved to Sydney with her partner Richard Tipping and lived in North Bondi from 1980 until 1984 when they left for Italy to take up a residency offered through the Visual Arts Board of the Australia Council.This opportunity was helped by a grant from the Dyason Bequest of the Art Gallery of New South Wales. Turner lived both near Milan and then in Venice for six months before moving to London and then to Oxford. She returned after nearly three years at the end of 1986 and lived in Sydney's Glebe until 1989 when she moved with her family to Newcastle, and then in 1992 to the lakeside town of Wangi Wangi until 2006 when she moved back to Newcastle. Turner had three children with partner Richard Tipping.

Turner's exhibitions included a significant painting show at Damien Minton Gallery in Sydney in 2013, from which the Drill Hall Gallery bought a major work.

She died in 2014. A commemorative sculpture by Tipping, titled Morning (2007) features in the Lake Macquarie City Art Gallery's Sculpture Park.

She was commemorated in a memorial exhibition at Newcastle Art Gallery in September 2017. Turner's work was included in Part II of the Know My Name exhibition at the National Gallery of Australia from 2021 to 2022.

== Education and work ==
Turner achieved a Bachelor of Fine Arts in printmaking and photography at the South Australian School of Art (1976). She later studied a Master of Arts with honours at the University of Western Sydney (1994). She completed a PhD in fine art at the University of Newcastle (2008) on colour theory in painting.

She lectured and taught fine art at both the University of Newcastle and Hunter TAFE's Newcastle Art School.

== Exhibitions ==
=== Solo exhibitions ===
- Bondi Pavilion, 1982
- Bitumen River Gallery, ACT, 1983
- JamFactory, Adelaide, 1983
- International Gallery, Milan, Italy, 1984
- Somerville College, Oxford, UK, 1986
- Salience (A Silience). Paintings by Ma/ze Turner, 3 June - 5 July 1997
- maize k turner: resilience, Gitte Weise Gallery, 28 July - 22 August 1998
- Mazie K. Turner: Oves, Gitte Weise Gallery, 22 November - 17 December 2000
- Mazie Turner: Colour Sweeps Over Dark Grounds, Gitte Weise Gallery, 30 April - 31 May 2003
- Mazie Turner: a selection of work from the studio, Damien Minton Gallery, Redfern, 2013
- Mazie Karen Turner: Between dream and earth, Newcastle Art Gallery, 2 September - 5 November 2017
- The Art of Maizie Turner, Moree Plains Gallery, 1 June - 31 August 2013

=== Group exhibitions ===
- Holdsworth Galleries, 1987
- King St. Gallery, 1988
- Nexus Nightclub, Newcastle, 1989
- Newcastle Contemporary Gallery, 1990
- Greenhill Galleries, Adelaide, 1991
- Jan Taylor Gallery, Sydney, 1991
- Lake's Edge Festival, Lake Macquarie, 9 November 2003
- Pandora's Box, Newcastle Art Space, August - September 2006
- Down Under Ground, Wieliczka Salt Mine, Drozdowice Chamber, Poland, July - September 2008
- Hothouse (staff exhibition), Newcastle Art School, 2012
- Out of the Blue: Celebrating 175 years of the cyanotype, Photospace School of Art & Design, ANU, 13–25 August 2017

=== Reviews ===
- Mazie Turner at the John Paynter Gallery by Helen Hopcroft

== Public collections ==
Turner's work is held in public collections including:

- Newcastle Art Gallery
- The University of Newcastle
- Artbank
- The Australian National University
- The Art Gallery of New South Wales
- The National Gallery of Victoria
  - Works listed under Karen Turner:
    - Desert She Oak trees, passing, maturing, into the night, Papunya, 1981-1982
    - Painting with Tutama and the children came to visit, the evening drawn, Papunya, 1981-1982
- The National Gallery of Australia
  - Works listed under Mazie Karen Turner:
    - Merry Christmas Oxford St., 1979
    - No title. (animal park with billboard), 1979
