= Mazie Follette =

American dancer, actress, vaudeville performer

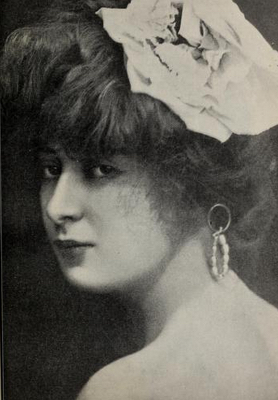
- Mazie Follette, from a 1901 publication.
- Other names: Mazie Folette; Mazie Follett
- Occupations: Showgirl, dancer, actress, poet
- Known for: Florodora girl, Testified at the Harry K. Thaw trial (1907)

Mazie Follette was an American dancer, actress, vaudeville performer, and Florodora girl. She also wrote poetry, and was a witness in the murder trial of Harry Kendall Thaw.

== Career ==
Mazie Follette studied dance with Filiberto Marcheti.

Follette danced, acted, and sang in soubrette roles. She left the company of Lulu Glaser in 1901, after she was accused of flirting with the audience. She was a "Florodora Girl", in the Florodora show at the Winter Garden in 1902. Broadway appearances by Follette included roles in Fiddle-dee-dee (1900–1901), The Prima Donna (1901), The Strollers (1901), The Sleeping Beauty and the Beast (1901–1902), The Supper Club (1901–1902), Twirly Whirly (1902), The Wild Rose (1902), The Big Little Princess (1903), Winsome Winnie (1903–1904), Princess Beggar (1906), and From Across the Pond (1907).

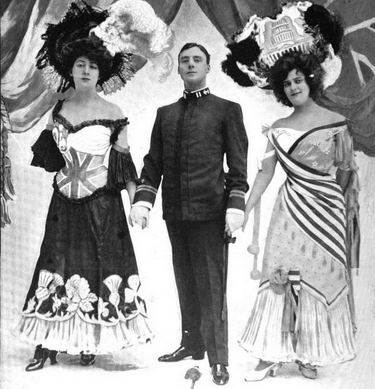
Mazie Follette, Harry Fairleigh, and Nellie Adams in The Prince of Pilsen, from a 1903 publication.

== The Thaw trial and aftermath ==
Follette was known for an extravagant social life; she once took a train from Chicago to New York with two young businessmen, to have a lobster dinner. She also tried to adopt a baby hippopotamus as a pet. "Flippant to strangers, the heroine of many humorous Broadway stories, unfortunately and unjustly mentioned in connection with several unpleasant escapades," Follette was part of Stanford White's social circle, and a confidante of Evelyn Nesbit before Nesbit married. She was sought to assist the prosecution at the highly publicized trial of Nesbit's husband, Harry Kendall Thaw, in 1907. "It is believed she knows more of Stanford White and the inner life and workings of Evelyn Thaw than any living person," reported one account.

After the trial, for a time, she worked on a plan to organize and train chorus girls. Follette also wrote poetry for publications, under a pen name. She was in vaudeville in 1908. Other works in her later career included The Gay Musician (1909), and Shorty McCabe (1911).

A showgirl character in the 1915 silent film Betty in Search of a Thrill is named "Maizie Follette".
