= Soft book =

Book for pre-readers

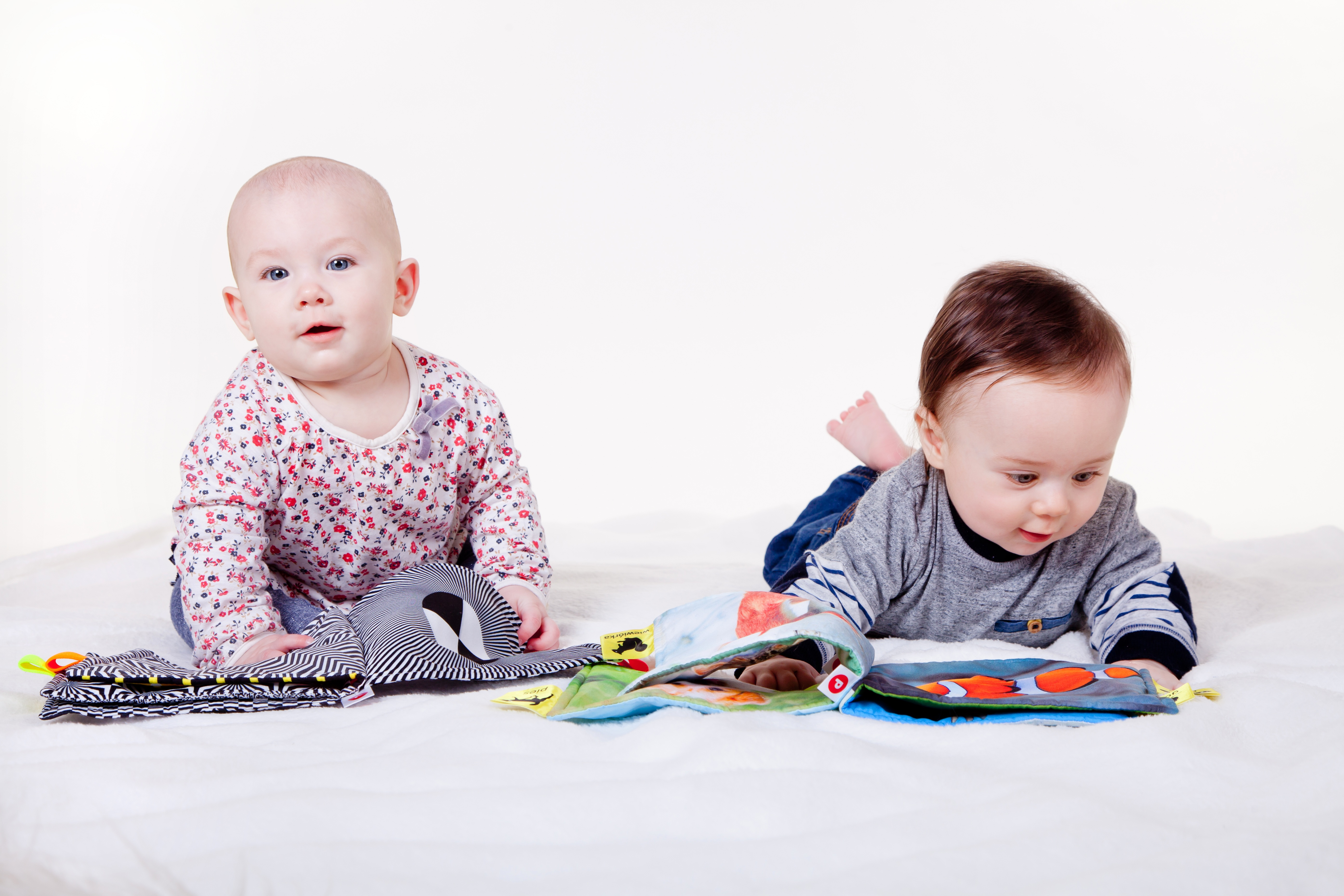
Two babies read a soft book

A soft book is a type of children's book intended for pre-readers aimed primarily at babies. Soft books are typically made of fabric, although they can also be made of soft plastic and used in the bath. They may also have an auditory component, such as cellophane sheets, to provide a crinkly sound. They may contain other features, including teething components, mirrors, flaps or different textures. Soft books typically feature no or very few words.

== See also ==
- Board book
