= Maisie Maxwell =

Australian actress and journalist

Maisie Maxwell BEM
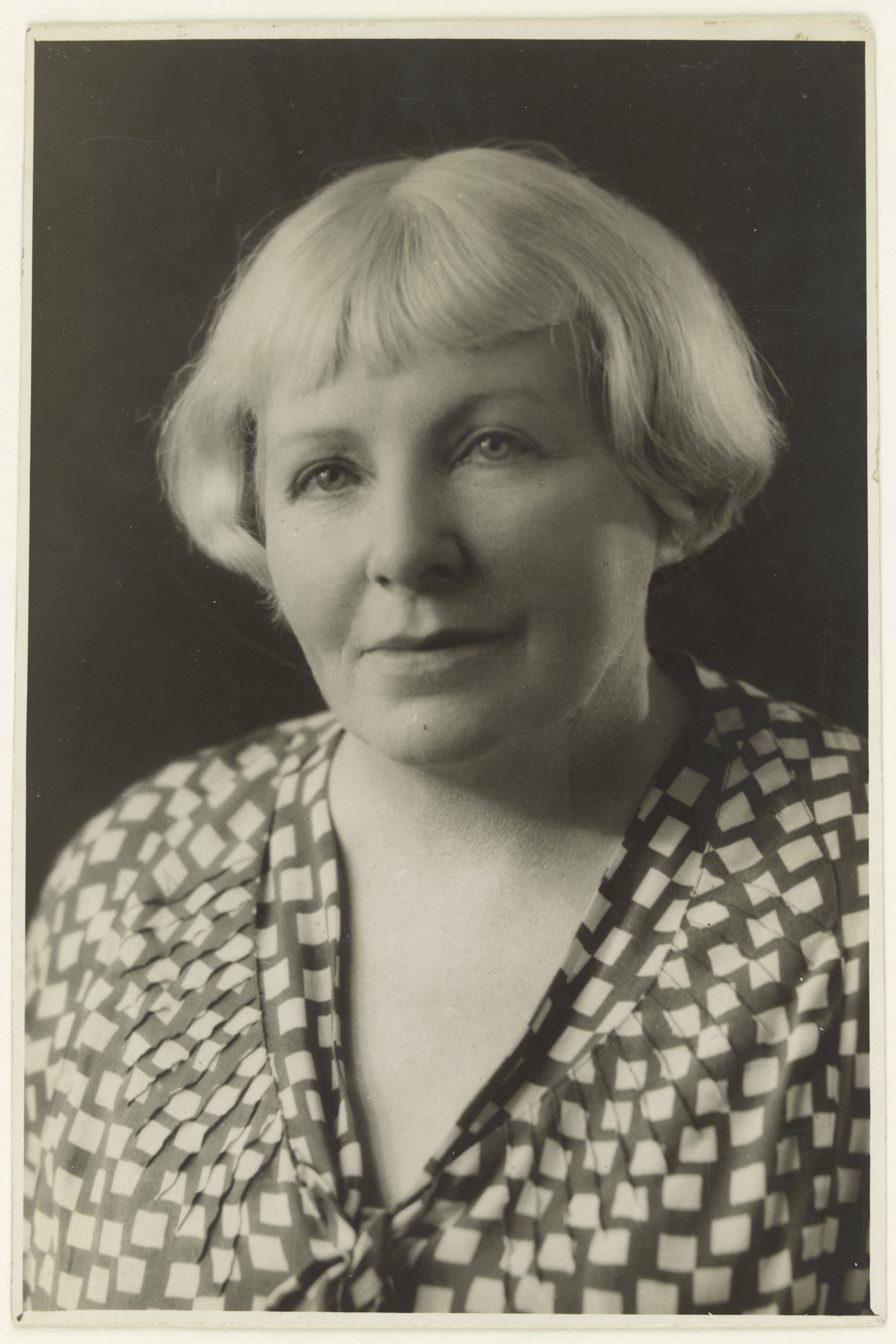
- Born: Mary Moorhead; 8 October 1876; Bendigo, Victoria, Australia
- Died: 24 July 1977 (aged 100); Jolimont, Victoria, Australia
- Other names: May Maxwell
- Occupation(s): Actress, journalist
- Years active: 1907–1977

Maisie Maxwell BEM (8 October 1876 – 24 July 1977) was an Australian stage actress and journalist born in Bendigo (then known as Sandhurst), Victoria.

Maxwell was awarded the British Empire Medal in 1969 for journalism. May Maxwell Crescent, in the Canberra suburb of Gilmore, is named in her honour.
