= Morningside, Edinburgh =

District of Edinburgh, Scotland

Coordinates: 55.925061°N 3.209411°W

Morningside
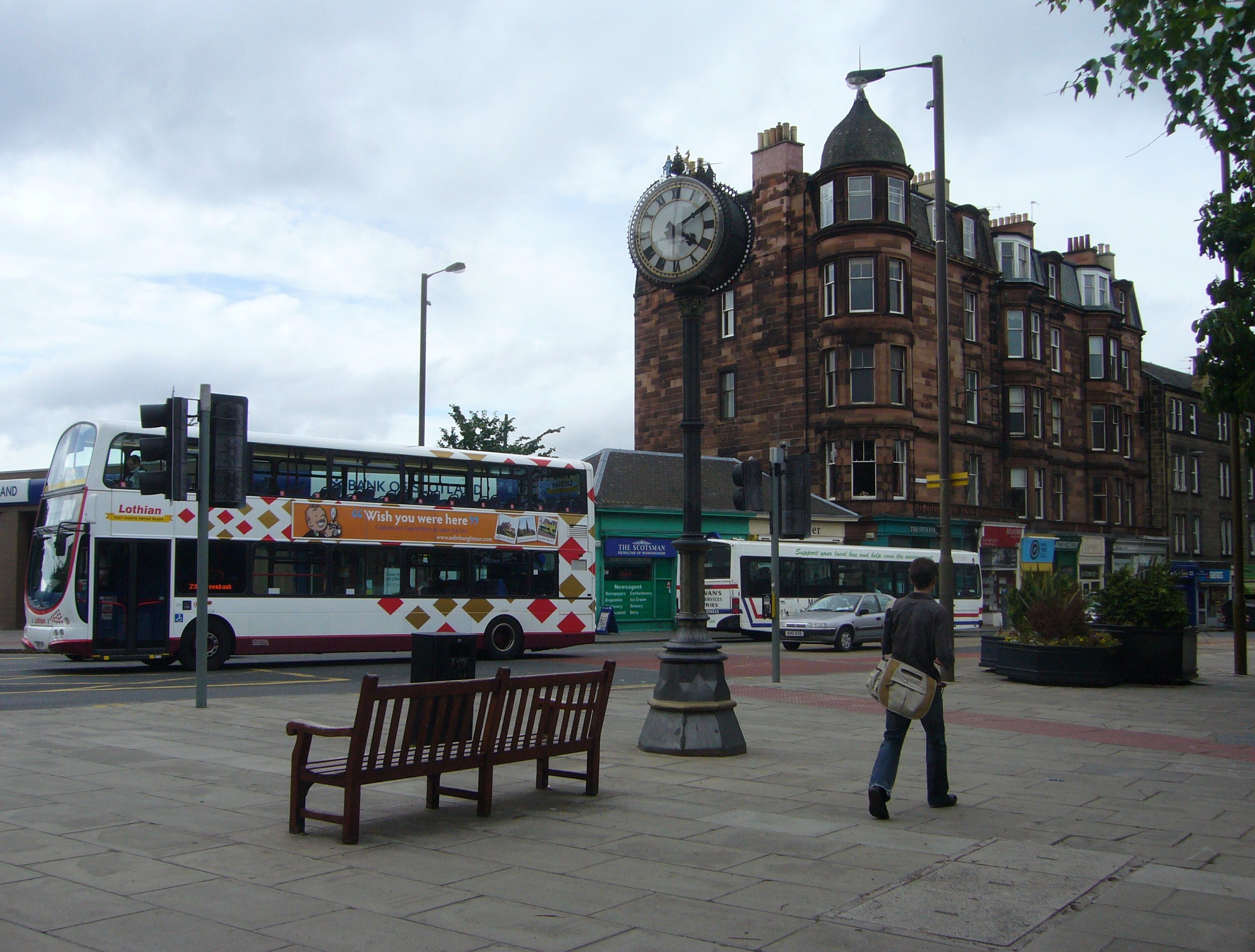
- Morningside Clock

- Location within the City of Edinburgh council area Location within Scotland
- Population: 31,379
- OS grid reference: NT244708
- Council area: City of Edinburgh
- Country: Scotland
- Sovereign state: United Kingdom
- Post town: Edinburgh
- Postcode district: EH10
- Dialling code: 0131 (446, 447, 452)
- Police: Scotland
- Fire: Scottish
- Ambulance: Scottish
- UK Parliament: Edinburgh South
- Scottish Parliament: Edinburgh Southern

Morningside is a district and former village in the south of Edinburgh, Scotland. It lies alongside the main arterial Morningside Road, part of an ancient route from Edinburgh to the south west of Scotland. The original village served several farms and estates in the area. In the 19th century, it developed as a residential suburb, its growth being stimulated by the arrival of a railway service and other transport improvements.

== Location ==
Morningside is located approximately 1.6 miles (2.5 kilometres) south of Edinburgh's city centre. It is bordered by Bruntsfield to the north, the Grange to the north east, Blackford to the east, Comiston to the south, Greenbank to the south west, and Merchiston to the north west. It includes Braidburn Valley Park, the Royal Edinburgh Hospital and parts of the Braid Hills and Blackford Hill.

The district is bisected by the A702 road, which forms part of an ancient route from Edinburgh to Biggar and the south west of Scotland.

The south eastern part of Morningside (approximately the area to the south of Canaan Lane and the east of Comiston Road) lies within the Morningside Conservation Area, which was designated in 1996.

== History ==
The village of Morningside grew up on part of the Burgh Muir, this being common ground that was gifted to Edinburgh by David I in the first half of the 12th century. In the late 16th century, the town council feued the western part of this land to pay for the huge cost of dealing with the plague that had swept the city in 1585. It is on this feued land that Morningside gradually developed.

The name Morningside first appeared on Richard Cooper's 1759 Plan of the City of Edinburgh and Adjacent Grounds. This showed Morningside as just three houses. Writing in 1882, James Grant described the original village as a 'row of thatched cottages, a line of trees and a blacksmith's forge'.

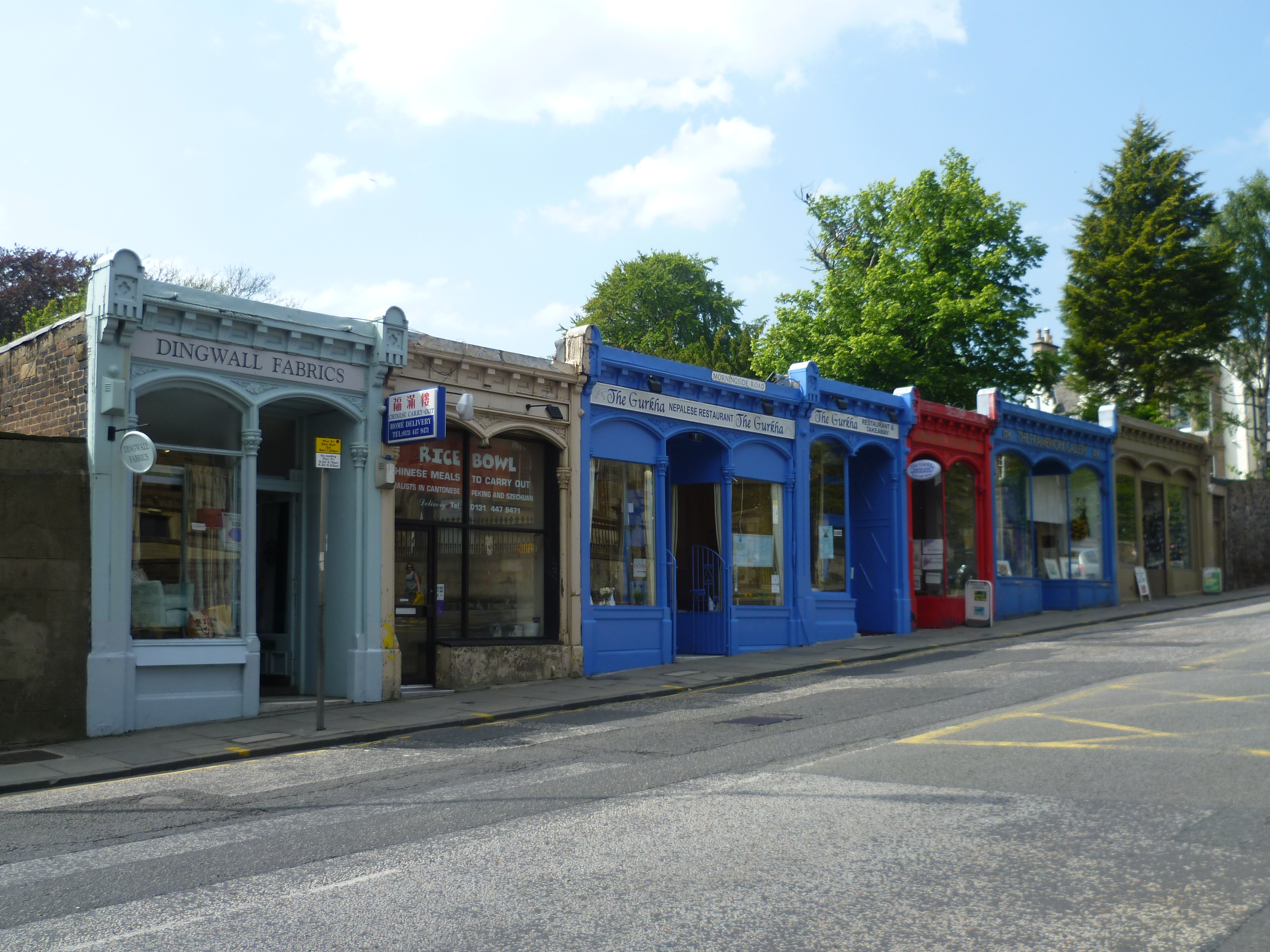
Victorian shops in Morningside Road

Morningside grew rapidly as an agricultural village, serving neighbouring farms and estates, including those of Canaan, Egypt, Plewlands and others. It became increasingly important as the first stopping place on the principal drove road into Edinburgh from the farms to the south.

The district developed as a residential suburb from the early 19th century. It attracted many of Edinburgh's wealthier citizens who built villas and mansion houses on large plots obtained from the sub-division of the nearby estates. By the 1850s much of the present street pattern had been established.

Later in the 19th century, the growth of the suburb was accelerated by developments in transport. In the 1870s, a tram service—one of the first of its kind in Edinburgh—provided a direct link with the east end of Princes Street in the city centre. These horse-drawn trams were later replaced by cable cars and then by electric trams. An even bigger boost came in 1885 with the opening of the Edinburgh Suburban and South Side Junction Railway. This carried passengers between Morningside Road Station and Waverley Station, while freight, including livestock and coal, was carried to and from the goods yard in Maxwell Street. In the 1890s, the Braid Estate was developed for housing, covering the area around Nile Grove, Cluny Avenue and Cluny Drive. By the first half of the 20th century, Morningside was well established, with schools, churches, a public library, a cinema and a ballroom.

=== Origins of street names ===
The origin of the name Morningside is uncertain. According to some sources, it is derived from the village's location on the sunny south-facing or 'morning side' of the city, but Stuart Harris says that it is more likely to be just a 'fancy' name, invented as a caprice by one of the estate owners.

The biblical references in several street names (Canaan Lane, Egypt Mews, Jordan Lane, Nile Grove, etc.) are also of uncertain origin. A generally accepted theory is that they are an allusion to Little Egypt Farm, which was situated between Braid Road and Blackford Hill. The farm might owe its name to an encampment of Romanies who established themselves in the area after their expulsion from the city in 1540. (Romanies were at the time believed to have originated in Egypt; the name 'gypsy' might be derived from 'Egyptian'.)

The Braid area, with street names such as Braid Road and Braidburn Terrace, is named for the estate of Sir Henry de Brade, a 12th century sheriff of Edinburgh. The estate's name in turn derives from the Gaelic bràghaid, meaning a throat or gorge; this refers to the deep cut in the Braid Burn near the present Braidburn Valley Park.

Cluny (as in Cluny Gardens, Cluny Drive, etc.), Corrennie (Corrennie Gardens, Corrennie Drive) and Midmar Gardens are named after properties in Aberdeenshire owned by the Gordon family, who owned the Braid Estate in the late 19th century.

The name Falcon appears in several street names (Falcon Road, Falcon Avenue, etc.). These were built in the 20th century on the site of Falcon Hall, which was demolished in 1909.

== Notable buildings ==
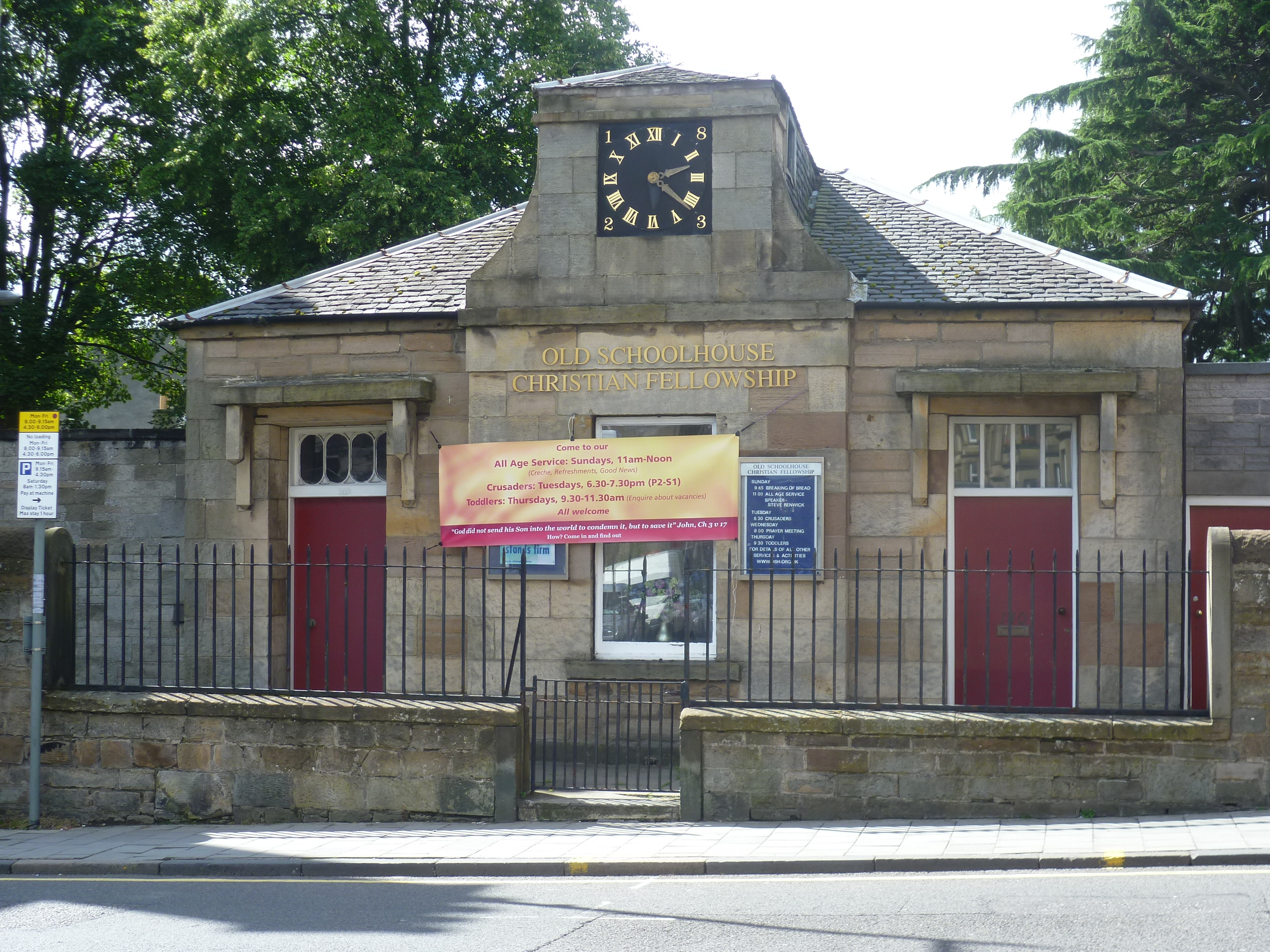
Old School House, Morningside Road

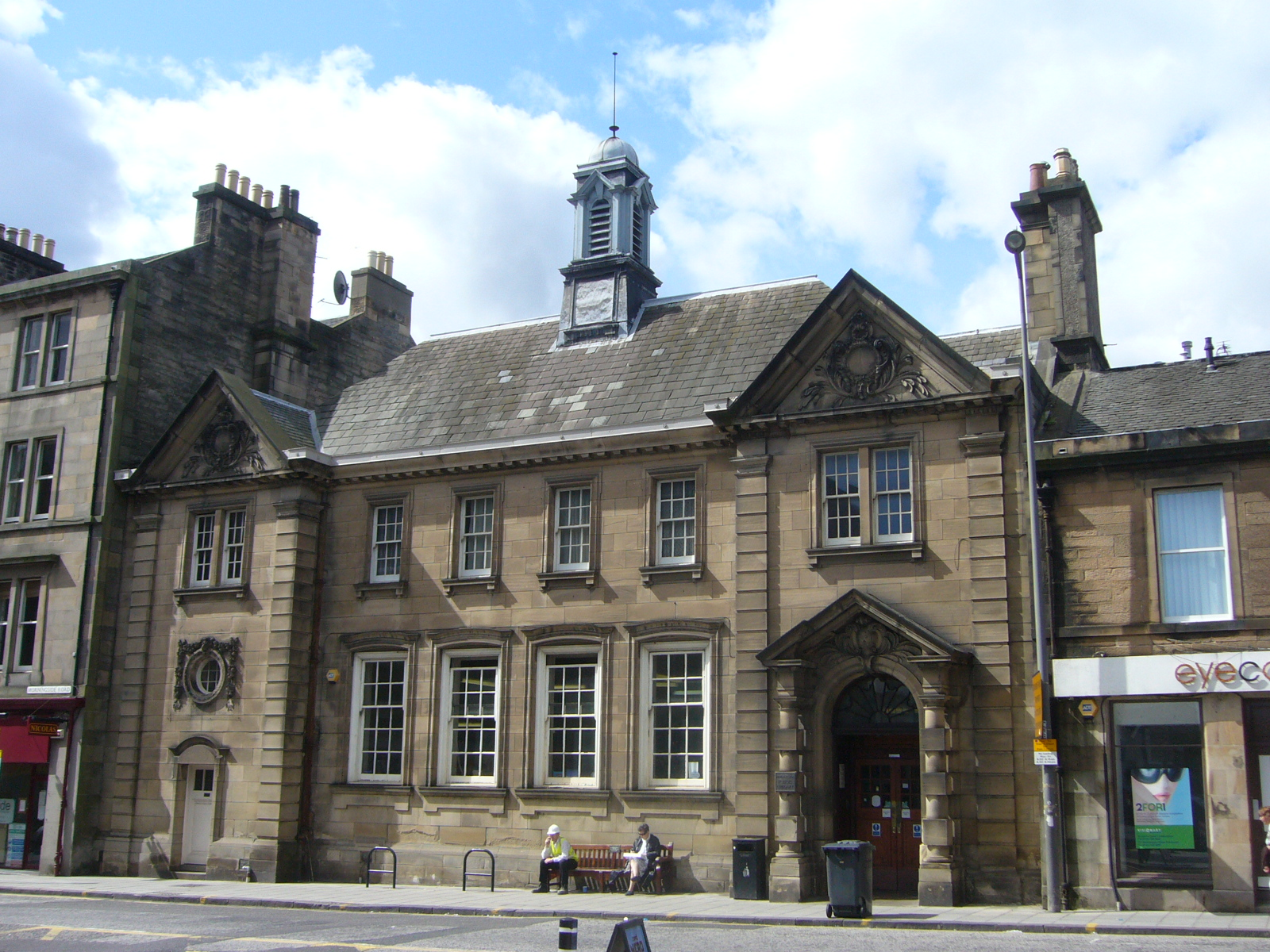
Morningside Library

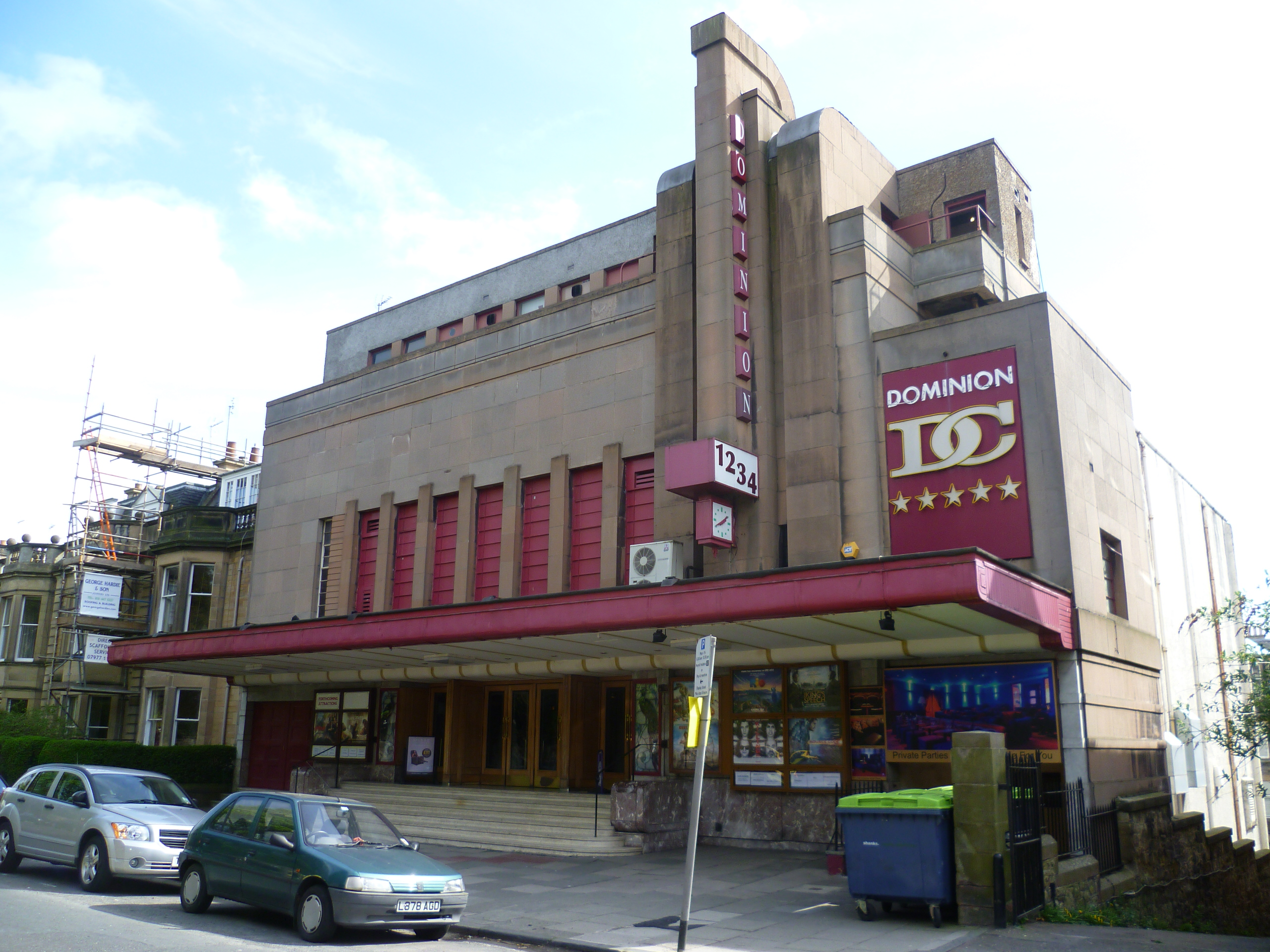
Dominion Cinema

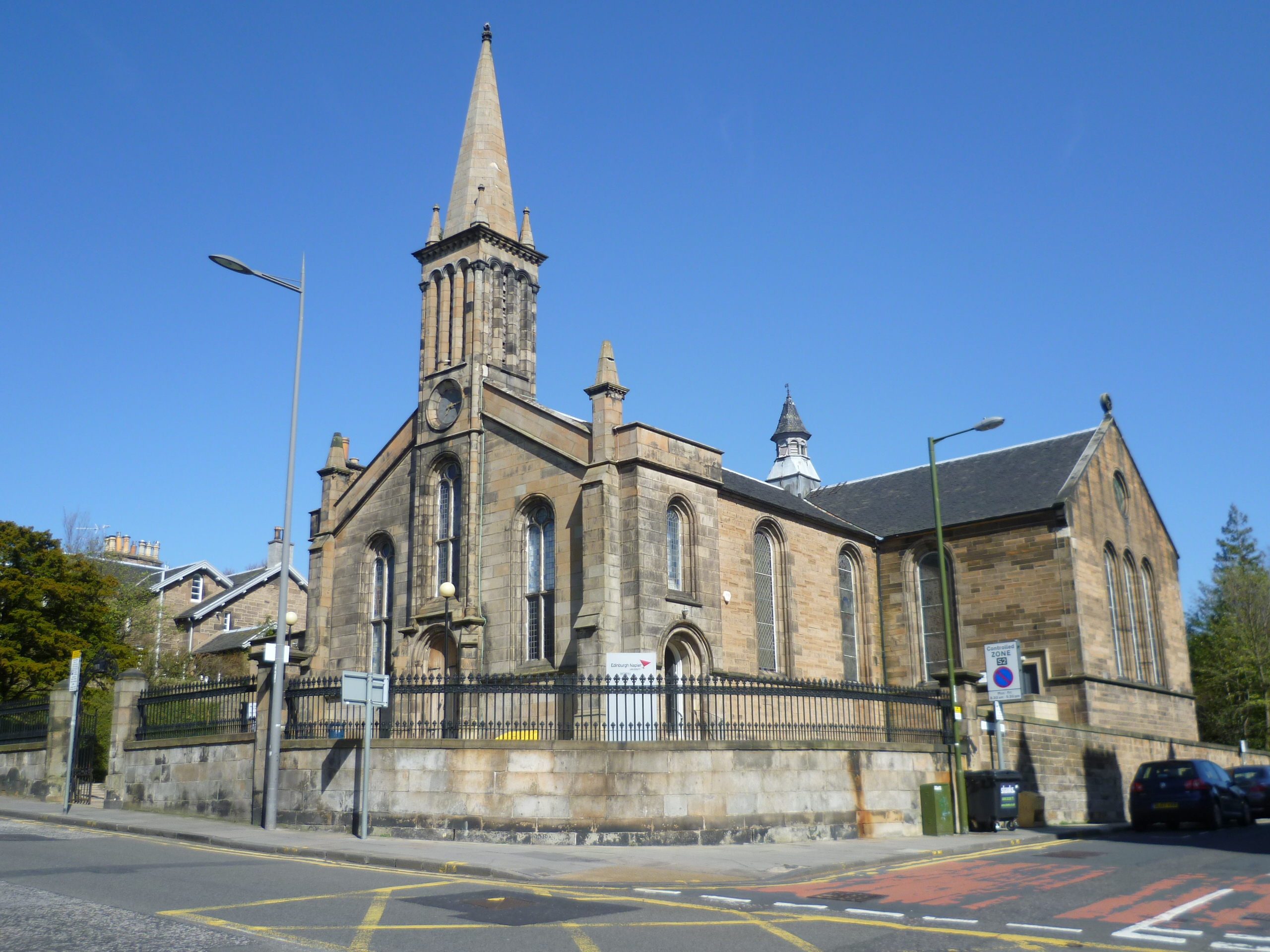
Former Morningside Parish Church

- The Old Schoolhouse, 140 Morningside Road. A single-story double-fronted house with a small clock tower, built in 1823 and extended in 1980. It served as the village school until 1892 when South Morningside Primary School opened. It was also used for church services before the opening of Morningside Parish Church in 1838. It is now occupied by the Cornerstone Church.
- Morningside Public Library, 184 Morningside Road, on the site of the village smiddy. It was designed by the city architect, Robert Morham, and built at a cost of £6,000. It was opened in 1905 and extended in 1929. In the 1970s, it was one of the busiest libraries in Scotland.
- Dominion Cinema, 18 Newbattle Terrace. A classic example of Streamline Moderne architecture. The cinema has been owned and operated by the same family since its opening in 1938. It is one of the few surviving independent cinemas in Scotland.
- Church Hill Theatre, 33 Morningside Road. Originally the Morningside High Church, designed by Hippolyte Blanc. The building was converted into a theatre in the 1960s, and is now used by amateur theatre companies and as a venue for the Edinburgh Festival Fringe and the Edinburgh International Festival. A granite monument in the forecourt contains carvings reflecting local life and events as well as the names of local areas and villages.
- Canaan Lane Primary School. A modern two-storey building finished in natural sandstone and Corten steel, designed by Holmes Miller. The building was completed in April 2022 with the first pupils admitted in August 2022.

=== Churches ===
- Braid Church, 1 Nile Grove. A distinctive octagonal structure designed by George Washington Browne and opened in 1886. Originally used by the Church of Scotland, it is now a pizza restaurant.
- Morningside Parish Church, on the corner of Braid Road and Cluny Gardens. A building in the English Gothic style. Originally St Matthew’s Church, it was designed by Hippolyte Blanc and opened in 1890. The present church is a union of five former churches in the district, including the original Morningside Parish Church on the corner of Newbattle Terrace and Morningside Road.
- Former Morningside Parish Church, on the corner of Newbattle Terrace and Morningside Road. Opened in 1838, this was the first permanent church in Morningside. It closed in 1990 after amalgamating with the Braid Church. The building is now used by Edinburgh Napier University.
- St Peter's Church, 77 Falcon Avenue. A Roman Catholic parish church. It was designed by Sir Robert Lorimer, and built from 1906 to 1907. The nave was extended in 1928–29. It has a distinctive Italianate campanile.

=== Former buildings ===
- Morningside House. Situated on the west side of Morningside Road just south of where the public library now stands, this was the principal manor house of the original village. It was a modest house in a simple style, with a front garden and extensive grounds to the rear. It is not known for certain when the house was built, but its first recorded occupant—and possibly its builder—was Lord Gardenstone, who acquired the land in 1789. The house was demolished in 1895.
- Falcon Hall. This was the largest and grandest residence in Morningside—more so than Morningside House—standing in 18 acres (7.3 ha) of grounds on the east side of Morningside Road between Canaan Lane and Newbattle Terrace. It was built in 1780 for William Coulter and was originally named Morningside Lodge. It was later acquired by Alexander Falconer who, in 1815, commissioned Thomas Hamilton to add a neoclassical facade. Falconer also renamed the house to reflect his own name. The last resident was the cartographer John George Bartholomew. The house was demolished in 1909. The original ornamental gates now form the entrance to Edinburgh Zoo. The impressive portico and internal staircase survive at the former Bartholomew works in Duncan Street (now residential flats).
- Toll House. Originally located at the southern end of Morningside Road, on the south bank of the Jordan Burn. It was in operation from the 1850s until the abolition of road tolls in Scotland in 1883. In 1888, it was dismantled and re-erected as a gatehouse at the entrance to the Hermitage of Braid, where it still stands. It is now a café.

=== Other landmarks ===
- Bore Stone. A stone pillar, built into the wall of the former Morningside Parish Church, on the corner of Morningside Road and Newbattle Terrace. According to a plaque mounted in the stone, it is where the Royal Standard was pitched for the muster of the Scottish army prior to their departure for the Battle of Flodden in 1513. However, this claim is widely disputed by historians.
- Morningside Clock. A prominent clock on a cast-iron pillar. It was the work of the Saracen Foundry in Glasgow and was erected in 1910. It originally stood in the middle of the road in front of Morningside Road Station. In 2017, it was restored by the firm of James Ritchie. It now stands on the east side of Morningside Road near the junction with Cluny Gardens.
- Hanging Stanes. Two sets of stones embedded in the surface of Braid Road. They formed the foundation of a scaffold erected specifically for the hanging of Thomas Kelly and Henry O'Neill on 25 January 1815. This is thought to be the last public execution for highway robbery in Scotland. The hanging took place at the scene of the crime.
- Edinburgh Wild West. A lane behind the library that has been decorated as an American Wild West town for a furniture shop advertising campaign and has since become a minor tourist attraction.

== Notable residents ==
- Francis Garden, Lord Gardenstone (1721–1793), lawyer, judge and joint Solicitor General for Scotland from 1760 to 1764. He was the first occupant of Morningside House.
- David Deuchar (1743–1808), etcher and engraver. He was an early occupant of Morningside House, which he acquired in 1795. He is credited with having 'discovered' the portraitist Henry Raeburn.
- Thomas Chalmers (1780–1847), minister of religion and founder of the Free Church of Scotland. He lived at 2 Morningside Place and later at 1 Churchill, and occasionally preached at the Old Schoolhouse.
- Susan Edmonstone Ferrier (1782–1854), satirical novelist, known as the "Scottish Jane Austen", lived in East Morningside House in the early 19th century. A metal plaque on the gate post records her time there.
- George Meikle Kemp (1795–1844), self-taught architect who designed the Scott Monument in Princes Street Gardens. He was living in Ainslie Cottage in Jordan Lane at the time of his death.
- Sam Bough (1822–1878) landscape painter, lived in Jordan Lane.
- Hannah MacGoun (1864-1913) artist, lived at 69 Morningside Road.
- Reginald Johnston (1874–1938), British diplomat who from 1919 to 1924 served as the tutor and advisor to Puyi, the last Emperor of China; born in Jordan Lane.
- Charles d'Orville Pilkington Jackson (1887–1973), prolific sculptor, best known for his statue of Robert the Bruce at Bannockburn; lived at 17 Jordan Lane.
- Ronald Fairbairn (1889-1964), psychiatrist and psychoanalyst; lived in Cluny Gardens.
- John Smith (1938-1994), leader of the British Labour Party from 1992 to 1994. His funeral service at Morningside Parish Church in 1994 was attended by almost one thousand people, including many leading figures of the British establishment.

== Morningside today ==
Today Morningside is a thriving residential district. Its main shopping street, Morningside Road, is noted for its variety of shops and cafés, many of which are independent businesses. The district has three primary schools, several churches, a public library, a cinema and a theatre. Many of the 19th century Victorian and Edwardian villas survive, but the predominant form of housing, especially in the northern part of the district, now consists of Victorian tenements. Bungalows and detached and semi-detached houses are more common in the less densely populated areas to the south of the railway line.

The population of the Morningside local government ward stands at 31,379 (as at 2021).

Although passenger trains serving Morningside Road Station were withdrawn in 1962, the suburb still enjoys good transport links with the city centre, being served by Lothian Buses routes 5, 11, 15, 16, 23, 36 and 38.

== In popular culture ==
Muriel Spark's 1961 novel The Prime of Miss Jean Brodie is set partly in Morningside. Brodie is a teacher at the Marcia Blaine School for Girls, the model for which was James Gillespie's School for Girls in nearby Marchmont. Spark herself attended the school from 1923 to 1935.

The district is mentioned in the song "Then I Met You", written and performed by Scottish duo The Proclaimers, from their 1988 album Sunshine on Leith.

A kitten named Maisie MacKenzie, also known as Maisie from Morningside, is the title character in a series of children's books by Aileen Paterson. In 2011, Lothian Buses added an image of Maisie to the livery of the No. 5 bus, which serves Morningside.

The so-called 'Morningside accent' is often portrayed—and caricatured—in popular culture as an over-refined and affected "pan loaf" accent, similar to a perceived upper-class English accent. By extension, the same characteristics are sometimes attributed to the attitudes and behaviour of Morningside residents. The accent was famously used by Maggie Smith in her portrayal of the title character in the 1969 film version of The Prime of Miss Jean Brodie.
