= Aileen Paterson =

Scottish writer and illustrator

Aileen Francis Paterson MBE
- Born: 30 November 1934; Burntisland, Fife, Scotland
- Died: 23 March 2018 (aged 83); Edinburgh, Scotland
- Occupations: Author and Illustrator
- Children: 4 daughters, 2 sons

Aileen Francis Paterson (née Henderson) MBE (30 November 1934 – 23 March 2018) was a Scottish writer and illustrator, best known for her series of children's books about Maisie MacKenzie, the kitten.

== Biography ==
Aileen Paterson was born in the Fife town of Burntisland to William and Helen Henderson. As a child, she moved to Kirkcaldy, before gaining a place at Edinburgh Art College in 1951, where she specialised in pottery. She gained a diploma in designs and craft in 1955 and worked at the Portobello potteries in Edinburgh.

After marrying her first husband, Bayo Ayodeji, in 1955, she moved to Dublin, Ireland. After the marriage ended in divorce, Paterson moved back to Kirkcaldy and earned an education qualification in 1962. She worked as an art teacher in Fife in the 1960s.

For most of her adult life, she lived in Edinburgh and was a passionate supporter of that city. She worked as an art teacher between the 1960s to 1980s.

The title of her first book, Maisie Comes to Morningside (1984), was inspired by the American crime writer Chester Himes' book Cotton Comes to Harlem (1965).

Maisie Mackenzie, the heroine of Paterson's series of children's books, wears a kilt and Fair Isle jumper and lives in Morningside, a suburb of Edinburgh. Maisie is described as a brave, adventurous kitten exploring a world that ultimately reinforces the good things in life such as friendship, food, fun, community and football. The witty and finely tuned social observations are praised for engaging adults as much as children.

Maisie's world is almost entirely populated by cats, so that although there is a belligerent budgie and the occasional horse, there are no dogs or humans. However, Maisie's adventures take place in real places (reflected in the books' illustrations) such as Edinburgh, Glasgow, Paris, and New York. Maisie Bites the Big Apple features the Marc Chagall murals in the Metropolitan Opera House.

Paterson's final book in the series (2006) sees Maisie investigating strange goings-on in Edinburgh's Botanic Gardens.

In 2011, Lothian Buses made Maisie the face of the Number 5 bus, which goes through the character's home district of Morningside.

Several stories were also turned into an animated series called Meeow! starring Stanley Baxter.

== Death and legacy ==
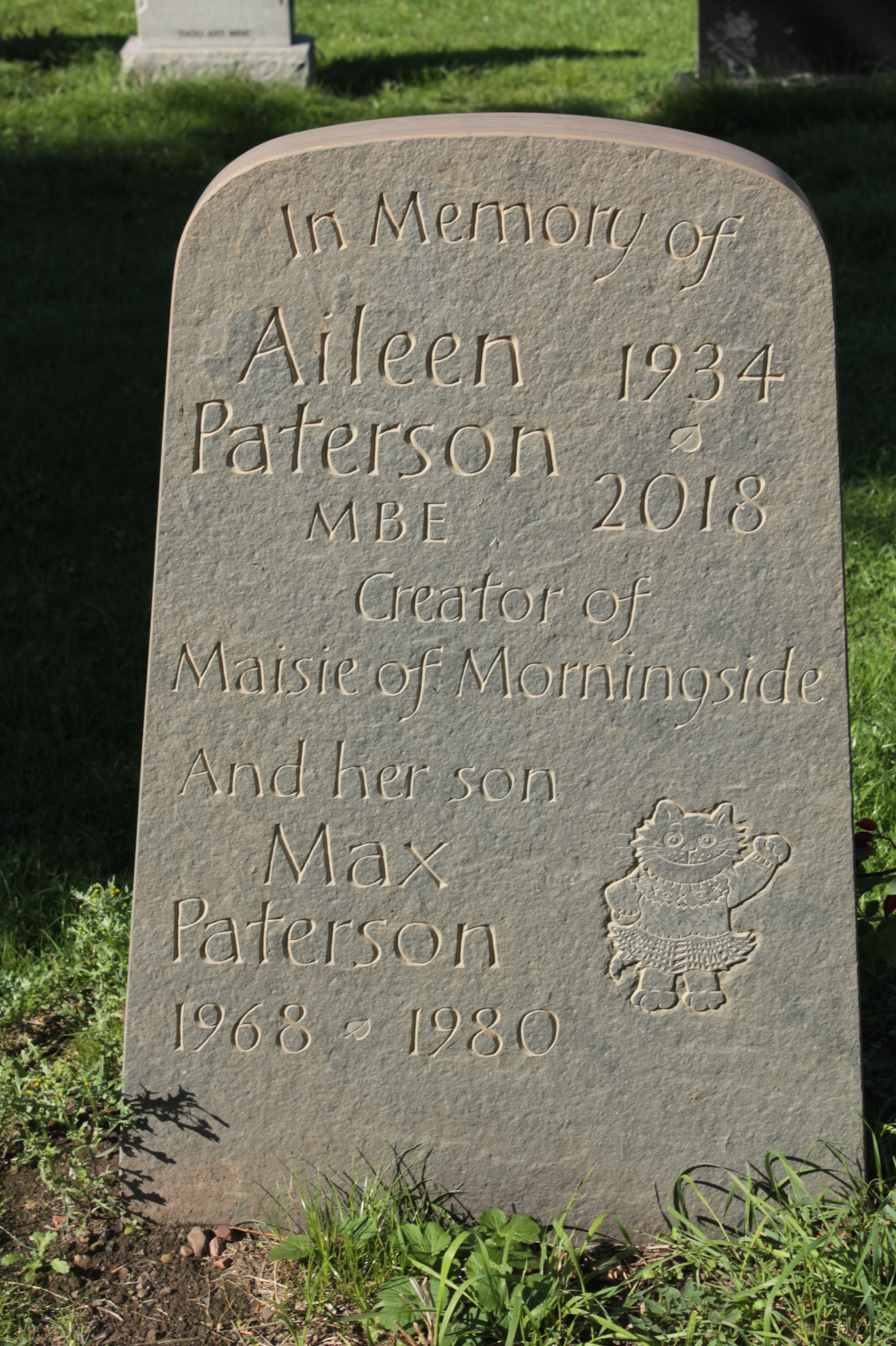
The grave of Aileen Paterson, Grange Cemetery

Paterson died on 23 March 2018 at the age of 83.

Following her death in 2018, a memorial stone featuring an image of 'Maisie of Morningside' was raised in Edinburgh's Grange Cemetery, on the site of her son Max's burial plot. The grave lies in the enclosed modern section to the west of the main cemetery.

== Awards and honours ==
In the 2015 Birthday Honours, she was awarded an MBE for services to children's literature.

== Selected works ==
1. Maisie comes to Morningside (1984)
2. Maisie goes to Glasgow (1984)
3. Maisie's Mystery Tour (1984)
4. Maisie Meets her Match (1984)
5. Maisie in London (1985)
6. Maisie and the Monster (1985)
7. Little Marco (1987)
8. Maisie goes to School (1988)
9. Maisie and the Space Invader (1988)
10. Maisie and the Posties (1988)
11. Maisie's Festival Adventure (1988)
12. Maisie Loves Paris (1989)
13. Maisie goes to Hospital (1989)
14. Maisie's Colouring Book (1990)
15. What Maisie did Next (1991)
16. Maisie in the Rainforest (1992)
17. Maisie and the Puffer (1992)
18. The Pigs of Puddledub (1992)
19. Maisie Digs up the Past (1994)
20. Maisie at the Edinburgh Book Festival (1994)
21. Maisie Goes to Hollywood (1994)
22. Maisie's Merry Christmas (1995)
23. Maisie's Second Colouring Book (1995)
24. Maisie's Fun and Games Activity Book (1996)
25. Children's Guide to Edinburgh [illustrated] (1997)
26. Maisie and the Pirates (1998)
27. Maisie's Millennium Calendar (1999)
28. Maisie Jumps into Japan (2000)
29. Maisie Bites the Big Apple (2002)
30. Maisie and the Abominable Snowcat (2004)
31. Maisie and the Botanic Garden Mystery (2006)
32. Maisie's Botanic Activity Book (2008)

Paterson also contributed to the following anthologies:

- Braw Stories (2005)
- Scottish Summer Schools (2007)
