= Lucy Cousins =

English author and illustrator

- Education: Royal College of Art
- Occupations: Children's book writer and illustrator
- Writing career
- Notable work: Maisy (book series)

Elizabeth "Lucy" Cousins (born on 10 February 1964) is a British author and illustrator of children's books. She is best known for her books featuring the character Maisy Mouse (referred to by Penguin Random House as the Maisy Series) published from the 1990s onwards, from which the TV series Maisy was created in 1999. A new animated adaptation My Friend Maisy is currently in the works and was slated to be released in 2025 but has since delayed to 2026.

== Early life and education ==
Cousins, whose parents were also artists, was interested in children's books from an early age. But it took until the end of six years in art college for her to decide that she wanted to create children's books. Cousins received BA Honours in graphic design from the Faculty of Arts and Architecture at Brighton Polytechnic. She then attended the Royal College of Art, where she met artist Quentin Blake, who encouraged her work. She developed her sense of design and colour at the Royal College of Art.

== Work ==
Cousins' books are aimed at preschool-aged children and younger or older.

Her work, especially the character of Maisy Mouse, is a successful publishing brand, with books printed in 27 different languages and over 27 million copies of her books in print.

Apart from the Maisy books, Cousins has also published other children's books, such as Jazzy in the Jungle (2002) and one about Noah's Ark.

== Recognition ==
Her board books, designed especially for toddlers, are considered among the best, according to Horn Book Magazine.

The Carnegie Library listed Maisy's First Colors as a 2013 pick for their Best Books for Babies list.

Cousins' character, Maisy, was featured on a postage stamp published by the U.S. Postal Service in their 2006 Favorite Children's Book Animals Series.

Cousins won a Booktrust Best Book Award in 2014 for Peck, Peck, Peck.

She received Mathical Honors for Count with Maisy, Cheep, Cheep, Cheep!.

== Bibliography ==
- Maisy Goes Swimming. Walker. 1990. ISBN 0-7445-0428-7.
- The Little Dog Laughed. Dutton. 1993. ISBN 978-0-525-44573-9.
- Noah's Ark. Candlewick Press. 1993. ISBN 978-1-56402-213-4.
- Maisy's ABC. Walker Books. 1994. ISBN 9780744532296.
- Za-Za's Baby Brother. Candlewick Press. 1995. ISBN 978-1-56402-582-1.
- Maisy's Bedtime. Candlewick Press. 1999. ISBN 978-0-7636-0884-2.
- Maisy Makes Gingerbread. Candlewick Press. 1999. ISBN 978-0-7636-2369-2.
- Maisy Dresses Up. Candlewick Press. 1999. ISBN 978-0-7636-0887-3.
- Maisy's Pool. Candlewick Press. 1999. ISBN 978-0-7636-0886-6.
- Count With Maisy. Candlewick Press. 1999. ISBN 978-0-7636-2369-2.
- Maisy Takes a Bath. Candlewick Press. 2000. ISBN 978-0-7636-1082-1.
- Maisy Drives the Bus. Candlewick Press. 2000. ISBN 978-0-7636-1083-8.
- Doctor Maisy. Candlewick Press. 2001. ISBN 978-0-7636-1612-0.
- Maisy Cleans Up. Candlewick Press. 2002. ISBN 978-0-7636-1711-0.
- Maisy Makes Lemonade. Candlewick Press. 2002. ISBN 978-0-7636-1728-8.
- Maisy Goes Camping. Candlewick Press. 2004. ISBN 978-0-7636-2369-2.
- Hooray for Fish!. Candlewick Press. 2005. ISBN 978-0-7636-2741-6.
- Maisy Goes to the Library: A Maisy First Experience Book. Candlewick Press. 2005. ISBN 978-0-7636-2669-3.
- Sweet Dreams, Maisy. Candlewick Press. 2005. ISBN 978-0-7636-2874-1.
- Maisy, Charley, and the Wobbly Tooth. Candlewick Press. 2006. ISBN 978-0-7636-2904-5.
- Maisy Goes to the Hospital. Candlewick Press. 2007. ISBN 978-0-329-82548-5.
- Maisy Big, Maisy Small. Candlewick Press. 2007. ISBN 978-0-7636-3406-3.
- Maisy Goes to the Museum. Candlewick Press. 2008. ISBN 978-0-7636-3838-2.
- Maisy's Animals/Los animales de Maisy. Candlewick Press. 2009. ISBN 978-0-7636-4517-5.
- Maisy's Clothes/La ropa de Maisy. Candlewick Press. 2009. ISBN 978-0-7636-4518-2.
- Maisy's Toys/Los juguetes de Maisy. Candlewick Press. 2009. ISBN 978-0-7636-4520-5.
- Maisy Goes to Preschool: A Maisy First Experiences Book. Candlewick Press. 2009. ISBN 978-0-7636-4254-9.
- Yummy: Eight Favorite Fairy Tales. Candlewick Press. 2009. ISBN 978-0-7636-4474-1.
- I'm the Best. Candlewick Press. 2010. ISBN 978-0-7636-4684-4.
- Maisy Goes on Vacation. Candlewick Press. 2010. ISBN 978-0-7636-4752-0.
- Maisy Goes to the City. Candlewick Press. 2011. ISBN 978-0-7636-5327-9.
- Create With Maisy. Candlewick Press. 2012. ISBN 978-0-7636-6122-9.
- Maisy Goes On a Sleepover. Candlewick Press. 2012. ISBN 978-0-7636-5883-0.
- Maisy Learns to Swim. Candlewick Press. 2013. ISBN 978-0-7636-6480-0.
- Maisy's First Numbers. Candlewick Press. 2013. ISBN 978-0-7636-6805-1.
- Peck, Peck, Peck. Candlewick Press. 2013. ISBN 978-0-7636-6621-7.
- Maisy Plays Soccer. Candlewick Press. 2014. ISBN 978-0-7636-7238-6.
- Maisy Goes to the Movies. Candlewick Press. 2014. ISBN 978-0-7636-6950-8.
- Hooray for Birds!. Walker Books Ltd. 2017. ISBN 978-1-4063-8061-3.
- Maisy's Town: A First Words Book. Candlewick Press. 2022. ISBN 978-1-5362-2443-6.
