= Maisie MacKenzie =

Title cat character in a book series by Aileen Paterson

Maisie MacKenzie is the title character, a cat, in a series of books by Aileen Paterson.

Maisie first appeared in Maisie Comes to Morningside in 1984 and has since appeared in the animated television series Meeow!. In 2011 Lothian Buses made Maisie the face of the Number 5 bus which goes through the character's home district of Morningside.
