= Mazie Gordon-Phillips =

- Born: Mazie Phillips; March 3, 1896; Boston, MA
- Died: June 8, 1964
- Other names: Queen of The Bowery
- Occupation: Movie Theater Owner
- Known for: Homeless Advocacy

Mazie Gordon-Phillips (10 March 1896 – 8 June 1964) also known as "Queen of The Bowery" and "Saint Mazie", was a movie theater owner and advocate for people experiencing homelessness on the Bowery, New York City.

== Biography ==
Gordon-Phillips grew up in Boston, Massachusetts and moved to New York City at the age of 10 to live with her sister Rosie. Gordon-Phillips and her sisters Rosie and Jeanie owned the Venice Theater on Park Row from the 1920s to the 1940s; Gordon-Phillips was the manager. After the theater closed each night, she visited homeless men on the streets, distributing money and toiletries and assisting them to find a place to sleep in homeless shelters.

In 1940, a New Yorker journalist Joseph Mitchell wrote a profile of Gordon-Phillips and coined the name "Saint Mazie".
