= Richard Tipping =

Australian poet and artist

- Born: 1949 (age 76–77); Adelaide, Australia
- Citizenship: Australia
- Education: Flinders University, University of Technology Sydney
- Occupations: Poet, artist
- Website: www.richardtipping.com

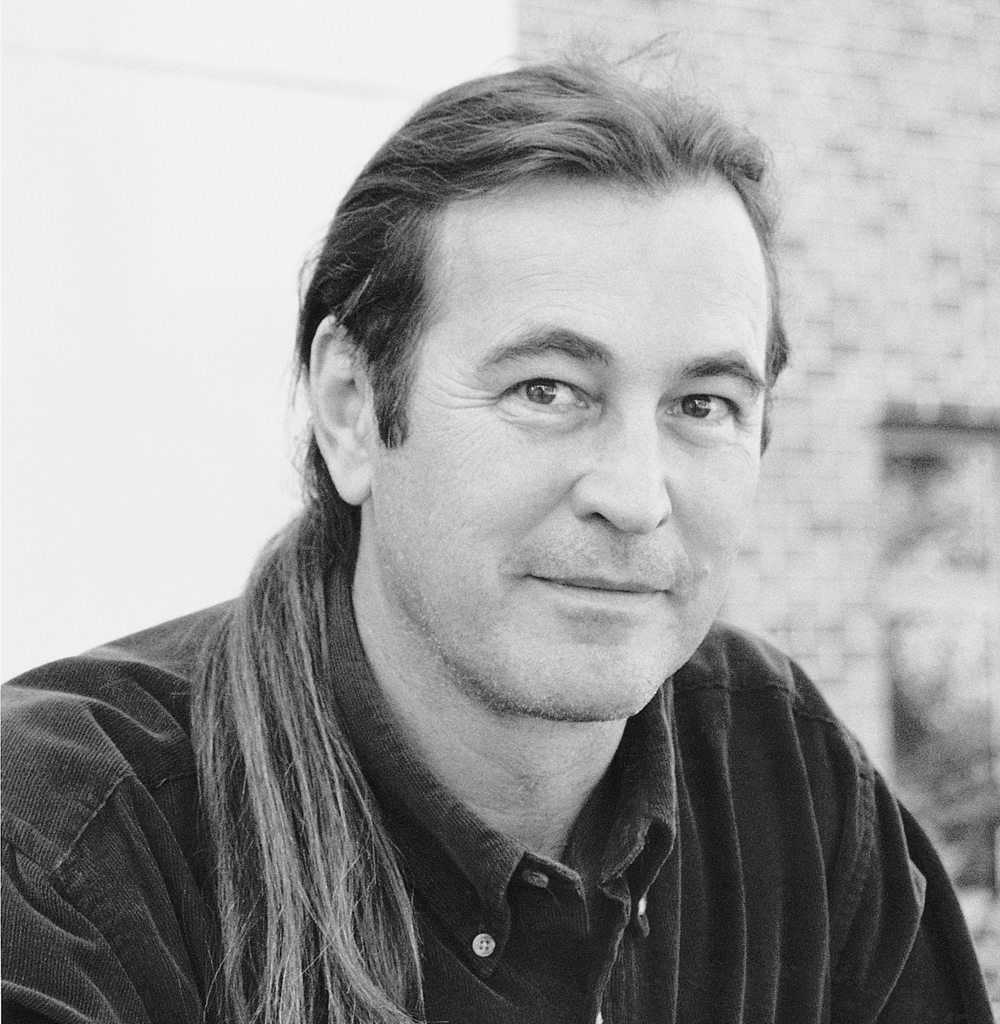

Richard Kelly Tipping (born 1949) is an Australian poet and artist best known for his visual poetry, word art, and large-scale public artworks. Examples of his work are held in major collections in Australia and abroad.

== Early life and education ==
Tipping was born into a medical family in Adelaide, South Australia, in 1949. His father Michael Tipping served in the RAAF flying in Beaufighter aircraft in WW2 and became a dermatologist. His mother Barbara Kelly was a social worker specialising in multiple sclerosis and breast cancer. He matriculated from St Peter's College in Adelaide in 1966, and tried a year at law school at the University of Adelaide before studying film, philosophy and literature at Flinders University, graduating in 1972.

After an MA, in 2007 Tipping completed his doctorate at the University of Technology Sydney (UTS) with an exegesis titled Word Art Works: visual poetry and textual objects.

== Career ==
Following undergraduate study, Tipping spent a year in Sydney in 1973, which included exhibiting with Aleks Danko at Watters Gallery. He then travelled in 1974 to the United States and lived in San Francisco, meeting with poets including Michael McClure and Robert Duncan, and visiting Mexico and Guatemala. He returned to Adelaide in 1975 and began work with the South Australian Film Corporation as a researcher until 1978.

Tipping's career began with free verse poetry, and soon included composing typographic concrete poetry on a manual typewriter, exploring the arrangement of letters on the page as a field of poetic composition. Literary concern is integral to his practice in word art and visual poetry.

In 1975 Tipping co-founded the ongoing Friendly Street Poets, which began open-mic poetry readings in Adelaide, and edited their first anthology, Friendly Street Poetry Reader, in 1977.

His first solo exhibitions were at the Adelaide Festival Centre in 1978, at Robin Gibson Gallery in Sydney in 1980, and at Roslyn Oxley9 Gallery in Sydney] in 1983.

From 1979 he began living with artist Mazie Turner (Mazie Karen Turner) and over the next decades they had three children together: Kai, Jasper and Grace. Their careers were separate but parallel, and Turner achieved recognition with large-scale blueprints on cloth in the 1980s, and later with abstract paintings.

Between 1984 and 1986 he lived in Europe and England with his family, while making documentaries about expatriate writers such as Randolph Stow in Sussex, Peter Porter in London, Jack Lindsay in Cambridge, and David Malouf in Tuscany. The Stow film was shown on ABC Television in Australia, and others released on VHS tape through the Australian Film Institute.

He lectured in communication and media arts at the University of Newcastle, NSW between 1989 and 2010.

Tipping's career has a timespan of over fifty years, working in both spoken and graphic poetry and in visual art in many media and scales.

In 2021 he opened an art gallery WordXimage in Maitland, NSW specialising in text-picture relationships.

== Art ==
Tipping is known for his visual poetry and word art, including artsigns, textual sculpture, subvertising graphics, and large-scale public artworks both permanent and temporary.

Tipping's public sculptures are illustrated and described in his book Hear the Art: visual poetry as sculpture, Puncher and Wattman 2022.

In the late 1970s and early 1980s Tipping collected ironies and oddities in public signage through photography. Signs of Australia published by Penguin Books in 1982 collected many of these found sign anomalies. In 1979 Tipping began changing public signs to make poetic messages. Signature works from his explorations of public sign language include No Understanding in the collection of the National Gallery of Australia. His public art projects include the well known Watermark (2000) steel sculpture (popularly known as "Flood") on the Brisbane River, which became the high-water mark for a major flood in 2011.

He has had more than 30 solo exhibitions in Australia as well as in New York, London, Munich, Cologne and Berlin.

== Collections ==
Examples of his artwork are held in depth in the collections of the Art Gallery of New South Wales, the British Museum., the National Gallery of Australia, Canberra; and Heide Museum of Modern Art.

Tipping is represented in other major art collections including the Museum of Modern Art, New York; The National Gallery of Victoria; Art Gallery of South Australia; Queensland Art Gallery, Tasmanian Museum and Art Gallery, the Museum and Art Gallery of the Northern Territory; the Powerhouse Museum, Sydney; the Museum of Contemporary Art, Sydney; and the Brisbane Powerhouse. Many regional Australian art galleries as well as key public and university libraries also hold his work.

== Recognition ==
A PhD thesis by Sabrina Caldwell completed at the Australian National University in 2008, titled The Politics of Imagination: Richard Kelly Tipping and the Art and Technology of Words, Images and Objects, is available to download as a document.

Tipping was awarded various grants by the Australia Council (now known as Creative Australia), starting with a Young Writer's Grant from the Literature Board in 1973. In 1984 he and Mazie Turner co-won a Dyason Bequest from the Art Gallery of New South to help fund a residency in Italy through the Visual Arts Board.

Articles about his art can be found in Art Almanac, Look magazine of the Art Gallery of New South Wales, Art Guide, and Limelight

== Poetry ==
As a poet he published three books of poems with University of Queensland Press. These were available on Poetry Library, but that site is currently off-line thanks to the ineptitude and insouciance of the University of Sydney. More recent poetry collections are Tommy Ruff (2014) and Instant History (2017)

His poems are represented in many anthologies, including the Penguin Book of Modern Australian Poetry edited by Les Murray, the New Oxford Book of Australian Verse edited by Philip Meade and John Tranter, and the Penguin Anthology of Australian Poetry edited by John Kinsella.

As editor

- The Word as Art special issue of Artlink (Vol 27 No.1, 2007),
- The Friendly Street Poetry Reader, 1st issue (Adelaide University Press, 1977)
- Mok: A Magazine of Contemporary Dissolution and Intemperance (5 issues 1968–1969, co-editor) – the first of a wave of small magazines in late 1960s defining a shift in Australian poetry which became known as "The Generation of 68".

== Film ==
In the 1980s Tipping made documentary films on writers including David Malouf, Randolph Stow, Peter Porter, Roland Robinson and Les Murray.

== Works ==
Books

- Hear the Art: visual poetry as sculpture, Puncher & Wattman, 2022
- Instant History, poems, (Flying Island Books, Macau, 2017)
- Tommy Ruff, poems, (PressPress, Berry, NSW, 2014)
- Off the Page and Back Again, visual poems and sculptures, (Writers Forum, London, 2010)
- Subvert I Sing, visual poems and graphics, (Red Fox Press, Ireland, 2008)
- Notes towards Employment, poetry, (Picaro Press, Warners Bay NSW, 2006)
- Five O'Clock Shadows, poetry, (Thorny Devil Press, Newcastle, 1989)
- Nearer by Far, poetry, (University of Queensland Press, 1986)
- Headlines to the Heart, poetry with drawings by Maize Turner, (Pothole Press, London, 1985)
- Diverse Voice, visual poetry, (The International Poetry Archive, Oxford, 1985)
- Signs of Australia, photographs, (Penguin Books Australia, 1982)
- Domestic Hardcore, poetry, (University of Queensland Press, 1975)
- Soft Riots, poetry, (University of Queensland Press, 1972)

Print Folios

- Lovepoems, 20 screenprints in a folio, (Thorny Devil Press, Newcastle, 2007)
- The Sydney Morning 1-IV, 50 prints in four folios, (Thorny Devil Press, Newcastle, 1989–1994)
- Word Works, 10 large screenprints, (Adelaide, 1979)

Catalogues

- Art Word (Latrobe Regional Art Gallery, Morwell, Victoria
- Instant History (Australian Galleries, Sydney, 2017)
- Only Emotion Endures (Australian Galleries, Sydney, 2008)
- Multiple Choice (Lake Macquarie City Art Gallery, NSW, 2007)
- Roadsigned, postcard pack, (National Gallery of Australia, Canberra, 2005)
- Public Works (Greenaway Art Gallery, Adelaide, 2002)
- City Rubbings (Conny Dietzschold Gallery, Sydney and Cologne, 2002)
- Hear the Art (The Eagle Gallery, London, 1997)
- Multiple Pleasures (Art Gallery of New South Wales, Sydney, 1996)
- Word Works 2 (Powell Street Gallery, Melbourne, 1980)
- Word Works (Robin Gibson Gallery, Sydney, 1980)

Solo exhibitions

- Cosmic Seed (Australian Galleries, Sydney, 2022)
- Art Word (Latrobe Regional Art Gallery, Morwell, Victoria)
- Instant History (Australian Galleries, Sydney, 2017)
- Studio (Australian Galleries, Sydney, 2012)
- Hearth (Australian Galleries, Melbourne, 2009)
- Only Emotion Endures (Australian Galleries, Sydney, 2008)
- Subvert I Sing (Multiple Box Sydney, 2008)
- Multiple Choice (Lake Macquarie City Art Gallery, NSW, 2007)
- Fresh Concrete (John Miller Gallery, Newcastle, 2007)
- Imagine Silence (Greenaway Art Gallery, Adelaide, 2007)
- Errrorism, (Multiple Box Sydney, 2004)
- Art Signs and Word Sculptures (Banning + Low, Washington DC, 2004)
- Exit Strategy (The Studio, Sydney Opera House, 2004)
- Street Talk (Banning Gallery, New York, 2003)
- Public Works (Greenaway Art Gallery, Adelaide, 2002)
- One Two Many (Multiple Box Sydney, 2001)
- Versions: Perversions, Subversions and Verse (Ubu Gallery, New York, 1998)
- Hear the Art (The Eagle Gallery, London, 1997)
- Multiple Pleasures (Art Gallery of New South Wales, Sydney, 1996)
- Art Allergy with Alex Selenitsch, (Rhumbarellas Gallery, Melbourne, 1994)
- Between the Lines (United Artists Gallery, Melbourne, 1984)
- Fast Art (Garry Anderson Gallery, Sydney, 1983)
- Ideagraphics (Rosyln Oxley Gallery, Sydney, 1983)
- Inside Outside (Ray Hughes Gallery, Brisbane, 1981)
- Word Works 2 (Powell Street Gallery, Melbourne, 1980)
- Word Works (Robin Gibson Gallery, Sydney, 1980)
- The Everlasting Stone (Adelaide Festival Centre Gallery, 1978)
- Soft Riots with Aleks Danko, (Watters Gallery, Sydney, 1973)
- Uck with Aleks Danko, (Llewellyn Gallery, Adelaide, 1970)

Group exhibitions More than 50 appearances in group exhibitions since 1975 including:

- Legacies of Marcel Duchamp, Art Gallery of New South Wales, 2019, including an artist talk (see links in this reference)
- Sculpture by the Sea Bondi, 2022, 2016 (also 1998, 1999, 2003, 2005, 2006, 2011, 2013, 2014, 2015)
- The Silent Scream (Monash University, 2011)
- Avoiding Myth and Message: Australian Artists and the Literary World (Museum of Contemporary Art, Sydney, 2009)
- Mapping Correspondence: Mail Art in the 21st Century (Center for Books Arts, New York, 2008)
- Multiplicity: Print and Multiples (Museum of Contemporary Art, Sydney, 2006)
- The National Sculpture Prize and Exhibition (National Gallery of Australia, Canberra, 2003)

Film and video

- Documentary portraits of Australian writers including Roland Robinson, Les Murray, Peter Porter, Randolph Stowe, David Malouf, and Sumner Locke-Elliott (1984–86), commissioned by the Australia Council'sArchival Film Programme. These will be freely available on-line through the National Film and Sound Archive in 2025.
- Documentary portraits of artists who make books including: Bob Cobbing (UK), Ronald King (UK), Warren Lehrer (US), Ed Ruscha (US), Christo and Jeanne-Claude (US), Purgatory Pie Press (US) and other in progress (1994–present).
