= Newington, Edinburgh =

Area of Edinburgh, Scotland

Coordinates: 55.9372°N 3.1782°W

Newington
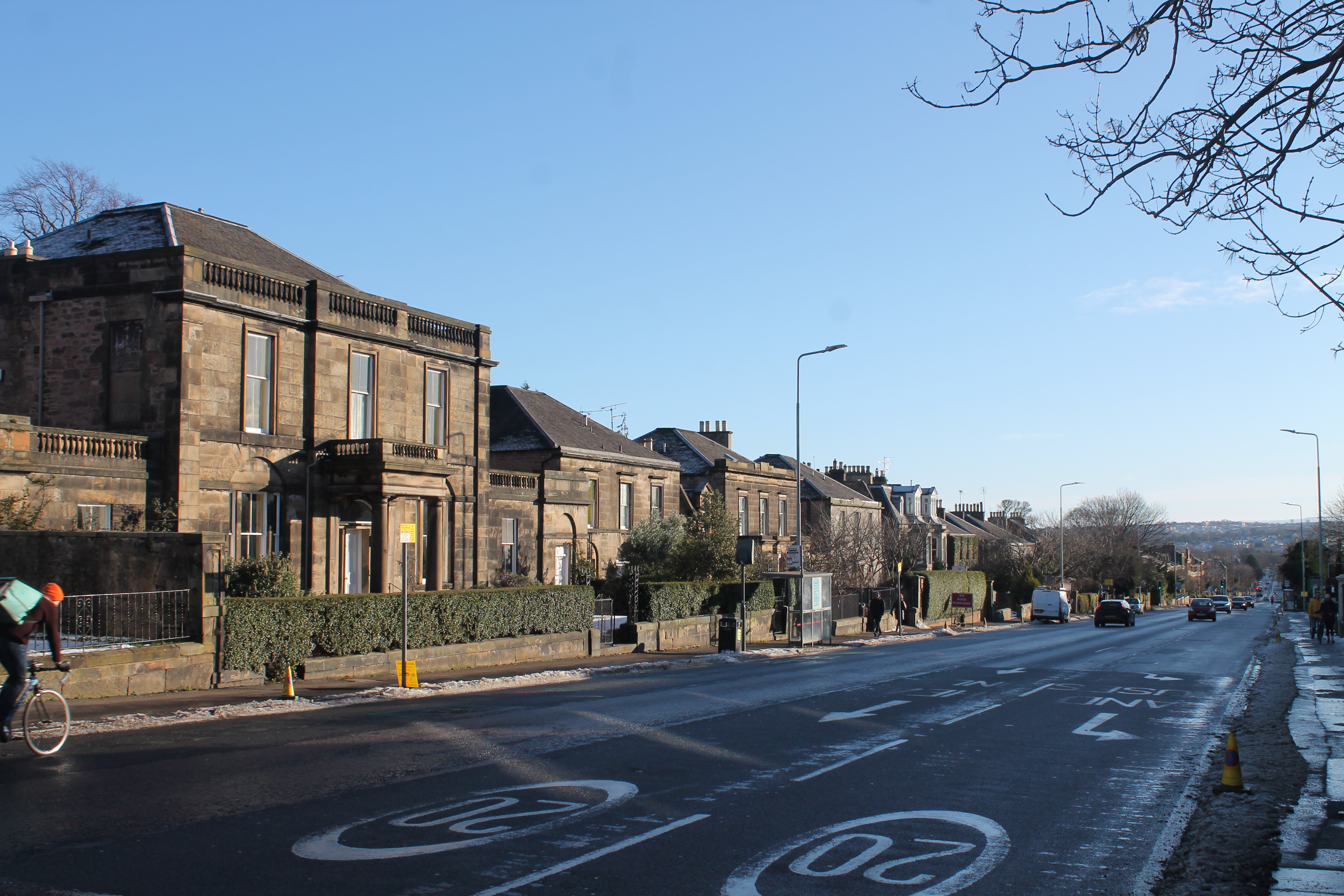
- Minto Street, looking south

- Location within the City of Edinburgh council area Location within Scotland
- Population: 11,130
- Council area: City of Edinburgh
- Lieutenancy area: Edinburgh
- Country: Scotland
- Sovereign state: United Kingdom
- Post town: EDINBURGH
- Postcode district: EH8, EH9
- Dialling code: 0131
- Police: Scotland
- Fire: Scottish
- Ambulance: Scottish
- UK Parliament: Edinburgh East and Musselburgh, Edinburgh South
- Scottish Parliament: Edinburgh Central, Edinburgh Southern

Newington is a neighbourhood of southern Edinburgh, Scotland. Developed from the early 19th century, it is an affluent, predominantly residential area.

Located between 1 and 2 1/2 miles (1.5 and 4 kilometres) south of Edinburgh city centre, Newington is bounded to the east by St Leonard's and Prestonfield; to the south by Cameron Toll and Nether Liberton; to the west by Blackford, the Grange, and Sciennes; and to the north by the Southside, Edinburgh. Historically part of the parishes of St Cuthbert's and Liberton in the county of Midlothian, Newington was incorporated into the city of Edinburgh between 1832 and 1896.

Originally part of the ancient forest of Drumselch, the lands of Newington were feued by the town council of Edinburgh from 1586. Aside from small developments, the area was predominantly rural until Benjamin Bell purchased the lands in 1805 and began to develop them as a suburb. Around this time, the construction of a new route from Edinburgh's New Town to Liberton via Newington was accelerating the southward development of the city. From the 1850s, bus services connected Newington to the city centre while trams arrived in 1871. Newington station opened to passengers in 1884. By this time, the area was almost entirely developed. In the latter half of the 19th century, institutions including the Longmore Hospital, the Royal Blind Asylum, and St Margaret's School set up in Newington. Newington station closed to passengers in 1962.

Northern Newington consists of dense early Victorian tenements and Georgian terraces. South of Salisbury Road, these give way to sparser, late Georgian and early Victorian developments, some of which were founded as gated communities. Southern Newington includes Victorian villas and terraces as well as some former industrial buildings.

With a population of around 11,000, Newington today remains an affluent, primarily residential suburb. (Note: The census data zones mostly covering Newington are Newington and Dalkeith Road – 01, 02, 03, 05; Meadows and Southside – 03, 04, 05; Blackford, West Mains, and Mayfield – 07, 08; and Grange – 01) The area is also one of the most diverse in Edinburgh. Newington houses Edinburgh's only synagogue as well as the headquarters of Historic Environment Scotland and the Causewayside site of the National Library of Scotland.

== Toponymy ==
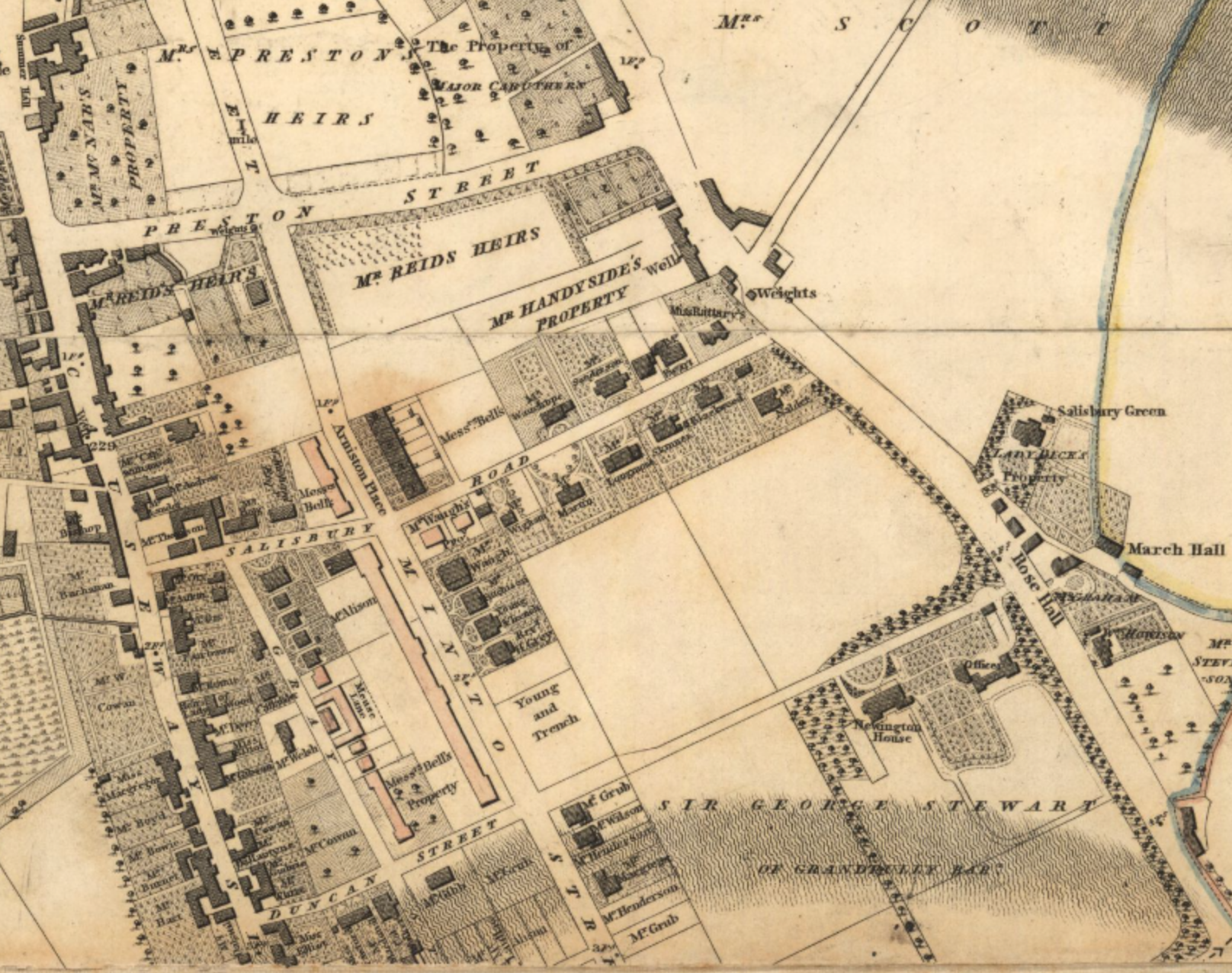
Northern Newington from Robert Kirkwood's map of 1817

Newington is likely a variant of "Newton", meaning "new farm" in Scots. The name may have been invented by Alexander or Mariota Slowman or by their daughter, Margaret. Between them, the Slowmans acquired five of the six lots feued at Newington between 1602 and 1628. Alexander Ellis purchased these lots in 1649 and afterwards styled himself "Alexander Ellis of Newington".

Alternatively, the name derives from "New town meadow" in reference to Edinburgh's role in the 16th-century feuing scheme. The "ing" here represents a meadow.

Late 18th and early 19th-century property records often refer to the area of Newington as "Belleville". The origin of this title is obscure but may be related to an alternative name for the mansion of Clockmiln (or Clockmill) near Holyroodhouse. The name has long since fallen out of use, being maintained only in the name of a mansion on Blacket Avenue.

== History ==
=== Early years ===
Until the 16th century, the area now occupied by Newington lay within the ancient forest of Drumselch. The only interruptions to the forest were the nearby Grange of St Giles, developed from the 12th century, and the two southern highways via Liberton and Dalkeith respectively. What is now East and West Preston Street connected these two roads. This was known as "Mounthooly Loan" either in reference to a now-lost chapel at its eastern end in St Leonard's or, via Old Norse, to a "ridged house of the dead": an ancient burial site somewhere in its vicinity. The area was otherwise unnamed save for Lowsie Law, which was likely located near modern South Oxford Street. A minor skirmish of the Marian civil war was fought here in 1571.

In 1586, the town council feued six lots on an uncultivated area of the Burgh Muir bounded by what are today East and West Preston street in the north, Dalkeith Road in the east, East and West Mayfield in the south, and Causewayside in the west. At the same time, the Dalkeith and Liberton roads were widened and the latter metalled or "causeyed", giving it the name "Causewayside". The area remained open countryside until the end of the 18th century. During the 17th and 18th centuries, Mounthooly Loan was known as "Gibbet Loan" for the gallows which stood where Preston Street Primary School is now. Under these gallows, James Graham, 1st Marquess of Montrose was buried until his reinterment at St Giles' in 1661.

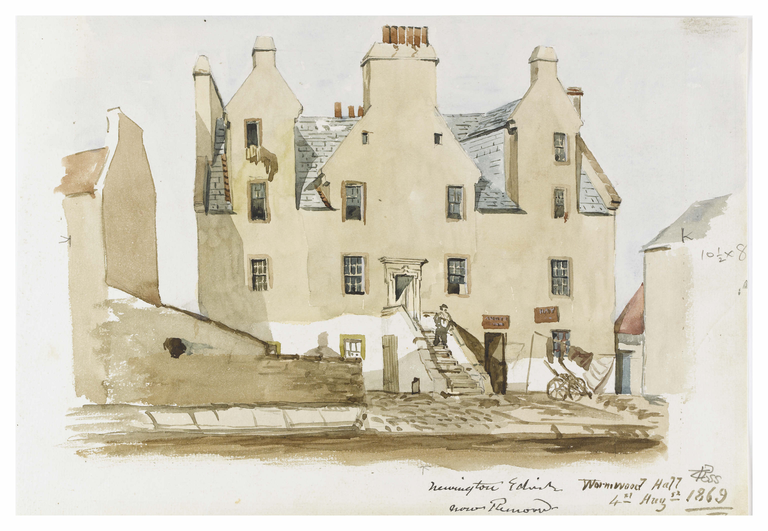
Wormwoodhall and Broadstairs House in 1869

The modern bounds of Newington contained some smaller development prior to the end of the 18th century. The farmlands of Mayfield, earlier known as Newlands, centred on Mayfield House on Mayfield Loan. This land had first been feued out of the Burgh Muir in 1530. Prior to 1800, there were also cottages at Echo Bank on Dalkeith Road and at the Powburn near Mayfield Road. There was also development along Causewayside, including a house whose two sections were known as Broadstairs House and Wormwoodhall. This stood on a site between Salisbury Place and Duncan Street until its demolition in 1880. James Grant attributes the house to a doctor of James IV or V, in whose family, Grant claims, the house remained until the end of the 18th century, after which it became slums. Summerhall was feued in 1705 and a brewery is recorded there as early as 1739.

=== 18th and early 19th centuries ===
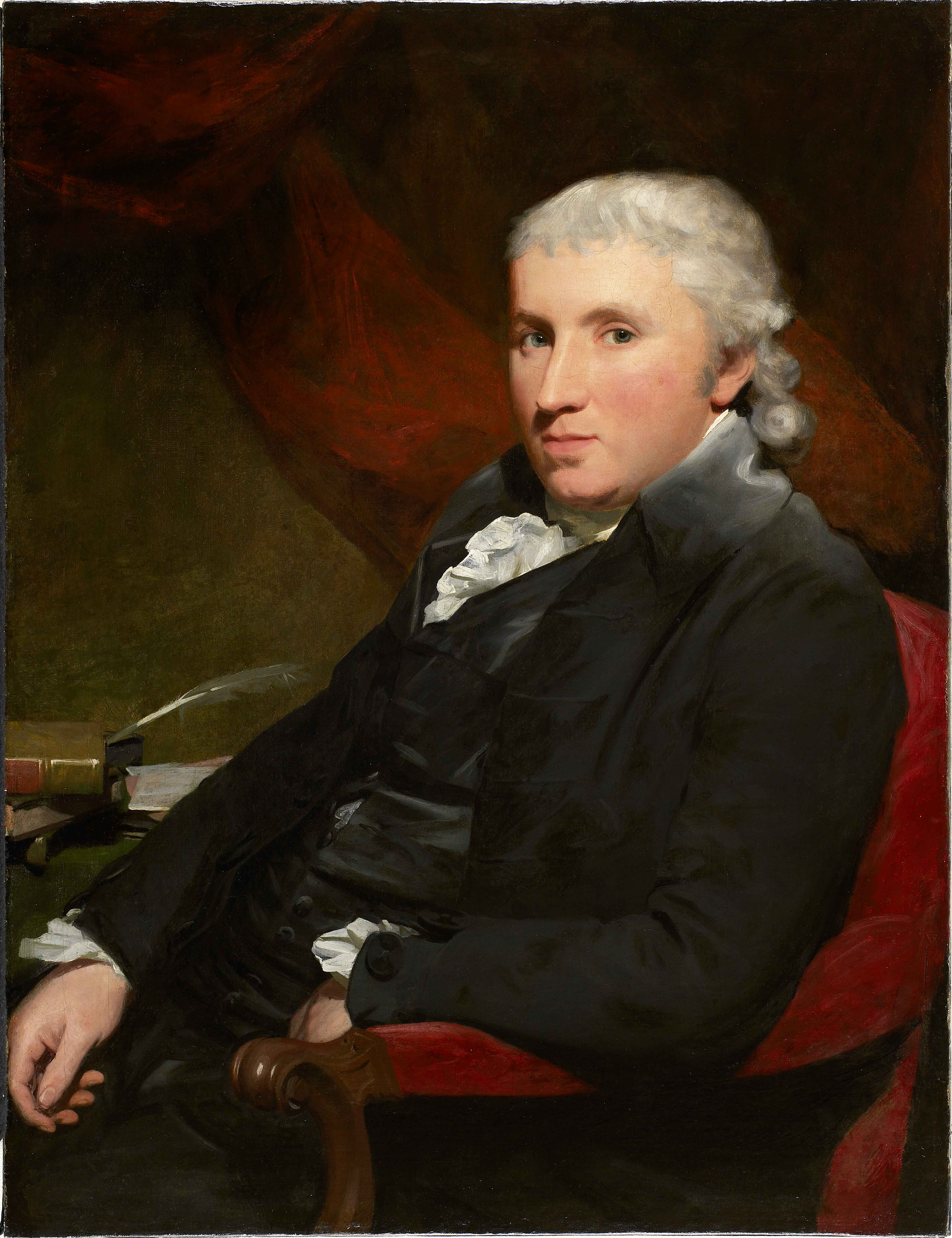
Benjamin Bell, who purchased the entire Newington estate in 1805 and constructed Newington House

From the mid-18th century, developments such as George Square and Nicolson Street had brought wealthy Edinburgh citizens out of the Old Town and into the Southside. Further development south, however, was stalled by the opening of the North Bridge in 1772, which aided the northward development of the city into the New Town. From 1788, southward development resumed with the building of the South Bridge, which connected Nicolson Street to the Old Town. In 1794, an act of Parliament prepared for a great road south through Newington, continuing in the line of Nicolson Street. Minto Street had been planned as part of this by 1795; in 1812, the street was connected to the Liberton and Gilmerton roads. By the turn of the 19th century, many inhabitants of the New Town had developed houses in Newington either as country residences or as more secluded successors to their residences in the dense northern suburb.

In 1805, the entire Newington estate was bought by the surgeon Benjamin Bell, who was assisted in his business dealings by his fellow surgeon Alexander Wood. The same year, Bell built Newington House amid eight acres of land; the house was accessed from Blacket Avenue, which was named for Bell's familial estates in Middlebie, Dumfriesshire. After Bell's death in 1806, Sir George Stewart of Grandtully bought the house and estate in 1808. Stewart constructed gates and lodges at either end of Blacket Avenue and Mayfield Terrace. The gates were closed at dusk every evening. The Kirkwood map of 1817 shows that, by this date, most present-day streets in this area had been laid out and named. By the end of the 1830s, the northern part of Blacket Place had been developed with detached and semi-detached properties while villas had been constructed in Upper Gray Street near terraces in Middleby Street and Duncan Street.

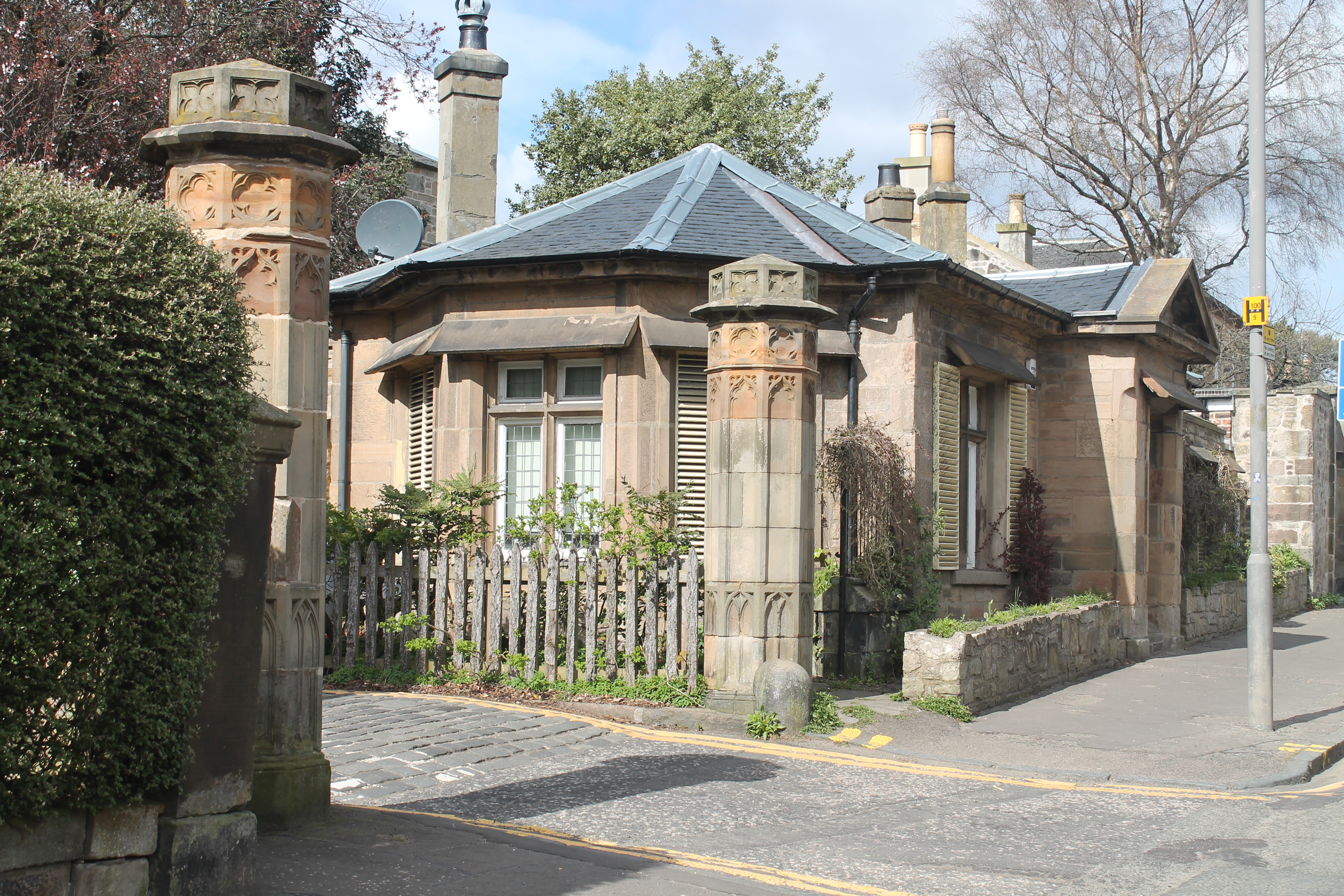
The lodge and gateposts at the Dalkeith Road end of Blacket Avenue

The development of Newington and the Southside in this period occasioned the construction in 1823 of the Hope Park Chapel as a chapel of ease of the West Kirk. In 1859, the chapel became a parish quoad sacra with the name Newington Parish Church. The congregation established a school on Dalkeith Road, opposite the end of Holyrood Park Road. Around the time of the chapel's establishment, the burial ground the Buccleuch Chapel had become overcrowded and the West Kirk parish established a new burial ground at East Preston Street in 1820.

On 12 February 1829, a week after the execution of William Hare, a mob from Edinburgh surrounded the house of Robert Knox on Newington Road. Burke and his accomplice William Hare had supplied corpses to Knox. The mob burned an effigy of the anatomist, who escaped in the guise of a Highlander.

=== Victorian era ===
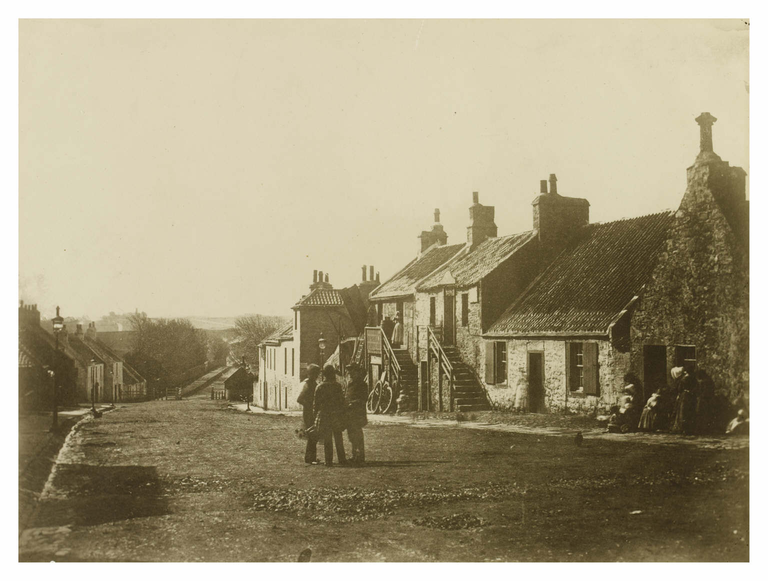
Working class housing on Causewayside in 1854

Development in Newington slowed between 1830 and 1850 but soon after resumed at pace. In this period, properties in the southern part of Blacket Place and the villas of Mayfield Terrace were developed. By 1865, a report by Henry Littlejohn found Newington to be the most densely populated of Edinburgh's southern suburbs. In the expanding suburb, burials were accommodated by the establishment of Newington Cemetery, which opened for interments in 1846. After Warriston Cemetery, Newington, which was laid out by David Cousin from 1848, was the second of Edinburgh's privately managed suburban cemeteries.

Causewayside, in particular, had, from 1850, become overcrowded and unruly. Barriers were erected in Duncan Street and Salisbury Place to prevent the district's inhabitants from accessing the wealthier residences of Minto Street. Newington Parish Church supported a missionary in this area from 1866 and permanent mission buildings were established on Causewayside in 1886. In these, the Newington Social Union was established in 1892.

Improved transport links to the city aided Newington's rapid development in this period. Buses reached the area in the 1850s and tramcars in 1871. Newington Railway Station on the Edinburgh Suburban and Southside Junction Railway opened in 1884.

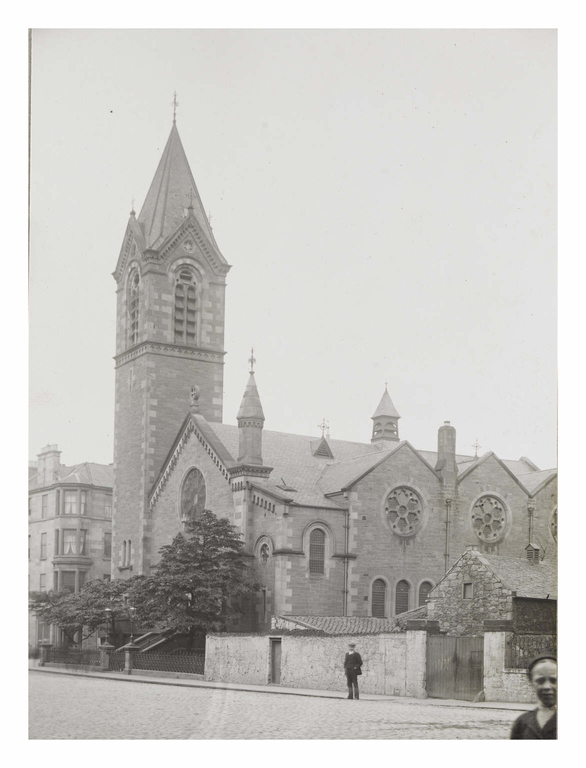
Hope Park United Presbyterian Church, founded in 1867 and demolished in 1949. Two United Presbyterian churches, three Free churches, and one established church were founded in Newington in the 19th century. Baptist, Congregationalist, Episcopal, and Roman Catholic churches were also established.

The disruption of 1843 saw the establishment of a Free Church congregation on Newington Road. A United Presbyterian congregation from Potterrow moved to a new church on the corner of Hope Park Terrace and Causewayside in 1867 while the Congregationalists established a church nearby at Hope Park Terrace in 1876. The Free Church went on to establish a congregation at Mayfield in 1875 while a Free congregation from Chambers Street moved to new buildings on Suffolk Road in 1898 under the name Craigmillar Park Free. The Church of Scotland established a mission under the name of Mayfield on Craigmillar Park in 1879. St Peter's, an Episcopal church, was built on Lutton Place between 1857 and 1865 while St Columba's Roman Catholic Church was established on Upper Gray Street in 1889. Nearby, on Duncan Street, a Baptist church had opened in 1841. In 1847, the church was purchased by the United Presbyterians, who moved out in 1863 to the newly opened Grange Road United Presbyterian Church on the corner of Causewayside and Grange Road in Sciennes. After this, the Duncan Street church was again occupied by a Baptist congregation.

After Sir George Stewart's death in 1822, Newington House had passed through a number of owners until its occupation in 1852 by Liberal politician, Duncan McLaren. At the western edge of Newington, McLaren acquired the lands of Mayfield and Rosebank along with the village of Powburn. From 1862, the area around Waverley Park was feued to a plan by David Cousin. In 1864, Cousin radically revised this scheme to create a plan of curving streets centring on a communally-owned green space at Waverley Park. This may have been inspired by a similar scheme at London's Ladbroke Grove. Cousin also proposed that, like the Blacket development to its north, entry to this scheme would be guarded by gates and lodges. Lodges remain at the Dalkeith Road entrance to Queen's Crescent and on Peel Terrace.

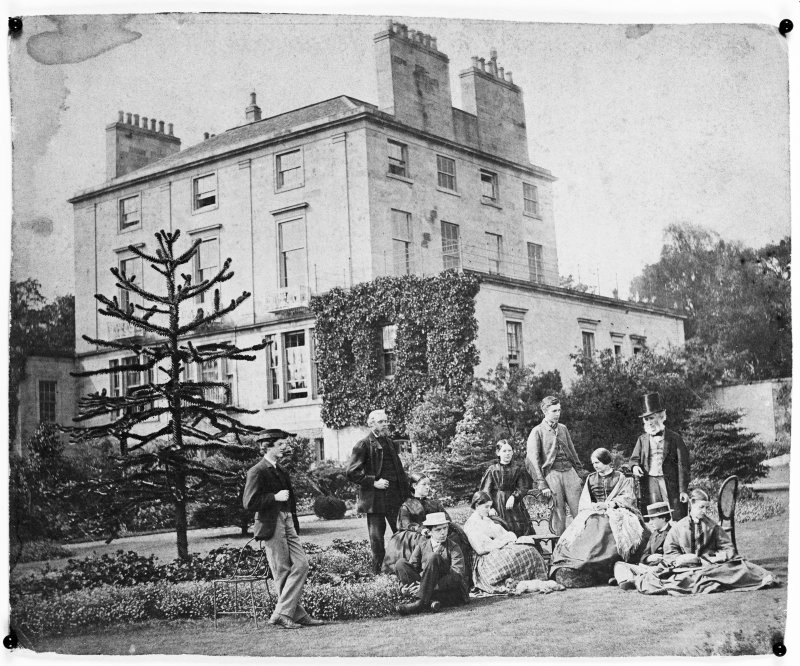
Duncan McLaren and his family outside Newington House around 1880

After McLaren acquired the Mayfield estate in 1863, he again commissioned Cousin to produce a feu plan; however, only two terraces on the east side of Mayfield Gardens were laid out to Cousin's plan. Nevertheless, the area had been developed almost entirely by the time of McLaren's death in 1886. McLaren's personality and politics are reflected in the names of the streets he developed: Cobden Road, Peel Terrace, and Bright's Crescent are named for fellow reformist politicians; Queen's Terrace for his loyalty to Queen Victoria; Waverely Park for his love of literature; and Mentone and Ventnor terraces for his favourite holiday resorts.

Encouraged by the success of McLaren's Mayfield scheme, Sir Robert Gordon-Gilmour feued the area to its south as East and West Craigmillar Park, beginning in 1876. Development was, however, slower and the remaining unfeued land was turned into a nine-hole golf course in 1895. After one of its fairways was developed for housing in 1904, the club moved to Blackford and the remaining area became sport fields. In the same year, Craigmillar Park Bowling Club opened on vacant space in West Craigmillar Park. The creation of these sporting facilities supplemented the Waverely Lawn Tennis and Squash Club, which had been founded in 1885.

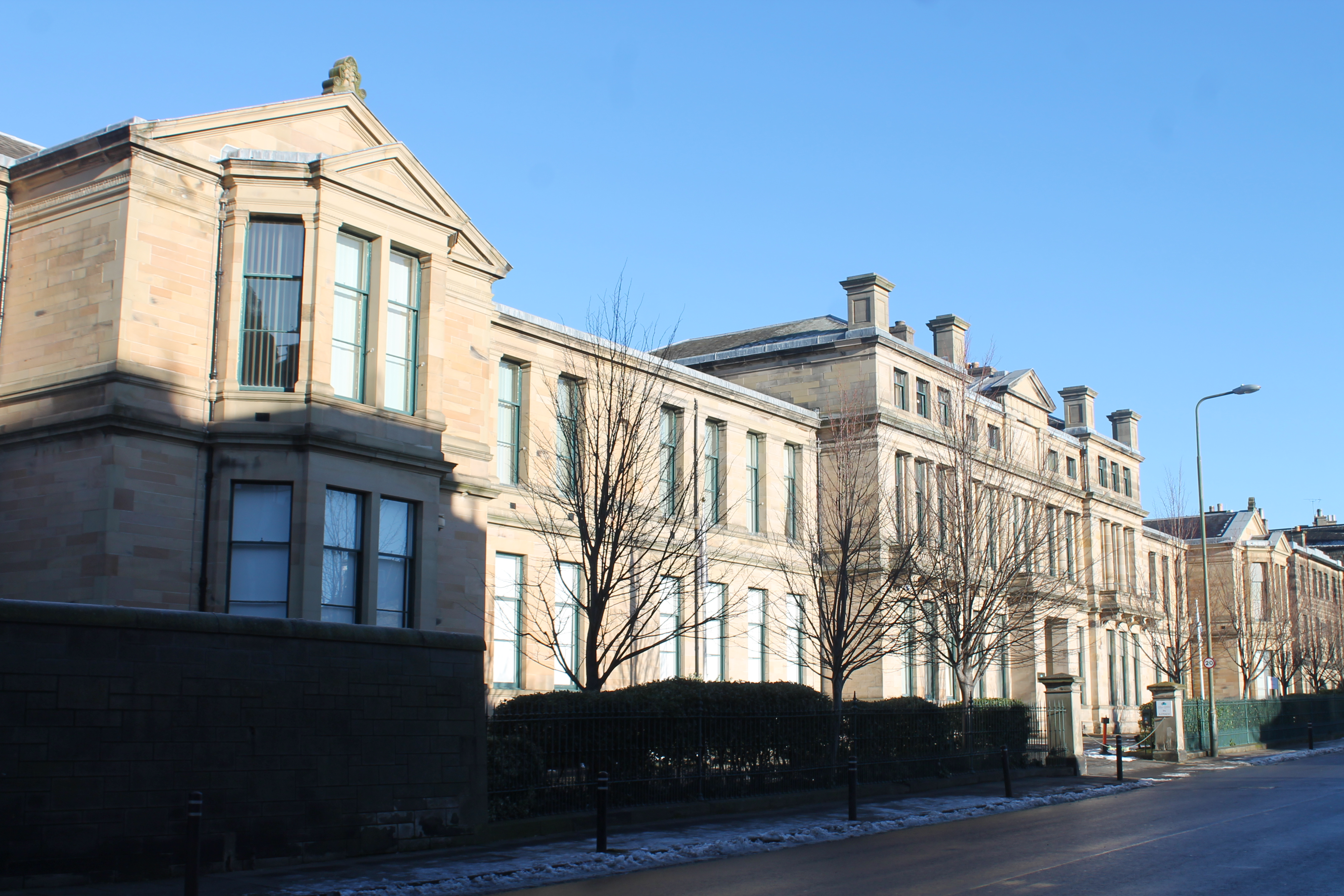
Longmore Hospital on Salisbury Place, opened as the Edinburgh Hospital for Incurables in 1875

The 19th century saw the establishment in Newington of several health and educational institutions. Completed in 1877 on the site of the old settlement at the Powburn, the West Craigmillar Asylum for Blind Females superseded the blind asylum on Nicolson Street. In 1875, Longmore Hospital on Salisbury Place opened as the Edinburgh Hospital for Incurables. Founded by a bequest of John Alexander Longmore, the hospital occupied the former site of several houses and a boys' school known as Wilson's Academy. Other schools of this period in Newington included Munro's Academy and Robertson's Academy, which occupied a Gothic building on the site of what is now South Oxford Street. St Margaret's School was founded in Craigmillar Park in 1890 as Queen Margaret's College for Young Ladies. Also in 1890, Madame Muriset's Craigmillar Park College was established on Crawfurd Road as a girls' boarding school. It closed at Muriset's retirement in 1932, by which time it was also accepting boys. By 1896, the need for a new public school in Newington and the Southside was recognised by the foundation of Preston Street School on the corner of East Preston Street and Dalkeith Road. It opened in 1897 and remains in use as a primary school. St Columba's Roman Catholic Church had opened an attached school the previous year on Strathearn Road in Marchmont. In 1897, this moved to Newington Road, moving again to the former Causewayside School building in 1924. It closed in 1941.

=== 20th and 21st centuries ===
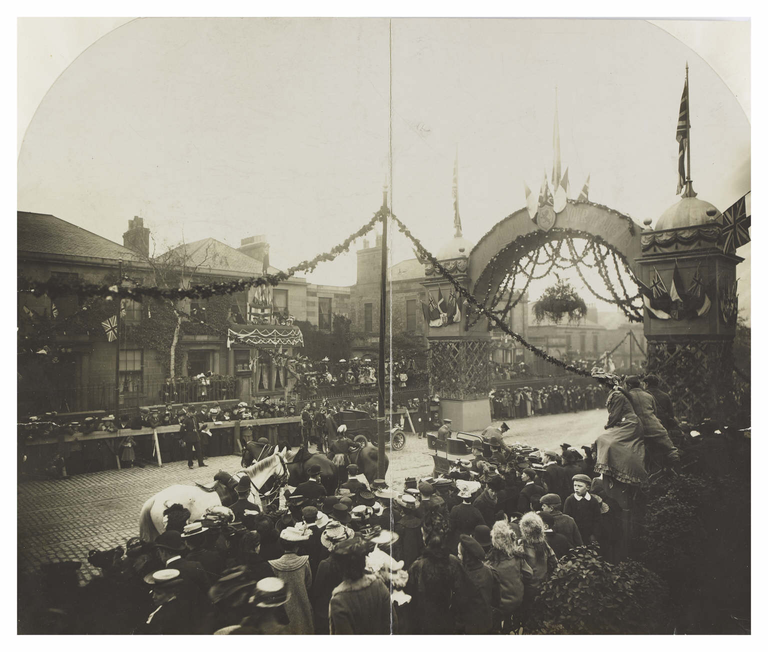
Minto Street decorated for the visit of Edward VII and Queen Alexandra in May 1903

From 1907, Newington House was occupied by the cartographer John George Bartholomew. Bartholomew moved to the house from Falcon Hall in Morningside, which was demolished shortly after the move. Bartholomew relocated his family's cartographic firm to Duncan Street, reincorporating the portico of Falcon Hall in the façade of the new works. In 1915, Bartholomew sold Newington House to the Scottish National Institution for the War Blinded. Another printing works was established at Bernard terrace by Pillans & Wilson, who moved production there from Thistle Street in the New Town in 1919.

In 1913, undeveloped land at East Craigmillar Park was purchased by the Edinburgh Association for the Provision of Hostels for Women Students. Residences were developed and first opened in 1916 with further additions in 1925. During the Second World War, they served as an internment camp for German sailors and 'undesirable aliens'. They resumed use as student residences in 1945 and remained as such until developed as private housing in 2004 and renamed East Suffolk Park.

When the Free and United Presbyterian churches united in 1900, Newington's Free congregations of Newington, Craigmillar Park, and Mayfield had joined the new United Free Church along with the United Presbyterian congregation of Hope Park. In 1929, these United Free congregations joined the Church of Scotland at the union of the two denominations. The following decades saw further congregational unions. The Newington Social Union also ceased operations in 1931. At Salisbury Road, Edinburgh's only purpose-built synagogue opened in 1932. The synagogue was consecrated by Chief Rabbi, Joseph Hertz in front of a crowd of 1,400, which included Edinburgh's lord provost, councillors, and members of parliament.

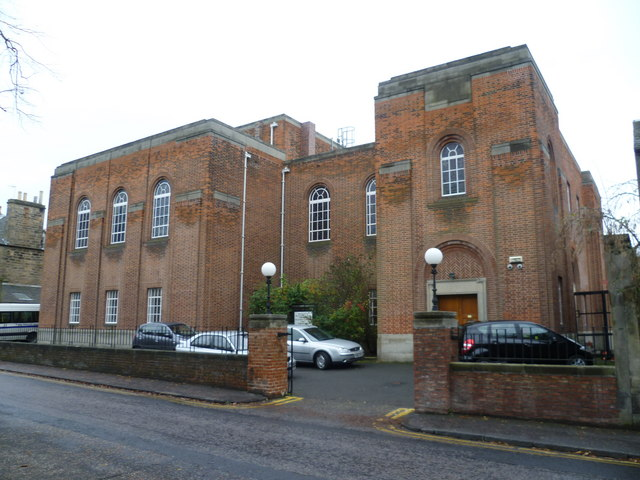
Edinburgh Hebrew Congregation's synagogue on Salisbury Road, opened 1932

In 1940, the former Hope Park United Presbyterian Church united with the former Grange Road United Presbyterian Church to form Newington South and Hope Park Church. The Hope Park buildings were demolished in 1949. In 1966, the former Mayfield established church, by then known as Mayfield South, united with the former Craigmillar Park Free Church on East Suffolk Road. The East Suffolk Road buildings were sold to St Margaret's School and the united congregation adopted the name Craigmillar Park. Newington Parish Church, which had united with St Leonard's Parish Church in 1932, was dissolved in 1976. The former Newington Free Church, by then known as St Paul's Newington, united with Kirk o' Field in the Southside in 1984. The St Paul's Newington buildings were acquired by Edinburgh City Fellowship, a non-denominational church, the following year. In 1979, the Congregationalist church on Hope Park Terrace left its buildings to unite with Augustine-Bristo Congregational Church on George IV Bridge in the Old Town.

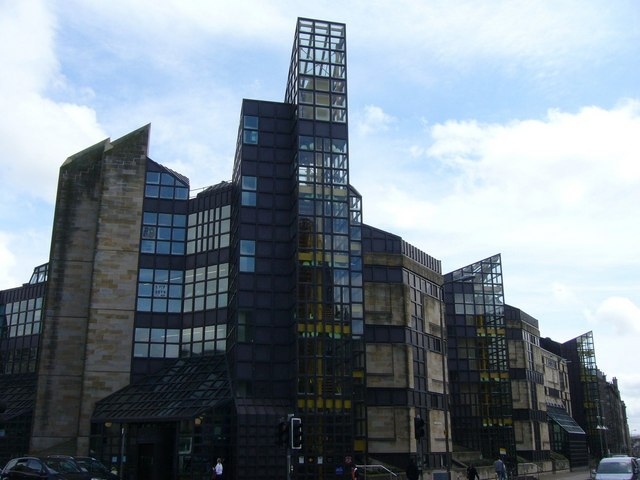
The National Library of Scotland's Causewayside building, constructed between 1984 and 1994

The late 20th and early 21st centuries saw other changes in Newington's institutions and amenities. Tram services through Newington were gradually cut between 1950 and 1956. Newington station closed to passengers on 10 September 1962. The Scottish War Blinded vacated Newington House, which was demolished in 1966 and the land sold to the University of Edinburgh. The Longmore Hospital closed in 1991 and was redeveloped as Longmore House, headquarters of Historic Scotland then, since 2015, of Historic Environment Scotland. Opposite this, the National Library of Scotland's Causewayside building was erected between 1984 and 1987 and extended between 1991 and 1994. It occupies the former site of the Middlemass biscuit factory, which the library had used as an annex since 1974. Pillans & Wilson vacated its Bernard Terrace premises in 1987. The site and an adjoining furniture depository were redeveloped as John Sinclair House, which opened as the headquarters of the Royal Commission on the Ancient and Historical Monuments of Scotland in 1991. Batholomew's closed in 1987. The Geographical Institute was retained and converted to housing around the turn of the millennium. At the same time, the works to its rear were demolished and the land developed for flats.

In education, St Margaret's School closed in 2010 after going into administration. Its East Suffolk Road buildings have been converted into a care home while the school's buildings at the former Craigmillar Park Free Church are now occupied by Iqra Academy: a mosque and Islamic education and community centre. The school's playing fields were developed for housing from 2015. The Royal (Dick) School of Veterinary Studies, which had stood on the former site of the Summerhall brewery since 1914, vacated its buildings in 2011. These were then developed as a creative centre. The Royal Blind School vacated the former West Craigmillar Asylum in 2014. In 2019, the city council approved the redevelopment of its buildings as flats.

== Geography ==
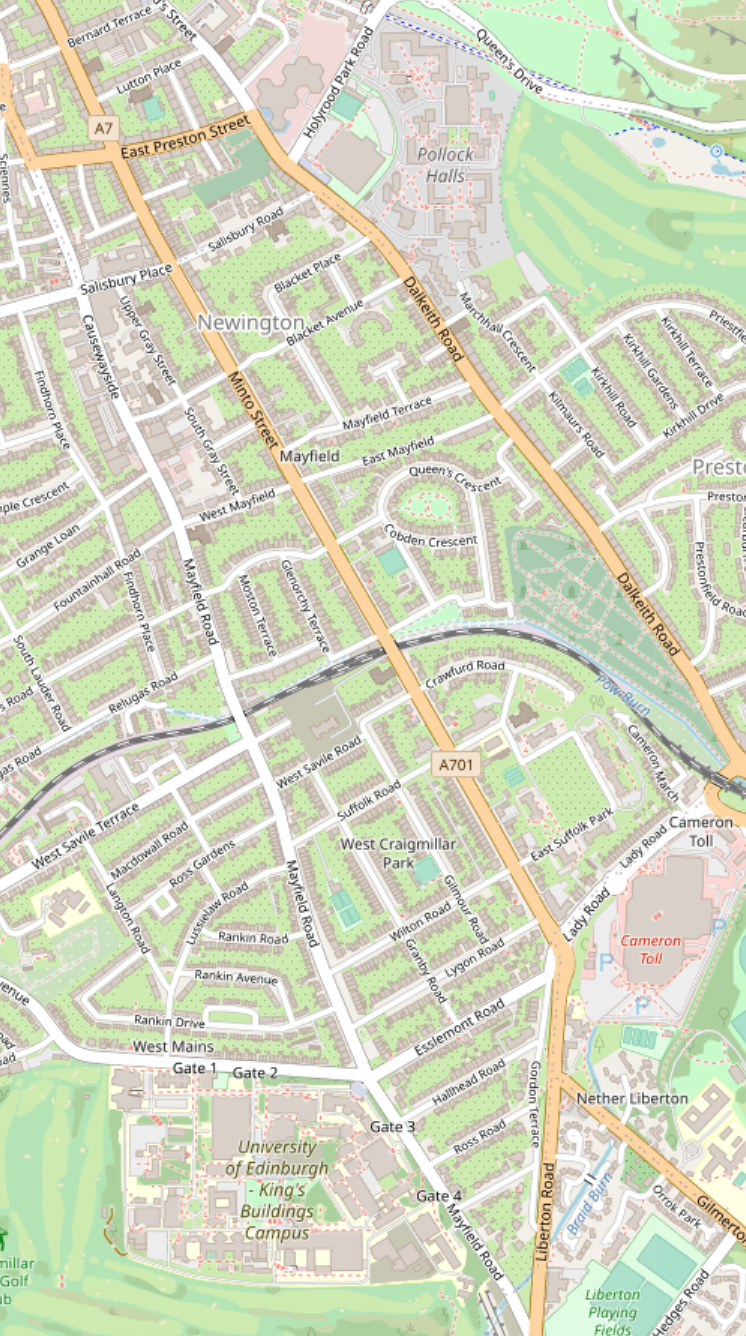
Map of Newington

The area lies on a gentle, south-facing slope and is intersected from north to south by the A701 (South Clerk Street/Newington Road/Minto Street/Mayfield Gardens/Craigmillar Park). The ancient north–south route from Edinburgh to Liberton (Causewayside/Ratcliffe Terrace/Mayfield Road) forms Newington's western boundary with Sciennes, the Grange, and Blackford while the parallel ancient route to Dalkeith (St Leonard's/Dalkeith Road) forms Newington's eastern boundary with St Leonard's and Prestonfield.

The A701 and Dalkeith Roads represent major routes into Edinburgh city centre, which is between 1 (1.5 km) and 2.5 miles (4 km) north of Newington. The Southside borders Newington north of Hope Park Terrace/Bernard Terrace. Cameron Toll and Nether Liberton border Newington south and west of the busy thoroughfares of Lady Road and Liberton Road. The former Edinburgh Suburban and Southside Junction Railway runs east to west through the southern part of Newington. Though closed to passengers in 1962, it remains in use for freight.

The Buildings of Scotland guide to Edinburgh summarises Newington's development as "attracting villas and terraces and then subjecting them to the pressures of commerce and traffic". Newington is a predominantly residential suburb. South Clerk Street and Newington Road form the main shopping street with specialised shops on Causewayside. There is also a small row of shops on Salisbury Place and on Minto Street near the corner with West Mayfield. There are many guest houses on Minto Street. Institutional buildings include the Summerhall arts centre and Historic Environment Scotland's Longmore House.

The high ground of northern Newington affords views of Arthur's Seat to the east and of Liberton and the countryside of Midlothian to the south. Despite mature tree growth throughout as well as a number of roadside "nature strips" and communal private gardens, the only public park is a small area around the Braid Burn at the southern tip of Newington. The green space of East Preston Street Burial Ground interrupts development of northern Newington while Newington Cemetery forms a prominent landscape feature at the south-eastern edge of the district.

=== Townscape ===
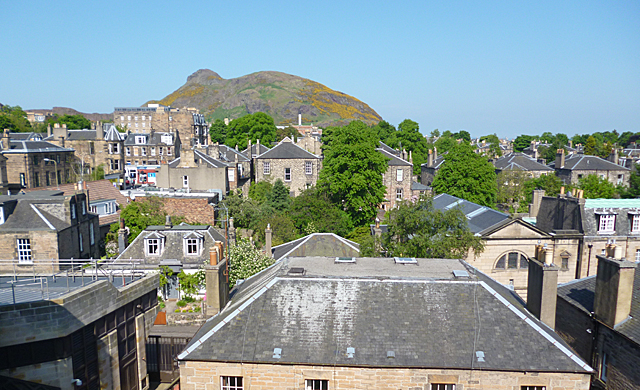
Arthur's Seat, visible over the roofs and treetops of Newington

The northern portion of Newington, between Bernard Terrace/Hope Park Terrace and Salisbury Place/Salisbury Road, is characterised by large, uninterrupted blocks. Buildings on South Clerk Street and Causewayside align to the heel of pavement while elsewhere blocks are mostly set back behind small front gardens. Buildings north of Salisbury Place/Salisbury Road range between two and a half and five storeys with an average height of four storeys.

The rigorous imposition of Georgian and Victorian feuing plans means that, south of Salisbury Place/Salisbury Road, the density of buildings has remained low. In this southern part of Newington, the area between the major north–south thoroughfares of Dalkeith Road and Minto Street is crossed by quieter residential streets. In the area between Salisbury Road, Minto Street, Dalkeith Road and West Mayfield, James Gillespie Graham's feu scheme of 1825 has created regular plots for a mix of detached villas and larger terraces, which rise to one or two storeys. Many of the front and back gardens in this area display mature tree growth. Interruptions to this pattern include the 1930s additions of the synagogue and the five-storey nurses' housing block on Salisbury Road.

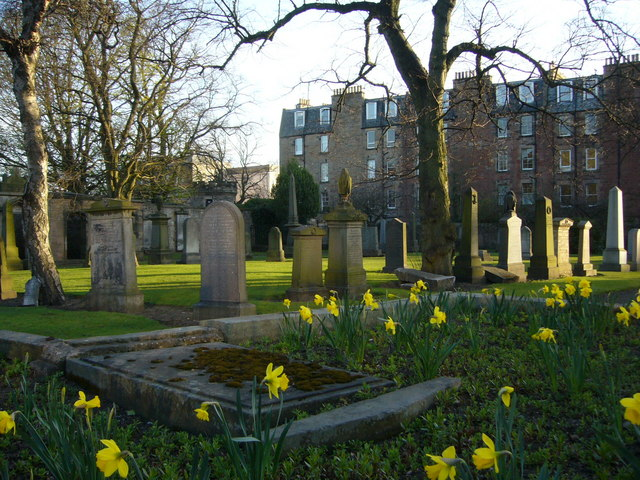
East Preston Street Burial Ground: green space in northern Newington

On the western side of Minto Street, opposite the Blacket development, the area around South Gray Street and Duncan Street is defined by a mix of residential and non-residential buildings: these include the telephone exchange and Duncan Street Baptist Church. This area also contains former industrial buildings which have been converted to residential use: the coach works and the Edinburgh Geographical Institute are examples. South of the Blacket development, large gardens with mature planting as well as a lack of through routes add to the secluded, green character of the Waverley Park development. A similar combination of low-rise housing set back behind front gardens and mature tree growth characterises the southern portion of Newington.

Local landmarks in the northern half of Newington include the prominent spire of St Peter's Episcopal Church on Lutton Place and, on the corner of Causewayside and Salisbury Place, the National Library of Scotland's Causewayside building. In the southern part of Newington, the substantial spire of Mayfield Salisbury Parish Church forms a local landmark on the corner of West Mayfield and Mayfield Terrace and Mayfield Road; as do Priestfield Parish Church on the east side of dalkeith Road and the former Craigmillar Park Free Church at the eastern end of Suffolk Road and Craigmillar Park Church on Craigmillar Park.

== Governance ==
=== Local ===
In local government, Newington is covered by the four-member Southside/Newington ward of the City of Edinburgh Council. (Note: The Southside/Newington ward covers Newington as well as the Southside, St Leonard's, Prestonfield, Cameron Toll, Nether Liberton, Blackford, the Grange, and Sciennes.) The current councillors are Cameron Rose (Conservative); Alison Dickie (SNP); Steve Burgess (Green); and Ian Perry (Labour). At the last council elections in 2017, the results for the ward were:

Southside/Newington - 4 seats
Party	Candidate	FPv%	Count
Party	Candidate	FPv%	1
Conservative	Cameron Rose (incumbent)	26.93%	3,151
SNP	Alison Dickie	20.54%	2,403
Green	Steve Burgess (incumbent)	20.35%	2,381
Labour	Ian Perry (incumbent)	20.12%	2,354
Liberal Democrats	Dan Farthing	12.05%	1,410
Electorate: 22,338 Valid: 11,699 Spoilt: 73 Quota: 2,340 Turnout: 11,772 (52.7%)

Along with Blackford, the Grange, Sciennes, and Prestonfield, most of Newington is covered by the Grange/Prestonfield Community Council. The portion of Newington north of Salsibury Place and Salisbury Road is covered by the Southside Community Council. Both community councils are currently active.

Prior to the 19th century, the area currently covered by Newington was part of the county of Midlothian and divided between the parishes of St Cuthbert's and Liberton. With a large expansion of the burgh's boundaries in 1832, the area of Newington north of the Pow Burn was annexed to Edinburgh while a further boundary extension in 1882 incorporated all the suburb north of what is now Esslemont Road. The southern tip of Newington was added to the city in 1896.

=== Parliamentary ===
In the Scottish Parliament, most of Newington lies within the Edinburgh Southern constituency, which has been represented by Daniel Johnson (Labour) since 2016. The portion of Newington north of Blacket Place and Duncan Street lies within the Edinburgh Central constituency, which has been represented by Angus Robertson (SNP) since the 2021 election. Both constituencies are part of the Lothian electoral region.

In the House of Commons, the same portion of Newington that lies within the Edinburgh Southern constituency of the Scottish Parliament lies within the Edinburgh South constituency. Ian Murray (Labour) has represented this seat since 2010. The remainder of Newington lies within the Edinburgh East. This seat has been represented by Tommy Sheppard (SNP) since 2015.

With the incorporation of most of Newington into Edinburgh, the area's representation in parliament was as part of the Edinburgh constituency. Since the division of Edinburgh into constituencies in 1885, almost all of Newington has been part of Edinburgh South.

=== Conservation areas ===
The northern portion of Newington, between Bernard Terrace/Hope Park Terrace and Salisbury Place/Salisbury Road, lies within the southern portion of the South Side Conservation Area, designated in 1975.

Immediately south of this, the area of Newington north of East and West Mayfield is covered the Blacket Conservation Area. Designated in 1972, this incorporates Salisbury Green in St Leonard's and the area around Marchhall Place at the northern tip of Prestonfield while excluding the west side of Causewayside/Ratcliffe Terrace south of the National Library of Scotland's Causewayside building.

The southern part of Newington is covered by the Craigmillar Park Conservation Area, which was designated in 1997. The area's boundary runs west along West Mayfield, south along Mayfield Road, north along the A701, east along Lady Road, west along the railway line, then north along the A701 to its starting point at West Mayfield.

The remaining area west of Dalkeith Road lies within the Waverley Park Conservation Area, which was designated in 1977.

== Demographics ==
The census data zones that mostly cover the area of Newington had a combined population of 11,130 in 2019 with 4,056 dwellings in 2020 at 51.66 dwellings per hectare.

The area is relatively prosperous. As of 2020, all but one of the data zones are in the ninth and tenth deciles of the Scottish Index of Multiple Deprivation: the least-deprived deciles of the index. The only exception is Newington and Dalkeith Road – 05, which is in the eighth decile; this data zone covers Lutton Place, Oxford Street, and the northern end of Dalkeith Road. In 2018, the mean house price in Newington was £403,948 relative to £208,643 in Edinburgh as a whole and £181,457 across Scotland. In 2018, 490 children in Newington were in receipt of child benefit and the school attendance rate stood at 94.63 relative to 93.94 across Edinburgh.

Newington is one of Edinburgh's most ethnically diverse areas. In the Southside/Newington ward, the 2022 census found 15.2% of the population was of Asian descent relative to 8.6% in the rest of Edinburgh. The African/Caribbean category accounted for 1.4% of the ward's population; Other/Mixed for 5.8%; and White for 77.6%.

Ethnicity	Southside/Newington	Edinburgh
White	77.6%	84.9%
Asian	15.2%	8.6%
Black	1.4%	2.1%
Mixed	2.3%	2.5%
Other	3.5%	1.9%

== Architecture ==
=== Religious ===
Notable religious buildings in Newington include:

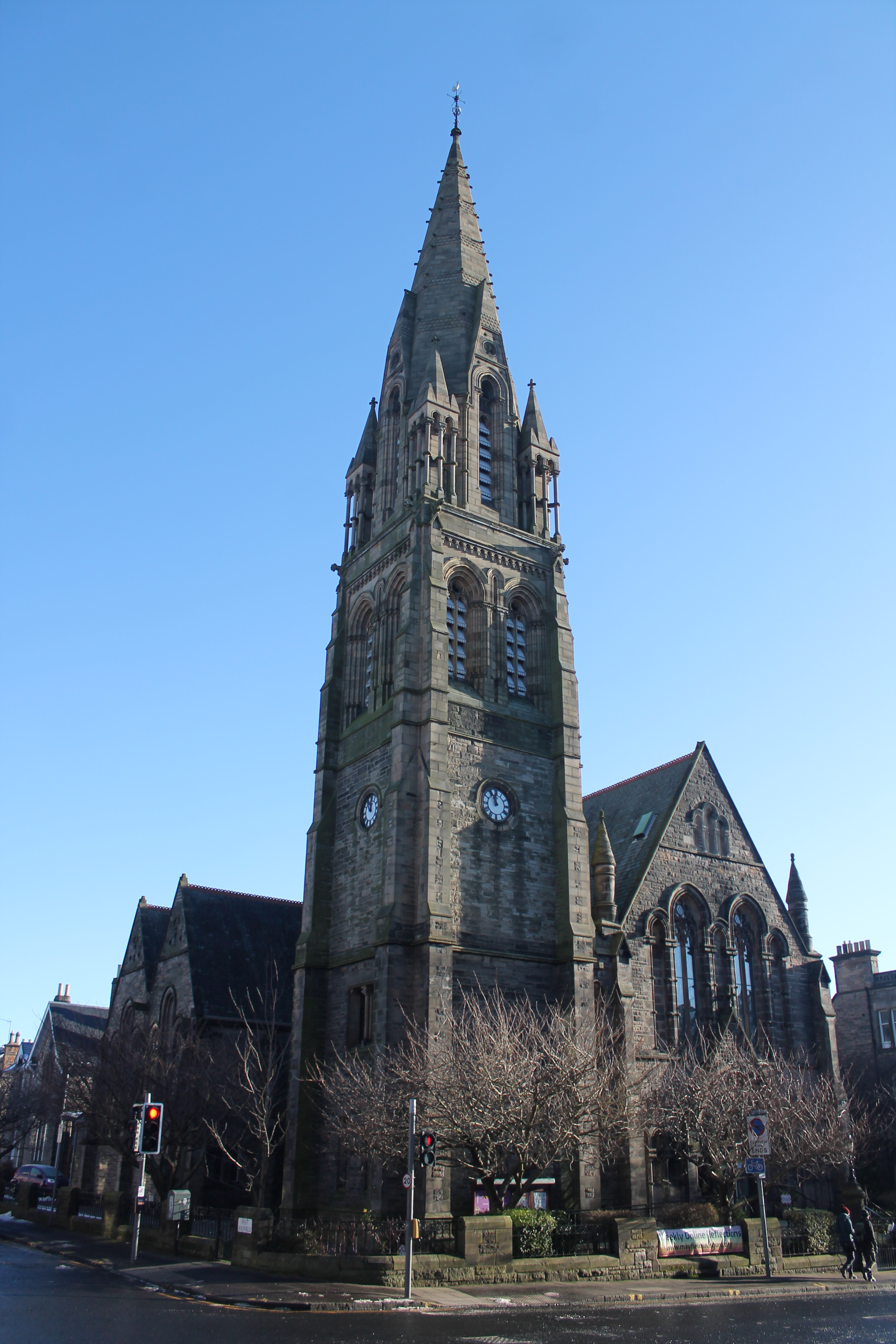
Newington Trinity Church, constructed between 1876 and 1894 to a design by Hippolyte Blanc

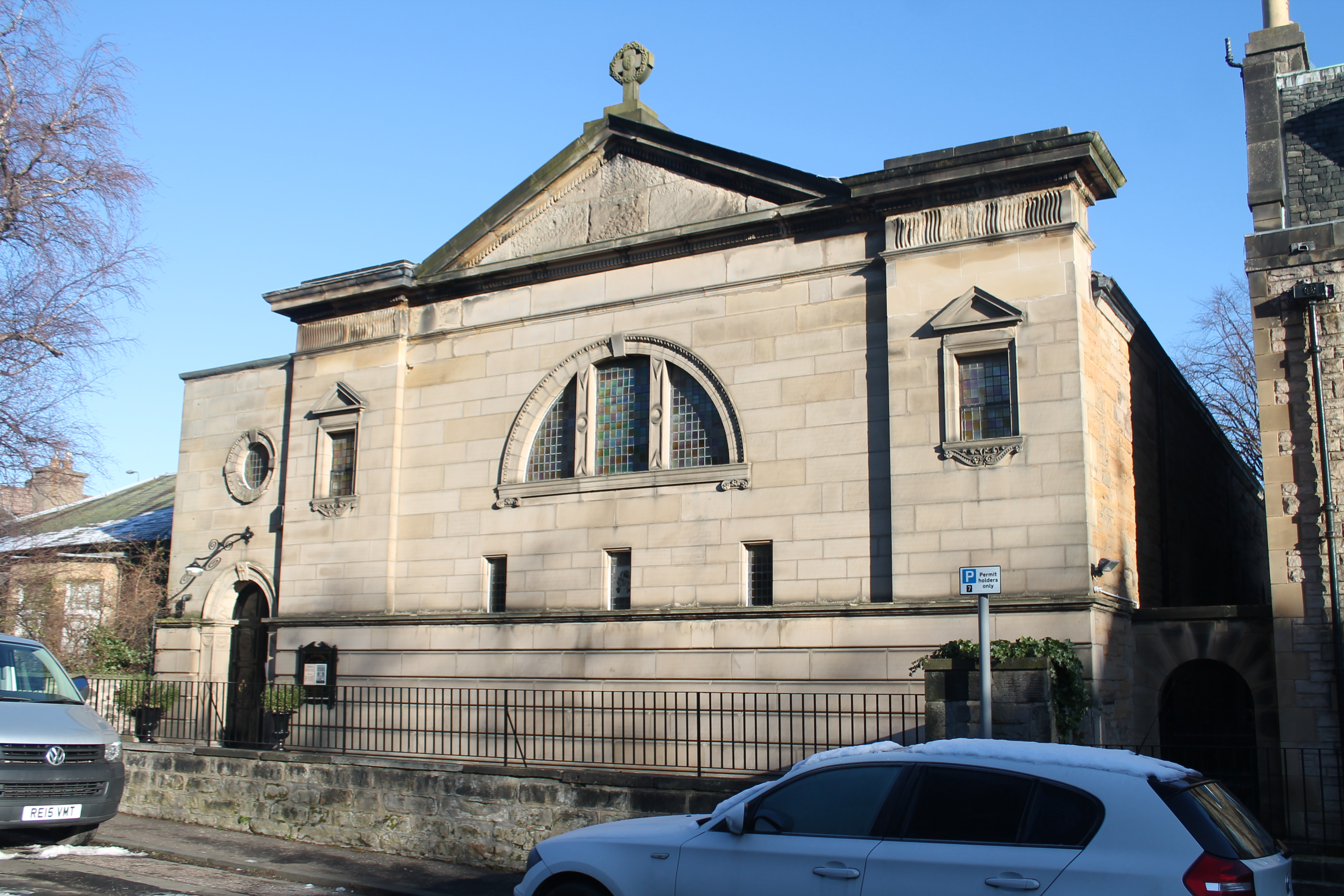
St Columba's Roman Catholic Church, completed in 1888 to a design by Rhoderic Cameron

- Newington Trinity Church, Mayfield Road: designed by Hippolyte Blanc in the French Gothic style and constructed between 1876 and 1879. Its 48 m (157 ft) spire was added in 1894, at which time the apse was enlarged. The roof, including its flèche, was destroyed by fire in 1969 and the ceiling was reconstructed by David Carr and Stewart Tod. The church includes a notable collection of late 19th and early 20th-century stained glass, including works by Oscar Paterson, Ballantine & Gardiner, and Guthrie & Wells. The church's spire is a prominent local landmark. J. Brian Crossland referred to the church as "a building of great originality and importance".
- St Peter's Episcopal Church, Lutton Place: constructed between 1857 and 1867 to an early Geomteric Gothic design by London-based architect William Slater. The steeple rises to 56 m (184 ft) and is a prominent landmark in northern Newington. The tower incorporates a 1935 statue of Saint Peter by Dorothy M. McKay. The interior includes arcades supported on Peterhead granite columns, stained glass by Clayton & Bell, and encaustic tiles by Mintons in the chancel. The building is notable as an early example of the influence of the Oxford Movement on Scottish Episcopalianism. J. Brian Crossland called it: "probably as nearly approaches the ecclesiological influence in creating a nineteenth-century Anglican church as reason and moderation would allow".
- Craigmillar Park Church, Craigmillar Park: opened in 1878 as Mayfield Church, it was built to a Gothic design by Hardy & Wright. The interior was reorganised by Ian Gordon Lindsay in 1956 and includes stained glass by Margaret Chilton and Marjorie Kemp, added between 1927 and 1945. A steeple was planned but never built.
- Iqra Academy, East Suffolk Road: built as Craigmillar Park Free Church to a cruciform Perpendicular Gothic design of Sydney Mitchell & Wilson and opened in 1898. Like Craigmillar Park Church, it has an incomplete tower base: this was meant to support a turreted tower and octagonal spire. The former church hall is notable for its octagonal floor plan. After the building was purchased by St Margaret's School, the interior of the sanctuary was divided into two storeys by R.D. Cameron in 1976. Cameron retained the large hammerbeam ceiling.
- St Columba's Roman Catholic Church, Upper Gray Street: completed in 1888 to a French Renaissance design by Rhoderic Cameron, which incorporates a pedimented façade. The hall was added in 1927 to a design by Reginald Fairlie.
- Edinburgh Hebrew Congregation, Salisbury Road: opened in 1932 and built in red brick to a simplified Byzantine design of James Miller. The interior, which was divided into two storeys by Dick Peddie & McKay in 1979, includes stained glass of 1957 by William Wilson.
- King's Hall, South Clerk Street: opened as Newington Free Church in 1843 to a design of David Cousin and recast in 1847. In 1907, Henry & Maclennan added a chancel to the interior and added a Gothic frontage in the 16th-century Scottish Gothic style.
- The former Hope Park & Buccleuch Congregational Church, Hope Park Terrace: completed in 1876 to a Lombard design by Sutherland & Walker, incorporating a short tower.
- Duncan Street Baptist Church, Duncan Street: completed around 1843, it has a heavy, attenuated classical façade of three bays. The interior was recast in 1888, including the removal of the gallery on two sides.
- Hope Park United Presbyterian Church (demolished), Causewayside: designed by Peddie & McKay and opened in 1867, the building's Romanesque design incorporated a rood of pitched bays with wheel windows in the upper storey as well as a tall tower with a short spire. The building was vacated by its congregation in 1940 and demolished in 1949.
- New United Presbyterian Church (demolished), designed by James Graham Fairley and opened in 1897. The congregation united with North Mayfield (now Newington Trinity Church) in 1958 and the building was replaced by Newington Library in 1975.

=== Public and commercial ===
Notable public and commercial buildings in Newington include:

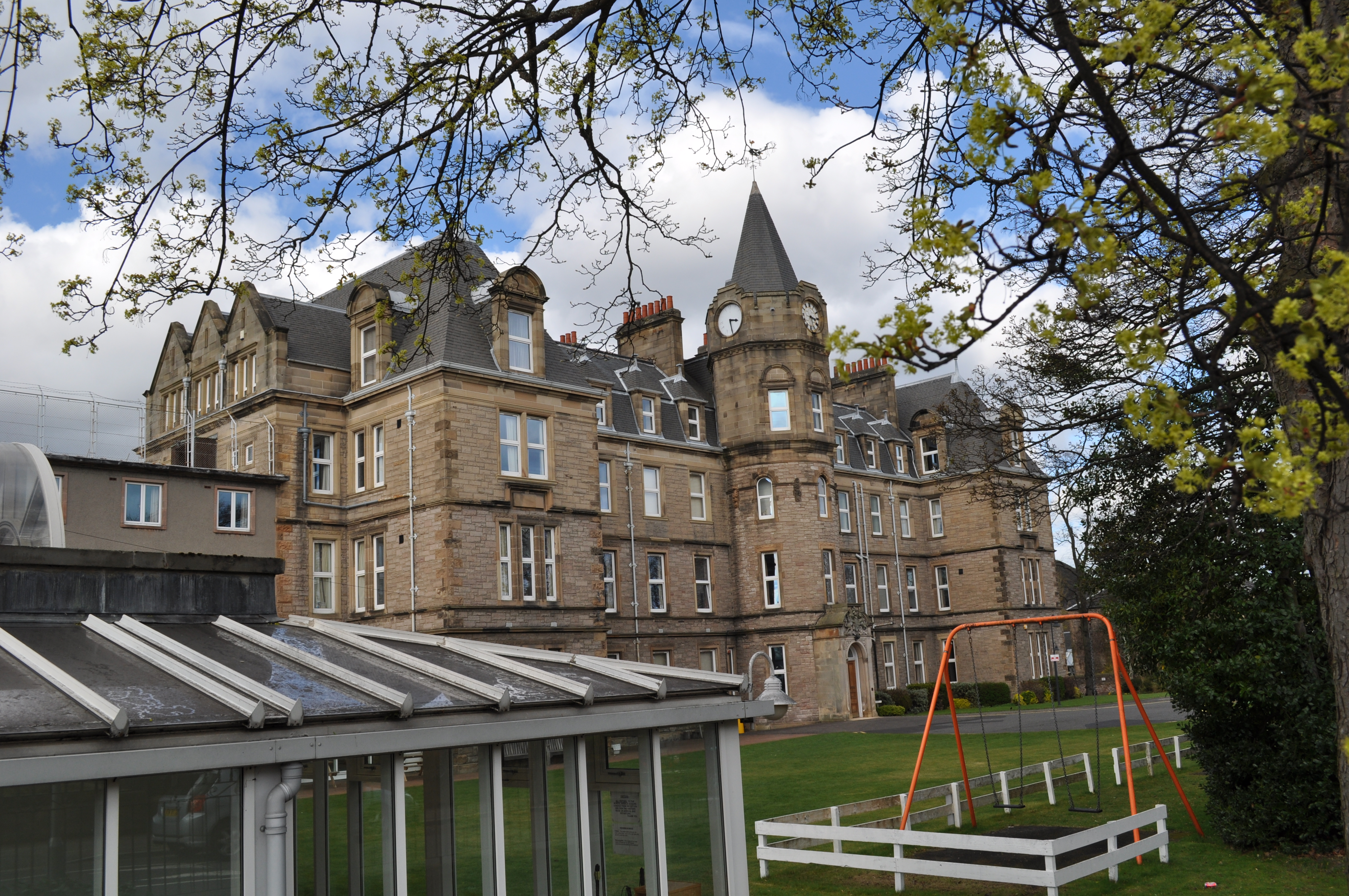
The former Royal Blind Asylum, constructed in 1874 to a design by Charles Leadbetter

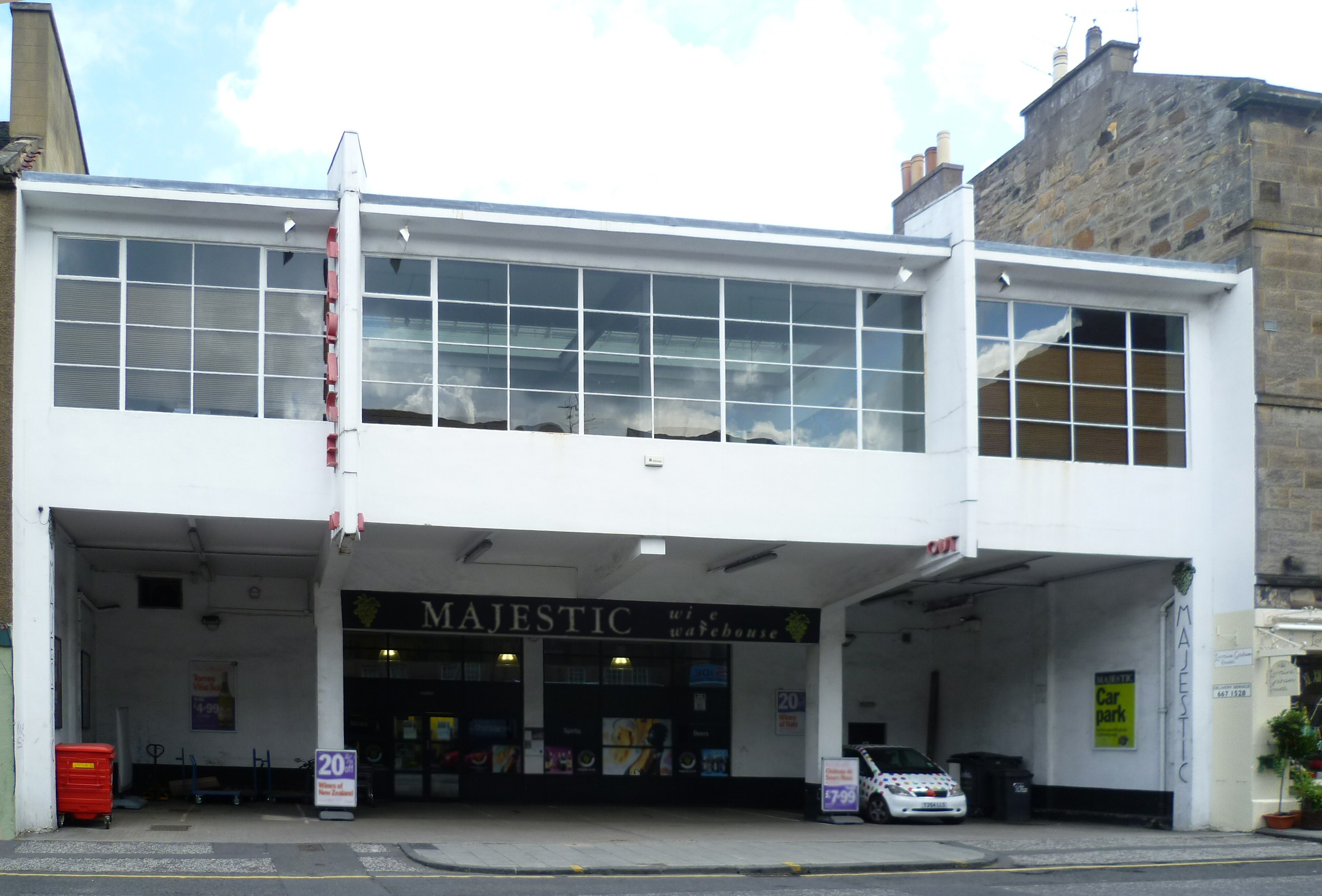
Southside Garage, designed by Basil Spence and completed in 1934

- Summerhall, Causewayside: designed by David McArthy and opened as the Royal (Dick) School of Veterinary Studies in 1916. The Buildings of Scotland guide to Edinburgh describes the style as "Fag-end Wrenaissance". The frontage consists of eleven bays with pavilions at either end and a taller central pavilion. The site also includes a seven-storey Brutalist block by Alan Reiach, Eric Hall & Partners.
- Longmore House, Salisbury Place: opened in 1879 as the Edinburgh Hospital for Incurables to a neoclassical design of John More Dick Peddie and extended to the rear in 1891. The façade focuses on a three-storey pedimented centrepiece.
- The former Royal Blind Asylum: constructed in 1874 to a French Renaissance design by Charles Leadbetter, which incorporates a mansard roof and a central clock tower. Royal Blind vacated the building in 2014 and, as of 2021, it is being redeveloped as the centrepiece of a housing development by Cala Homes.
- National Library of Scotland Annexe, Causewayside: built between 1984 and 1987 to a design of Andrew Merrylees & Associates and extended between 1991 and 1994. It is faced in sandstone from Newbigging with jagged glass pinnacles, which make it a prominent landmark in its vicinity.
- Southside Garage: an International style garage of 1933-1934, notable as an early work of Basil Spence and as one of Edinburgh's first modernist buildings. Faced in white concrete, the façade consists of a glazed upper storey cantilevered over a forecourt on two stanchions. The building is currently in use as an off-licence.
- The former Geographical Institute, Duncan Street: a two-storey classical office building with a fourteen-bay façade, built to a design by Harry Ramsay Taylor and opened in 1910. The portico was designed around 100 years prior by Thomas Hamilton for Falcon Hall in Morningside and incorporated in the Geographical Institute after Falcon Hall was demolished. Bartholomew's vacated the building in 1987 and it was converted flats around the turn of the millennium.
- The former Craigmillar Park Golf Club Clubhouse, Pavilion Crescent: by Alexander Lorne Campbell in the Arts and Crafts style. Dating to 1895, it is a rare example of a small-scale late 19th-century golf clubhouse.
- Preston Street Primary School, East Preston Street: a red sandstone building of 1897 with white dressings and a prominent wood and copper ventilator on the roof. The design, which is credited to Robert Wilson but was mostly executed by J.A. Carfrae, incorporates two gabled ends and is inspired by Jacobean and Scandinavian architecture.
- The former Causewayside Lads' Institute at 27-29 Ratcliffe Terrace, designed by Victor James de Spiganovicz and opened in 1907 to ‘provide wholesome recreation and amusement’ and take boys off the street.

=== Domestic ===
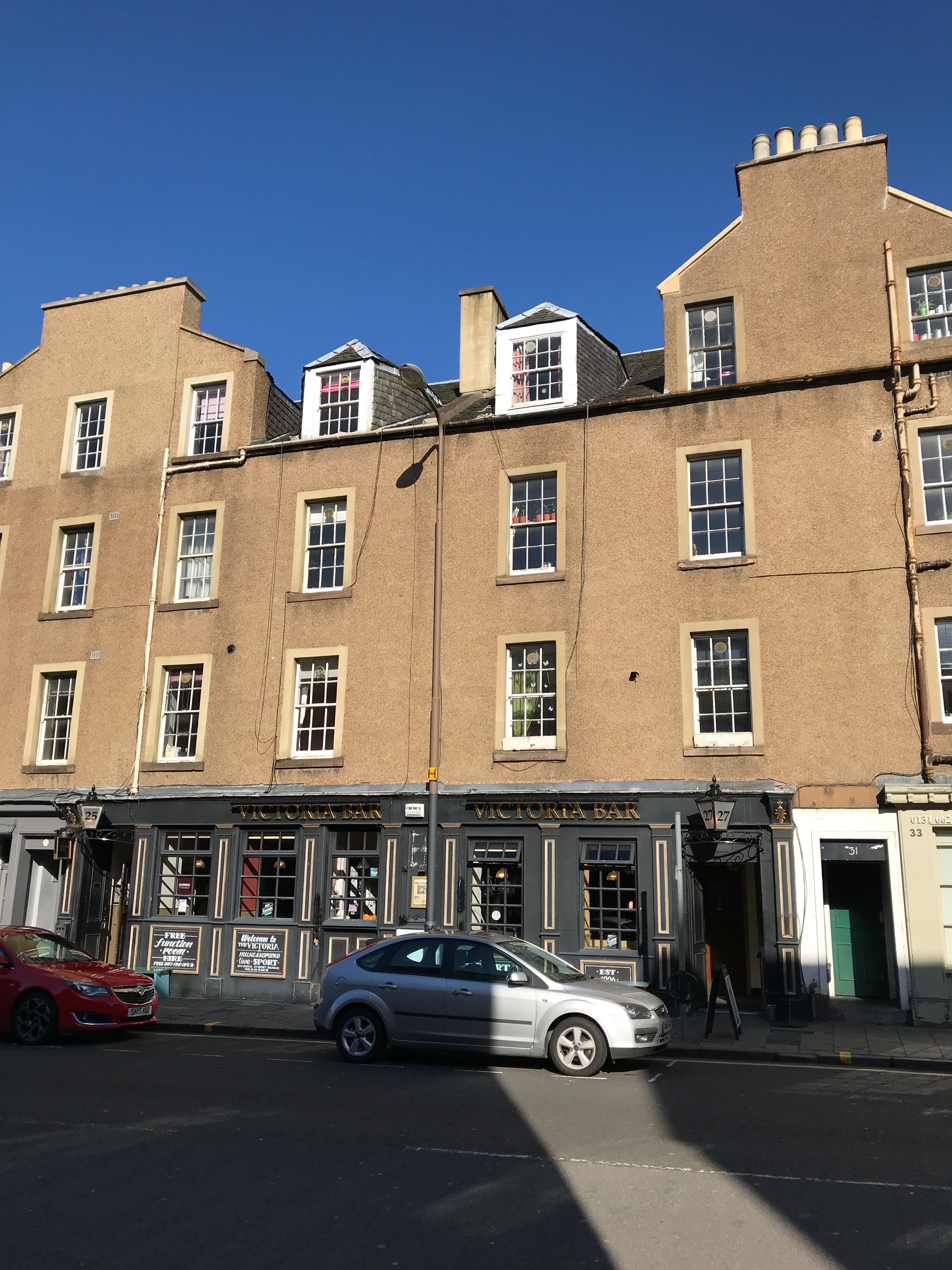
18th-century vernacular housing on Causewayside

Almost all buildings in Newington date from the early 19th century onwards. There are significant 18th-century vernacular houses at 21–25 Causewayside and one Ratcliffe Terrace. The former dates to the late 18th century and displays two wall-head chimneys. Also on Causewayside was Broadstairs House and Wormwoodhall, which may have dated to the 16th century and which was demolished in 1880. Its front consisted of a central gable with a door accessed by a forestair and flanked by other gables.

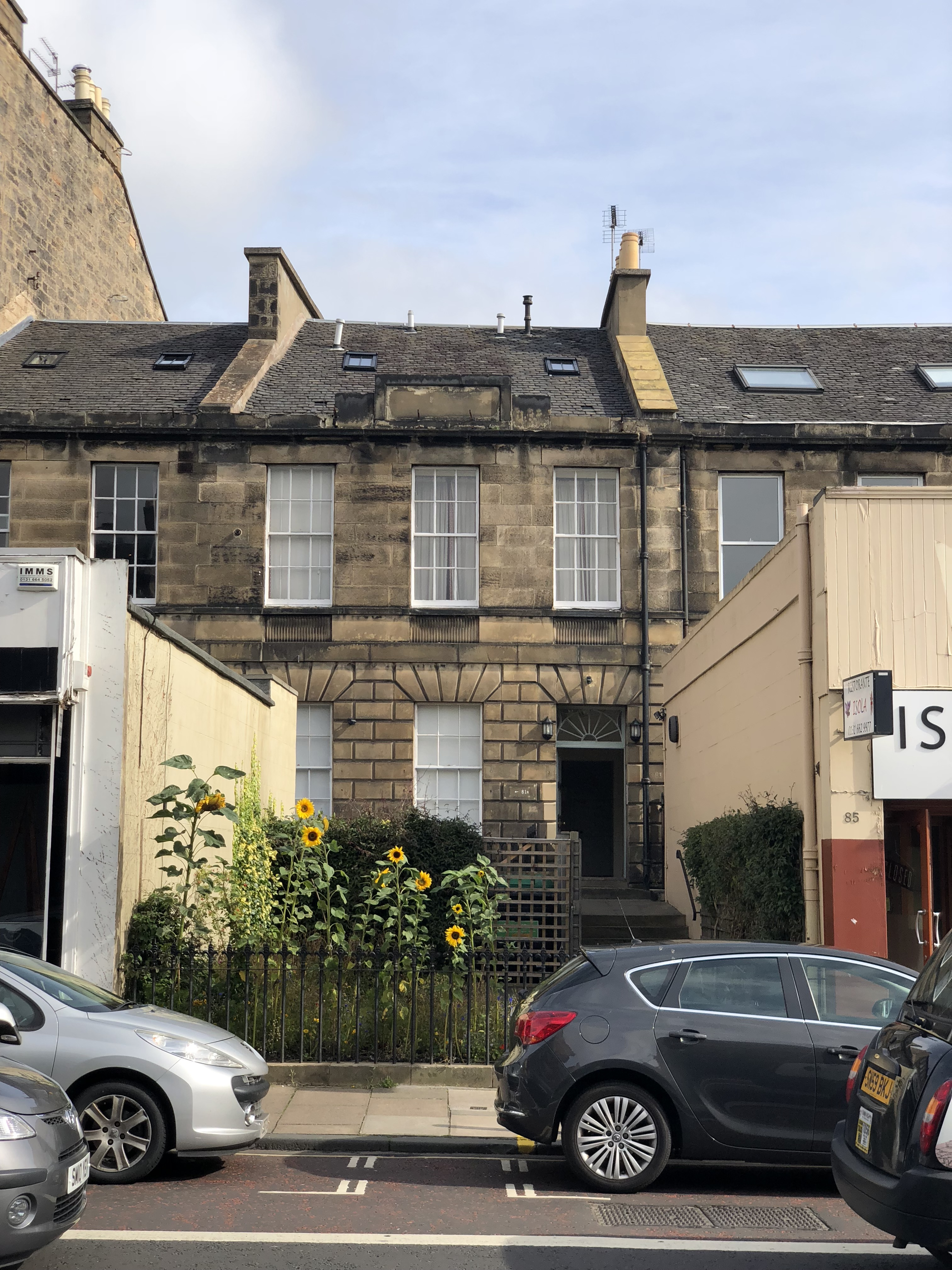
A Georgian house on Newington Road, one of the few to retain its front garden: shops have been constructed on the gardens on either side.

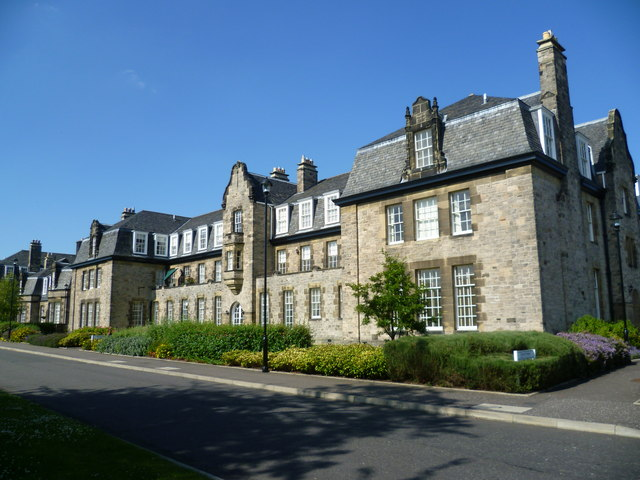
One of the former women's halls of residence on East Suffolk Road, constructed from 1914 to a design of A.K. Robertson

In northern Newington, two and three-storey houses were developed along South Clerk Street and Newington Road from 1805. In many cases, single-storey shops were constructed on the front gardens of these properties. Notable among houses in this area is West Newington House at 10 Newington Road. Dating to around 1805, its façade sports large Doric pilasters. Early Victorian tenements, as at Lutton Place and Oxford Street, adopt a classical idiom similar to that of the preceding late Georgian era. Later Victorian tenements, such as those of 1887–1888 along Dalkeith Road, display features such as spired towers and mansard roofs.

South of Preston Street and west of Minto Street, Georgian and Victorian houses stand in larger plots amid now mature tree growth. The first of these was Newington House: an imposing neoclassical mansion, which may have been designed by its first owner, Benjamin Bell. 23–25 Blacket Place, by James Gowans and Arthur Lodge on Dalkeith Road, a low Greek Revival villa by Thomas Hamilton, completed in 1830. Three sets of Tudor Gothic gates and lodges on Dalkeith Road and two on Minto Street were constructed around 1825 to restrict access to the Blacket development. Though the Minto Street lodges were demolished in 1925, all three on Dalkeith Road remain, testament to the exclusive character of the original development.

South of this area, Victorian villas and terraces tend towards slightly denser development: David Cousin's terrace of 1862 at East Mayfield and Peel Terrace is an example. Other notable terraces in southern Newington include the eclectically detailed range at 2–28 Moston Terrace.

One prominent institutional residential development is the monumental five-storey former Longmore Hospital Nurse Home on Salisbury Road. Constructed to a design of J. Douglas Miller between 1938 and 1947, it dominates its surrounding buildings. Another is the former women's halls of residence on East Suffolk Road. Begun in 1914, it centres on a green. The blocks, which incorporate Dutch gables and mansard roofs, were designed in the Arts & Crafts style by A.K. Robertson, drawing inspiration from Robert Lorimer.

Later developments include a 1930s tenement block on the corner of Bernard Terrace and Dalkeith Road, which is the work of City Architect, Ebenezer James MacRae. Modern infill developments stand on sites including Causewayside, East Newington Place, and Peel Terrace. Many detached and semi-detached properties were augmented by ground floor extensions from the later 20th century onwards.

== Amenities ==
=== Transport ===
==== Buses ====
Lothian Buses serves the route of the A701 through Newington is with the 3 (Clovenstone–Mayfield/Dalkeith), 7 (Newhaven–Royal Infirmary), 8 (Muirhouse–Royal Infirmary), 29 (Silverknowes–Gorebridge), 31 (East Craigs–Bonnyrigg/Polton Mill), 37 (Silverknowes–Penicuik Deanburn/Easter Bush), 47 (Granton–Penicuik Ladywood), 49 (Rosewell–Fort Kinnaird).

The route along East Preston Street and Dalkeith Road is served by the 2 (Gyle Centre–The Jewel), the 30 (Clovenstone–Musselburgh), and the 33 (Wester Hailes–Millerhill). The 2 and the 30 turn off Dalkeith Road at Prestonfield Avenue. The 14 (Muirhouse–Greendykes) also follows Dalkeith Road, turning at Prestonfield Avenue. The 5 (Hunter's Tryst–The Jewel) goes via Salisbury Place and Newington Road.

The 12 (The Gyle Shopping Centre, Edinburgh–King's Road, Portobello) serves Causewayside and Lady Road. Lady Road is also served by the 24 and the 38 (West Granton–Royal Infirmary).

Borders Buses also operates the X62 (Edinburgh–Galashiels) via the A701 through Newington as well as the X95 (Edinburgh–Carlisle) via Dalkeith Road.

==== Rail ====
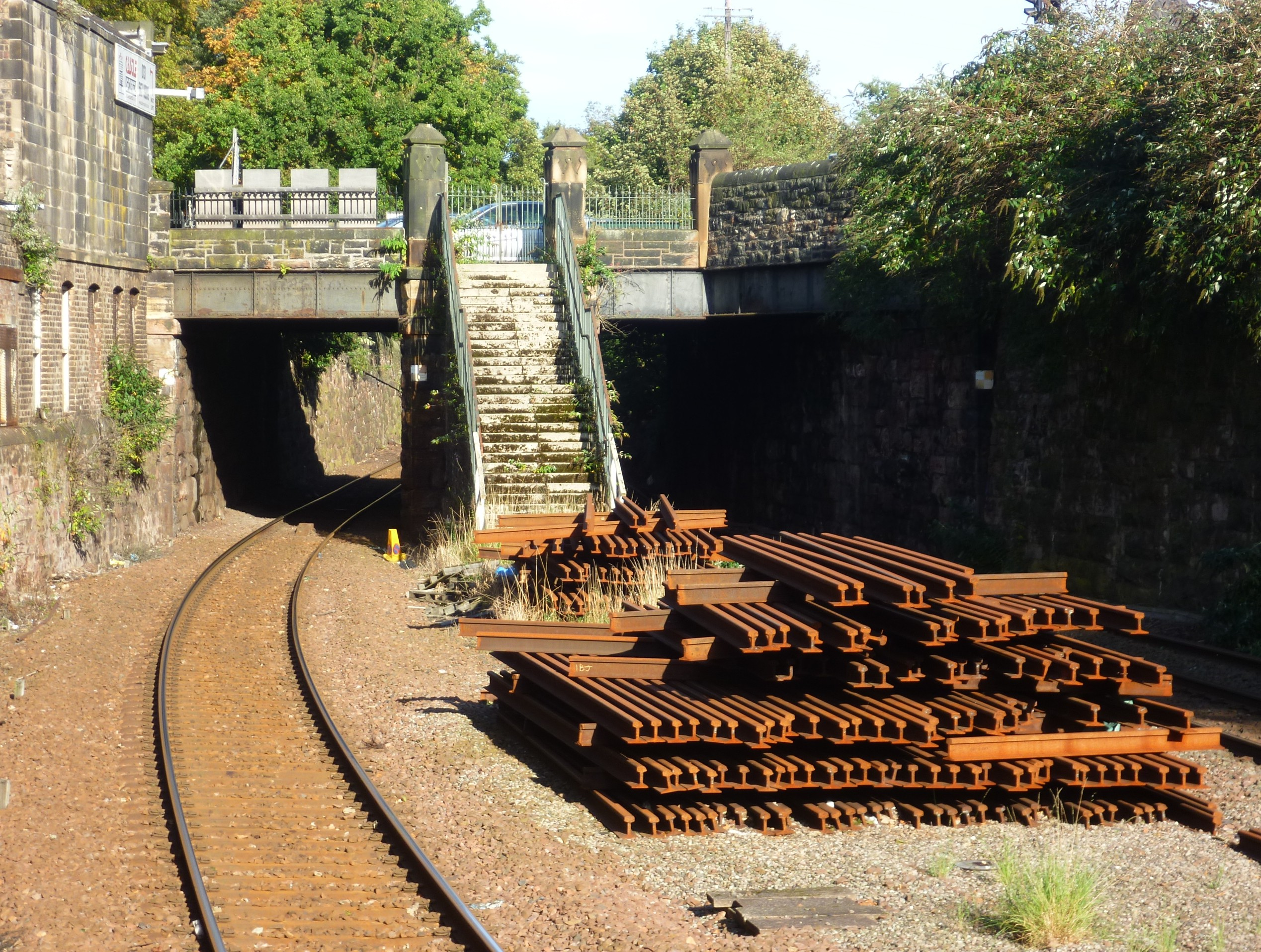
The remains of Newington railway station on Craigmillar Park. Situated on the Edinburgh Suburban and Southside Junction Railway, the station was open to passengers between 1884 and 1962. The line remains open to freight.

Now used by freight trains, the former Edinburgh Suburban and Southside Junction Railway travels east–west through the southern part of Newington. Newington railway station on Craigmillar Park served passengers between 1884 and 1962. Proposals to reopen the line were subject of a feasibility study by the City of Edinburgh Council in 2004; the council, however, rejected the plan in a further feasibility report of 2008. In November 2020, Cabinet Secretary for Net Zero, Energy and Transport, Michael Matheson claimed the reopening of the line to passenger was one of a number of plans being considered by the Scottish Government as part of its second Strategic Transport Projects Review.

==== Proposed tram extension ====
As part of the initial plans for Edinburgh Trams, the City of Edinburgh Council proposed a route to connect Waverley Station with Newcraighall via Newington. In February 2005, a proposal to impose road tolls was defeated in a local referendum, removing a potential source of funds for the scheme. With the Scottish Executive's refusal of further support the following month, the plan was indefinitely shelved. The plan was, however, included among a "wish list" of further routes offered by Alastair Richard, Edinburgh Trams' managing director, in 2010. The plans were revived in the city council's 2019 Edinburgh City Centre Transformation Strategy. In 2021, the City of Edinburgh Council's City Mobility Plan included plans for an extension of the Edinburgh Trams network along the A701 through Newington to the Edinburgh BioQuarter.

=== Religion ===
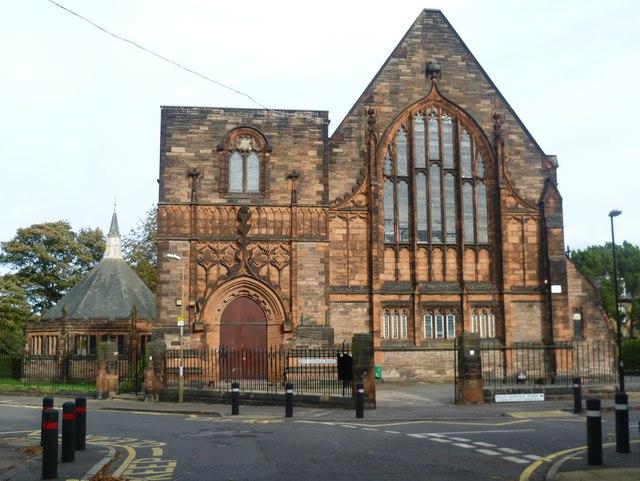
Iqra Academy: a mosque and Islamic community centre on East Suffolk Road. It was opened in 1898 as Craigmillar Park Free Church and used by St Margaret's School between 1966 and 2010.

The Church of Scotland has one congregation based in Newington. On the corner of Mayfield Road and West Mayfield stands Newington Trinity Church. It was established in January 2025 though union with Priestfield Church and Craigmillar Park Church. A Chinese evangelical congregation also meets for worship in the building.

St Peter's, a congregation of the Scottish Episcopal Church, is located on Lutton Place while a Roman Catholic church, St Columba's, is located on Upper Gray Street. The churches opened in 1865 and 1889 respectively. Nearby St Columba's, stands Duncan Street Baptist Church, an independent, evangelical Baptist congregation, which moved to its current building in 1863. Since 1985, the former Newington Free Church buildings on South Clerk Street have been used by Edinburgh Community Church, a non-denominational church, under the name King's Hall.

There are two non-Christian houses of worship in Newington. One is a synagogue, Edinburgh Hebrew Congregation, located on Salisbury Road, it opened in 1932 to house a congregation which can trace its roots back to the establishment of Edinburgh's first Jewish congregation in 1817. It is Edinburgh's only synagogue and stands in the Orthodox tradition. Though not part of the United Synagogue, it is under the aegis of the Chief Rabbi. The other is Iqra Academy, which serves as a mosque as well as an Islamic educational and cultural centre. It occupies the former Craigmillar Park Free Church buildings on East Suffolk Road, which were vacated by St Margaret's School at its closure in 2010.

=== Cemeteries ===
Newington Cemetery is located near the southern end of Dalkeith Road. It was opened by the Metropolitan Burial Association in 1846. Further north, at the corner of Dalkeith Road and East Preston Street, is East Preston Street Burial Ground, founded as a burial site within the parish of St Cuthbert's in 1820. Both are closed to new graves and are maintained by the City of Edinburgh Council.

=== Education ===
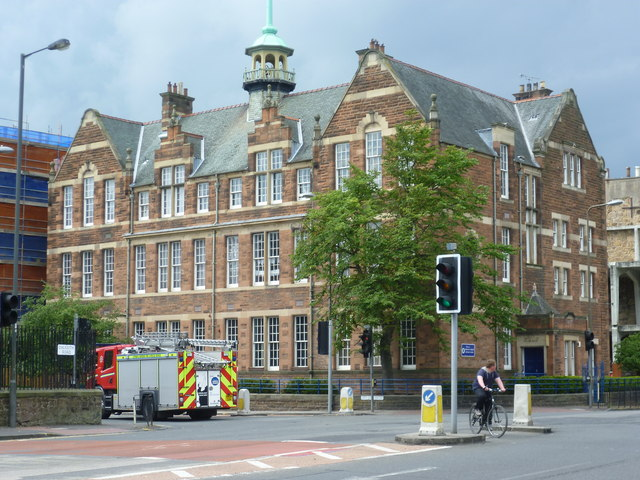
Preston Street Primary School, opened in 1897

The only school in Newington is Preston Street Primary School on the corner of East Preston Street and Dalkeith Road, which opened in 1897. Most of Newington is divided between the non-denominational primary school catchment areas of Preston Street Primary School and Sciennes Primary School. The southern point of Newington below Esslemont Road lies within the catchment of Liberton Primary School while the area around the former student residences on East Suffolk Park is covered by the catchment area of Prestonfield Primary School. Preston Street and Sciennes primary schools feed into James Gillespie's High School in Marchmont while Liberton Primary School feeds into Liberton High School and the Prestonfield Primary School catchment is divided between Liberton and Castlebrae high schools.

In denominational state schools, Newington is entirely covered by the catchment area of St Peter's Roman Catholic Primary School in Morningside, which feeds into St Thomas of Aquin's High School in Lauriston.

The University of Edinburgh's main site in the Southside and Old Town; its main accommodation of the Pollock Halls in St Leonard's; and its sciences site at the King's Buildings in Blackford are all located near Newington. Nevertheless, the only sites of the university in Newington itself are accommodation blocks on South Clerk Street, East Newington Place, Blackwood Crescent, Ratcliffe Terrace, Craigmillar Park, and Gordon Terrace.

=== Culture and leisure ===
The former buildings of the Royal (Dick) Veterinary College on Causewayside have been used since 2011 as Summerhall: an arts and events venue.

Newington Library is located nearby on Fountainhall Road in the Grange. Opened in 1975, the library is operated as a public lending library by the City of Edinburgh Council. The National Library of Scotland's maps reading room is located in its Causewayside building.

Craigmillar Park Bowling Club is located on Gilmour Road in West Craigmillar Park. There are tennis, squash, and gym facilities at the Waverley Lawn Tennis, Squash and Sports Club on Suffolk Road.

== Notable residents ==
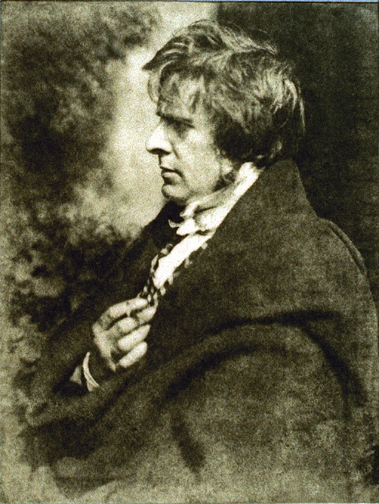
Artist and pioneering photographer David Octavius Hill, who died in 1870 at his house on Mayfield Terrace

The first prominent inhabitant of Newington was the surgeon Benjamin Bell, who constructed Newington House. Bell's successors at Newington House included the Liberal politician Duncan McLaren and the house's last private owner, the cartographer John George Bartholomew. Other prominent early inhabitants of Newington included William Blackwood, founder of his namesake publishing house, and Robert Knox, the anatomist infamous for his involvement in the Burke and Hare murders.

In the early Victorian period, Newington's inhabitants included prominent leaders of the Disruption of 1843, William Cunningham and Thomas Guthrie. Other prominent ministers then resident in Newington included John Brown and Thomas M'Crie, leading figures in the United Secession Church. David Octavius Hill, the artist and pioneering photographer famed for depicting the Disruption's leaders, died at his house in Newington in 1870.

In 1878, French teacher Eugene Chantrelle murdered his wife Elizabeth Cullen Dwyer at their house on Newington Road.

In the 20th century, inhabitants included the entertainer Will Fyffe, athlete and missionary Eric Liddell, geneticist C. H. Waddington, choreographer Lindsay Kemp, Corries folk singer Ronnie Browne and author Ian Rankin.
