= Prestonfield =

Prestonfield may refer to the one of following:

- Prestonfield, Edinburgh, an area of the city of Edinburgh, Scotland
- Prestonfield, Linlithgow, a football stadium in Linlithgow, Scotland, home of Linlithgow Rose F.C.

== See also ==
- Prestonfield House, a boutique hotel in Prestonfield, Edinburgh.
