= Newington Trinity Church =

Christian church in Scotland

Coordinates: 55°55′59.10″N 3°10′37.93″W

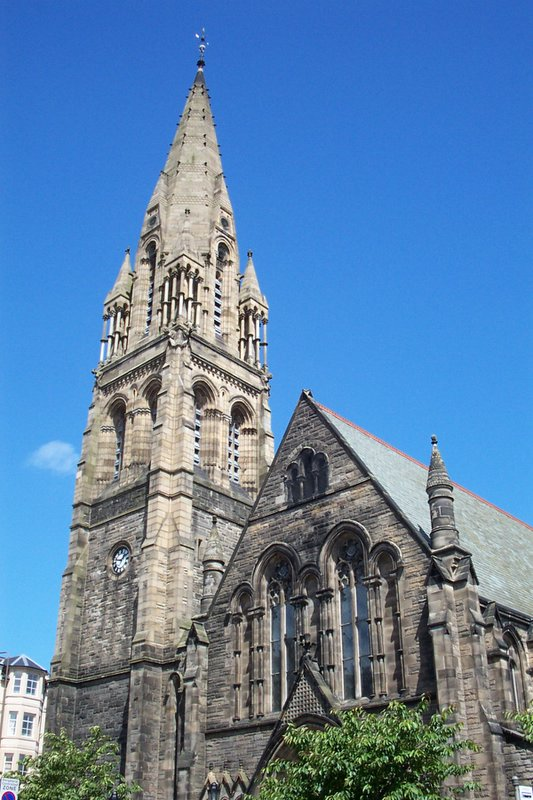
- Newington Trinity Church
- Denomination: Church of Scotland
- Website: www.newingtontrinity.org

Administration
- Parish: Newington Trinity

Newington Trinity Church, formerly Mayfield Salisbury Church and Mayfield North Church and also informally known as Mayfield Church, is a parish church of the Church of Scotland. It is located in the Newington district of Edinburgh, approximately 1.5 miles (2.4 km) south of the city centre. The building was designed by Hippolyte Blanc, with construction taking place between 1875 and 1879. Extensive renovations were carried out in 1969 following a major fire which destroyed most of the roof. The building is noted for the range and quality of its stained glass. The present congregation is the product of several mergers, most recently of Mayfield Salisbury Church with Priestfield Parish Church and Craigmillar Park Church in 2025.

== History ==
The congregation of what was then known as Mayfield Free Church was established in 1875 to serve the growing population of the Newington district of Edinburgh. Services were initially held in a school room in Minto Street, but a site for a permanent building was found soon afterwards at the corner of St. Andrew's Terrace (now part of Mayfield Road) and West Mayfield. The site was obtained "on favourable terms" from the landowner, Duncan McLaren, who was the local member of parliament.

Following a competition, plans for the design of the church were submitted by Hippolyte Blanc, these being accepted in January 1876. A start was made almost immediately on the building of the church hall, which was completed in December of that year.

On 5 October 1878, a commemorative stone for the main building was laid by the Lord Provost, Sir Thomas Boyd. At that point, construction was well under way. A time capsule, containing copies of that day's newspapers, a sketch plan of the church and other documents, was embedded in the stone. According to The Scotsman, there had been no difficulty in financing the work. The £1,300 cost of the hall had been raised by the time of its opening, with half of the estimated £8,000 needed for the main church building being raised by the time of the stone setting. The church opened in 1879.

Mayfield Free Church became Mayfield United Free Church in October 1900, following the amalgamation of the Scottish United Presbyterian Church and the Free Church of Scotland. It became part of the Church of Scotland in 1929, at which point its name was changed to Mayfield North Church.

In 1958, Mayfield North Church was amalgamated with the Fountainhall Road Church. The combined church was originally called Mayfield and Fountainhall Church, but the name was simplified to Mayfield Church in 1968. Fountainhall Road Church traced its origins to the Bethel Chapel in the High Street, founded in 1828. It met at various sites in the city before the construction of its own building on the south side of Fountainhall Road in 1897. After the merger with Mayfield North Church, the Fountainhall Road building was demolished and Newington public library built on the site.

In 1968, the church hall was greatly extended, with a large new entrance hall erected between it and the main church building. On 11 January 1969, the church's roof was destroyed by a major fire which also caused extensive damage to the building's interior. This resulted in lengthy and costly repairs, during which services were held in the newly extended hall.

In 1993, Mayfield Church merged with Salisbury Church. Salisbury Church was itself the result of several earlier mergers. Its building on the corner of Grange Road and Causewayside was erected in 1863. At that time, it was known as the United Presbyterian Church; it changed its name to Salisbury Church in 1959. The building is now in retail use but much of its interior decoration can still be seen. Since 1992, it has been designated by Historic Environment Scotland as a Category B listed building.

In 1998, the Mayfield Church building was extended to provide offices, a meeting space and a day care centre.

In January 2025, the parish merged with the parishes of Craigmillar Park and Priestfield with the Mayfield Salisbury site being selected as that of continuing worship.

== Architecture ==
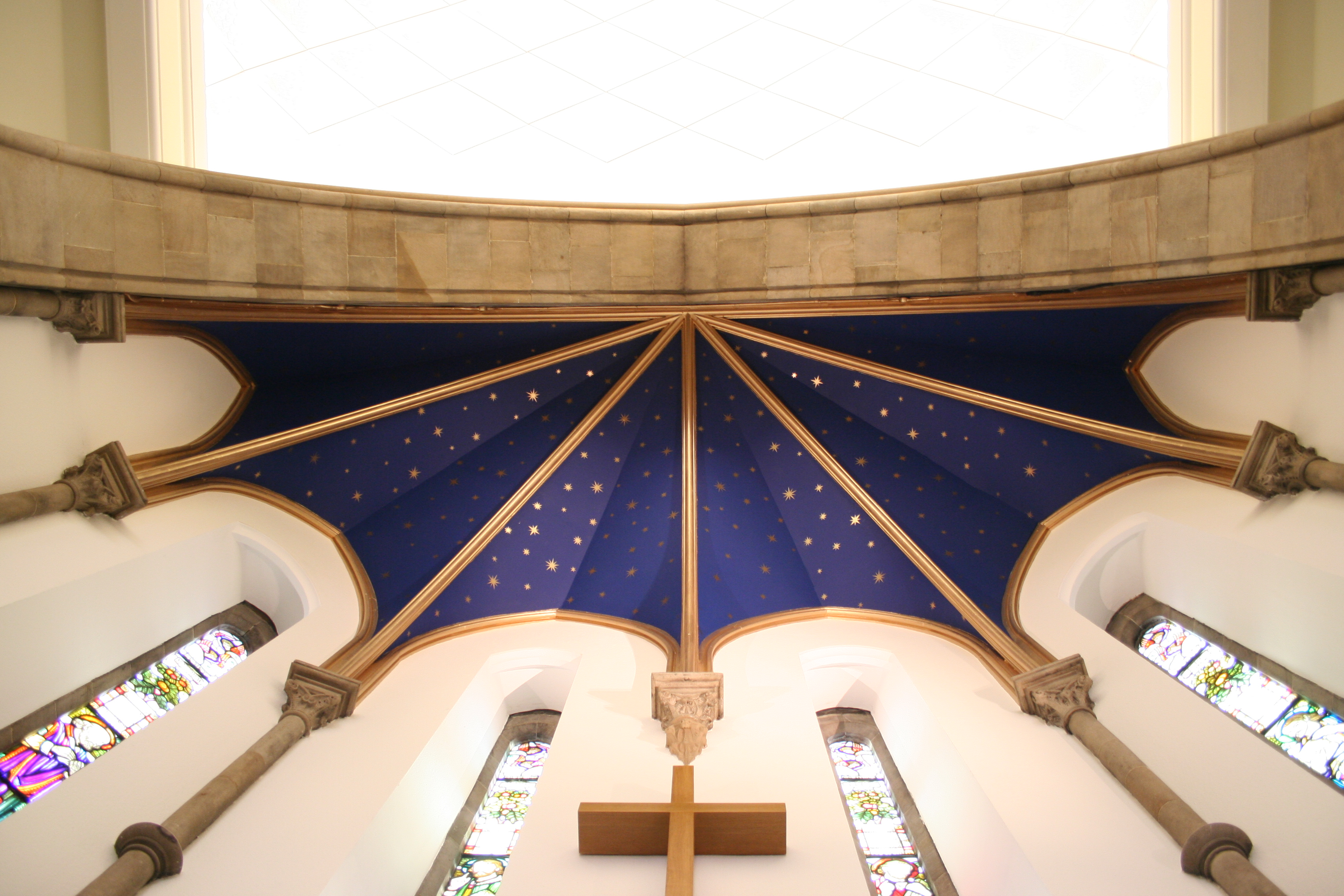
The chancel arch and apse ceiling

The church was designed by Hippolyte Blanc in the French Gothic style. It has been described as one of his finest buildings.

It has a cruciform plan, with the entrance and vestibule at the west end and a long nave leading into a short five-sided apse in the east. The transepts to the north and south are double-gabled. The nave is 88 feet (27 m) long by 42 feet (13 m) wide, including the aisles on either side. There is a long barrel-vaulted plaster roof, which is a "simplified simulation" of the original timber roof destroyed in the 1969 fire. There are a number of notable stained glass windows depicting biblical scenes and allegories. These escaped damage in the 1969 fire.

From the outside, the most prominent feature is the square clock tower, to which a stone spire with shafted pinnacles on each corner was added in 1894.

The building was designated a Category B listed building by Historic Environment Scotland in 1970.

== Notable Ministers ==
- Very Rev William J. G. McDonald DD (1924–2015) minister of the church from 1959 to 1992. He was Moderator of the General Assembly of the Church of Scotland in 1989. He was a presenter of Thought for the Day on Radio Scotland for many years under the name of Bill McDonald.
- Very Rev James A Whyte (1920–2005) minister of the church 1954 to 1958. He later became Professor of Practical theology and Christian ethics at St Mary's College, the divinity faculty of the University of St Andrews. He served Moderator of the General Assembly of the Church of Scotland from 1988 to 1989.

== Present ==
As at 2022, the church's congregation stands at approximately 450. Since January 2021, the minister has been the Rev Dr Sandy Forsyth. The church holds three services of worship on most Sundays as well as various other activities. From September to June, the church choir provides music for Sunday worship and other services. The choir is made up of amateurs and a small group of choral scholars and is led by Walter Thomson.

== See also ==
- List of Church of Scotland parishes
