= Longmore House =

- Historic Environment Scotland
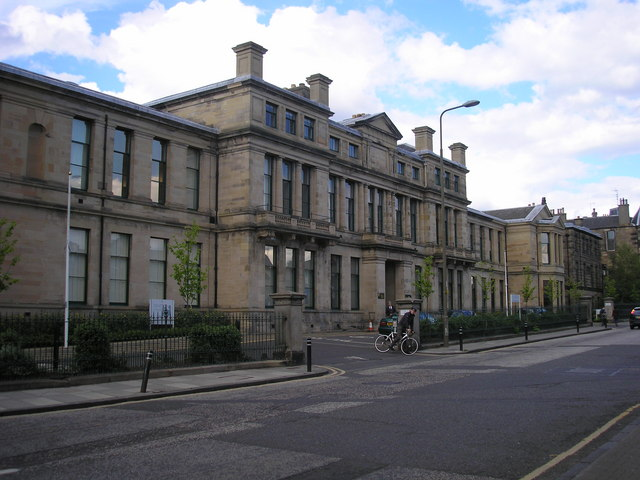
- Longmore House, the head office of Historic Environment Scotland.

- Shown in Edinburgh

Geography
- Location: Edinburgh, Scotland, United Kingdom
- Coordinates: 55.93739°N 3.17929°W

Organisation
- Care system: NHS Scotland

History
- Founded: 1875
- Closed: 1991

Links
- Lists: Hospitals in Scotland

Longmore House, formerly Longmore Hospital, on Salisbury Place, Newington, Edinburgh, is the headquarters of Historic Environment Scotland. The property is designated a Category B listed building.

== History ==
The hospital has its origins in a facility commissioned by the newly-formed Edinburgh Association for Incurables which opened in Salisbury Place in 1875. The trustees decided to rebuild the facility, financed by a bequest from John Longmore and using a neoclassical design by John More Dick Peddie: the new building was completed in December 1880. A new East Wing was opened by the Duke of York and Princess Mary in 1891 and the West Wing was completed in 1899.

In 1903 the Edinburgh Association for Incurables received a royal charter and, after the Liberton Hospital opened in 1906, the two hospitals together became known as the Royal Edinburgh Hospital for Incurables. The hospital joined the National Health Service in 1948.

After services were transferred to the Western General Hospital, the hospital closed in 1991. The building was converted to offices for Historic Scotland in 1994 and, since 2015, has been occupied by its successor organisation, Historic Environment Scotland.

== See also ==
- List of hospitals in Scotland
