= Craigmillar Park Church =

Coordinates: 55°55′6.39″N 3°14′12.59″W

- Craigmillar Park Church
- Denomination: Church of Scotland
- Churchmanship: Reformed
- Website: www.craigmillarpark.org

Architecture
- Heritage designation: Category B listed building

Administration
- Parish: Edinburgh New Town

Craigmillar Park Church serves Edinburgh's Newington area, in Scotland. It was a congregation of the Church of Scotland until 23 June 2024. The church building dates from 1879 and the adjacent hall was added in 1899.

== Building ==
Although the church is without tower or spire, the building is situated on the busy main north – south route stretching from east end of Princes Street through Newington towards Liberton. Craigmillar Park Church is adjacent to the Royal Blind School, where the minister is Chaplain. Within the garden is a memorial to people from the parish who gave their lives in the First World War.

== History ==
The building was originally known as Mayfield Parish Church until the Mayfield Free Church (now known as Mayfield Salisbury) rejoined the Church of Scotland. To differentiate between the two churches, North and South were added to the congregation names.

The present congregation is the result of a voluntary union of the former Craigmillar Park and Mayfield South congregations in 1966. Worship is currently held in the Mayfield South Building, which adopted the name of the former Craigmillar Park Church. The aforementioned Craigmillar Park Church, originally a Free Church congregation, opened in 1899, before becoming Buchanan House, part of former St. Margaret's School, in 1976. Following the school's closure, it has now become the Iqra Academy (mosque). As of July 2010, there are 266 members of Craigmillar Park Church.

On 11 June 2019 the Rev. Alex McAspurren was inducted as minister of both Craigmillar Park Church and Reid Memorial Church, the two churches having been linked by the Presbytery of Edinburgh the previous year.

On 23 June 2024 the church held its final service as a Church of Scotland congregation. A new parish, Newington Trinity, was formed with Mayfield Salisbury and Priestfield Churches, with the Mayfield Salisbury building being selected as the continuing place of worship.

== Organ ==
The organ is a three manual pipe organ dating originally from 1892. The congregation uses Church Hymnary 4th edition, occasionally supplemented by songs and hymns from other resources.

== See also ==
- Church of Scotland
- List of Church of Scotland parishes
