= St Columba's Catholic Church, Edinburgh =

Coordinates: 55°56′12″N 3°10′43″W

St Columba's Church
- St Columba's Roman Catholic Church, Edinburgh
- St Columba's Church
- Denomination: Roman Catholic
- Website: http://www.stcolumbasrcedinburgh.org.uk/

History
- Dedication: St Columba

Administration
- Province: St Andrews and Edinburgh
- Archdiocese: St Andrews and Edinburgh
- Deanery: City of Edinburgh

Clergy
- Archbishop: Leo Cushley
- Priest: Fr Kevin Douglas

St Columba's Church, Edinburgh is a Roman Catholic church located in the Newington district of Edinburgh, Scotland.

== History ==
The foundation stone of the church was laid on Easter Tuesday 23 April 1889 and it was officially opened on Sunday 17 November of that year. The building was designed in the classic Renaissance style by Rhoderic Cameron. Notable features include a collection of statues in the window niches. The presbytery and hall were added by Reginald Fairlie, 1927. It is a Category B listed building. A two-manual pipe organ by Matthew Copley was installed in 1997.

== Parish organisation ==
From 2017 the parishes in Edinburgh were organised into clusters to better coordinate their resources. St Columba's is one of four parishes in Cluster 4 along with St Peter's, Sacred Heart and St Mark's.

The Edinburgh Group of the Ordinariate of Our Lady of Walsingham meet in St Columba's.
