= East Suffolk Park =

Former student residence in Edinburgh, Scotland

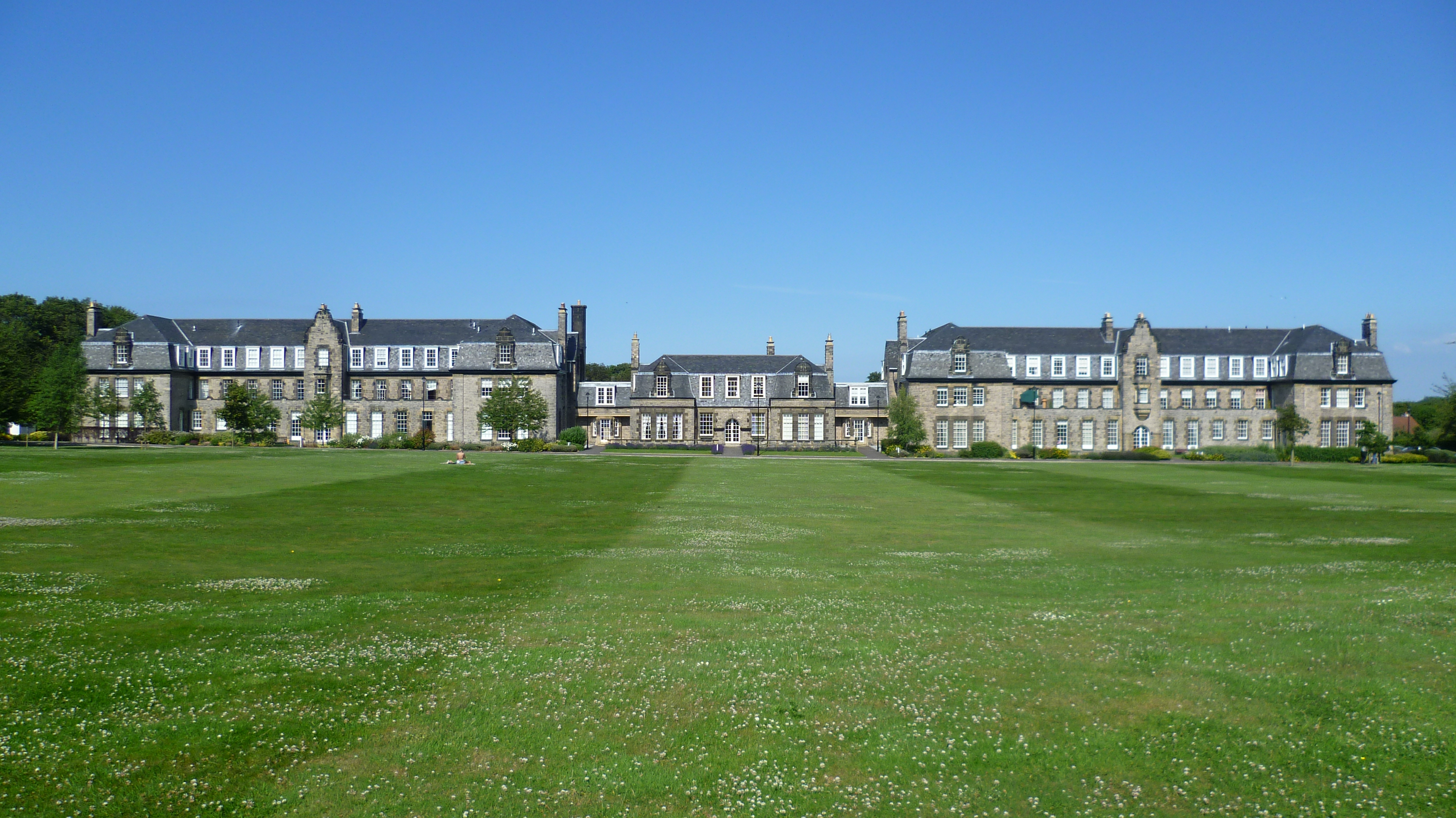
- Former Suffolk Road Halls of Residence
- Former names: Suffolk Road Halls of Residence

General information
- Type: Student residence
- Architectural style: Arts and Crafts
- Location: Edinburgh, Scotland
- Coordinates: 55°55′46″N 3°09′56″W
- Completed: 1916
- Renovated: 2003
- Owner: Taylor Woodrow

Design and construction
- Architects: Allan Keith Robertson, Frank Wood

East Suffolk Park, the former Suffolk Road Halls of Residence, is a B-listed quadrangle of buildings set around a large central grassed area in the Newington suburb of Edinburgh, Scotland. It was originally built as hostel accommodation for women students attending the University of Edinburgh and the Edinburgh Provincial Training College. Designed by Allan Keith Robertson in the Arts and Crafts style, the first two hostels, Balfour House and Buchanan House were opened in 1916. The third, Playfair House was opened one year later. The last two buildings, Carlyle House and Darroch House, which completed the quadrangle, were designed by Robertson's successor Frank Wood and opened in 1927. In 1939 the complex became an internment camp for enemy aliens and in 1940 handed over to the Auxiliary Territorial Service. It later became the Newington Campus of Moray House Teacher Training College. The complex was subsequently sold and converted to private residential accommodation.

== History ==
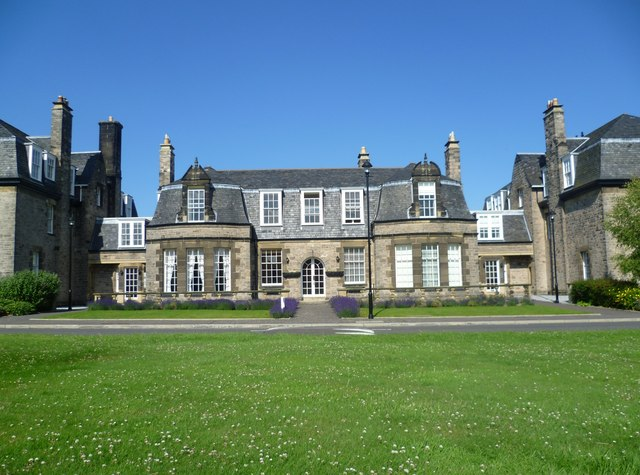
Former administrative block, East Suffolk Park

The land on which East Suffolk Park now stands was previously owned by Sir Robert Gordon-Gilmour, who lived in nearby Inch House. In 1877 the land, known at that time as Mayfield Park, was leased to Hibernian Football Club who played their matches there and, after a brief move away, returned to play there again in 1879. The land was later leased to the 9-hole Craigmillar Park Golf Club which had moved to a new site on Blackford Hill in 1907. In the early years of the 20th century, as the numbers of female students increased at the University of Edinburgh and the Edinburgh Provincial Training College (later Moray House College of Education), the need for new hostel accommodation for women was recognised. To address this the Edinburgh Association for the Provision of Hostels for Women Students was established and was chaired by Professor Sir Richard Lodge, Dean of the Faculty of Arts.

In 1913 this association bought around 19 acres of land, which included the former Mayfield Park, from Sir Robert Gordon-Gilmour.

The purchase of land for the hostel site was made possible by a grant from the Carnegie Trust.

== Architecture ==
The architect selected was Alan Keith Robertson (1881–1925), architect to the Scottish Education Department. Thomas Swann, (1883–1925), Robertson's partner in the firm, had previously worked with Sir Robert Lorimer and the new halls of residence were designed in the Arts and Crafts style popularised by Lorimer. The three halls had mansard roofs and were grouped around a large grassed quadrangle, similar to the design of campus buildings at McGill University, Montreal designed by another Scottish Lorimer trainee, Percy Erskine Nobbs. The design was 3-storey, symmetrical, 15-bay U-plan block. with the first and second storeys recessed. The front and side elevations were constructed from stone from Craigleith Quarry and the rear elevations finished in brickwork and harling.

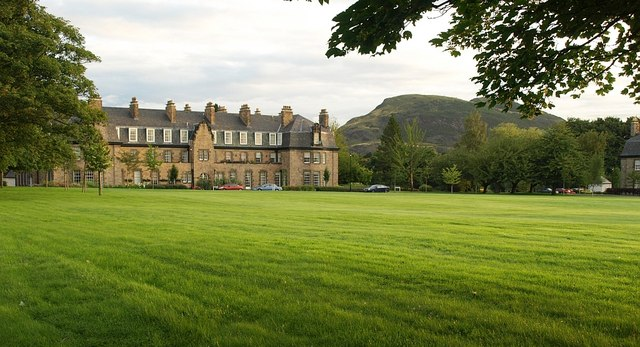
East Suffolk Park, Edinburgh, with Arthur's seat in background

Initially three hostels were constructed with accommodation for 156 students. Each hall had a large dining room, common room and library. In addition tennis courts and hockey pitches were provided. The first two hostels were occupied in October 1916. They were named Balfour House after Arthur Balfour, 1st Earl Balfour who was the Chancellor of Edinburgh University and Buchanan House after the Buchanan family – philanthropist donors to the arts. The third building opened in 1917 was named Playfair House after the Playfair family, which included John Playfair, professor of mathematics and his nephew William Henry Playfair, the Edinburgh architect, who designed buildings in Edinburgh in the Greek revival style which led to Edinburgh's description as the 'Athens of the North'.

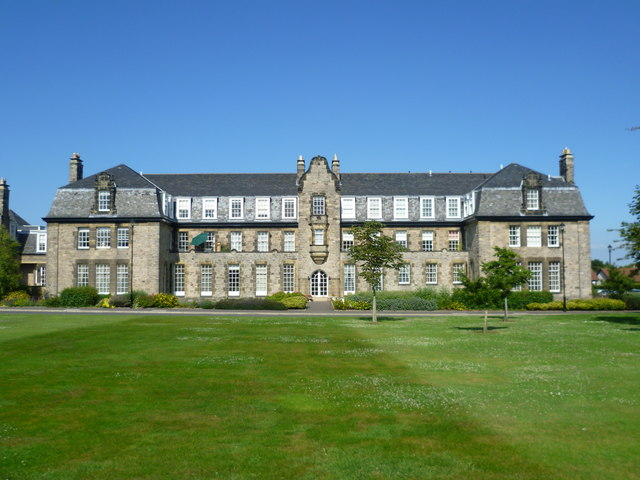
Former Darroch House, East Suffolk Park

Two more halls, which were linked, were built on the east side, completing the quadrangle. These were designed by Robertson's assistant and successor Frank Wood. They had a slightly different specification so that there were no coal fires in the bedrooms and therefore no chimneys were necessary. They were completed in 1927 and named Carlyle House after Thomas Carlyle the essayist and historian and Darroch House after Prof Alexander Darroch, Professor of Education at Edinburgh University.

== Wartime use ==
In 1939 the hostels were taken over by the War Department and became an internment camp for what were termed enemy aliens. These were local people of German birth and German merchant seamen who had been detained at British ports. The internment camp closed in 1940 and the hostels were taken over as accommodation for the Auxiliary Territorial Service (ATS) officer cadets.

== Subsequent use ==
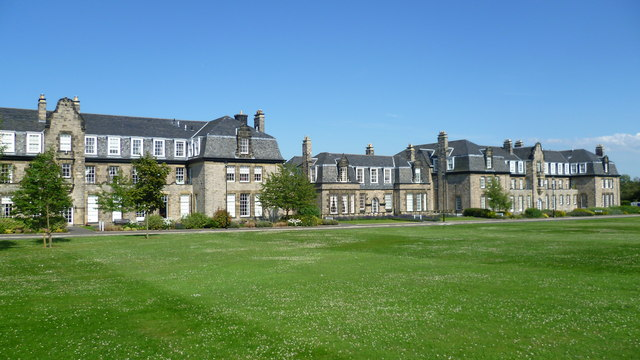
Former Carlyle and Darroch Houses, East Suffolk Park

The hostels reopened as student accommodation in 1945 and became the Newington Campus of Moray House Teacher Training College. This closed in 1997 when the college amalgamated with the University of Edinburgh to become the Moray House School of Education and Sport. The complex was sold to Miller Homes in 1998 and then sold to Taylor Woodrow in 2003, with Miller Homes retaining the playing field and sports pavilion. The complex was renamed East Suffolk Park and became private residential accommodation.

The buildings were given B listing in 1974.
