= Prestonfield, Edinburgh =

Area of Edinburgh, Scotland

Coordinates: 55.933472°N 3.161428°W

Prestonfield: Scottish Gaelic: Iomair an t-Sagairt
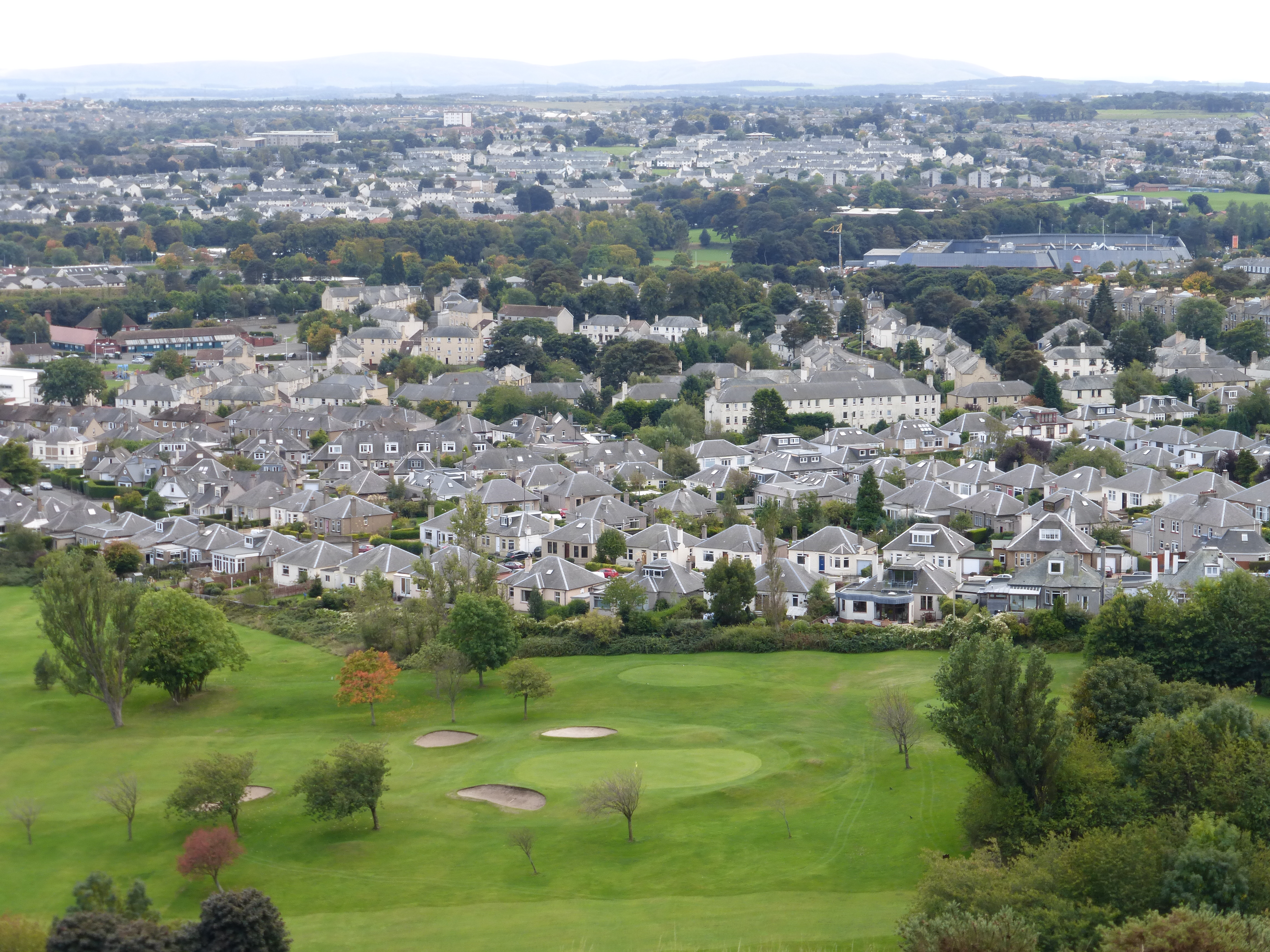
- Prestonfield from Arthur's Seat

- Location within the City of Edinburgh council area Location within Scotland
- OS grid reference: NT275717
- Council area: City of Edinburgh
- Lieutenancy area: Edinburgh
- Country: Scotland
- Sovereign state: United Kingdom
- Post town: EDINBURGH
- Postcode district: EH16
- Dialling code: 0131
- Police: Scotland
- Fire: Scottish
- Ambulance: Scottish
- UK Parliament: Edinburgh East
- Scottish Parliament: Edinburgh Southern

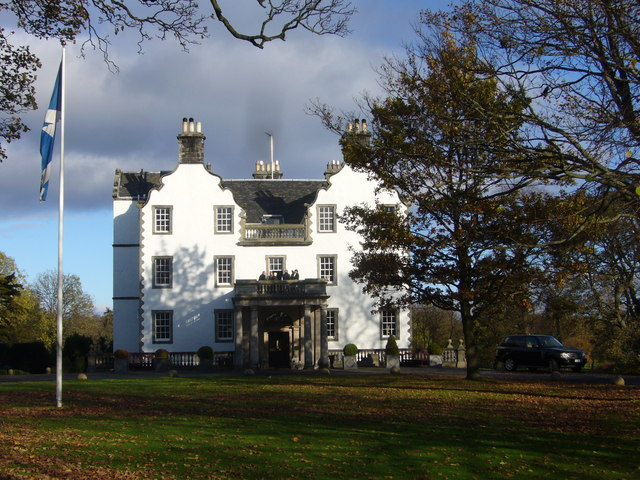
Prestonfield House

Prestonfield (Scottish Gaelic: Iomair an t-Sagairt, lit. 'the priest's field')is a primarily residential suburb in the south of Edinburgh, the capital of Scotland. It lies to the east of the A7 road, as it leaves the city centre, approximately 3 miles south of the centre. It is best known as being home to Prestonfield House, a renowned hotel, and Prestonfield Golf Club. The golf course is the nearest to the city centre. The area was developed with housing in the interwar period with a series of private bungalows by James Miller and others alongside a council estate designed by Adam Campbell and built under City Architect Ebenezer J MacRae.

It lies west of Duddingston and is bounded on its west side by Newington Cemetery. Cameron Toll lies to the south. Pollock Halls of Residence and the Commonwealth Pool lie to the north.

The area was known as Priestfield until the late seventeenth century, a name retained by some institutions and street names and revived by the parish church in 1975..

The area is visually dominated by Arthur's Seat and Salisbury Crags to the east, which tower above the area.

== Notable Buildings ==
- Prestonfield House - Now a hotel
- Cameron House (1770) for the Dicks of Prestonfield
- Priestfield Parish Church (1880)
