= Priestfield Church =

Church of Scotland parish in Edinburgh

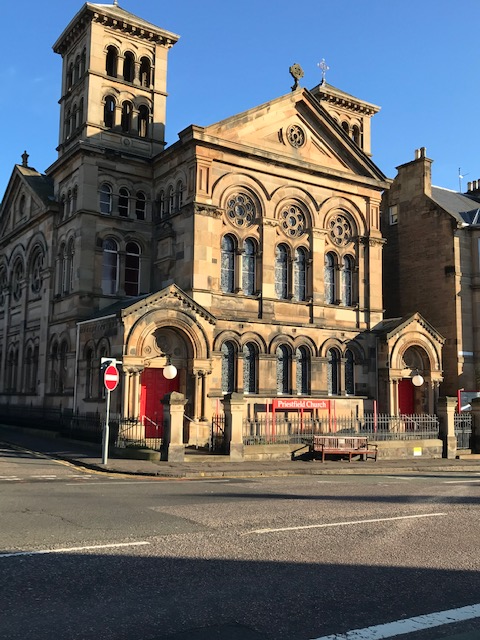
- Priestfield Church
- 55°56′11″N 3°10′09″W
- Denomination: Church of Scotland
- Churchmanship: Reformed
- Website: www.priestfield.org.uk

Architecture
- Heritage designation: Category A listed building

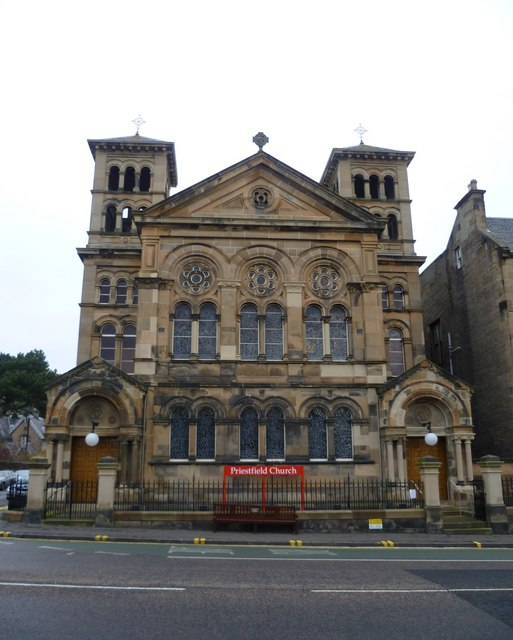
Priestfield Church, Dalkeith Road - geograph.org.uk - 2168613

Priestfield Church is a church building of the Church of Scotland in Edinburgh. It is in the presbytery of Edinburgh. It is located approximately 1.5 miles (2.4 km) south of Edinburgh city centre on Dalkeith Road at its junction with Marchhall Place. The church building was completed in 1880 and is now a category A listed building.

== History ==
It was founded in 1879 as a United Presbyterian congregation by members of the Newington United Presbyterian church (later Newington South church, later still Salisbury church) at the corner of Grange Road and Causewayside. It opened for worship in December 1880 as Rosehall United Presbyterian Church. In 1900 the building passed to the United Free Church, becoming known as Rosehall United Free Church. The congregation joined the Church of Scotland in 1929 with the building becoming Rosehall Church of Scotland. The church united with Prestonfield Church in 1975 and became known as Priestfield Parish Church, taking the name from the nearby Priestfield Road. The building was given grade A listed status in September 1991. In 2025, the parish was merged with that of Mayfield Salisbury and Craigmillar Park to form the new parish of Newington Trinity based in the formed Mayfield Salisbury Church.

== Architecture ==
It was designed by James Sutherland and James Campbell Walker, in a distinctive Italianate style. There are twin square campanile towers each over an entrance portal facing onto Dalkeith Road. The style is Lombardic Romanesque, with the main church behind the Dalkeith Road elevation and church hall and vestry forming the rear of the building. A notable feature are the rose stained glass windows."auto The double light windows below these were commissioned as a war memorial in 1921 by Sir John Cowan, in memory of his youngest son, Lt. William Morison Cowan, who died in WW1. They were designed by Alexander Strachan, Douglas Hamilton and Mary Wood. The organ is by James Jepson Binns of Sheffield and dates from around 1900.

== Activities ==
The church holds Sunday worship services for the local congregation and a Korean congregation. Activities throughout the week include prayer groups cubs, scouts and brownies. The Prestonfield food bank is located in the church.
