= Blackford =

Blackford might refer to:

== People with the surname ==
- Charles Minor Blackford (1833–1903), American lawyer
- Hosea Blackford, a fictional character in books by Harry Turtledove
- Ian Blackford (born 1961), Scottish politician
- Inger Mewburn (Inger Blackford Mewburn, born 1970), Australian academic
- Isaac Blackford (1786–1859), American judge and politician
- Katherine M. H. Blackford (1875-1958), American pioneering writer on human resources
- Liam Blackford (born 2004), Australian cricketer
- Richard Blackford (born 1954), English composer
- Russell Blackford, Australian writer, philosopher, and critic
- Steven Blackford (1977–2004), American wrestler

== Places ==
Australia

- Blackford, South Australia

United Kingdom

- Blackford, Cumbria, England
- Blackford, Somerset, England
- Blackford, Sedgemoor, Somerset, a village in Wedmore parish
- Blackford, Edinburgh, Scotland
  - Blackford Hill
  - Blackford Pond
- Blackford, Perth and Kinross, Scotland

United States

- Blackford, Kentucky
- Blackford County, Indiana

== Other uses ==
- Blackford Oakes, the fictional protagonist in a series of books by William F. Buckley, Jr.

== See also ==
- Baron Blackford
- Blackford High School (disambiguation)
