= Fridel Meyer =

British kayaker (1904–1982)

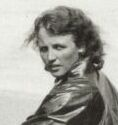
- Meyer in 1933

Personal information
- Full name: Fridel Engert; Fridel Halling-Day
- Citizenship: British
- Born: 4 February 1904; Kitzingen, Bavaria, German Empire
- Died: 17 December 1982 (aged 78); Harrogate, North Yorkshire, England
- Resting place: Grove Road Cemetery, Harrogate
- Occupations: Car mechanic; shop owner

Sport
- Country: Germany
- Sport: Kayaking
- Long-distance kayaking: River Main, Bavaria, to Westminster, 1932; British coast, 1933 and 1934

Fridel Meyer (4 February 1904 – 17 December 1982) was a German kayaker who was born in Kitzingen, Bavaria. She publicly retained her maiden name for kayaking events after marrying Edward Engert, but later used the name Fridel Dalling-Hay after marrying a second time. She made two failed attempts at the circumnavigation of the United Kingdom, but clocked up an informal 1933 women's record for long-distance sea-kayaking after paddling to Montrose from Westminster.

Meyer's first anticlockwise circumnavigation attempt in 1933 ended with a car accident and injury near Montrose, and the second clockwise attempt in 1934 was curtailed by bad weather in the English Channel. However, after she died a myth arose that she had been the first to complete a circumnavigation of the UK. That myth was corrected in 1989, but nevertheless it persisted in the media for some decades after that.

Following the circumnavigation attempts, Meyer was imprisoned as an alien during the Second World War under Defence Regulation 18B, and held in Holloway Prison for around six months until she was released under the evidence of barrister Norman Birkett. She gave up canoeing events, and lived for most of the rest of her life in Harrogate, West Riding of Yorkshire, where she and her second husband Glen Dalling-Hay renovated the former Empire Theatre and ran a pram shop.

== Background and character ==
Although Fridel Meyer was born in Bavaria, she said in 1934 that her parentage was Tyrolean, and that she spent much of her early life in the Tyrol. Fridel Meyer's grandfather was a lifeguard at the swimming pool in Kitzingen, Bavaria, Germany. Although she gave her birth year as 1908, Fridel Meyer was born on 4 February 1904, in the same town on the River Main, and her grandfather trained her in watersports. "Her father was a sea captain and an able engineer and taught her how to use spanners on engines". However he did not approve of her 1933 UK coastal voyage, saying, "It is scandalous".

In October 1931 in Knaresborough, Meyer married a British man of German extraction, Edward Joseph Engert (born 1909), (Note: GRO index: Births Jun 1909 Engert Edward Joseph Knaresborough 9a 103.) who was "in the hotel trade". (Note: GRO index: Marriages Dec 1931 Engert Edward J. and Meyer Fridel, Knaresbro' 9a 222.) However, as a kayaker she used her maiden name and was erroneously called a Fräulein by the English newspapers. Before she started on her first long-distance paddle up the British coast, she was observed in London:

a slip of a girl who seemed quite unconcerned by the general notice she was attracting. She was wearing light grey trousers, blue shirt open at the neck, and a rakish grey sombrero. Her arms, bare to the elbow, were tanned to the colour of ebony. At her heels trotted a chow. The fact that she stopped once or twice to inquire the way showed she was a stranger to London.

When Meyer reached Aberdeen, The Scotsman described her:

A pretty, flaxen-haired young lady, speaks almost perfect English. She was very modest when her adventures were referred to. They had not been so very wonderful, she said. But the scenery of the Scottish coasts and the hospitality she had received had more than repaid her for her hardships.

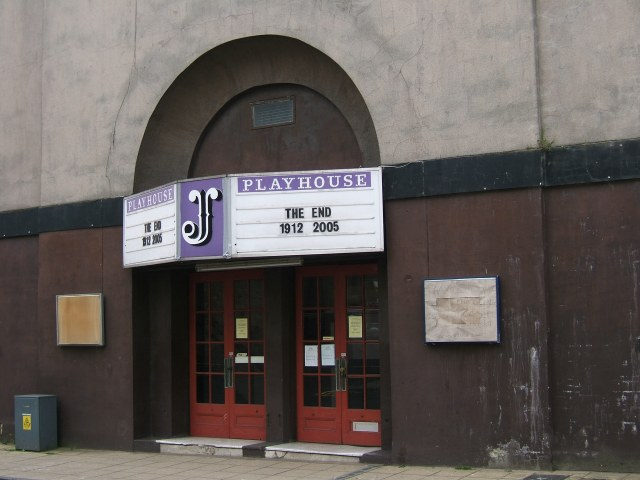
Berwick Playhouse, where Meyer spoke for peace

Meyer spoke for peace, too. Interviewed in 1933 on the stage of Berwick Playhouse, she said,

I want the English people to know that we Germans want to be friends. We are of the same race, and the same blood runs in our veins. It is ridiculous that we should ever hate each other. We young people did not make the War, and our fathers only did their duty to their Governments. It is much wiser to start a new, clean peace.

== Canoeing ==
In 1932, having trained in kayaking, Meyer kayaked from Bavaria, via the Main and Rhine, the North Sea's coastline, Belgium, Calais, the English Channel and River Thames to Westminster, London. She had come as a student, to learn English. By the time she was making a second attempt at circumnavigating Britain, she had already clocked up 10,000 miles (16,000 km) of canoeing, and newspapers were reporting that she was a long-distance sea-kayaking record-holder for women.

=== Challenge ===
In 1933, Meyer read some news in The Wide World magazine, which she took as a challenge to a race. John Nolan, a Londoner of Irish extraction, aged 37 years, intended to canoe around the British Isles on his own. He would start from Westminster on 3 June 1933, "and break the long distance sea kayak record" (it is possible that there was a previous such record already held by a German). Nolan was an experienced canoeist, having used an open canoe on the Mississippi River in 1928, from Canada to Winona. However, he chose a single folding kayak, also known as a folbot or folboat, for the UK circumnavigation; and it was a craft with which he had had little experience. On 2 June 1933, the day before he planned to set off, Meyer published in The Daily Express that she would attempt to break the record for Germany. She had been in training, but she too was unfamiliar with the folding kayak; she had so far owned one for a single day. She was only 24 years old, she said, and 1.5 m (4.9 ft) tall.

=== Equipment ===
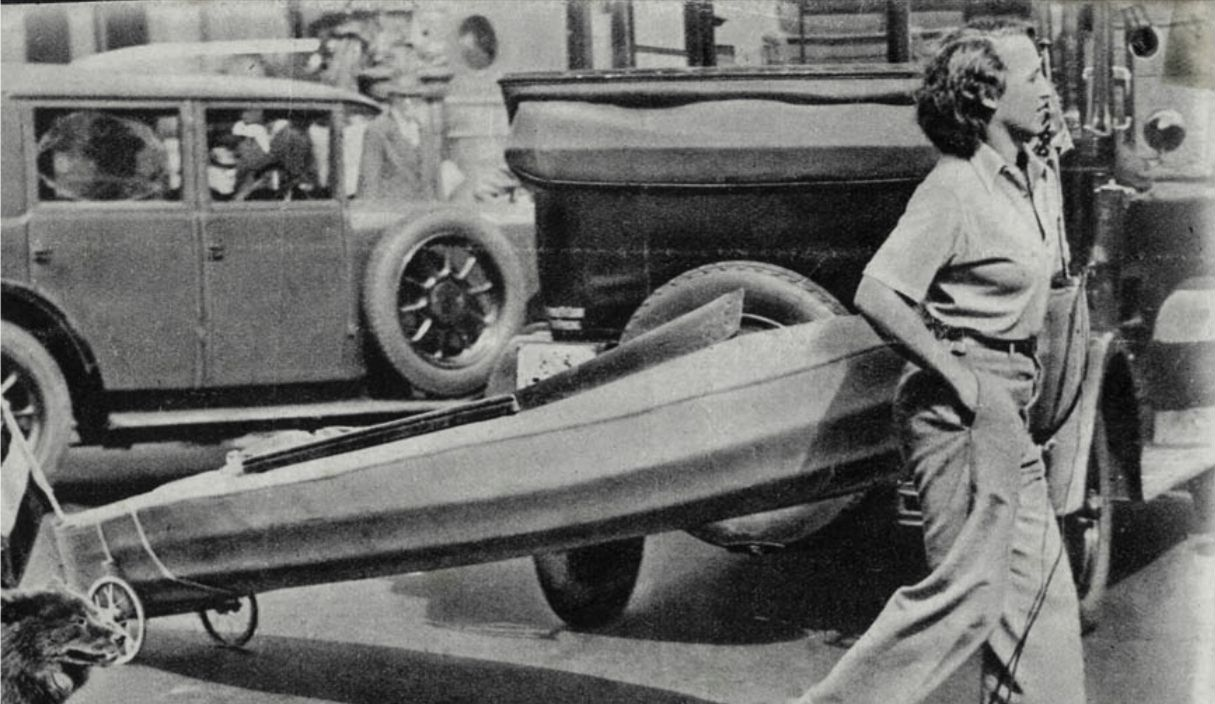
Meyer with her canoe, 1933

Meyer had to sell her violin to pay for a new £12 (equivalent to £1,076.08 in 2023) kayak suitable for the challenge, but it was just a kayak, with no sail, no radio, no lifejacket and no rudder for the sea, and no trolley for the land. She named her new Folbot single folding kayak Stella Maris, after Our Lady, Star of the Sea, and it carried the painted words, "Folboating round the British Isles". The kayak was 14 ft (4.3 m) in length, by 2.5 ft (0.76 m) in width, with a cockpit of 54 by 25 inches (137 cm × 64 cm) covered with a spray deck of canvas. It was British-made, coloured blue, and flew the black-white-and-red German flag. By 1934 her flag had been stolen seven times. Unladen, the kayak weighed around 55 lb (25 kg). She used an 8-foot (2.4 m) paddle, and carried two compasses. At Sunderland a reporter checked out her canoe, and reported that she carried only "a small primus stove, a thermos flask, a map, and a tiny four-yards sail, used only when absolutely essential".

=== Dog on board ===
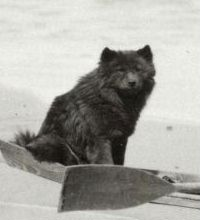
Wuffles

From the moment of casting off in June 1933, Meyer paddled with her Chow Chow Wuffles in the canoe. Although Wuffles was photographed sitting on top of the canoe, the dog usually travelled lying below the spray deck. His formal name was reported to be Wu Pei Fu, which the newspapers said was the contemporary Chinese warlord Wu Peifu's name, meaning (according to the newspapers) "respect demanding friend". (Note: The Chinese characters for Wu Peifu are 吳佩孚. In Mandarin, the first one, Wu, can represent both a surname and the southern Jiangsu area. The second character, pei, means "respect". The third character, fu, means "to trust". The newspapers variously referred to the dog as "it", "he" or "she". The dog is referred to in this article as "he" for consistency.) The dog was an added liability for Meyer, in that he would waste time by escaping to chase wildfowl and rabbits; on the other hand he fed media publicity and served as a security alert while camping. There was some talk of the dog having been "presented to her when she won the world's canoeing record", but she already possessed him when she began her first circumnavigation attempt in June 1933.

=== Meyer's first UK circumnavigation attempt, 1933 ===
Although Meyer saw this event primarily as a race, Nolan saw it mainly as a long distance sea kayak record attempt, and some newspapers attributed this intention to Meyer too. Nolan published his diary of his record attempt in The Wide World in 1934. Meyer kept no diary, but The Express, considering that Meyer's apparent youth and frailty pitted against British seas was newsworthy, followed her progress with some interest. Thus although the two competitors were lone canoeists, the public has been given a view of both sides of "the first kayak race around the UK". At places visited during the voyage, Meyer gave lectures about her journey in local theatres, for the Gaumont-British Picture Corporation.

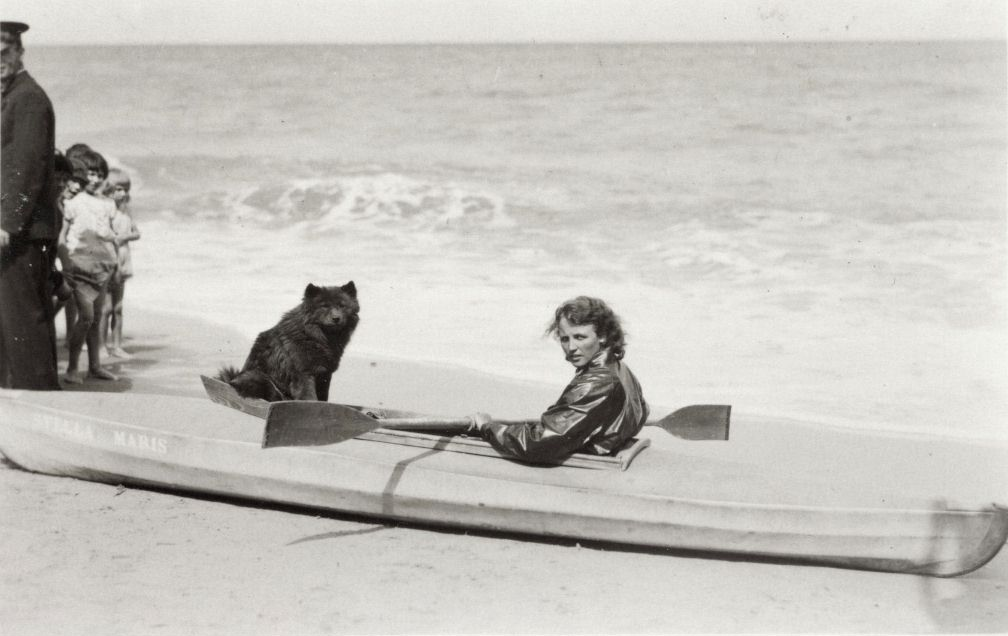
Meyer starting out from Westminster, 1933

When the race started on 3 June 1933 at Westminster, "a big crowd gave a rousing send off". Meyer and Nolan had their photographs taken, Nolan started off in his canoe, then Meyer "cheekily" waited for half an hour to give him a "head start", (although the Leeds Mercury reported that Meyer started first). A brief film was made of Meyer's start along the river, with her dog in the kayak. The Northern Whig stated that Meyer's "only provision [was] a supply of milk chocolate" and that the estimate for the duration of the circumnavigation at that point was "over four months".

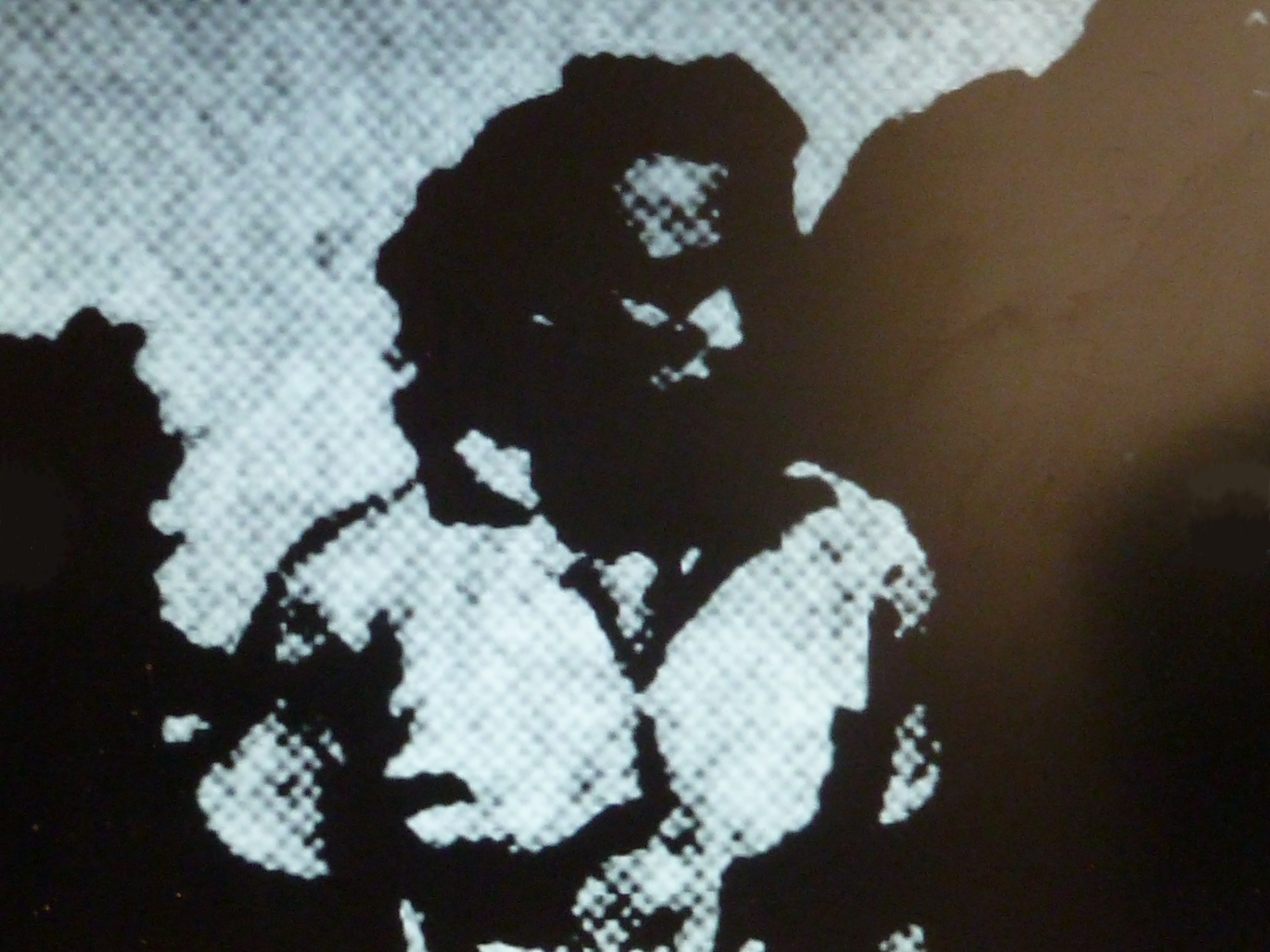
Meyer being led away from Shoeburyness by W.D. Constabulary

Meyer and Nolan intended an anticlockwise circumnavigation of the British Isles, This was to be a challenge in the North Sea, with frequent wind-against-tide conditions, and paddling upwind. They were paddling and camping separately. It took them four days to travel 50 miles (80 km) downriver and reach the Thames Estuary and Shoeburyness. Shoeburyness was a military firing range in constant operation at that time, so that was the one occasion when they teamed up and camped side by side, for safety reasons. They were nevertheless arrested for spying, but not before they had secured their kayaks and rung the newspapers for help. The newspapers informed the British Army of the race, they were promptly released, and the resultant publicity was favourable to them both.

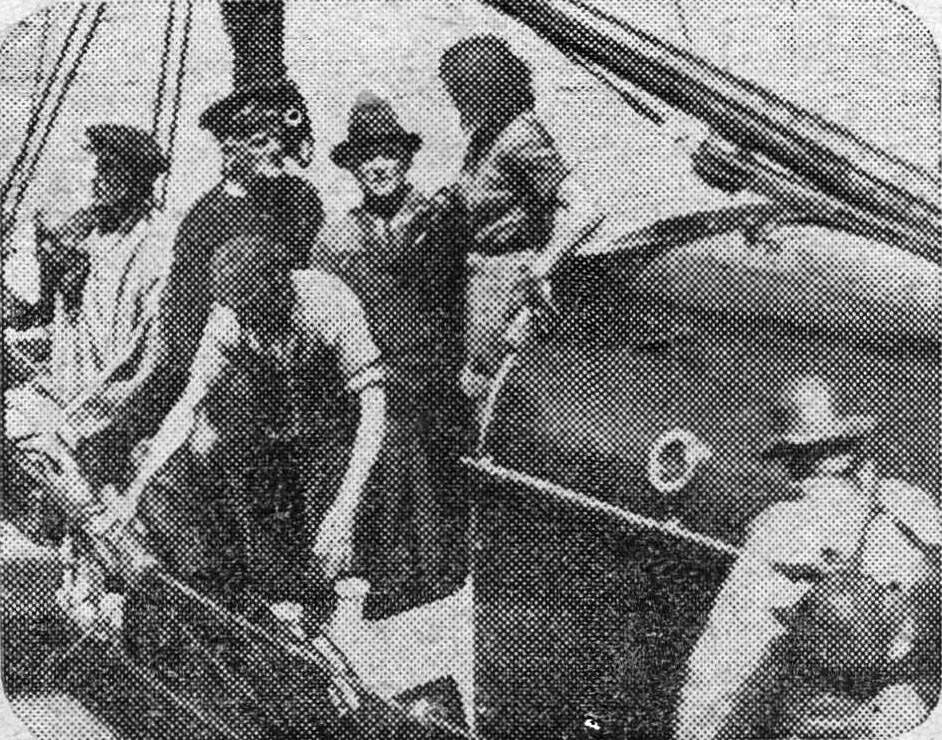
Meyer stands on the deck of the Agnes Cross after the rescue

Meyer arrived at Clacton-on-Sea on 16 or 17 June. On 21 June while she was paddling from Southwold to Lowestoft, "a gale was blowing with a heavy sea". Meyer's husband Engert attempted to join her at sea, but capsized. His canoe was "stove in and submerged", and he had to be rescued by Meyer, who carried him lying across the bows of her canoe, while the dog swam in a lifebelt for 45 minutes. She tried to paddle to shore, but could not make headway. By the time Engert was picked up by the Lowestoft coast guard, he was "in a state of collapse [and] hanging on to the outside [of Meyer's canoe]". Later, the Lowestoft crew and launchers of the lifeboat Agnes Cross were rewarded with a sum of money for the rescue, by the RNLI. The Daily Mirror gave a slightly different version of the story:

They were caught in the swell, and Engert's canoe capsized. The girl knew he was a poor swimmer. He was some distance away, and with great difficulty the girl went to his rescue. She threw her inflated rubber cushion to Engert and then recovered his water-logged canoe. She took the painter between her teeth, and towed the canoe to Engert. 'I shouted at him in the hope of rousing him', Fraulein Meyer said afterwards. 'At last I succeeded in gripping him by his clothes and hoisting him on the back of my boat'. She tied a flag to her paddle and waved it to get attention. The lifeboat saw her signals, and went out and rescued them. They were cheered by holidaymakers on the pier as they came in, and Fraulein Meyer kissed the coxswain.

Engert's identity as Meyer's husband was hidden in reports of this incident, due to Meyer's wish to use her maiden name. Subsequently Engert's contribution to the race was land support only. Engert was not only providing accommodation and clean, fashionable clothing; he was organising financially-advantageous publicity, including the fiction that Meyer was an unmarried young girl. The publicity included events, saleable souvenirs and newspaper articles.

After the rescue, Meyer "spent two days in hospital", saying later, "I lost my voice through shouting" and took a while to "recover it properly". By the time she reached Mundesley, after 150 miles (240 km), Meyer was "exhausted" by the North Sea wind, tide and surf, and lost several days by stopping to rest. Off Blakeney Point, she and the dog met a 20-strong school of seals. The dog barked and Meyer was "scared stiff". She said "I paddled for my life and said a prayer [but] eventually lost sight of them". She paddled on to Sheringham for a strawberry tea provided by fishermen, then continued on to Brancaster, piloted in by the coastguard. On 10 July she reached Mablethorpe. She left Mablethorpe for Saltfleet on 11 July, watched by "hundreds of spectators".

At Mundesley, Nolan had overtaken Meyer, having done 215 miles (346 km) and reached Hunstanton. However he paddled to Kings Lynn instead of crossing The Wash, he was held up by publicity events in that town, and by the time he was ready to proceed he was overpowered by "bad weather. and rough seas", and was rescued by a fishing boat while being overtaken by Meyer. Nolan tried to catch up, but reached Cleethorpes and took three days to repair his boat and rest, before rounding Spurn Head. Meanwhile, Meyer had reached the 310 miles (500 km) mark at Hornsea on 19 July, accepted a pleasure flight from local pilots, crash landed into a hedge, suffered concussion, and was still continuing the race. The injury caused by the accident delayed the next stage of Mayer's journey, which would take her to Bridlington. At Bridlington, "still suffering from slight concussion" from the plane crash, Meyer said that she was "120 miles ahead" of Nolan. She changed into "a long dress of red silk, a beret, and sandals", and "had difficulty forcing her way through [the crowd which met her] to the Harbour Master's office". The crowd then waited for two hours until she came out. She was welcomed formally by town representatives, then was joined by eleven wealthy German tourists, young men who entertained the crowd in their national costume, waving flags and singing. From Bridlington, a coble escorted her round Flamborough Head, due to its tide-rip. She passed Speeton, then got into broken water and a cross-tide at Filey Brigg. She had to land on the Brigg and wait for a motor-boat escort.

On 9 August, Meyer left Sunderland for South Shields. At that point she was averaging 18 to 20 miles (29 to 32 km) per day at sea. On the night of 19 August, between Holy Island and Berwick-upon-Tweed, "she was forced ashore on three occasions and compelled twice to jump into the water". Arriving at Goswick, she relaunched her canoe "with difficulty" paddled to Scremerston, and thence to Berwick. In spite of a westerly wind and a strong ebb, she landed at North Berwick on 1 September, to be met by "large crowds", then she continued to Leith, via Edinburgh. She crossed the Firth of Forth to Burntisland in one and a half hours, then carried on to Kirkcaldy, which she reached 83 miles (134 km) ahead of her own schedule.

At 350 miles (560 km) from the start, Nolan reached Clayton and had to stop for eight days due to illness. Between Scarbororough and Berwick upon Tweed he took only nine days to do 262 miles (422 km), having the support of a companion kayaker on that leg of the trip. He had reached the 500-mile (800 km) point from Westminster, but was frustrated, believing that winter weather would now stop him. His diary says, "I still had to pass Fräulein.(sic) ... It wasn't a race, but nevertheless I felt I ought to get ahead". Meanwhile, Meyer had reached Edinburgh, was leading the race by 160 miles (260 km), but had to stop for five days due to bad weather, and Meyer was formally welcomed at the Council Chambers by a baillie and councillor. On 6 September, she was greeted by a large crowd and Provost Kilgour at Kirkcaldy, and the next day, Meyer left Kirkcaldy for the 7-mile (11 km) paddle to Methil.

On 8 September, when she was about to leave Methil, a basket hoist dropped her dog 15 feet (4.6 m) into the water. He swam a long way, but was rescued by canoe, after which Meyer continued to Elie Breakwater, Anstruther and then St Andrews, which she reached on 9 September. Nolan had beat Meyer to Anstruther (the 575-mile (925 km) point) by fifteen minutes, by daringly crossing the open water of the Firth of Forth during a good-weather window. On 10 September she landed at Montrose 650 miles (1,050 km) from the start. Nolan was not far behind her, arriving at Ferryden, so within a few hours she set off paddling for Aberdeen with Nolan following. Bad weather and oncoming darkness forced Meyer to disembark at the north end of Montrose, storing her canoe there, while Nolan continued on voyage.

Meyer announced suddenly that she had to return to London, and set off in a car. On 13 September 1933 at Blackford on the Stirling Road, Meyer was involved in a car crash, and was admitted to Stirling Royal Infirmary with "severe injuries", otherwise described as a "fractured shoulder". She convalesced in North Yorkshire afterwards. This ended her part in the 1933 race, although she vowed to continue the following year. She had taken just over three months to paddle from Westminster to Montrose. Meanwhile in the same month of September 1933, Nolan paddled as far as Aberdeen, 670 miles (1,080 km) miles from the start, ending his trip due to illness. "He claimed to have beaten the long distance sea kayak record and vowed to in the future follow these kinds of adventures only in the newspaper". His diary said that, "he made no mention of why Fridel had abandoned her attempt, but acknowledged that taking everything into account the young lady put up a most creditable performance". Meyer's canoe remained in storage in Montrose until 1934. Even though Nolan had in effect won the 1933 long distance record for open-water kayaking or sea-kayaking, newspapers were still maintaining in 1934 that Meyer held that record. Nevertheless, she did hold that record for women.

=== Meyer's attempt to continue the UK circumnavigation, 1934 ===
On 8 June 1934, Meyer left London in what has been described as a second attempt to circumnavigate the UK in a canoe, this time going clockwise. From the Thames she would go south around the Kent coast, then west via the English Channel. In fact, the idea this time was not to paddle around Britain in one go, but to continue the voyage which was begun the previous year, i.e. to carry out the "second stage of her voyage round the coasts of the British Isles".

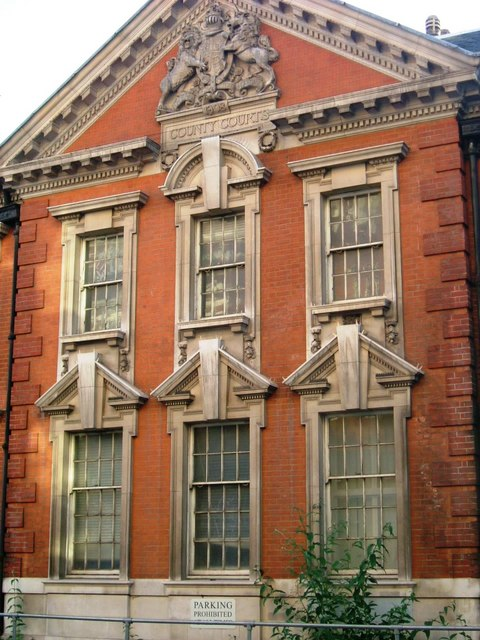
West London County Court house

However, the Press was losing interest in Meyer due to newspaper revelations that she was not the youthful and unmarried Fraulein Meyer of Express fame, but one Frau Engert whose reputation had possibly gained a whiff of scandal by reports of a case in West London County Court. In January 1934, Meyer's and her husband Edward Engert's former London lodger, Lieutenant-Commander James Pearson (retired). claimed £68 (equivalent to £6,097.79 in 2023) for goods that he had left at her property. Meyer counter-claimed for £21 5s (equivalent to £1,905.56 in 2023) for unpaid rent. Pearson claimed that he was not a lodger but that he had had an affair with Meyer, and he used his own love letters as evidence. Meyer and her husband denied any affair, and said that they had known about and ignored the love letters, and that in response Pearson had become unpleasant. Engert witnessed that, "Commander Pearson has terrorised my wife so much that I don't know what to do with her ... I have to hold her down at night when she screams. He has threatened both my wife and myself with death". Judge Kennedy concluded with a financial compromise, but he had seen Pearson's threatening letters. He said, "Jealousy can account for many things, and the contrast between the undying affection of 1933, and the hatred and abuse of January, 1934, is so great that it leads me to form the conclusion that Pearson was not a normal tenant".

Whether or not in consequence of a possible scandal, there was little Press coverage of Meyer's 1934 attempt, although it is known that her husband Engert organised events along the way as before, and Wuffles accompanied Meyer. She landed at Southend on 14 June, and was given a "wonderful reception" by a crowd of 5,000 on the pier. On 16 June she reached Sheerness to be greeted by another crowd, but her dog ran off and much time was spent in finding him. At that point in her voyage, she was already stating that, "it was her intention to travel along the South Coast and as far up the West Coast of England as she was able to do this season". From Sheerness she paddled to Whitstable and Margate. In Thanet Wuffles went missing for six days, and was found on the cliffs, having been frightened by a starting gun at a yacht race.

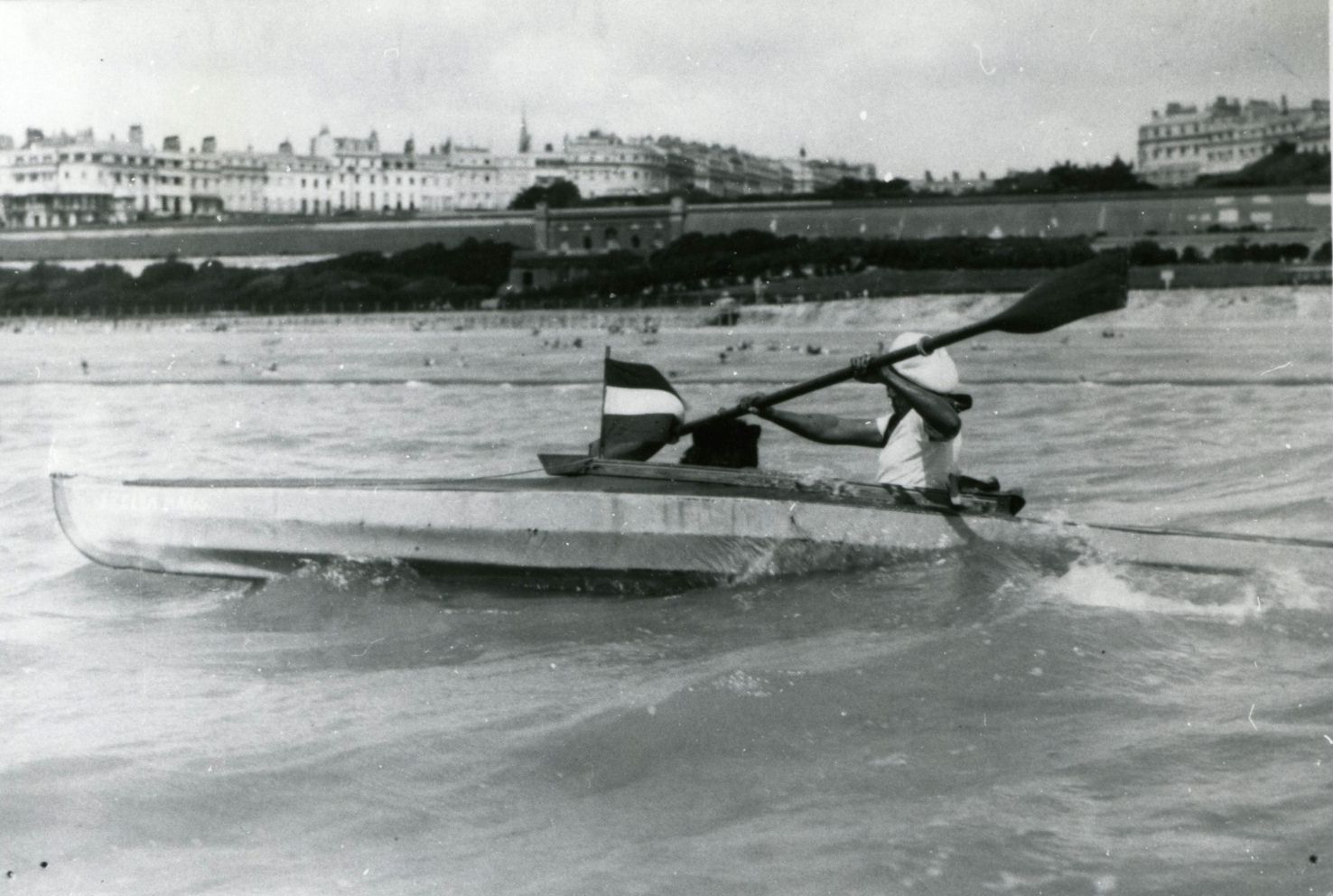
Meyer passing Brighton, 1934

Meyer paddled via Dover, Dymchurch and Winchelsea. On 25 July, she arrived at Hastings, daringly traversing through a shallow gap in the harbour wall, because the boat only "[drew] about an inch (2.5 cm) of water". She was greeted formally by Pier Company officials, in front of an applauding crowd. Wuffles temporarily went missing while rabbiting in Fairlight Glen. She landed at Worthing on 13 August, and set off west again the next day. To reach Southsea she had first to shelter from bad weather at Emsworth, then she had to make it to Southsea's South Parade Pier in spite of tides and currents which forced a route passing close to the Isle of Wight. At Southsea a crowd of holiday-makers gave her an "enthusiastic" reception. Meyer made it onto Movietone News in August 1934. When she left Southsea, a rival for the circumnavigation title, Croydon schoolmaster Ronald Cameron Bowie, left at the same time, and it was suggested that this was now a race. "Her tiny craft was nearly sunk in a squall between Southsea and Netley".

Meyer reached Weymouth in September, but rested before rounding Portland Bill. The Cornishman reported that she was ill, repairing her canoe, and "convalescing in her 120-year old Hungarian caravan on the slopes overlooking Weymouth Bay". (She had bought the horse-drawn caravan in Canterbury in July 1934). Bad weather arose, preventing her from rounding the Bill for two weeks. Even when she managed to round the Bill, the rough seas forced her to leave the dog onshore, and it was now 2 October. As she rounded the Bill, "the girl paddled her canoe strongly and with wonderful rhythm, and she was cheered when she passed the famous Channel Light ... darkness came on, and she landed at Fortuneswell". "Somewhere between Land's End and the Bristol Channel", Meyer gave up the project and went home.

=== Kayaking records and legacy ===
Meyer did not win the world record for long-distance sea-kayaking around Britain in 1933. Nolan did that. However she was close behind Nolan, and if Nolan won it for men, she won it for women, having paddled 1,200 miles (1,900 km) on that trip. During the 1933 event, coastguards were keeping "a close lookout" for her, "[using] flags to indicate possible landing places if necessary". (Note: Meyer kept a log book of her UK coastal voyages of 1933 and 1934, and asked coastguards to sign them at each of her stopping points.) Meyer said in 1934, "I gained the world's canoeing record for my journey along the English coast and for my travels along many of the principal rivers in Austria and Germany, and I have the distinction of being the first to cross the English Channel in a folbot". She also "established three records, being the first woman to cross the Wash, Humber and the Firth of Forth in a canoe". by 1936, Meyer was still "the only woman to cross the Channel in a canoe".

One offshoot of the race, and of other later events like it, was publicity for the folding kayak. In 1936, Meyer was invited to Wembley Pool to present a long-distance canoeing trophy to Frank M. Whittingham, who had "[crossed] the Channel and back in a folding canoe in the record time of thirteen hours, thirty-five minutes. By that year, canoeing was becoming popular, and folding canoes had become "common on the Thames", keeping a "small London factory continually busy".

=== Myth ===
Beside the fiction maintained by the Press in 1933 that the kayaker Meyer was a young, unmarried woman, another myth grew in later years that she had completed the circumnavigation of the United Kingdom. That story appeared in 1982, when the Harrogate Advertiser published her obituary under her married name of Fridel Dalling-Hay. Not long after that, her obituary was published in her German birth town of Kitzingen, repeating the same story. The Times journalist Simon Barnes was caught up in the fiction in 1983, writing that Meyer was "the first person to achieve this feat [of circumnavigating Britain by canoe]". For some years, that myth was repeated as fact, in the American magazine Sea Kayaker. The matter was investigated, and the true story was published in a 1989 article in the Sea Kayaker by Alan Byde. The Dalling-Hay family provided evidence of the true story to the Stadtarchiv in Kitzingen, and Thomas Theisinger again confirmed the truth in 2010.

However those publications of the true facts were not seen by all, and the myth persisted such that Harrogate historian Malcolm Neesam wrote in 2019 that Meyer had got to know her new country in 1933 "by undertaking a solo 2,500 mile circumnavigation of the island of Britain by kayak". It was repeated again in 2021 by journalist Thomas Barrett in the Harrogate news service, Stray Ferret: "Fridel Dalling-Hay ... became the first person in the world to circumnavigate the island of Britain in a canoe". One possible reason for the growth and persistence of this myth is that, following her second marriage, Dalling-Hay did not like to discuss her early days - which included political imprisonment - and assumptions were made.

== Return to private life ==
Following her second UK circumnavigation attempt in 1934, Meyer retired from canoeing events and had two daughters with her first husband, Engert. With Engert's family, Meyer co-ran, but did not own, Blean Motors - a scrap yard, a car repair business and a taxi service, at Whitstable, where she used skills learned from her father to strip and repair cars. However, following the advent of the Second World War in 1939, Meyer was imprisoned for approximately six months for being German, under Defence Regulation 18B. She shared a cell in Holloway Prison with one of the Mitford sisters. It was evidence from the barrister Norman Birkett which permitted her release. The British Government confiscated the taxi company.

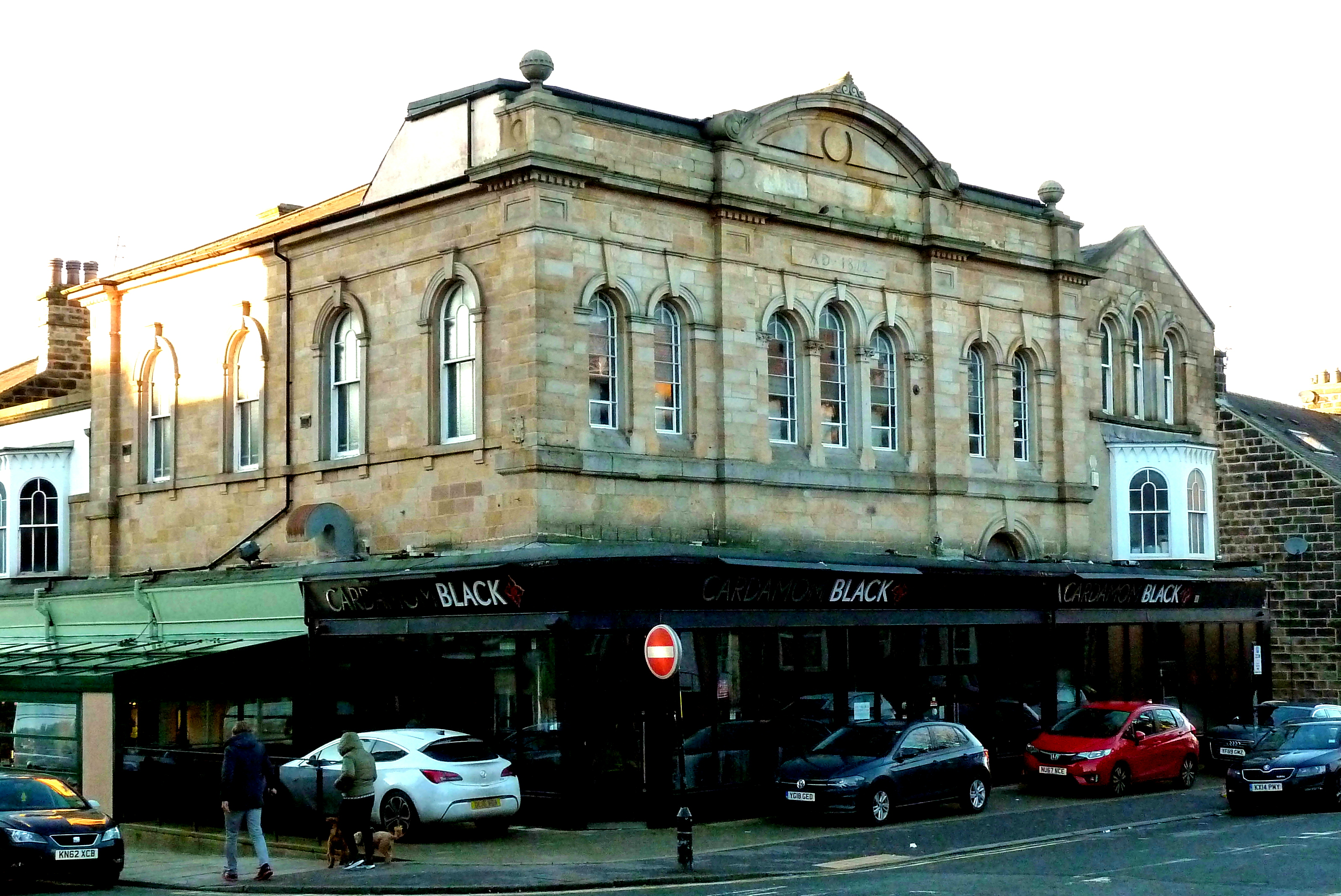
Former Empire Theatre building

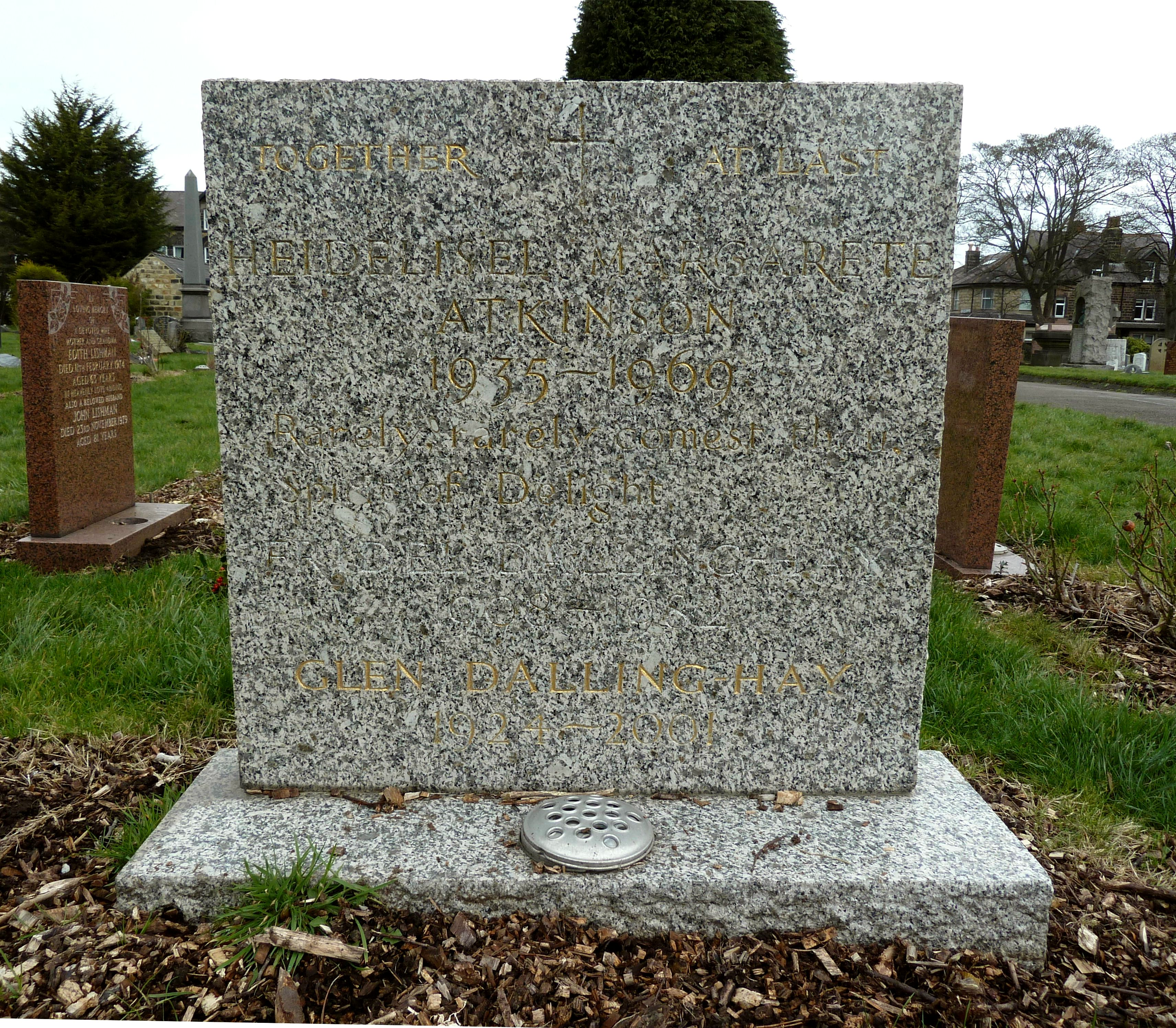
Fridel Dalling-Hay's gravestone

Meyer and Engert moved to Harrogate in the North Riding of Yorkshire, because after leaving prison she was obliged as a wartime alien to live more than 30 miles (48 km) from the British coast. In Harrogate they restarted their taxi business, but Meyer was then divorced from Engert.

In 1952 Meyer remarried to entertainer William G.G. "Glen" Dalling-Hay, (Note: GRO index: Marriages Sep 1952 Dalling-Hay William G.G and Meyer or Engert Fridel, Claro 2c 297.) and this time she publicly took her husband's name. Together with her second husband, Dalling-Hay restored Harrogate's old Empire Theatre building, at the junction of Cheltenham Parade and Mount Parade. She ran Beans Toy Shop in the building in the 1950s, rescuing broken perambulators from the town rubbish tip and rebuilding them for sale. In 1954, Dalling-Hay identified a police impersonator and thief in her pram shop, called the police, and the miscreant was arrested.

Dalling-Hay was diabetic, and towards the end of her life she was blind. She died at Harrogate Hospital on 17 December 1982, and is buried in Grove Road Cemetery, Harrogate. The gravestone carries the fictional birth date of 1908, which was created for her public persona when kayaking in 1933 and 1934. The former Empire Theatre still stands, and from 1 December 2011, the restaurant Cardamom Black has inhabited the building.
