= Max Hamburger =

German lawyer (1897–1970)

Max Hamburger (May 31, 1897 – February 3, 1970) was a German lawyer and legal scholar. He was the author of a definitive handbook of the German law on good will and fair dealing, Treu and Glauben in Verkehr.

Born in Kitzingen, Bavaria, Hamburger studied at the University of Würzburg and University of Heidelberg from 1918 to 1921, after having served as an officer in the German artillery during World War I. This service and a war medal saved the young Jewish lawyer's life in 1939, when he was released from the Dachau concentration camp and permitted to emigrate to England.

While in London, he researched ancient and legal philosophy. He moved to New York in 1948 to lecture at the New School for Social Research. He also lectured at Columbia University, retiring in 1967.

In addition to Treu und Glauben, his published books include Deflation und Rechtsordnung, The Awakening of Western Legal Thought and articles in scholarly journals. An Aristotelian scholar, he also authored Morals and Law; The Growth of Aristotle's Legal Theory. A contributor to the German Wiedergutmachung law, his papers are at the Leo Baeck Institute Archives, New York City.

== Sources ==
- Contemporary Authors, Gale, p. 199
- New York Times obituary, February 4, 1970
