= Kitzingen =

- Town
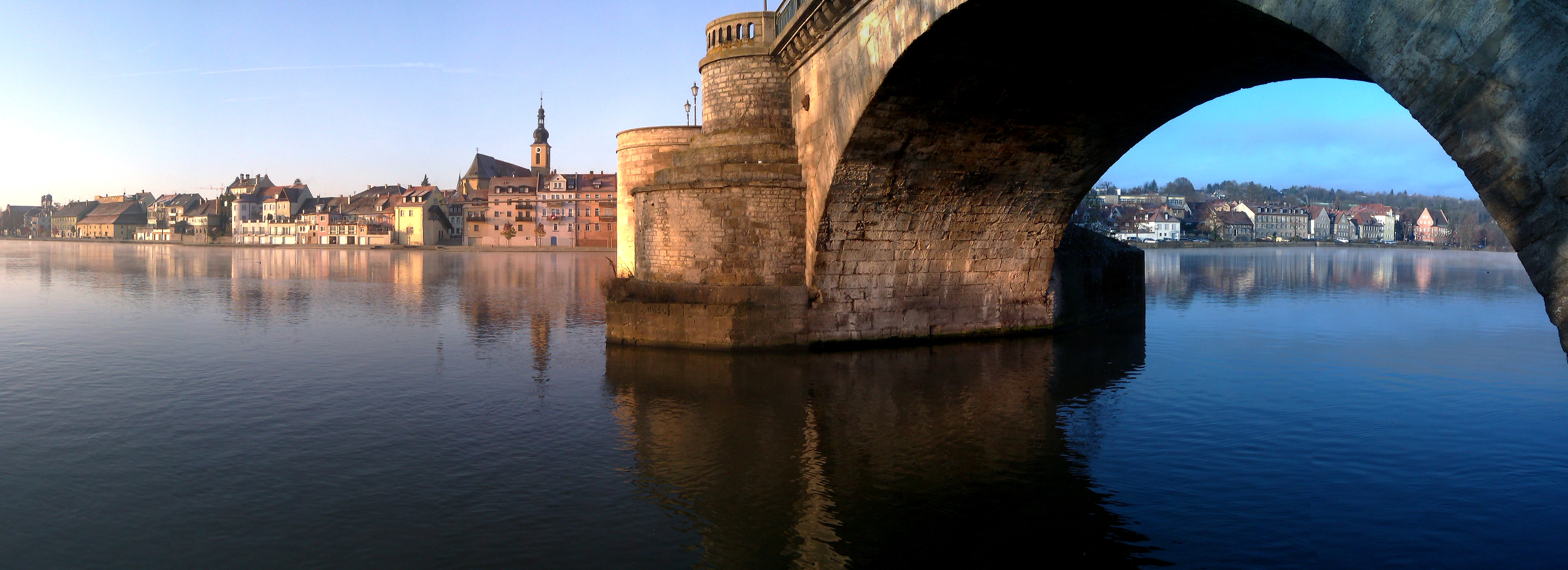
- Panorama of Kitzingen with Old Bridge on the Main River

- Coat of arms

- Location of Kitzingen within Kitzingen district
- Interactive map of Kitzingen
- Location within Germany Location within Bavaria
- Coordinates: 49°44′N 10°10′E
- Country: Germany
- State: Bavaria
- Admin. region: Unterfranken
- District: Kitzingen

Government
  - Mayor (2026): Dr. Enis Tiz (FW)

Area
  - Total: 46.99 km^{2} (18.14 sq mi)
- Elevation: 186–230 m (610–755 ft)

Population (2025-12-31)
  - Total: 23,028
  - Density: 490.1/km^{2} (1,269/sq mi)
- Time zone: UTC+01:00 (CET)
  - Summer (DST): UTC+02:00 (CEST)
- Postal codes: 97301–97318
- Dialling codes: 09321
- Vehicle registration: KT
- Website: www.kitzingen.info

Kitzingen (German pronunciation: [ˈkɪtsɪŋən]) is a town in the German state of Bavaria, capital of the district Kitzingen. It is part of the Franconia geographical region and has around 21,000 inhabitants. Surrounded by vineyards, Kitzingen County is the largest wine producer in Bavaria. It is said to be Franconia's wine trade center.

== History ==
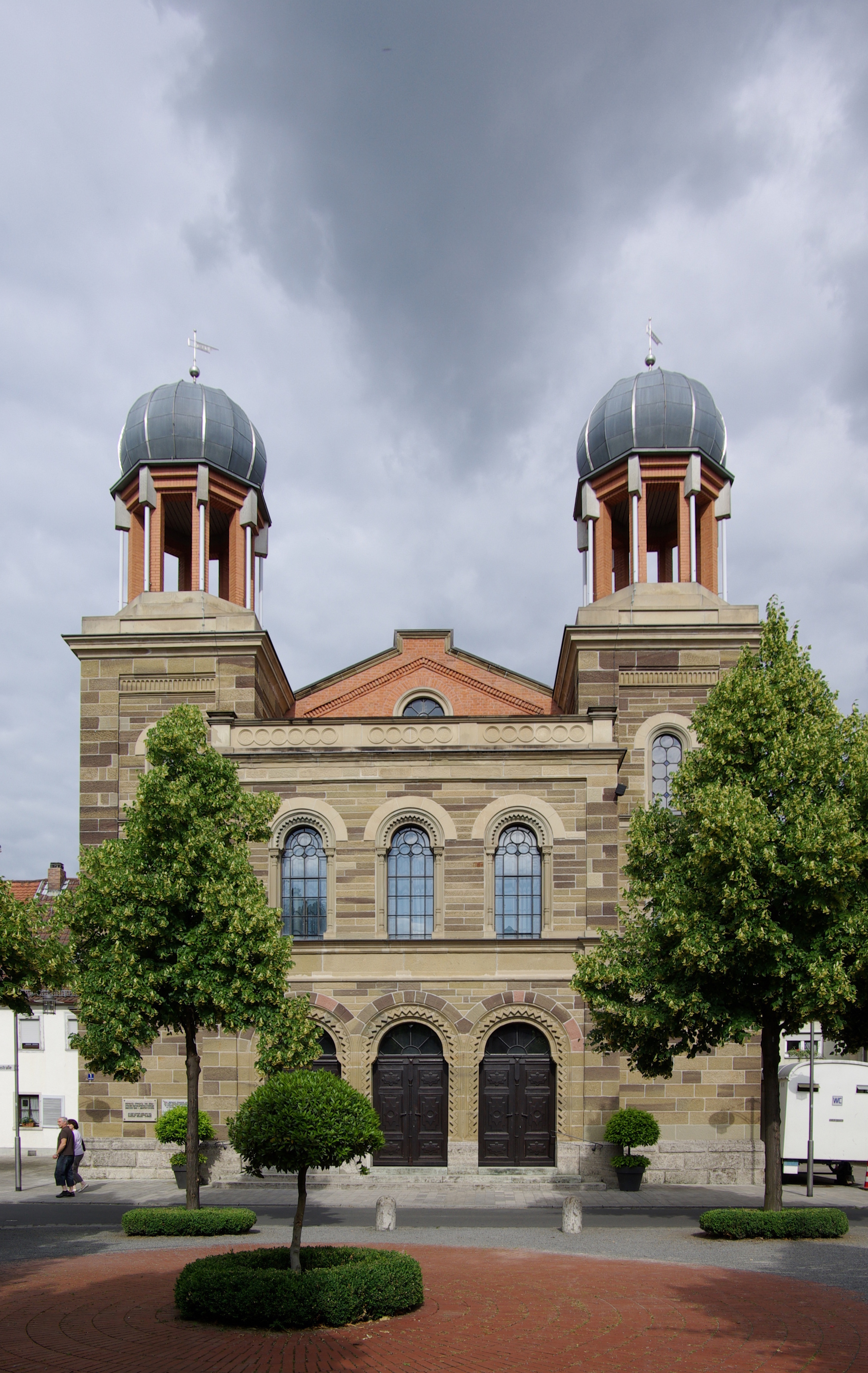
The Old Synagogue

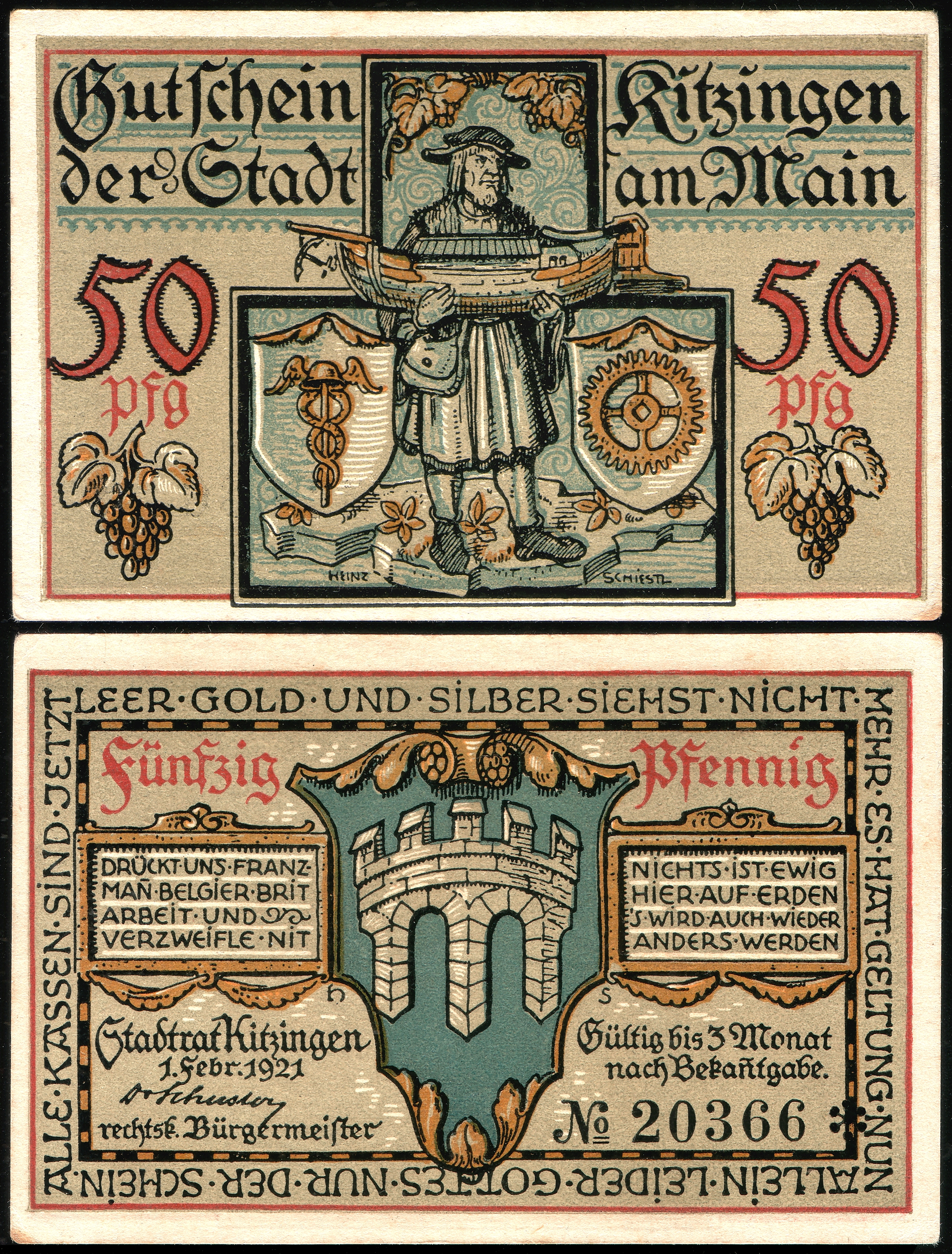
50 Pfennig Notgeld banknote of Kitzingen, designed by Heinz Schiestl, 1921

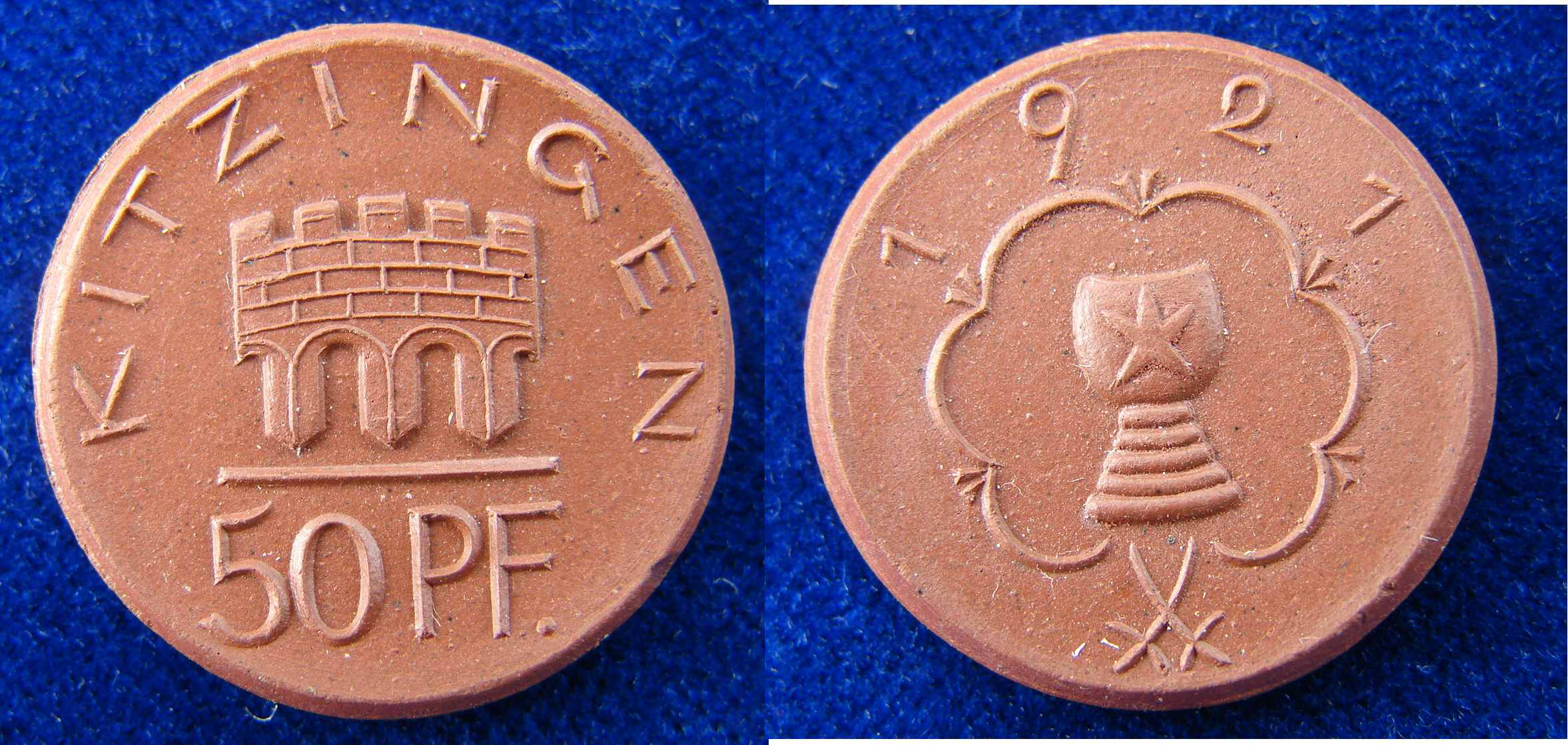
50 Pfennig Notgeld coin (emergency money) made of brown stoneware "Böttgersteinzeug"

According to legend, Kitzingen was founded when the Countess of Schwanberg lost her jeweled scarf while standing on the ramparts of her castle. The castle was located high above the fertile section of the Main Valley where Kitzingen now lies. The Countess promised to build a monastery on the spot where the scarf was found. When it was found by a shepherd named Kitz, she kept her word and built a monastery which she called Kitzingen. That Benedictine monastery, founded in the 8th century on the site of the present town of Kitzingen, defended the ford across the river Main.

Kitzingen's history is closely tied to Würzburg. Kitzingen became a free imperial city around the year 1000. During the next century the town changed rulers often, mostly being ruled by Würzburg prince-bishops who sold the town twice to fill their empty treasury.

In 1629, Prince-Bishop Philipp Adolf von Ehrenberg of Würzburg took up his option to repurchase Kitzingen after the Peasants' Revolt in 1525. He abolished Protestantism and forced more than 1,000 residents to leave the town. This blow to the town's strength was followed by the Swedish three-year occupation during the Thirty Years' War.

Kitzingen's revival is credited to the wisdom of Prince-Bishop Johann Philipp von Schönborn of Würzburg, whose Edict of Toleration in 1650 encouraged the return of the expelled Protestants. This is why both Catholicism and Protestantism are present in Kitzingen today.

The resulting prosperity carried Kitzingen through the 18th century as one of the most important ports on the Main. Kitzingen's life under the Prince-Bishops ended with the coming of French revolutionary armies and Napoleon.

In 1814 the Congress of Vienna confirmed Kitzingen's passing, along with the rest of the region, to the Kingdom of Bavaria.

During World War II Harvey and Larsen Barracks were both German military bases. The German Air Force used Harvey Barracks for an airport and they would flood the landing strip there when Allied forces would fly overhead. Below Harvey Barracks were multiple levels of hangars which still contain some German World War II aircraft. The hangars were booby-trapped by the retreating Germans close to the end of World War II. Tunnels were said to have been constructed by the Germans from the airfield out to the nearest highway, so that aircraft could be launched off the road to intercept allied planes. Because of the danger involved, no one had been inside the tunnels. In the late 1970s and early 1980s when the 2nd Brigade, Third Infantry Division was located there, private exploration companies offered to descend into those underground hangars and tunnels, but that idea was rejected for safety reasons. Again for safety reasons no one has explored those tunnels since World War II.

During the Cold War, Kitzingen was a staging area for the U.S. European Command's (USAREUR) air defenses against possible Soviet air and nuclear attack. Two U.S. Army Bases, Larson Barracks and Harvey Barracks, were located in the town. For many years it housed the 2nd Brigade of the Third infantry division. One of these battalions, 6-41 Field Artillery, as well as portions of other units including 2 platoons from the 1-15 Infantry Battalion, were deployed to Operation Desert Storm in 1990 and served with distinction. These units were eventually reflagged units of the First infantry division. On March 29, 2007, Larson Barracks and Harvey Barracks were handed back to the German government, with the move of the 1st Infantry Division back to the United States.

Marshall Heights Housing Area contained apartment houses for the majority of the American dependents. It included a commissary (later moved to Harvey Barracks), dependent schools for Grades Kindergarten - 8th Grade, and an AYA (American Youth Activities). High School students rode buses to Wurzburg American High School.

Since January 2007 there have been no more US Army personnel based in Kitzingen. Facilities are closed down and surveillance is discontinued.

== Geography and climate ==
Kitzingen has an oceanic climate (Köppen: Cfb; Trewartha: Dobk), the highest national temperature in Germany was measured at 40.3 °C (104.5 °F) on 5 July 2015, and was later exceeded by Lingen's 42.6 °C (108.7 °F) on 25 July 2019.

The Kitzingen weather station has recorded the following extreme values:

- Highest Temperature 40.3 °C (104.5 °F) on 5 July 2015 and 7 August 2015.
- Lowest Temperature −22.4 °C (−8.3 °F) on 8 January 1985.
- Wettest Year 858.6 mm (33.80 in) in 2002.
- Driest Year 407.8 mm (16.06 in) in 2003.
- Highest Daily Precipitation: 83.8 mm (3.30 in) on 16 July 2002.
- Earliest Snowfall: 17 November 1982
- Latest Snowfall: 11 April 1986

Climate data for Kitzingen (1991–2020 normals, extremes 1982–present)
Month	Jan	Feb	Mar	Apr	May	Jun	Jul	Aug	Sep	Oct	Nov	Dec	Year
Record high °C (°F)	17.0 (62.6)	20.4 (68.7)	25.6 (78.1)	32.9 (91.2)	34.0 (93.2)	37.4 (99.3)	40.3 (104.5)	40.3 (104.5)	33.5 (92.3)	29.0 (84.2)	22.1 (71.8)	18.3 (64.9)	40.3 (104.5)
Mean maximum °C (°F)	11.8 (53.2)	14.0 (57.2)	19.5 (67.1)	25.8 (78.4)	29.6 (85.3)	33.0 (91.4)	34.7 (94.5)	34.1 (93.4)	28.7 (83.7)	23.0 (73.4)	16.1 (61.0)	12.3 (54.1)	36.0 (96.8)
Mean daily maximum °C (°F)	4.2 (39.6)	6.1 (43.0)	11.0 (51.8)	16.7 (62.1)	20.9 (69.6)	24.3 (75.7)	26.4 (79.5)	26.2 (79.2)	21.0 (69.8)	14.9 (58.8)	8.4 (47.1)	4.9 (40.8)	15.4 (59.7)
Daily mean °C (°F)	1.4 (34.5)	2.1 (35.8)	5.8 (42.4)	10.3 (50.5)	14.6 (58.3)	18.0 (64.4)	19.8 (67.6)	19.4 (66.9)	14.7 (58.5)	9.8 (49.6)	5.2 (41.4)	2.2 (36.0)	10.3 (50.5)
Mean daily minimum °C (°F)	−1.6 (29.1)	−1.4 (29.5)	1.0 (33.8)	4.0 (39.2)	8.4 (47.1)	11.9 (53.4)	13.7 (56.7)	13.3 (55.9)	9.4 (48.9)	5.7 (42.3)	2.2 (36.0)	−0.5 (31.1)	5.5 (41.9)
Mean minimum °C (°F)	−11.1 (12.0)	−9.1 (15.6)	−5.7 (21.7)	−3.1 (26.4)	1.6 (34.9)	6.3 (43.3)	8.7 (47.7)	7.3 (45.1)	3.2 (37.8)	−1.2 (29.8)	−4.7 (23.5)	−9.2 (15.4)	−13.8 (7.2)
Record low °C (°F)	−22.4 (−8.3)	−21.6 (−6.9)	−20.2 (−4.4)	−7.8 (18.0)	−2.8 (27.0)	2.7 (36.9)	5.1 (41.2)	2.8 (37.0)	−0.8 (30.6)	−5.8 (21.6)	−14.0 (6.8)	−19.7 (−3.5)	−22.4 (−8.3)
Average precipitation mm (inches)	41.2 (1.62)	36.7 (1.44)	41.5 (1.63)	33.2 (1.31)	56.3 (2.22)	56.1 (2.21)	70.6 (2.78)	56.2 (2.21)	48.5 (1.91)	49.9 (1.96)	48.8 (1.92)	51.5 (2.03)	590.5 (23.25)
Average extreme snow depth cm (inches)	4.4 (1.7)	3.5 (1.4)	2.5 (1.0)	trace	0 (0)	0 (0)	0 (0)	0 (0)	0 (0)	0 (0)	0.8 (0.3)	3.3 (1.3)	8.4 (3.3)
Average precipitation days (≥ 0.1 mm)	16.1	14.2	14.4	11.9	13.2	13.9	14.6	12.2	11.8	14.5	15.0	17.7	169.5
Average relative humidity (%)	83.0	79.3	73.2	66.2	67.8	67.8	67.2	69.1	75.9	82.6	85.9	85.5	75.3
Source: Deutscher Wetterdienst / SKlima.de

== Mayors ==
- Konrad Döppert (CSU, 1946–1948)
- Richard Wildhagen (1948–1952)
- Siegfried Wilke (1952–1958)
- Dr. Oskar Klemmert (1958–1967)
- Rudolf Schardt (SPD, 1967–1991)
- Dr. Erwin Rumpel (CSU, 1991–1997)
- Bernd Moser (SPD, 1997–2008)
- Siegfried Müller (UsW, 2008–2020)
- Stefan Güntner (CSU, since 2020)

== Main sights ==
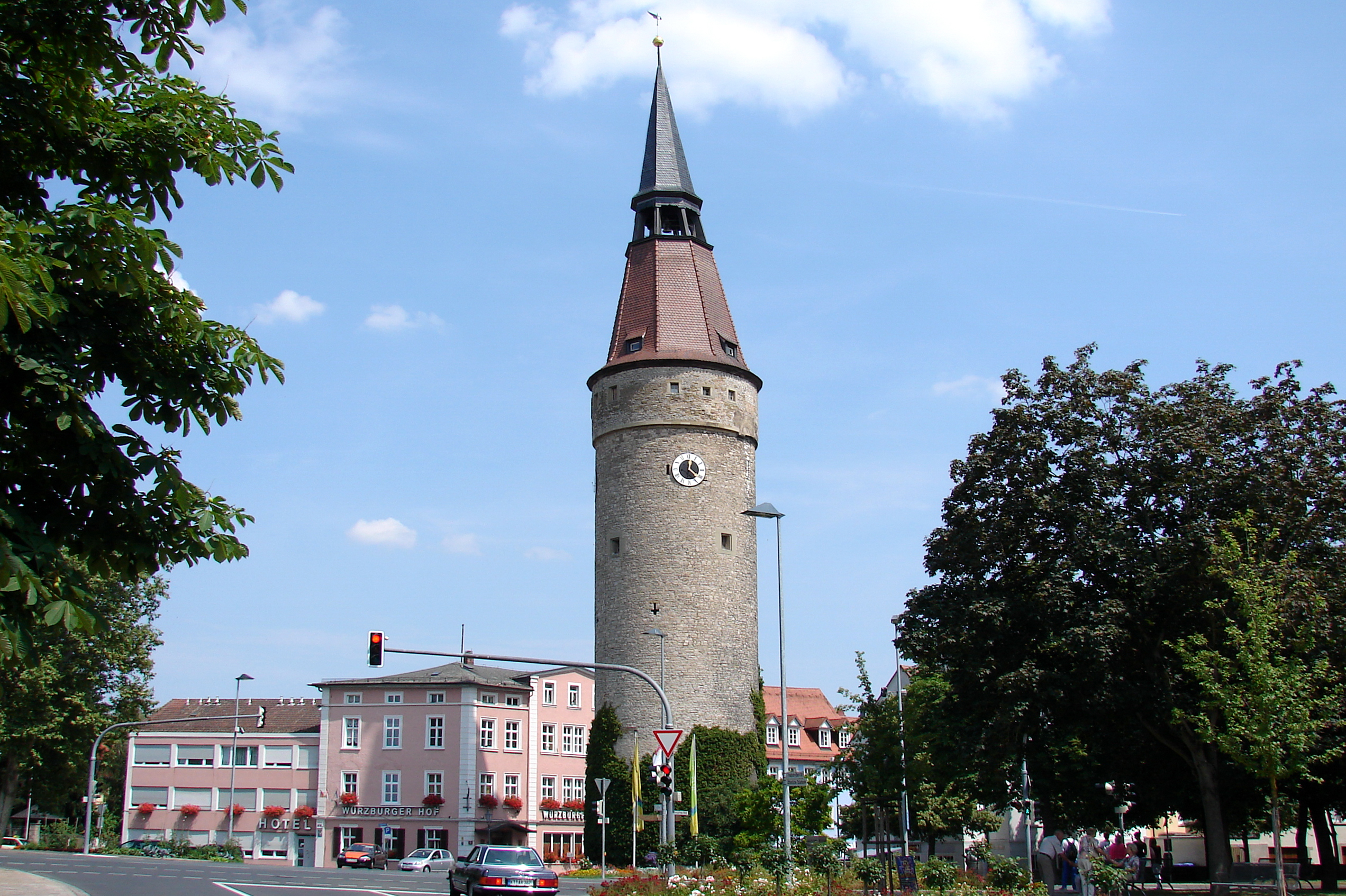
The Leaning Tower (Falterturm)

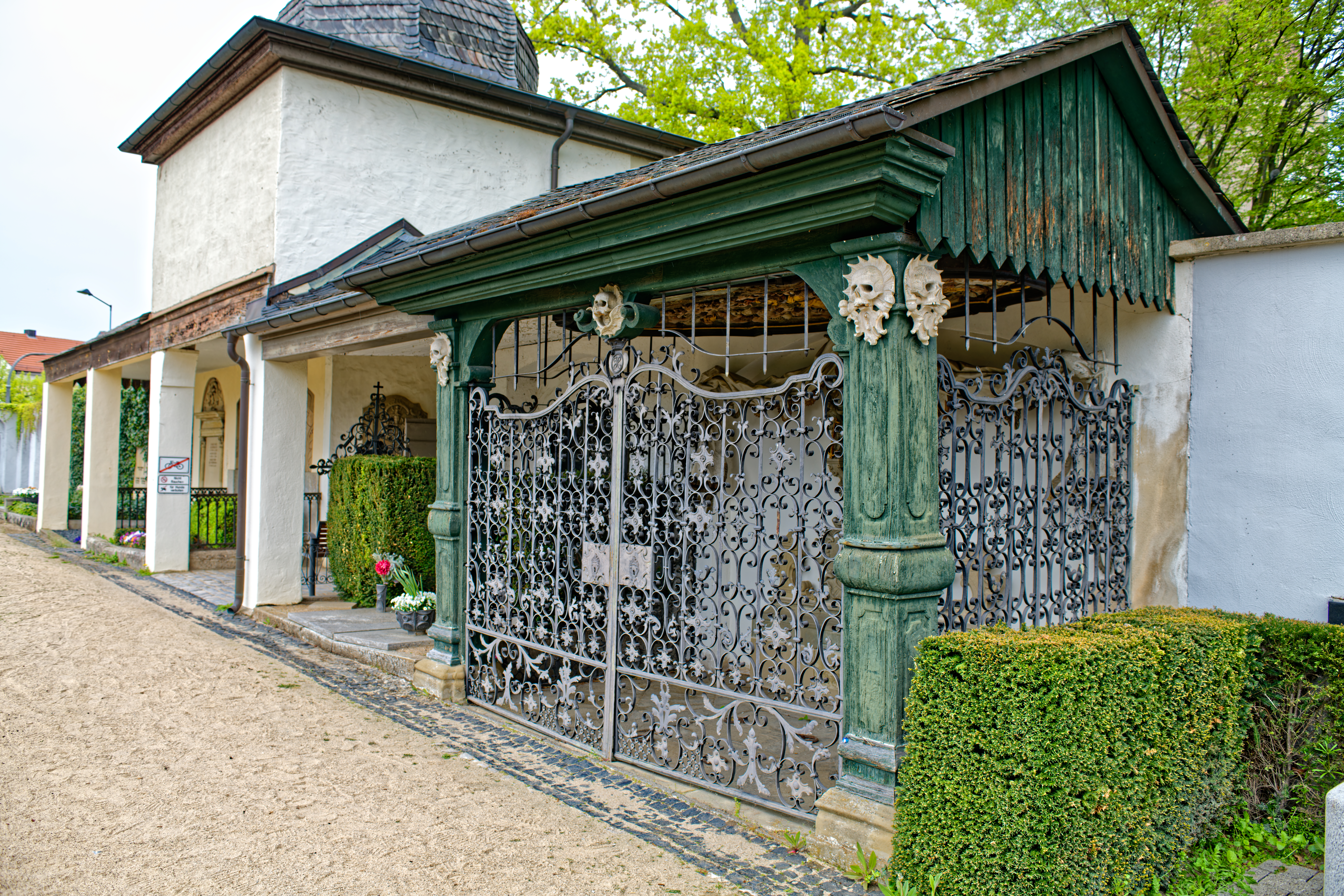
Herold family grave

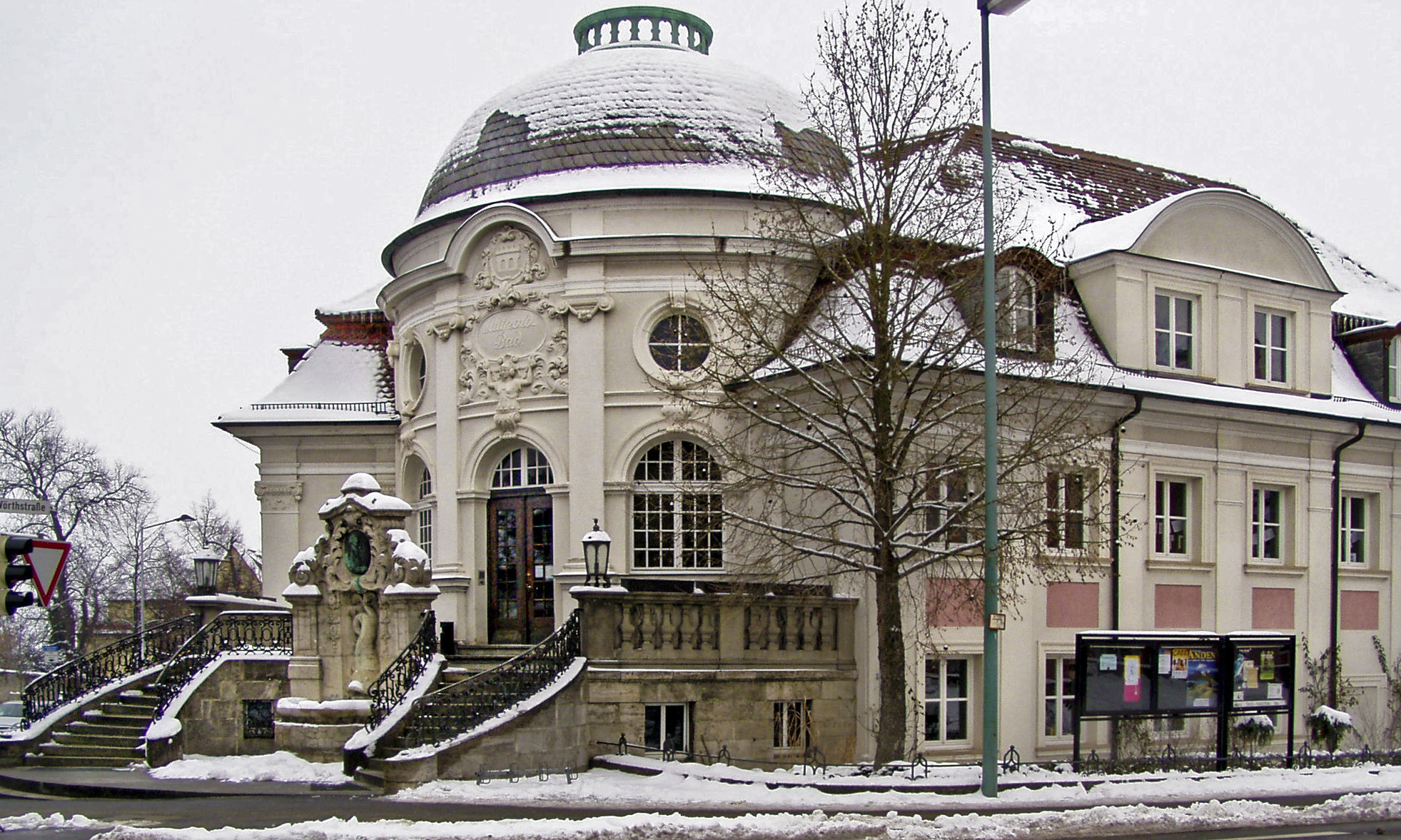
Former Luitpoldbad, today public library and a school

The town's main landmark is the leaning Falterturm (portcullis tower), a remnant of the city fortifications built in the 13th century. It is distinctive for its crooked roof. According to town legend, the tower was being built during a drought, and workers used wine instead of water to make the mortar, causing the top of the tower to lean. The actual reason behind the slant had been a sagging of the roof's trusses. From 1963 to 2011 the tower held a carnival museum; that museum has since moved into a nearby new location.

Across the street from the tower, the Kitzingen Old Cemetery is the location of the prominent grave of the rich Herold family. Due to the wrought iron gates with ornate decorations that include skulls and bats, US army troops stationed in the town after 1945 called this site the Grave of Dracula. Out of this connection grew another urban legend which states that the golden ball atop the crooked Falterturm - which leans towards the grave - contains the heart of Vlad Dracula of Romania.

Other historic sights in the city center include the old market place and city center with several buildings dating back to the 14th century. The old town hall was constructed in the 16th century. The four oldest churches in the city center were constructed atop the ruins of older sites of worship between the 15th to the 18th century. For that reason, there are no remains of the monastery that founded the town. Newer churches from the 20th century are outside the center. A large riverside synagoge building, constructed in 1883, burned in 1938 and used as a prison detention center during World War II, has been restored in the 1990s and serves as a memorial and cultural space today. The old stone bridge across the Main river was finished in the early 17th century. That bridge which is also pictured in the city seal, was predated by several wooden constructions, and has been remodeled multiple times, for example 1744, 1769, 1891, 1945–48, 1955 and 2019. In the past, there were also several beer breweries in the 'wine town' of Kitzingen: they mainly produced export beers. The largest beer cellar was located directly north of the city center, and is now open for guided tours.

== Twin towns – sister cities ==
Kitzingen is twinned with:

- Montevarchi, Italy
- Prades, France
- Trzebnica, Poland
- (Czech Republic) Nalžovské Hory, Czechia

== Notable people ==
- Johann Michael Fehr (1610–1688), doctor and scientist
- Bella Fromm (1890–1972), journalist and writer
- Max Hamburger (1897–1970), lawyer
- Ulf Hoelscher (born 1942), violinist and violin pedagogue
- Fridel Meyer (1904–1982), long-distance kayaker
- Friedrich Spiegel (1820–1905), orientalist
- Konrad Stürtzel (c. 1435–1509), during Maximilian I, Holy Roman Emperor, court chancellor of the Holy Roman Empire of the German Nation

== See also ==
- List of medieval stone bridges in Germany
