= Blackford Hill =

Hill in Edinburgh, Scotland

Coordinates: 55°55′N 3°12′W

- Cnoc an Àtha Dhuibh
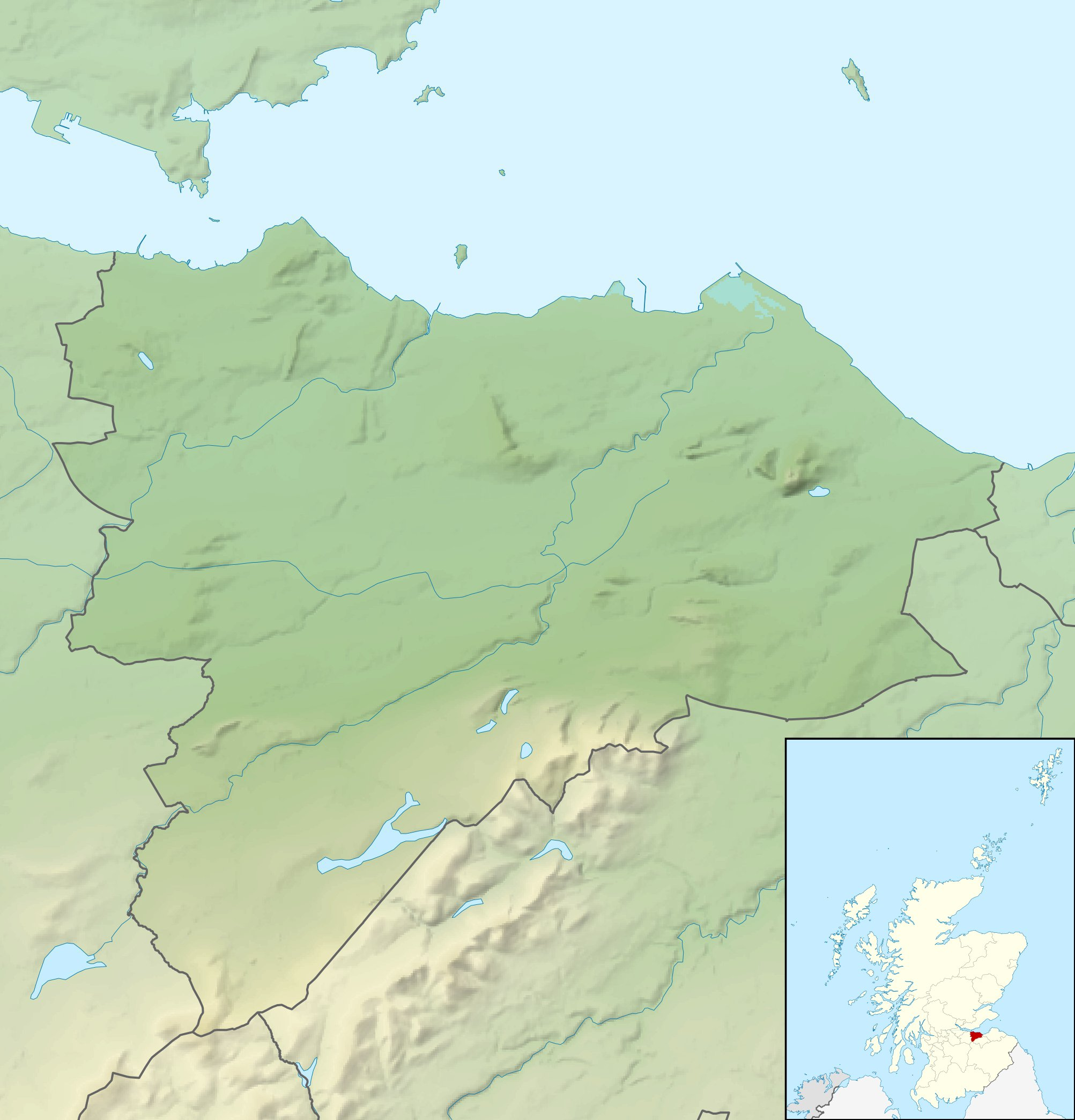
- Location within Edinburgh Location within the City of Edinburgh council area Location within Scotland

Highest point
- Elevation: 164 m (538 ft)
- Prominence: 63 m (207 ft)
- Isolation: 0.82 km (0.51 mi)

Geography
- Location: Blackford, Edinburgh, Scotland
- Topo map: OS Landranger 66

Climbing
- Easiest route: Start at the arch near Kings Buildings and walk up past the observatory, or drive to the observatory car park.

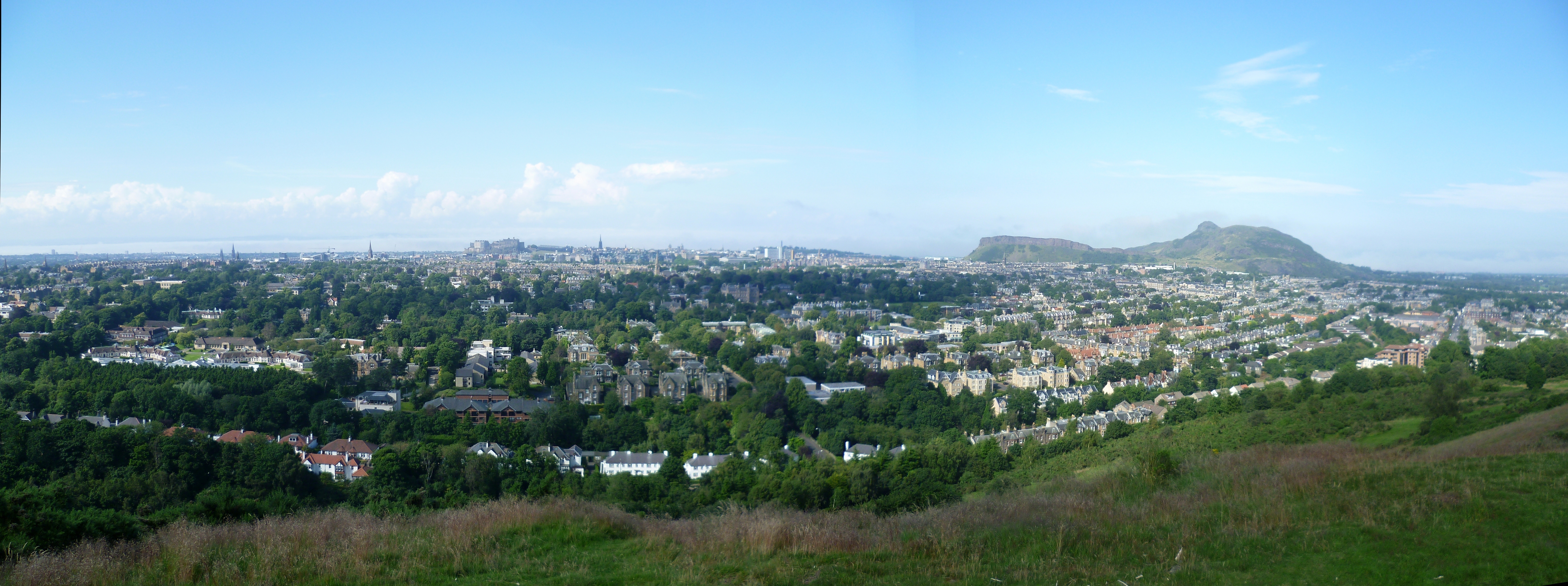
Panoramic view of Edinburgh from Blackford Hill (click for larger image)

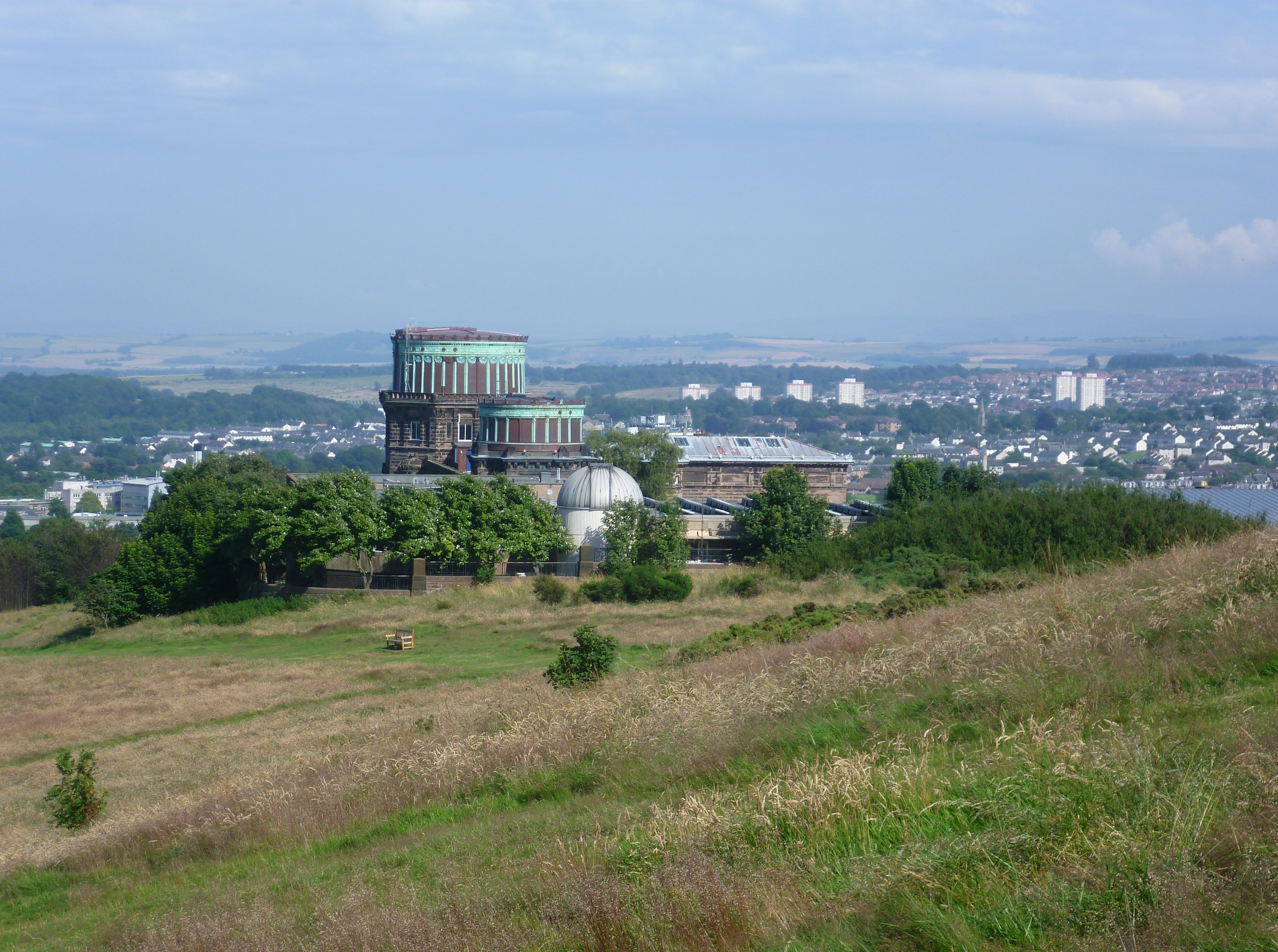
The Edinburgh Royal Observatory

Blackford Hill (Scottish Gaelic: Cnoc an Àtha Dhuibh) 164 metres (538 ft) is a hill in Edinburgh, the capital city of Scotland. It is in the area of Blackford, between Morningside, and the Braid Hills. Together with the Hermitage of Braid, it comprises the 60.3 hectares (149 acres) Hermitage of Braid and Blackford Hill Local Nature Reserve, within which lies Hermitage House.

== History ==
There is an ancient hill fort on the summit area of the hill which, along with the circular foundations of some nearby houses, is protected as a Scheduled Ancient Monument.

Blackford Hill was bought by the Edinburgh Corporation in 1884, and the adjacent Hermitage of Braid estate was given to the city of Edinburgh in 1938, by its final owner, John McDougal. The gift allowed the Hermitage to be used as "a Public Park or Recreation Ground for the benefit of the citizens." The City of Edinburgh Council retains ownership of the park and is primarily responsible for its maintenance. This is done primarily through the ranger service, with the assistance of other council teams such as Task Force and Forestry Unit.

== Geography ==
The hill has clear views over Edinburgh to the north, and the Pentland Hills to the south. It is popular with walkers, as it has many well established paths, as well as runners and other leisure users. There is a wide range of flora and fauna within a green belt area of Edinburgh, making it an important target for conservation. Around half of the area is unimproved grassland.

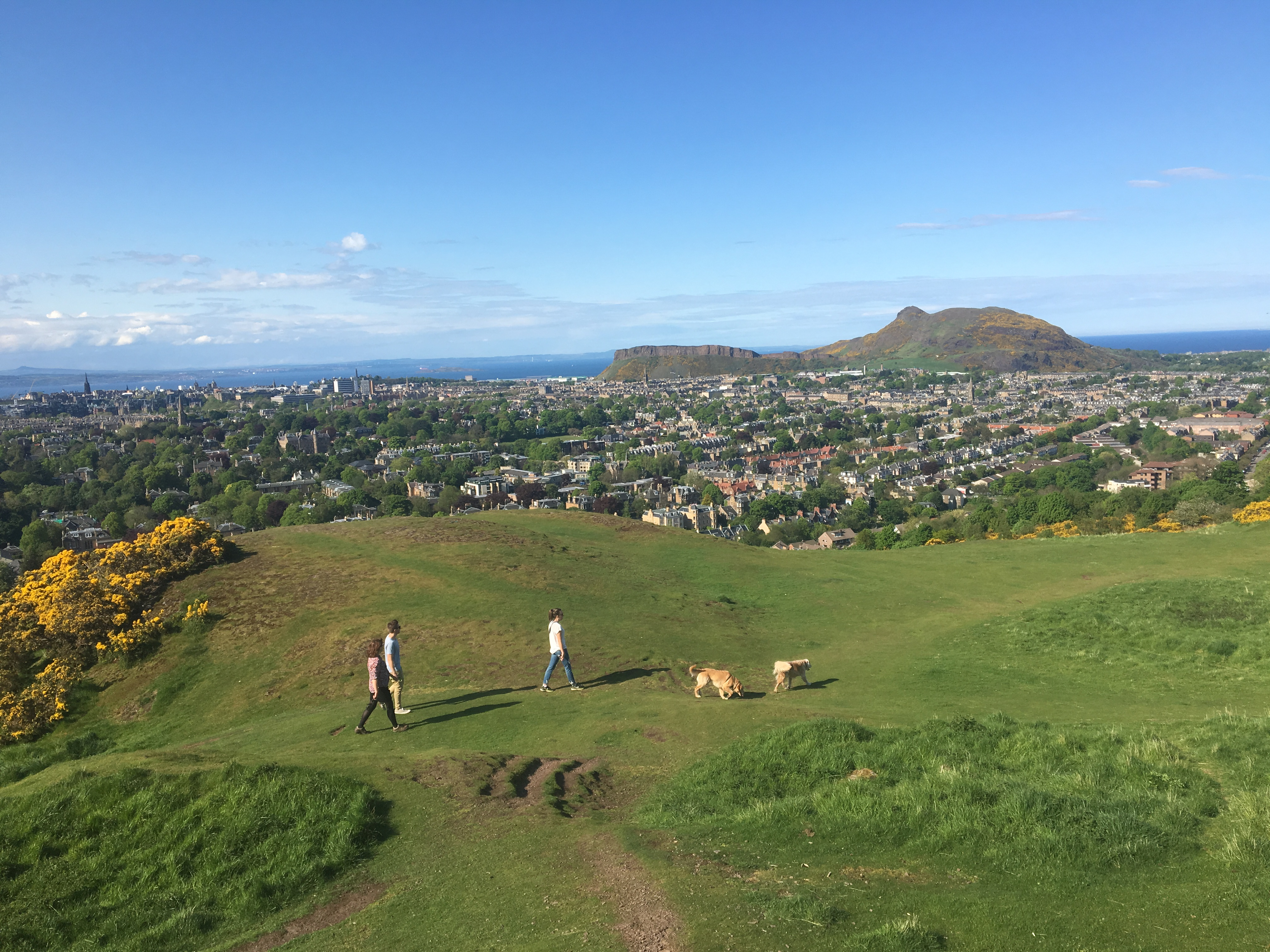
View of Arthur's Seat from Blackford Hill, with the start of Danger Hill to the left.

The Royal Observatory, Edinburgh is located near the summit. The hilltop also features a police radio transmitter and a meteorological station. Craigmillar Park golf course is situated to the east of Blackford Hill, near the observatory, and the Midmar allotments and Blackford Pond are adjacent to the hill on the north side.

Midmar Paddock is adjacent to the hill. Owned by the A. J. Laing Trust, proposals to develop it have attracted controversy.

=== Forestry ===
There are around 12 hectares (30 acres) of mature woodland on the hill, as well as some new trees on a reclaimed landfill mound planted in the late 1990s as part of the Millennium Forest Community Woodland.

=== Geology ===
Blackford Hill is formed from Lower Devonian volcanic rocks, lying between Upper Devonian sandstone, the northernmost extent of those found in the Pentland Hills to the South. Geologically the hill is different from the Carboniferous volcanic plugs and intrusions which form the remainder of Edinburgh's hills, with the exception of the nearby Braid Hills.

Of geological and historical interest is Agassiz Rock, a quarry-like feature, situated close to the hill, which was the first evidence of the action of glaciers to be found in Scotland, recognised by the Swiss geologist Louis Agassiz. It is a Site of Special Scientific Interest.

=== Braid Burn ===
The Braid Burn is the principal watercourse, flowing for some 3 kilometres (1.9 mi) through the nature reserve. It is a small river, typically around 5 metres (16 ft) wide by 20 centimetres (7.9 in) deep, although subject to significant variation. At this location it is approximately half way along its 32 kilometres (20 mi) course from a spring in the Pentland Hills, to its mouth at Portobello. There is a tunnel around 120 metres (390 ft) long in the vicinity of the House.

=== Danger Hill ===
Danger Hill is a grassy slope on Blackford Hill, known to be a popular site for ball games. A particular game named after the hill called the 'danger game' involves trying to stop a ball thrown by someone from rolling all the way down the hill. It is around 30 metres in height. Its name came from the distinctly steep gradient of the slope making it challenging to climb up, especially in wet weather.

=== Blackford Pond ===
Blackford Pond lies to the north of the hill, and is popular with families.

== See also ==
- Blackford Hill railway station
