= Blackford Pond =

Pond in Blackford, Edinburgh, Scotland

- Lochan an Àtha Dhuibh
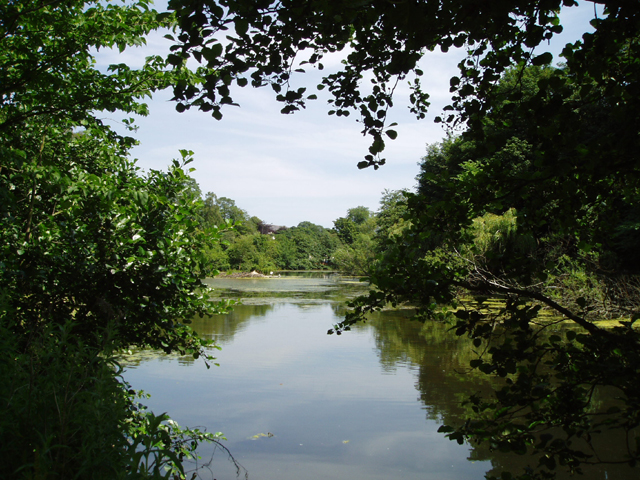
- View of the pond

- Location within Edinburgh
- Location: Edinburgh
- Coordinates: 55°55′31″N 3°11′45″W
- Type: Freshwater pond
- Primary inflows: None
- Primary outflows: Overflow drain
- Catchment area: Blackford Hill
- Basin countries: Scotland
- Max. length: 225 metres (738 ft)
- Max. width: 60 metres (200 ft)

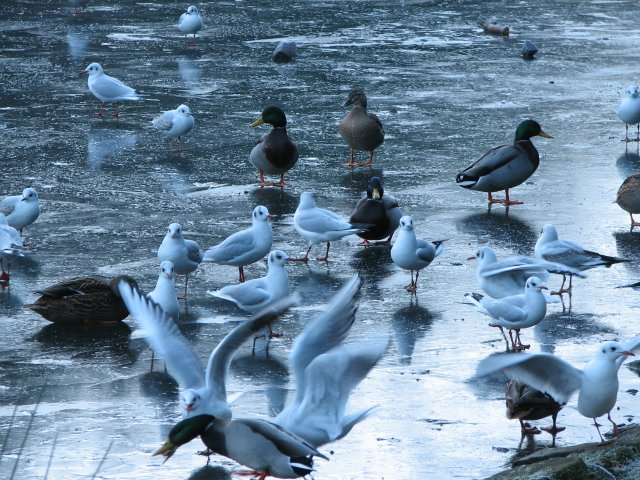
Birds on the frozen pond

Blackford Pond (Scottish Gaelic: Lochan an Àtha Dhuibh) is a small, artificial pond in the Blackford area of Edinburgh, Scotland. The pond was created during the Victorian era in a glacial hollow in the Blackford region of Edinburgh. According to Ordnance Survey maps, it was created between 1800 and 1900 in an ice-scoured hollow.

== Wildlife ==
It has significant populations of birds, including swans and ducks. There is a small bird house on the artificial island in the middle of the pond, which attracts birds all year round. The pond used to be used by the University of Edinburgh to demonstrate the use of mark and recapture to count fish.

== Geography ==
The pond measures 225 by 60 metres (738 by 197 ft), and has an island originally 8 by 40 metres (26 by 131 ft) in size, but the island had been eroded to a quarter of this size until it was restored in 2010.

The water is eutrophic due to run-off from the neighbouring allotments, as well as remains of bread given to birds and the faeces of the birds. This can lead to algal blooms that deplete the level of oxygen in the pond. There are no visible inflows, but there is a drain at the eastern end which keeps the water level constant.

In 2010, it underwent £13,000 worth of work, in order to repair the overgrazed margins of the pond.

== Accessibility ==
The pond is popular with families, due to its accessibility and the presence of a play area. The pond is next to Blackford Hill, and is easily accessed from both ends.

The pond was used by the Waverley Curling Club, which formed in 1848 from members of the Merchiston Curling Club. Photographs show curling was played on the pond well into the 20th century. The pond often freezes over sufficiently to support the weight of birds, but does not freeze solidly enough to safely support a human.
