= Blackford High School =

Blackford High School may refer to:

- Blackford High School (Hartford City, Indiana)
- Blackford High School, San Jose, California, renamed to Boynton High School in 2002
