= Katherine M. H. Blackford =

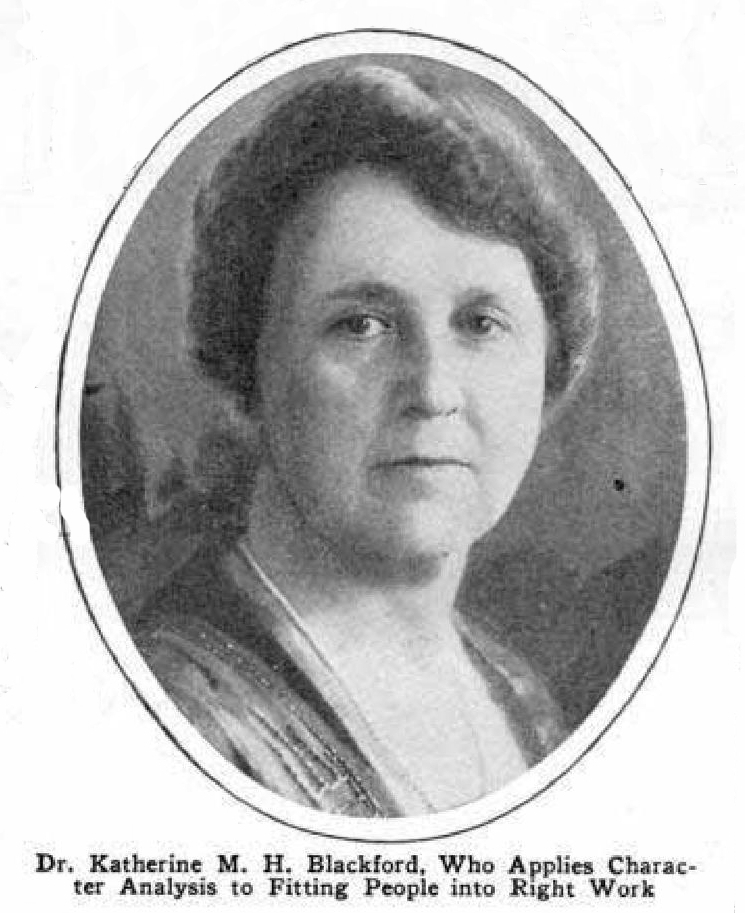
Blackford in 1927

Katherine M. H. Blackford (born 18 Mar 1875, West Mineral, Kansas as Katherine Melvina Huntsinger; died 11 Sep 1958, San Diego), was an American pioneering writer on human resources. She also wrote books on "character analysis", which went into many editions.

She was born Katherine Melvina Huntsinger, daughter of Henry and Catherine (Schock) Huntsinger, and married Everett F. Blackford in 1899 in Jackson, Missouri. She later married Arthur William Newcomb, b. 21 Jun 1873, Sun Prairie, Wisconsin, on 28 Nov 1912 in Chicago. Newcomb went on to edit Katherine M. H. Blackford's books and co-author several others. He became the director of the Blackford School of Character Analysis in New York City. She was a frequent lecturer on the subject.

Both Blackford and Newcomb had an association with Harrington Emerson.

Blackford's significant books include:

- Science of Character Analysis, 1910
- Employers' manual: Instructions to employment supervisors and other executives in the use of the Blackford employment plan, Emerson Co (1912)
- The job, the man, the boss, Garden City, N.Y., Doubleday, Page & Company, 1914 OCLC 1678858 Held in 145 libraries according to WorldCat, revised ed. 1921
- A pocket manual for character analysts and employment managers based on the Blackford system, Printed by J. F. Newcomb & co., 1915 - 6
- Blondes And Brunets (1916), with Arthur Newcomb. New York, The Review of reviews company, 1916. OCLC 3456876
- Reading character at sight, with Arthur Newcomb, New York : Independent Corporation, 1918, OCLC 35309699 new ed., 1922
- How to read your own character by Katherine M. H. Blackford University of Michigan Library (January 1, 1919)
- Character Analysis by the Observational Method, Blackford Publishers Inc., 1918. OCLC 10587712. Multiple eds. through 1922
- Analyzing Character: The New Science of Judging Men: misfits in business, the home and social life, w/ Arthur Newcomb. New York, The Review of Reviews Company, 1916 OCLC 656938377. Multiple editions. through 1918
- The right job,: How to choose, prepare for, and succeed in it; a treatise for parents, guardians, teachers and vocational counselors, The Review of reviews corporation (1924) OCLC 1811303
