= Blackford, Edinburgh =

Area of Edinburgh, Scotland

Coordinates: 55°55′35.20″N 3°11′10.94″W

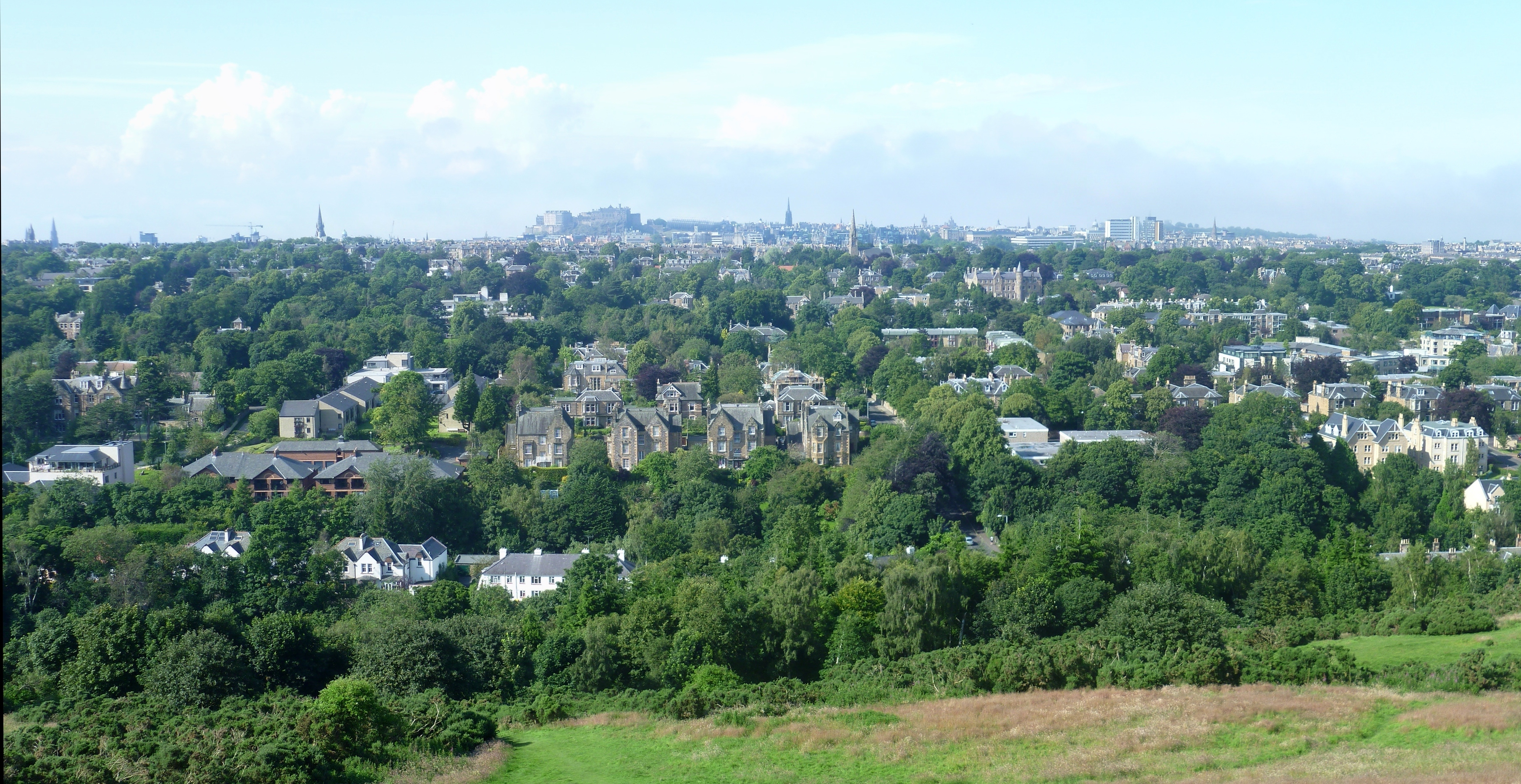
View from Blackford Hill, looking north towards Edinburgh.

Blackford (Scottish Gaelic: An t-Àth Dubh) is an area in the south of Edinburgh, the capital city of Scotland. It is located near Morningside, and The Grange. Blackford Hill dominates the view to the south. The majority of the Blackford is now housing, mostly dating from the Victorian or Edwardian eras.

The local parish church of the Church of Scotland is the Reid Memorial Church, which was opened in 1935.

It is home to the University of Edinburgh campus of King's Buildings.

== See also ==
- Jordan Burn
- Blackford Hill
- Blackford Pond
