= List of proposed railway stations in Scotland =

This page lists proposed railway stations in Scotland.

== Aberdeen and Aberdeenshire ==
- Aberdeen Airport
- Aberdeen South
- Altens
- Bucksburn
- Cove
- Ellon
- Fraserburgh
- Kittybrewster
- Newtonhill
- Persley
- Peterhead
- Westhill

== Angus ==
- Forfar

== Argyll & Bute ==
- Faslane

== Clackmannanshire ==
- Cambus
- Clackmannan
- Kincardine
- Longannet

== Dumfries and Galloway ==
- Beattock
- Dunragit/Glenruce
- Eastriggs
- Ecclefechan
- Thornhill

== Dundee ==
- Craigie/West Ferry
- Dundee Airport
- Dundee West

== East Ayrshire ==
- Altonhill
- Cumnock
- Hurlford
- Kilmarnock Northwest
- Kilmarnock East
- Kilmarnock South
- Mauchline

== East Dunbartonshire ==
- Allander
- Westerhill
- Woodilee

== East Lothian ==
- Blindwells
- Musselburgh P&R

== East Renfrewshire ==
- Auchenback

== Edinburgh ==
- Abbeyhill
- Blackford Hill
- Craiglockhart
- Duddingston & Craigmillar
- Gorgie East
- Morningside Road
- Newington
- Piershill
- Portobello

== Falkirk ==
- Bonnybridge
- Grangemouth

== Fife ==
- Dysart
- Halbeath
- Kirkcaldy East
- Newburgh
- St Andrews
- Sinclairtown
- Wormit

== Glasgow ==
- Blochairn
- Citizens
- Drumchapel West
- Finnieston
- Germiston
- Glasgow Cross
- Ibrox
- Jordanhill West
- Millerston
- Parkhead Forge
- West Street

== Highlands ==
- Balloch (Highland)
- Beechwood
- Culloden
- Evanton
- Halkirk

== Midlothian ==
- Penicuik

== Moray ==
- Kinloss

== North Ayrshire ==
- Ardrossan North
- Largs Marina
- Drybridge

== North Lanarkshire ==
- Abronhill
- Castlecary
- Crosshill
- Mossend
- Plains
- Ravenscraig

== Perth & Kinross ==
- Abernethy
- Bridge of Earn
- Errol
- Greenloaning/Blackford
- Oudenarde

== Renfrewshire ==
- Erskine
- Glasgow Airport
- West Paisley

== Scottish Borders ==
=== As part of an extension of the Borders Railway ===
- Melrose
- Hawick
- Newcastleton

== South Ayrshire ==
- Ayr Hospital

== South Lanarkshire ==
- Bogleshole
- Burnbank
- Kirktonholme
- Law
- Symington

== Stirling ==
- Bannockburn

== West Lothian ==
- Broxburn
- Winchburgh

== See also ==
- Glasgow Subway#Future development and Clyde Metro
