= Five Sisters Zoo =

- Interactive map of Five Sisters Zoo
- 55°51′49.67″N 03°33′33.94″W
- Date opened: 2005
- Location: West Calder, West Lothian, Scotland
- Land area: 20 acres (2014)
- No. of species: 230 (2026)
- Memberships: British and Irish Association of Zoos and Aquariums (BIAZA)
- Website: fivesisterszoo.co.uk

Five Sisters Zoo is a privately owned zoological park located in Polbeth, West Calder. The zoo was founded by Brian and Shirley Curran and originally operated as an attraction within their garden centre on the same site. The zoo officially opened in 2005 when it was granted a licence to display wild animals to the public.

The zoo is named after the Five Sisters shale bings located to the north of West Calder.

Since 2012, the zoo has worked with Belgian rescue shelter Natuurhulpcentrum to rehome rescued animals including brown bears, lions and an asiatic black bear.

The zoo was named the ‘Best Family Day Out’ at the 2024 Scottish Entertainment and Hospitality Awards.

The zoo is a member of the British and Irish Association of Zoos and Aquariums (BIAZA).

== History ==
Five Sisters Zoo originally began as an attraction in the garden centre owned by founders Brian and Shirley Curran. The couple had placed a rabbit enclosure inside the centre to entertain children while their parents shopped. The couple are passionate about animals and began to accept rescued animals for the public and zoos. Early arrivals included a hedgehog, a 28-year-old ring tailed lemur from Edinburgh Zoo, animals from Gorgie City Farm, wallabies and an emu that were rescued from an animal sanctuary in Fife and a number of African spurred tortoises seized by customs inspectors. The zoo officially began in 2005 when it was granted a licence to display wild animals to the public.

The zoo's expansion was supported by donations from local supporters and substantial fundraising campaigns, which have funded the construction of new enclosures for larger rescue animals. Notable additions to the zoo include a £150,000 fundraising appeal in 2015 to create a habitat for four male lions rescued from a Belgian circus.

In April 2013, a fire started in the zoo's reptile house, which spread to some of the adjacent enclosures. Animals of 48 species died in this fire, including almost all the insects, snakes, lizards and tortoises housed in the building as well as eleven meerkats and a Eurasian otter. The fire was brought under control by fire crews from the Scottish Fire and Rescue Service with five fire engines and six specialist appliances involved. A faulty heating element within the reptile house is believed to have caused the fire.

== Animals and exhibits ==
=== Lions ===
The zoo has housed lions since 2015, when it rescued four male lions which were seized from a circus in Belgium keeping them illegally. The construction of the two-acre lion enclosure, featuring rock, a waterfall, pool and platform areas and a large, heated indoor den was supported by a £150,000 funding appeal. In 2024, the zoo became home to two lionesses that were rescued from a facility in Eastern Ukraine.

=== Asiatic black bear ===
In January 2024, the zoo re-homed Yampil, a 12-year-old Asiatic black bear that was rescued from a zoo in Donetsk province after being injured by shelling during the Russian invasion. Yampil was one of only seven survivors from the nearly 200 animals at the zoo and was discovered by Ukrainian soldiers when they recaptured the area in 2022. The zoo created a £200,0000 appeal was created to fund the construction of a new enclosure for the bear. Yampil died following an anaesthetic procedure in July 2024 during treatment for ongoing health problems.

=== Ring-tailed lemur ===
The zoo was home to the world's oldest ring-tailed lemur, Stumpy, who died in August 2025 at the age of 39, after 20 years at the zoo. Named, for his shorter than usual tail, Stumpy had 11 offspring and 25 grandchildren that now live in zoos across Europe.

=== Other mammals ===
Other notable mammal species in the zoo's collection include arctic wolves, Asian fishing cats, black lemurs, white-faced Saki monkeys, vervet monkeys, snow leopards, Scottish wildcats, red pandas, fennec foxes, fossa, clouded leopards and cheetahs.
