= Citizens Advice Edinburgh =

Scottish charity

- Founded: 1939
- Type: Charity
- Registration no.: Scotland (SC038195)
- Location: Edinburgh, Scotland
- Volunteers: 270+
- Website: www.citizensadviceedinburgh.org.uk

Citizens Advice Edinburgh (CAE), is a registered charity (number SC038195), based in Edinburgh, Scotland. Founded in 1939, Citizens Advice Edinburgh is a member of the Scottish Association of Citizens Advice Bureaux, and provides free, confidential, independent and impartial advice to Edinburgh residents.

Citizens Advice Edinburgh operates from five main offices around Edinburgh, with the support of over 270 trained volunteers which comprise over 90% of the advisers, receptionists and administrators. CAE has offices in Leith, Dundas Street, Gorgie, Pilton and Portobello. In 2013/14 it assisted with over 27,000 enquiries and 43,000 issues

Citizens Advice Edinburgh is a charity and a company limited by guarantee. It is run by a Board of volunteers with a wide range of charity, business, legal, media and financial experience. The board adheres to the National Council for Voluntary Organisations's good governance code.

== History ==
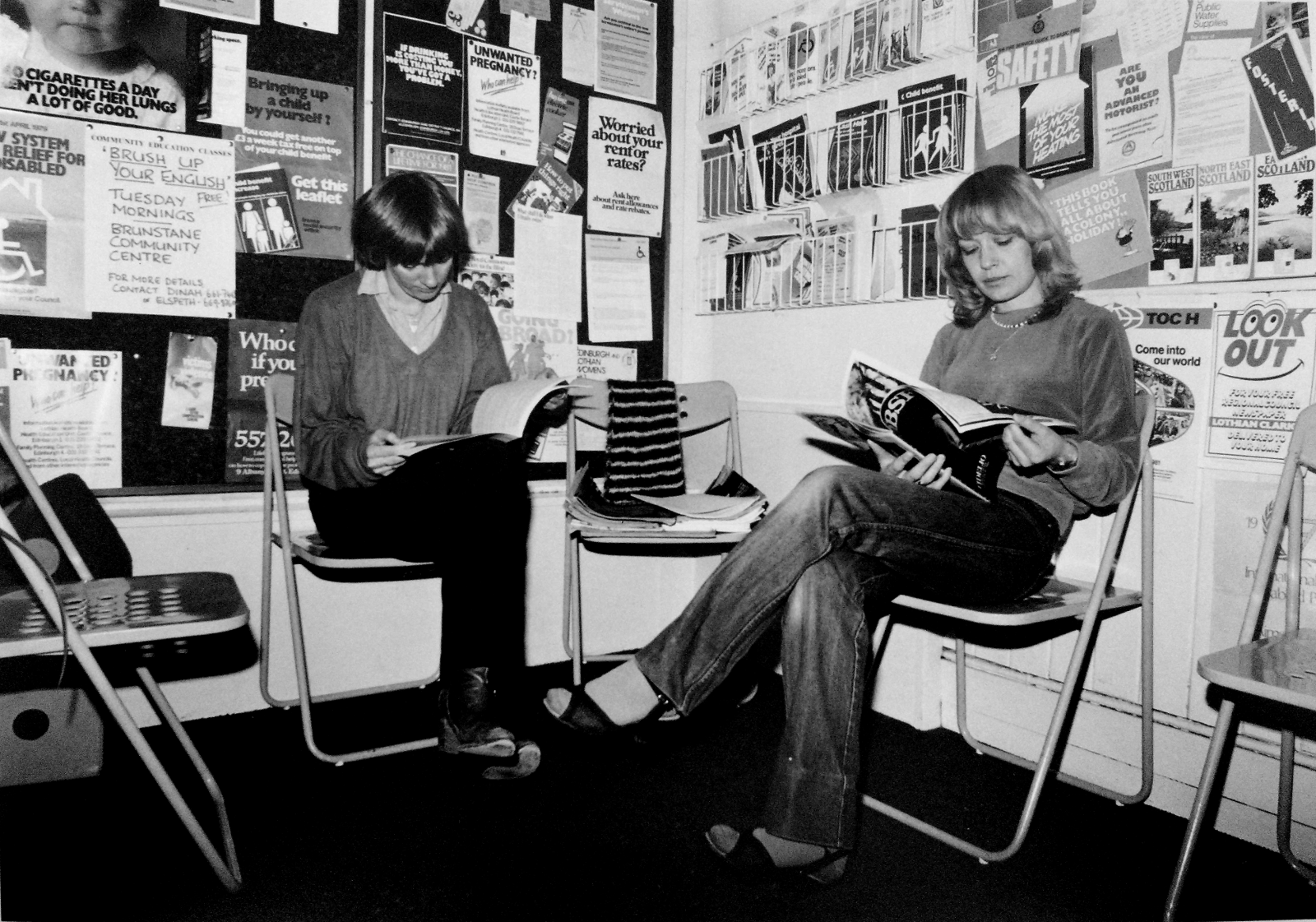
Portobello Bureau waiting room, 1979.

Citizens Advice Edinburgh was one of the first Citizens Advice Bureaus established in the United Kingdom in the initial days of World War II in September 1939. Originally based in Charlotte Lane and Queen Street in Edinburgh, Citizens Advice Bureaus across the country were part of the domestic strategy to help the population during wartime. Bureaux were initially intended as a short term measure, but it was evident when the war ended there were many more problems for the population as the government tackled re-housing, employment and re-deployment, training and education, and the introduction of welfare benefits.

Although originally each of the five citizens advice bureaux in Edinburgh were independent registered charities, the decision was taken in 2007 to merge the governance of each into one larger charity in order to consolidate and maximise resources in Edinburgh.

=== 75th anniversary ===
Citizens Advice Edinburgh celebrated its 75th anniversary of supporting Edinburgh with community based free, independent, impartial and confidential advice in 2014/2015.

== Locations ==
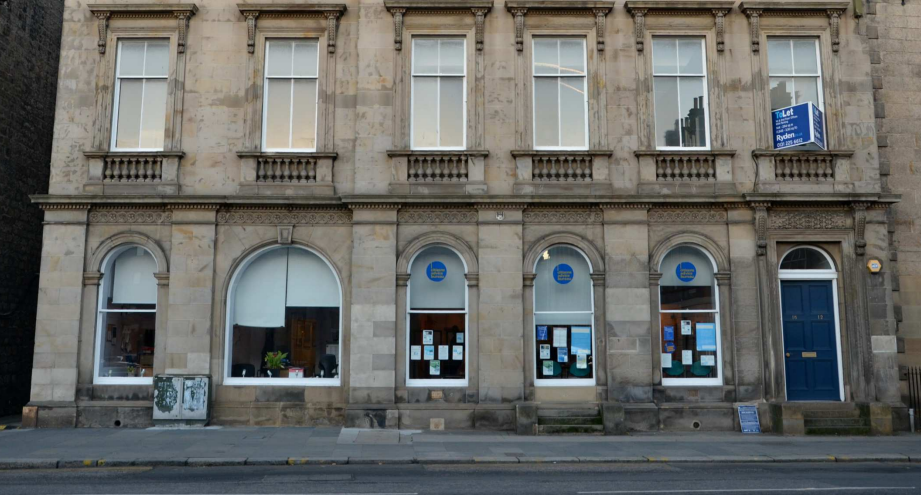
Leith Citizens Advice Bureau, 2015

CAE provides generalist advice services through five main bureau locations and over 25 outreach locations around Edinburgh.

=== Dundas Street ===
Dundas Street Bureau is the oldest premises currently operated by CAE, having existed as a Citizens Advice Bureau since 1962. Dundas Street is also the largest bureau in Edinburgh with the highest number of enquiries per week, partly due to the central Edinburgh location of this bureau.

=== Gorgie/Dalry ===
Gorgie/Dalry bureau opened in 1983, before moving to its current location in Fountainbridge Library in 1996.

=== Leith ===
Leith Citizens Advice Bureau is the second largest Bureau in Edinburgh and also serves as an administrative base for CAE.

=== Pilton ===
Pilton Citizens Advice Bureau opened in 1979.

=== Portobello ===
Portobello Citizens Advice Bureau opened in 1976. Originally co-located with Portobello Baptist Church, it soon after moved to its current location on Bath Street.

== Services ==
Advice Areas in Citizens Advice Edinburgh, 2014/2015

Citizens Advice Edinburgh offers generalist advice on virtually any topic. All advice given is free, independent, impartial and confidential. Advice areas include:

- Money - Debt, Employment, Benefits, Tax
- Family - Family, Health, Housing, Education
- Daily Life - Communications, Consumer Affairs, Travel
- Rights - Civil Rights, Immigration, Legal Rights and Responsibilities

The majority of advice work carried out by Citizens Advice Edinburgh is in relation to three specific areas; benefits advice, debt advice, and employment advice.

== Awards and Accreditations ==
- Citizens Advice Scotland Audit 2012 - 2015 - Citizens Advice Scotland audits member bureaux every three years. Only services which meet strict quality of advice and organisational standards are accredited and can operate as a Citizens Advice Bureau.
- Investors in Volunteers 2012 - 2015 - Citizens Advice Edinburgh gained Investors in Volunteers status in 2012
- Inspiring Volunteer of the Year 2013 - A volunteer adviser received the Lord Provost of Edinburgh's 'Inspiring Volunteer of the Year' award in 2013.
- Forth One's Best Place to Work in Edinburgh and Lothians 2013 - Citizens Advice Edinburgh secured third place in Forth One's 'best place to work in Edinburgh and Lothians' award in 2013

== See also ==
- Citizens Advice Scotland
- Scots law
- Citizens Advice, England and Wales
