= Craiglockhart railway station =

Former railway station in Scotland

Coordinates: 55.9280°N 3.2284°W

Craiglockhart Station
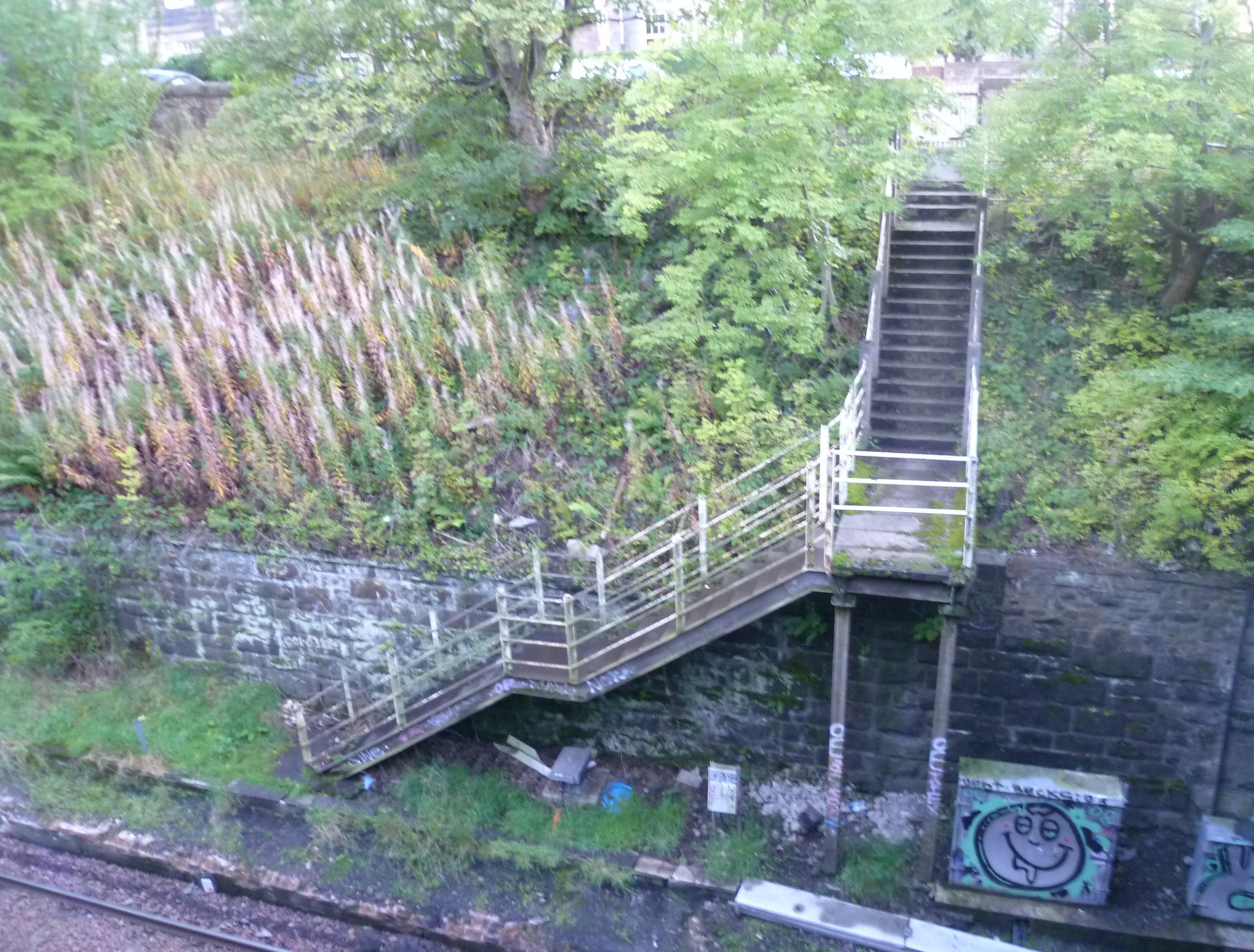
- Site of Craiglockhart Station (disused)

General information
- Location: Craiglockhart, Edinburgh, City of Edinburgh; Scotland
- Platforms: 2

Other information
- Status: Disused

History
- Original company: Edinburgh Suburban and Southside Junction Railway
- Pre-grouping: North British Railway
- Post-grouping: London and North Eastern Railway

Key dates
- 1 June 1887: Opened
- 1 January 1917: Closed due to the wartime economy
- 1 February 1919: Re-opened
- 10 September 1962: Station closed to passengers
Location

Craiglockhart Railway Station was a railway station in Scotland on the Edinburgh Suburban and Southside Junction Railway (SSJR). It was opened on 1 June 1887. Located on Colinton Road next to the Myreside Aqueduct of the Union Canal, it served the Craiglockhart area of Edinburgh, in the south-west of the city.

Craiglockhart station closed in 1962, when passenger rail services were withdrawn from the Edinburgh Suburban line although the line itself was retained for rail freight use. The route continues to be used for freight services to this day, so freight trains avoid Edinburgh's main stations of Edinburgh Waverley and Haymarket, and occasionally diverted passenger trains also pass along this line.

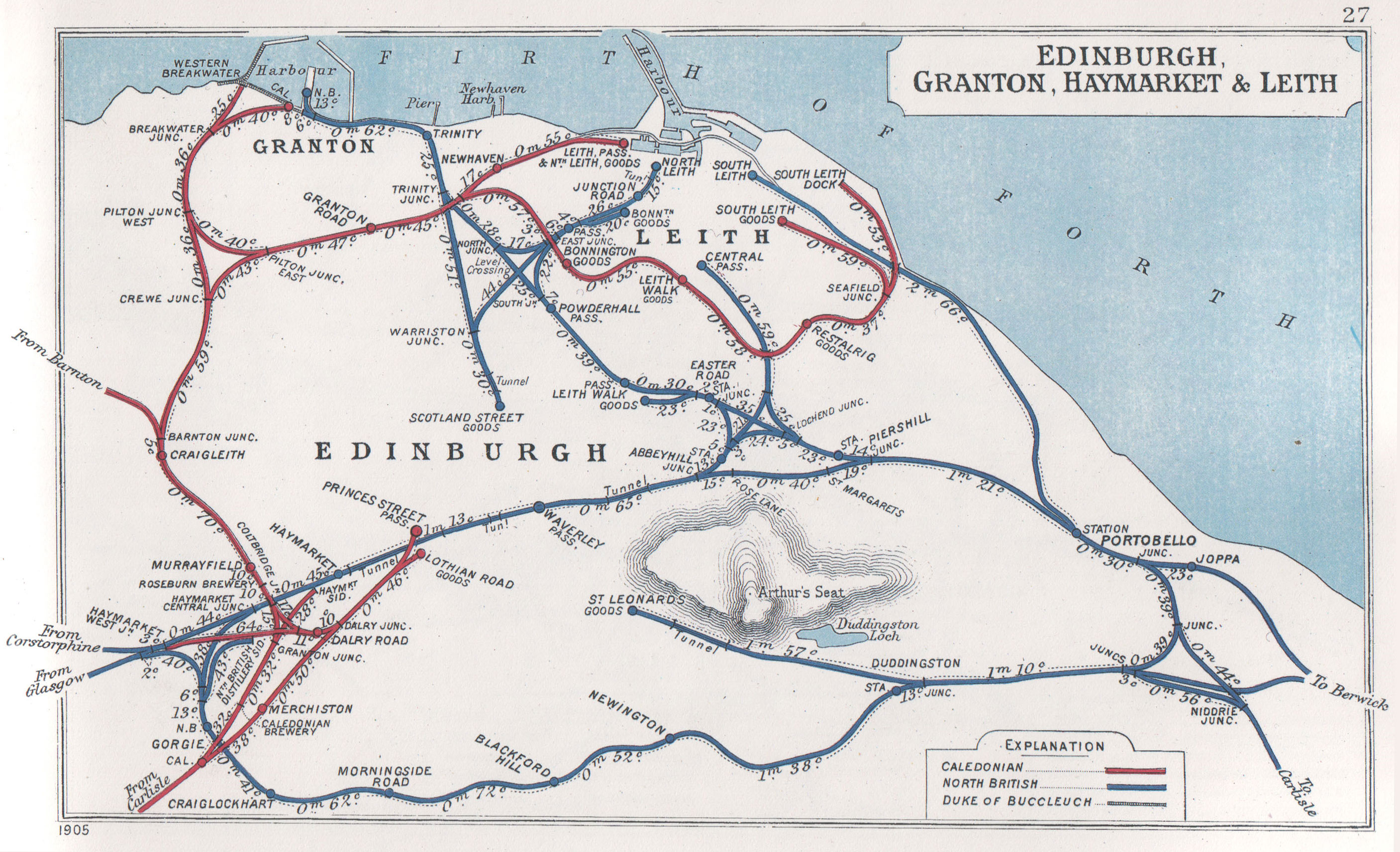
A 1905 Railway Clearing House diagram of Edinburgh railways, with the SSJR (in blue along the bottom)

== Future ==
A local campaigning group, the Capital Rail Action Group (CRAG), is running a campaign for the SSJR line to be re-opened to passenger services, and proposes that it should be operated either as a commuter rail service or as a light rail system to form an extension of the forthcoming Edinburgh Tram Network. Following a petition submitted to the Scottish Parliament in 2007, the proposal was rejected in 2009 by transport planners due to anticipated cost.

Preceding station	Historical railways	Following station
Morningside Road; Line open, station closed	North British Railway; Edinburgh Suburban Line	Gorgie East; Line open, station closed
