= Polbeth =

Polbeth: Scottish Gaelic: Poll Beithe; Scots: Powbeth
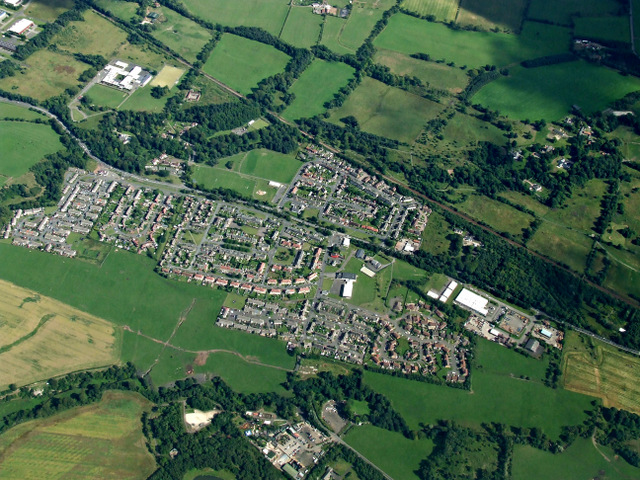
- An aerial view of Polbeth

- Location within West Lothian
- Population: 2,380 (2020)
- OS grid reference: NT025645
- Civil parish: West Calder
- Community council: Polbeth
- Council area: West Lothian
- Lieutenancy area: West Lothian
- Country: Scotland
- Sovereign state: United Kingdom
- Post town: WEST CALDER
- Postcode district: EH55
- Dialling code: 01506
- Police: Scotland
- Fire: Scottish
- Ambulance: Scottish
- UK Parliament: Livingston
- Scottish Parliament: Almond Valley

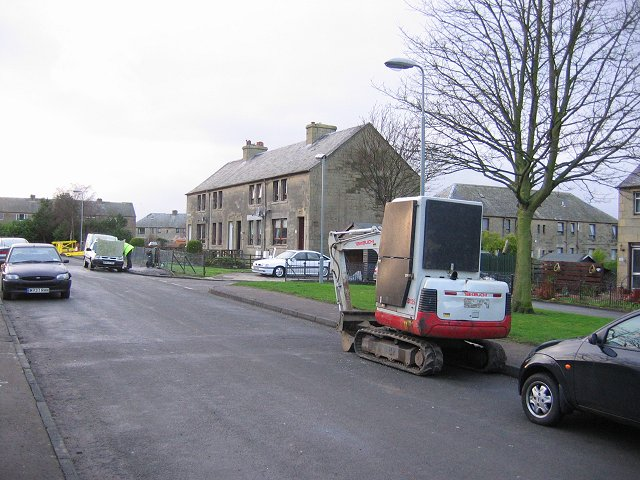

Polbeth (/ˌpoʊlˈbɛθ/; G. Poll - pool beithe - birch tree "birch pool") is a former oil shale mining village located about a mile from West Calder, and not far from Livingston, West Lothian, Scotland.

== Five Sisters ==
A mile to the west of the village are the Five Sisters Shale Bings, a local landmark and scheduled monument (55°51′35″N 03°35′05″W). The bings rise to a height of 720 feet (220 m), some 230 feet (70 m) above the surrounding area, and are the spoil tips from the oil shale industry that was a feature of the area.

== Five Sisters Zoo Park ==
The Five Sisters Zoo Park is located on the edge of the village and has animals such as a lion and wolves.

== Polbeth Harwood Church ==
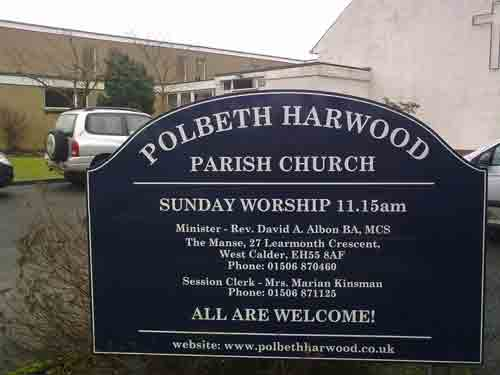

Harwood Church was one of two Church of Scotland churches in West Calder. The other was in Polbeth, and the two churches were amalgamated.

Worship in Polbeth took place in what previously had been the Engine House of Shale Pit 26. When mining ceased in the community the Engine House was converted into what is now known as Polbeth Hall. Worship took place here while the new church was being built.

== Notable people ==
- Rhys McCabe, former footballer.
- Shelley Kerr, former footballer. Current coach of the women's Scottish national football team.
- Callum Fordyce, footballer currently playing for Airdrieonians
- Billy Hartman, actor
