= The Mulgray Twins =

The Mulgray Twins are the authors of a series of crime novels featuring undercover Customs investigator D.J. Smith and her sidekick, a trained sniffer-cat called Gorgonzola. Their novels are quirky and gently humorous.

== Biography ==
Helen and Morna Mulgray (born 1939 in Joppa, Edinburgh) are identical twins who took up writing after they retired from teaching English at two neighbouring secondary schools near Edinburgh. Helen, inspiring the children of Gorebridge and Newtongrange at Greenhall High School, with Morna doing the same for the children of Loanhead and Bonnyrigg at Lasswade.

== Bibliography ==
- No Suspicious Circumstances (2007)
- Under Suspicion (2008)
- Above Suspicion (2010)
- Suspects All (2011)
- No. 1 Suspect (2012)
- Acting Suspiciously (2014)
