= Gorgie East railway station =

Former railway station in Scotland

Coordinates: 55.9338°N 3.2369°W

Gorgie East

General information
- Location: Gorgie, City of Edinburgh; Scotland
- Platforms: 2

Other information
- Status: Disused

History
- Original company: Edinburgh Suburban and Southside Junction Railway
- Pre-grouping: North British Railway
- Post-grouping: London and North Eastern Railway

Key dates
- 1 December 1884: Opened as Gorgie station
- 1952: Renamed Gorgie East station
- 10 September 1962: Station closed to passengers
- 21 May 1969: Station re-opened for one day for a military event
Location
- Location within the City of Edinburgh council area

Gorgie East Railway Station (named Gorgie Station until 1952) was a railway station on the Edinburgh Suburban and Southside Junction Railway in Edinburgh, Scotland. It was opened on 1 December 1884 and served the Gorgie area of Edinburgh.

Gorgie East station closed in 1962, when passenger rail services were withdrawn from the Edinburgh Suburban line. There is now no trace of the station but the route continues to be used for freight services to this day, so freight trains avoid Edinburgh's main stations of Edinburgh Waverley and Haymarket, and occasionally diverted passenger trains also pass along this line. It was re-opened for one day on 21 May 1969 when a contingent of the Household Cavalry arrived by special trains, using the station.

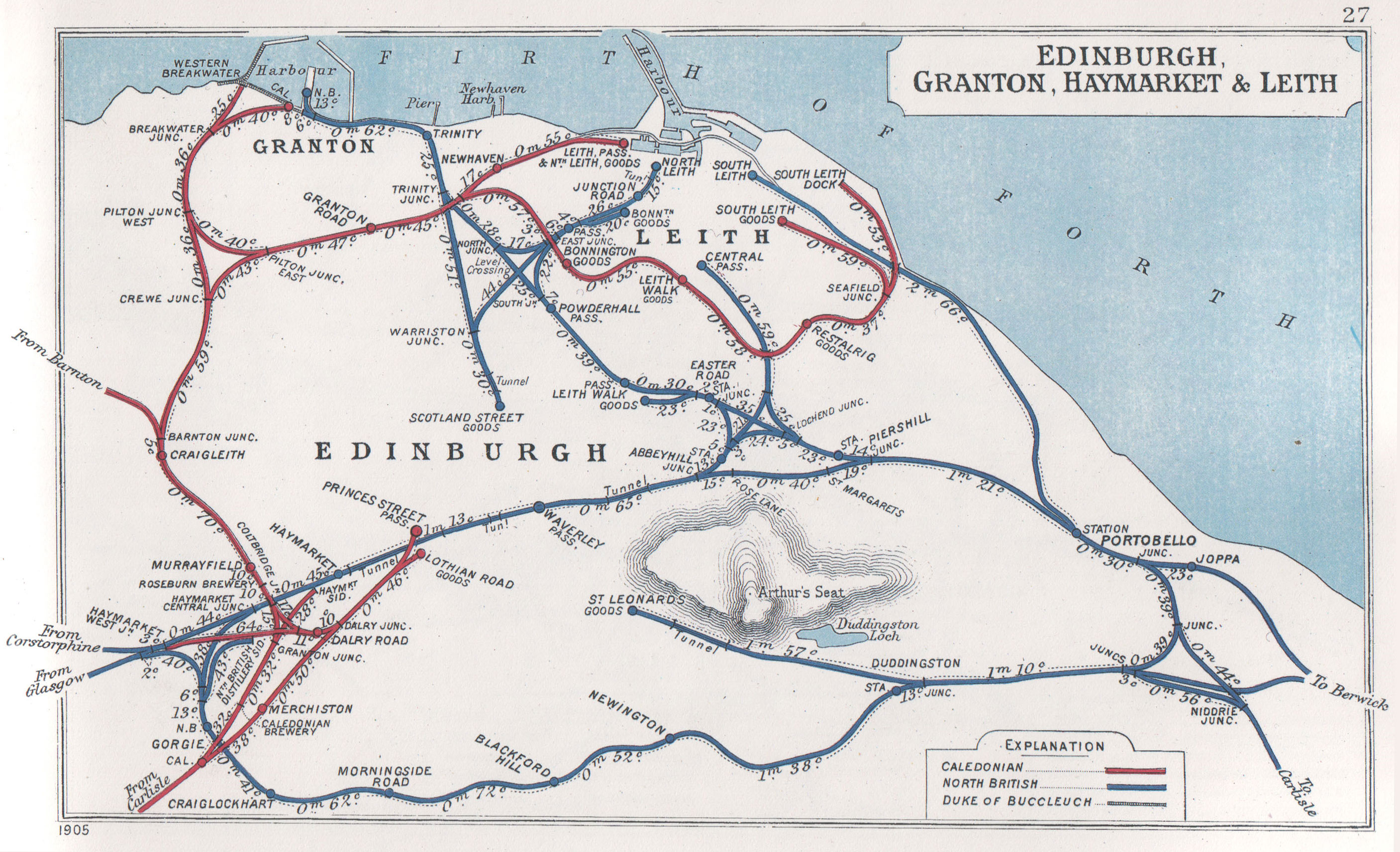
A 1905 Railway Clearing House diagram of Edinburgh railways, with the SSJR (in blue along the bottom)

== Future ==
A local campaigning group, the Capital Rail Action Group (CRAG), is running a campaign for the SSJR line to be re-opened to passenger services, and proposes that it should be operated either as a commuter rail service or as a light rail system to form an extension of the forthcoming Edinburgh Tram Network. Following a petition submitted to the Scottish Parliament in 2007, the proposal was rejected in 2009 by transport planners due to anticipated cost.

Preceding station	Historical railways	Following station
Craiglockhart; Line open, station closed	North British Railway; Edinburgh Suburban and Southside Junction Railway	Haymarket; Line and station open, no services on this line
