= Gorgie-Dalry =

Community council in Edinburgh, Scotland

Coordinates: 55°56′21″N 3°13′35″W

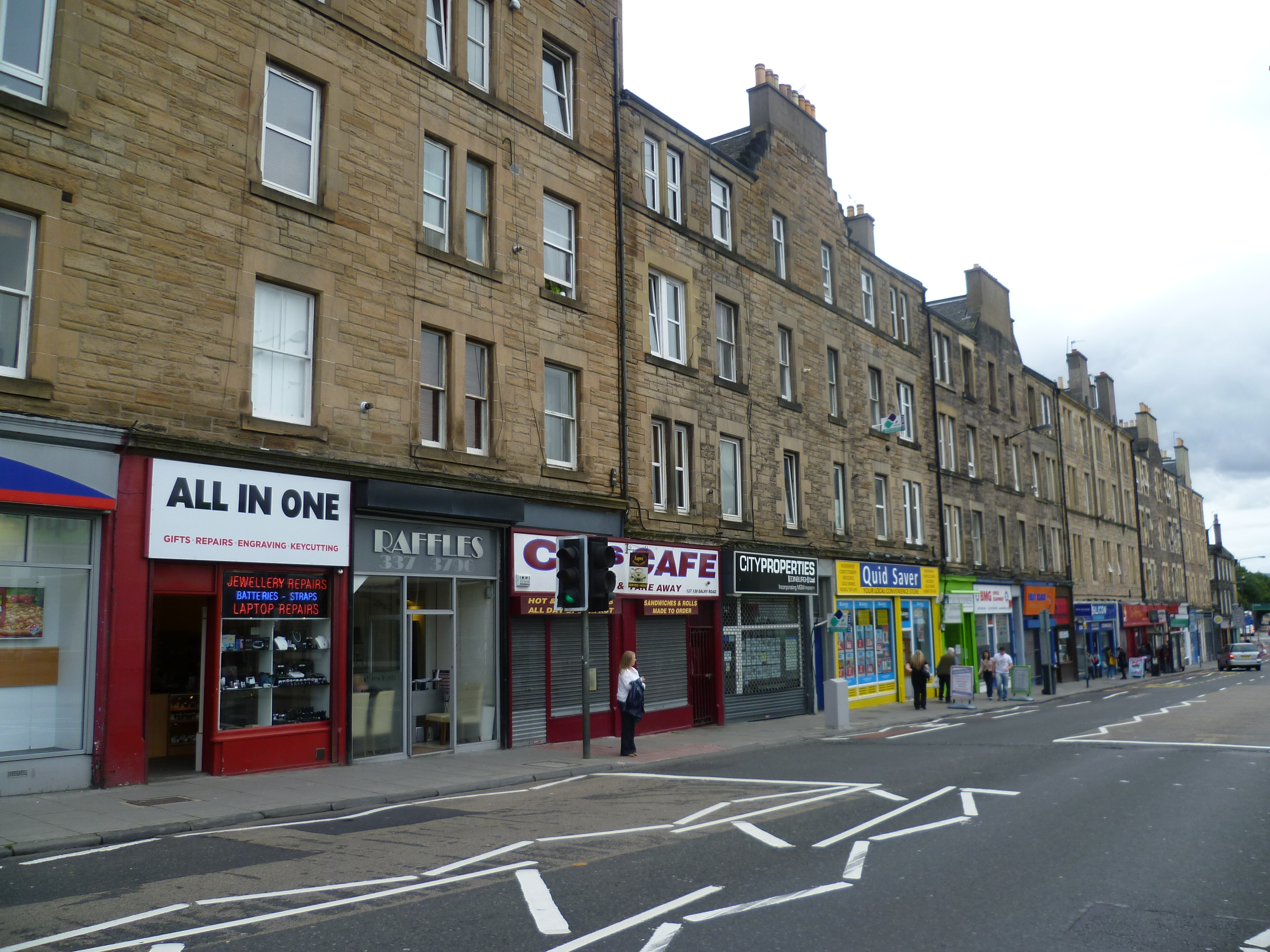
Dalry

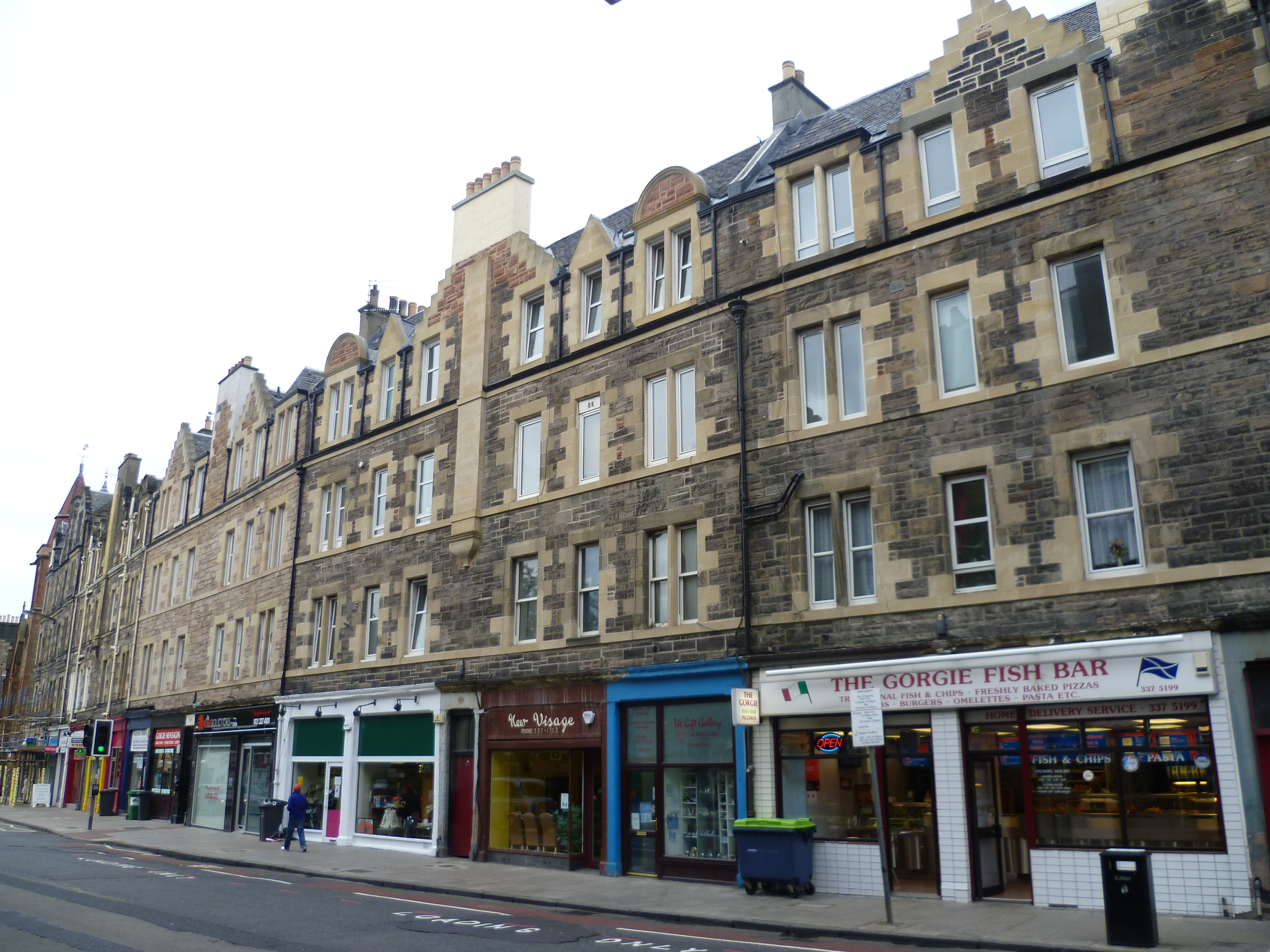
Gorgie

Gorgie-Dalry is the name given to the joint community council representing Gorgie and Dalry in the west of Edinburgh, the Scottish capital. The area also incorporates Tynecastle and parts of Ardmillan.
