= Morningside Road railway station =

Former railway station in Scotland

Coordinates: 55.9255°N 3.2104°W

Morningside Road
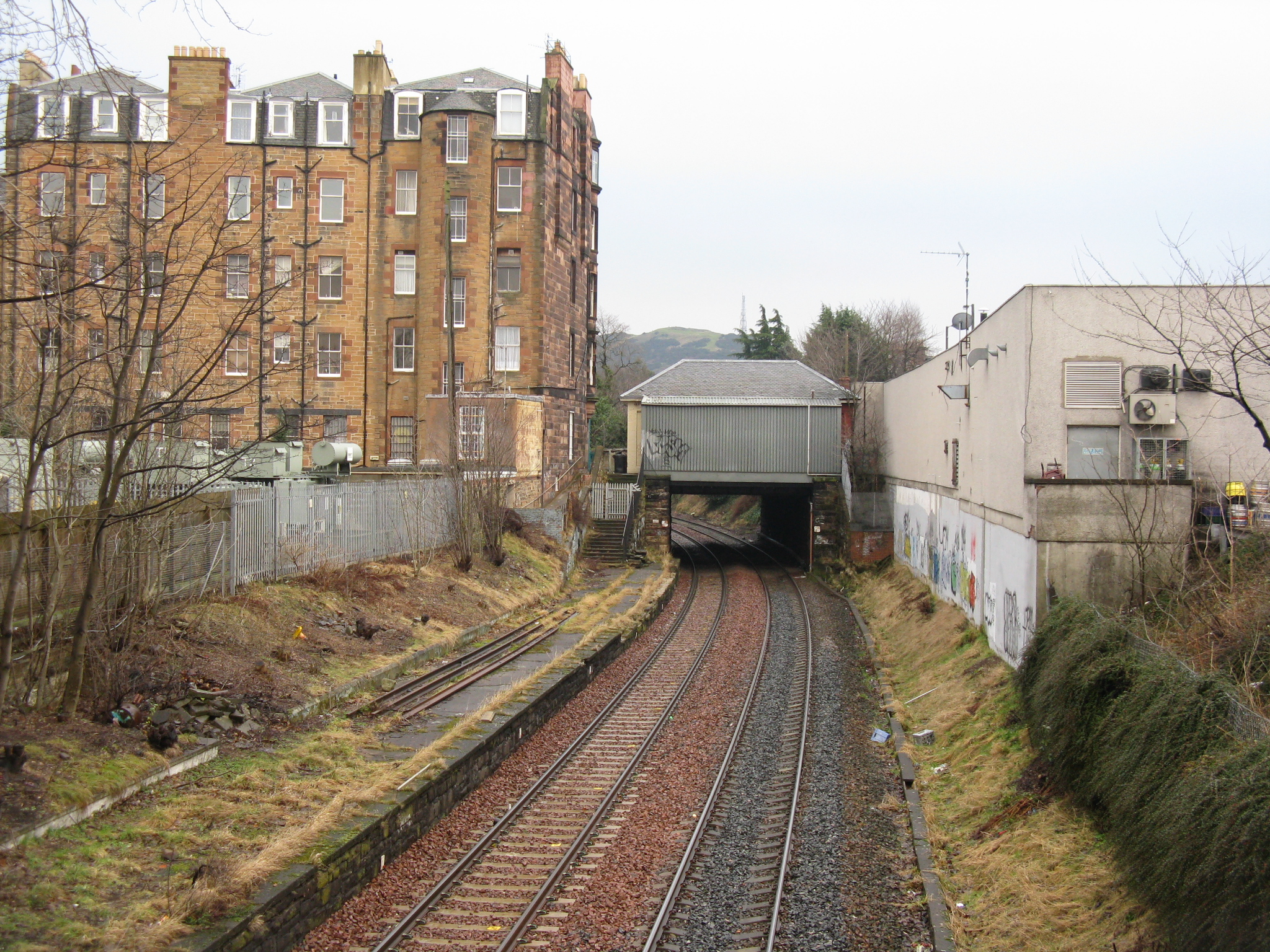
- The former platform at Morningside Road Station

General information
- Location: Morningside, City of Edinburgh; Scotland
- Platforms: 2

Other information
- Status: Disused

History
- Original company: Edinburgh Suburban and Southside Junction Railway
- Pre-grouping: North British Railway
- Post-grouping: London and North Eastern Railway

Key dates
- 1 December 1884: Opened as Morningside
- October 1886: Name changed to Morningside Road
- 10 September 1962: Station closed to passengers
Location
- Location within the City of Edinburgh council area

Morningside Road railway station is a former railway station in the Morningside area of Edinburgh, Scotland. Originally named Morningside Station, it was opened by the Edinburgh Suburban and Southside Junction Railway (ESSJR) in 1884 and closed to passengers in 1962. The station buildings still remain, and the railway track is still in use.

== History ==
The station was opened by the Edinburgh Suburban and Southside Junction Railway (ESSJR) on 1 December 1884 as Morningside Station.

After the ESSJR was incorporated into the North British Railway on 1 March 1885, the station was renamed Morningside Road in October 1886.

Morningside Road station closed in 1962, when passenger rail services were withdrawn from the Edinburgh Suburban line, although the line itself was retained for rail freight use. The route continues to be used for freight services to this day, and occasionally diverted passenger trains also pass through Morningside. As of 2022, Avanti West Coast use the line for some empty coaching stock moves between Edinburgh and Glasgow and CrossCountry had a daily passenger train from Glasgow to Edinburgh that stopped running in May of 2023.

== Location ==
The station was located by Morningside Road, where the road bridge crosses the suburban line, and was accessed via a gate on the west side of the road, opposite the Morningside Clock.

Today the station building has been converted for commercial use. The outer circle platform was removed to allow Mark 3 coaching stock to operate on the line. ScotRail has an advertising hoarding on the bridge next to the clock, where it displays posters advertising passenger rail services. The iron footbridge from the former station still stands to this day, connecting Maxwell Street to Balcarres Street.

Morningside Road station features

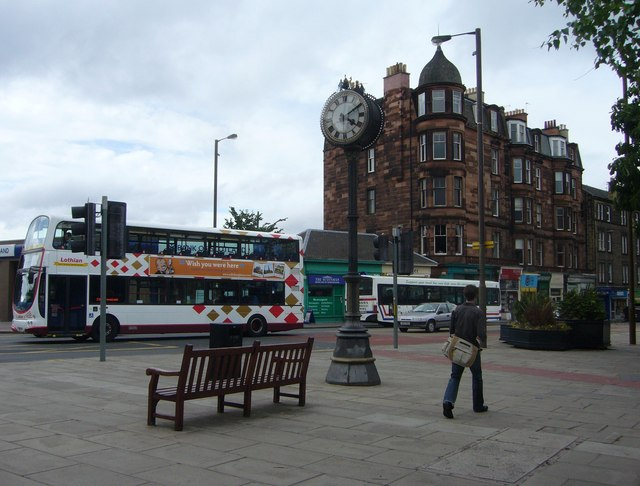
The old station clock on Morningside Road

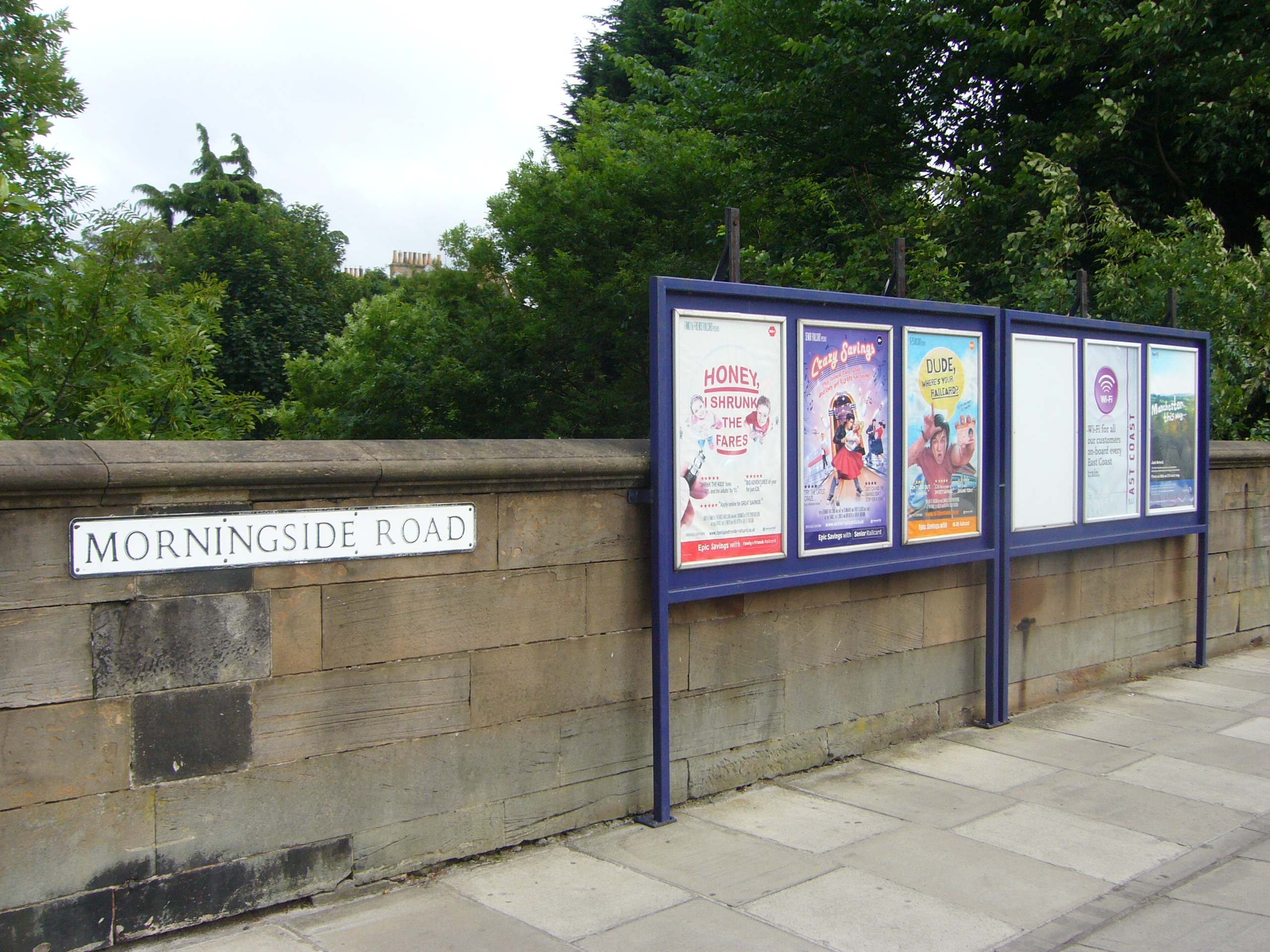
Railway advertising on the bridge over the tracks

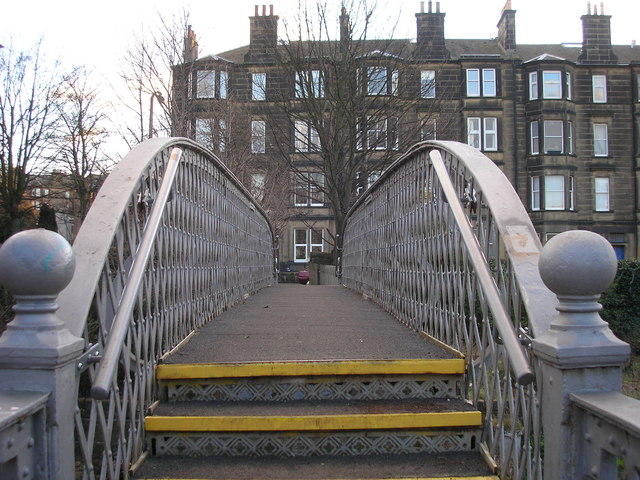
The old station footbridge

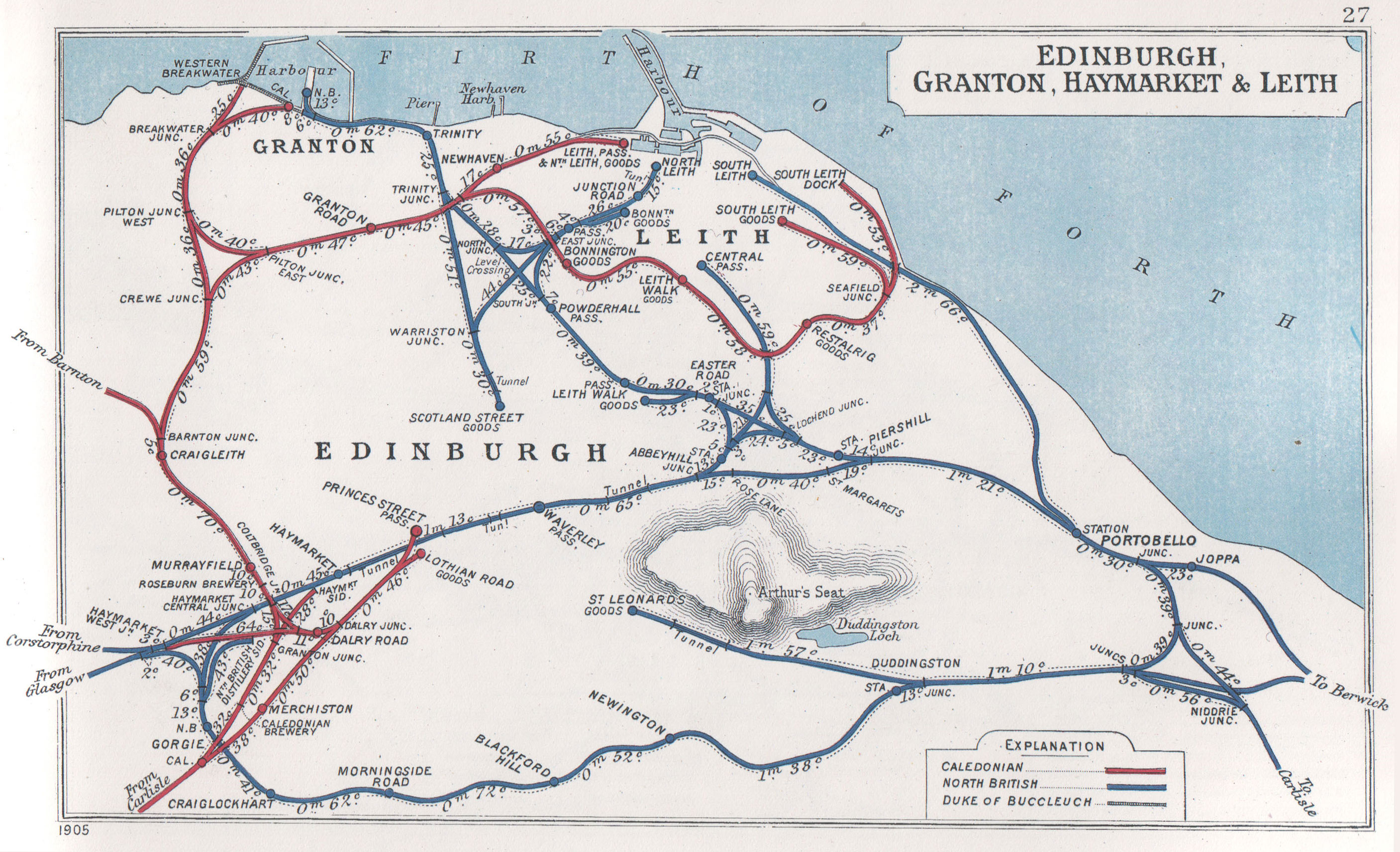
1914 Railway Junction Diagram showing Morningside Road in the south of the city

== Future ==
A local advocacy group, the Capital Rail Action Group (CRAG), is running a campaign for the SSJR line to be re-opened to passenger services, and proposes that it should be operated either as a commuter rail service or as a light rail system to form an extension of the Edinburgh Tram Network. Following a petition submitted to the Scottish Parliament in 2007, the proposal was rejected in 2009 by transport planners due to anticipated cost.

In February 2026, the City of Edinburgh Council announced that it was exploring the possibility of re-opening the SSJR line as part of the Edinburgh Trams network. The new proposals envisage operating the line using tram-trains, allowing the vehicles to operate on both the existing heavy rail network and on light rail street running mode. The proposals have not been confirmed and no reopening date has yet been specified.

Preceding station	Historical railways	Following station
Blackford Hill; Line open, station closed	North British Railway; Edinburgh Suburban Line	Craiglockhart; Line open, station closed
