= Newington railway station (Edinburgh) =

Former railway station in Scotland

Coordinates: 55.9310°N 3.1727°W

Newington station
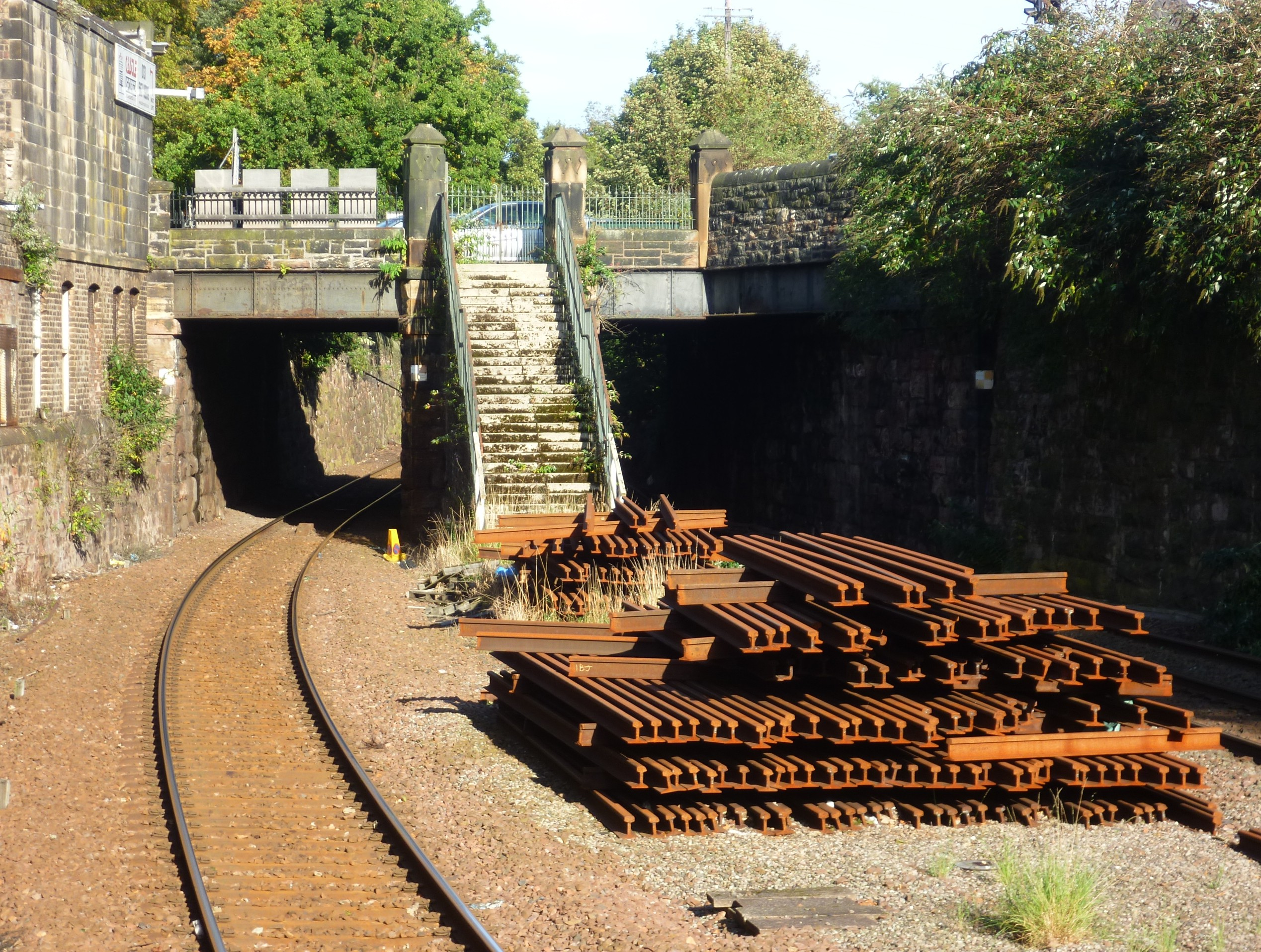
- Site of the former Newington station

General information
- Location: Newington, City of Edinburgh; Scotland
- Platforms: 2

Other information
- Status: Disused

History
- Original company: Edinburgh Suburban and Southside Junction Railway
- Pre-grouping: North British Railway
- Post-grouping: London and North Eastern Railway

Key dates
- 1 December 1884: Opened
- 10 September 1962: Station closed to passengers
Location
- Location within the City of Edinburgh council area

Newington Railway Station was a railway station in Edinburgh, Scotland, on the Edinburgh Suburban and Southside Junction Railway. It served the southern Edinburgh suburb of Newington and the station site is still visible from Craigmillar Park.

Newington station closed in 1962, when passenger rail services were withdrawn from the Edinburgh Suburban line although the line itself was retained for rail freight use. The route continues to be used for freight services to this day, so freight trains avoid Edinburgh's main stations of Edinburgh Waverley and Haymarket, and occasionally diverted passenger trains also pass along this line.

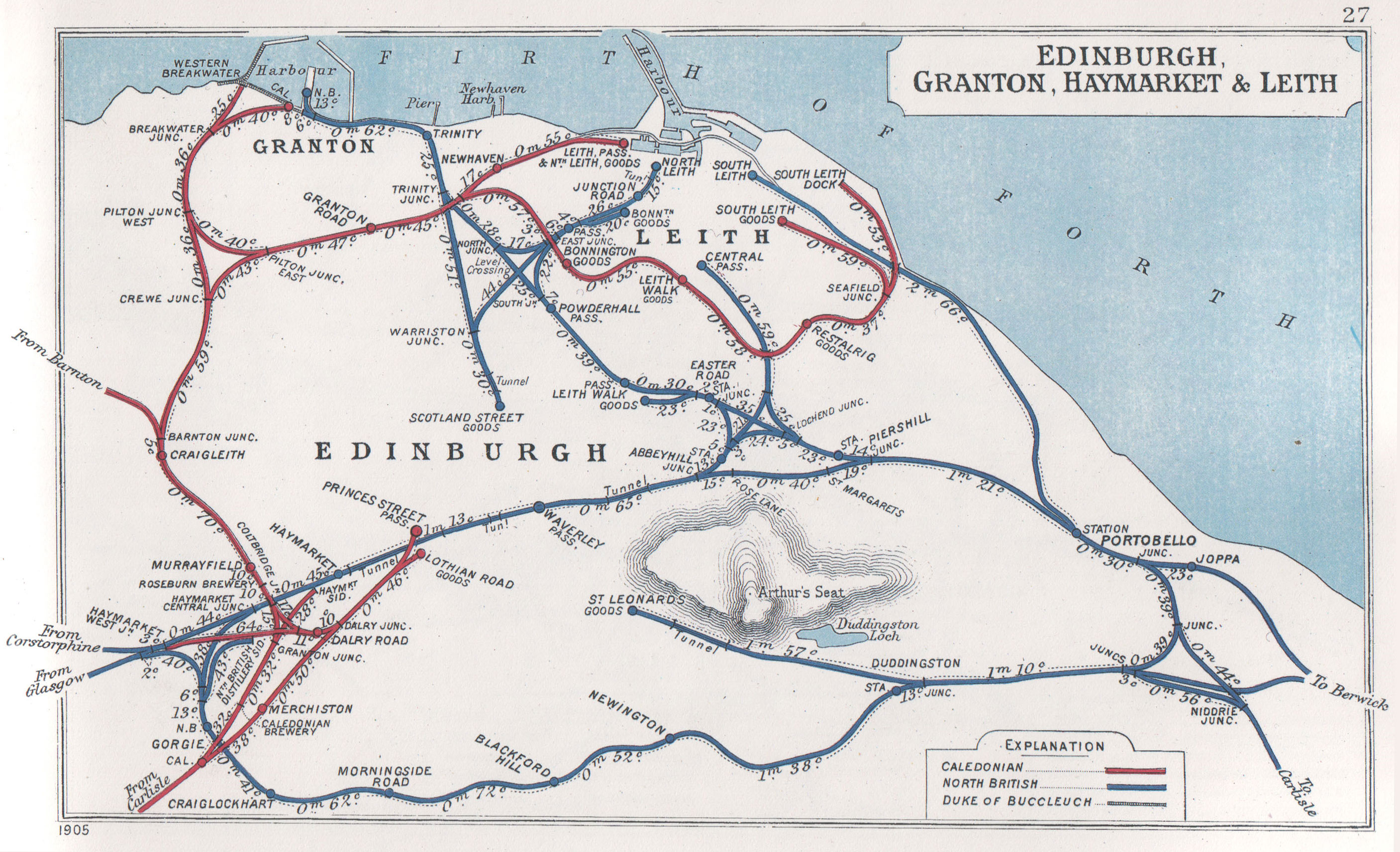
A 1905 Railway Clearing House diagram of Edinburgh railways, with the SSJR (in blue along the bottom)

== Future ==
A local campaigning group, the Capital Rail Action Group (CRAG), is running a campaign for the SSJR line to be re-opened to passenger services, and proposes that it should be operated either as a commuter rail service or as a light rail system to form an extension of the forthcoming Edinburgh Tram Network. Following a petition submitted to the Scottish Parliament in 2007, the proposal was rejected in 2009 by transport planners due to anticipated cost.

In February 2026, the City of Edinburgh Council announced that it was exploring the possibility of re-opening the SSJR line as part of the Edinburgh Trams network. The new proposals envisage operating the line using tram-trains, allowing the vehicles to operate on both the existing heavy rail network and on light rail street running mode. The proposals have not been confirmed and no reopening date has yet been specified.

| Preceding station | Historical railways | Following station |
|---|---|---|
| Duddingston & Craigmillar; Line open, station closed | North British Railway; Edinburgh Suburban Line | Blackford Hill; Line open, station closed |
