= Blackford Hill railway station =

Disused railway station in Newington, Edinburgh

Blackford Hill
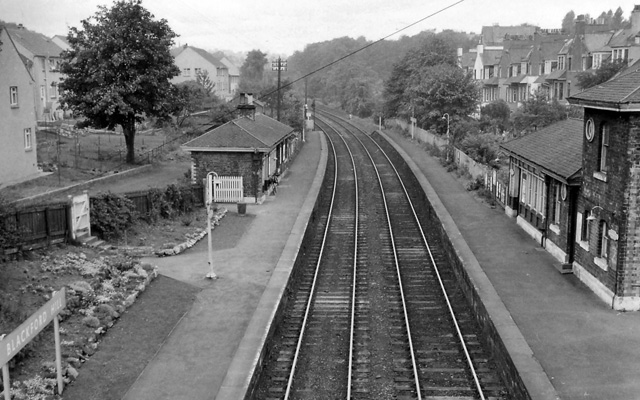
- Blackford Hill Station in 1962

General information
- Location: Newington, City of Edinburgh; Scotland
- Coordinates: 55.927232°N 3.1882577°W
- Grid reference: NT258711
- Platforms: 2

Other information
- Status: Disused

History
- Original company: Edinburgh Suburban and Southside Junction Railway
- Pre-grouping: North British Railway
- Post-grouping: London and North Eastern Railway

Key dates
- 1 December 1884: Opened
- 1 January 1917: Closed due to the wartime economy
- 1 February 1919: Re-opened
- 10 September 1962: Station closed to passengers
Location
- Location within the City of Edinburgh council area

Blackford Hill railway station was a railway station in the Blackford area of Edinburgh, Scotland. It was located at the foot of Blackford Hill on the Edinburgh Suburban and Southside Junction Railway (ESSJR). It was opened on 1 December 1884.

Blackford Hill station closed in 1962, when passenger rail services were withdrawn from the Edinburgh Suburban line although the line itself was retained for rail freight use. The route continues to be used for freight services to this day, so freight trains avoid Edinburgh's main stations of Edinburgh Waverley and Haymarket, and occasionally diverted passenger trains also pass along this line.

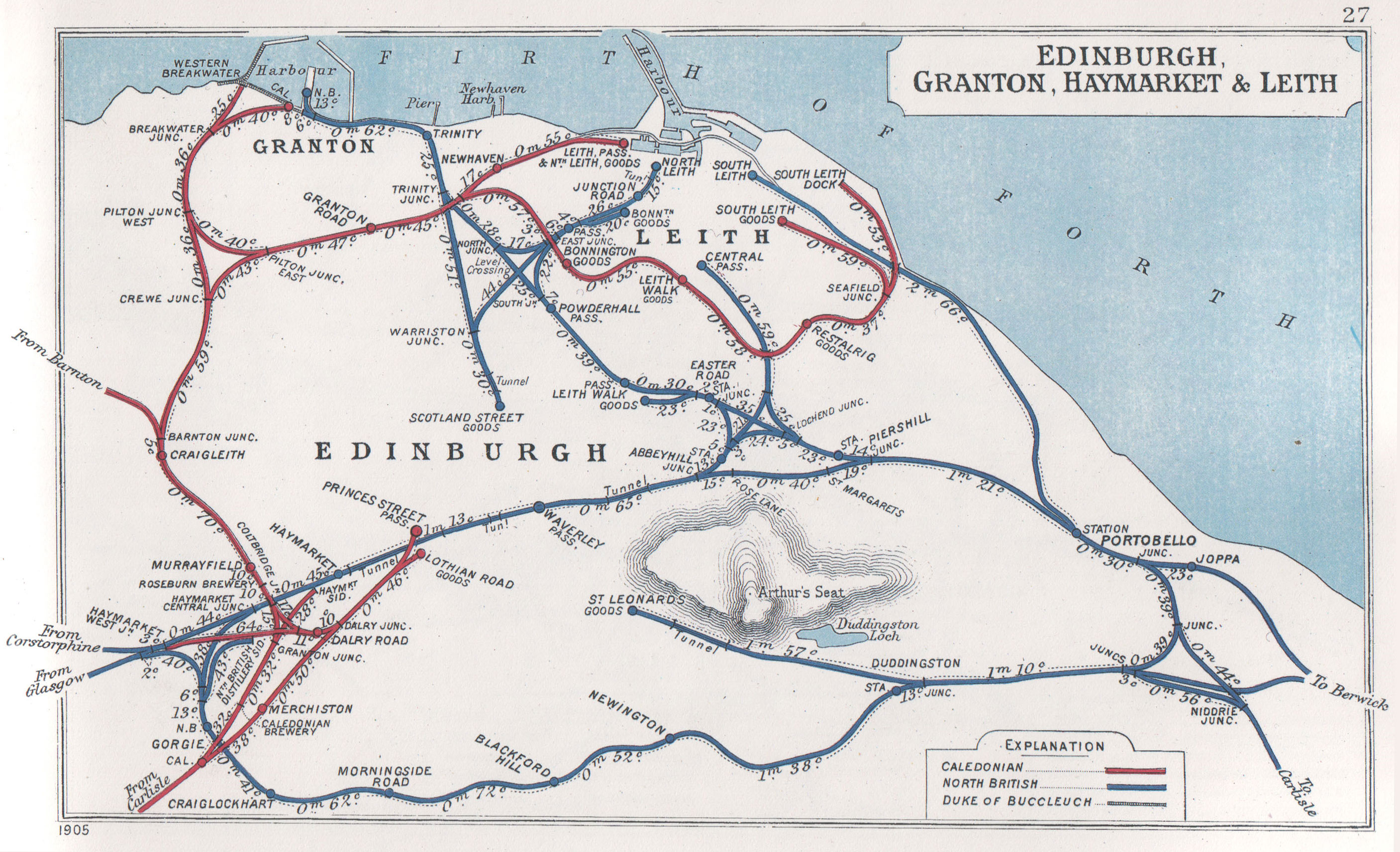
A 1905 Railway Clearing House diagram of Edinburgh railways, with the SSJR (in blue along the bottom)

== Future ==
A local campaigning group, the Capital Rail Action Group (CRAG), is running a campaign for the SSJR line to be re-opened to passenger services, and proposes that it should be operated either as a commuter rail service or as a light rail system to form an extension of the forthcoming Edinburgh Tram Network. Following a petition submitted to the Scottish Parliament in 2007, the proposal was rejected in 2009 by transport planners due to anticipated cost.

| Preceding station | Historical railways | Following station |
|---|---|---|
| Newington; Line open, station closed | North British Railway; Edinburgh Suburban Line | Morningside Road; Line open, station closed |
