= Gorgie Farm =

Urban farm in Gorgie, south-west Edinburgh

Coordinates: 55.938°N 3.229°W

Gorgie Farm, previously LOVE Gorgie Farm, was an urban farm in Gorgie, south-west Edinburgh.

Following the farm's closure in January 2023, the site's animals were transported to other local zoos and farms. There are ongoing plans to reopen the farm as a community-led venture.

== History ==
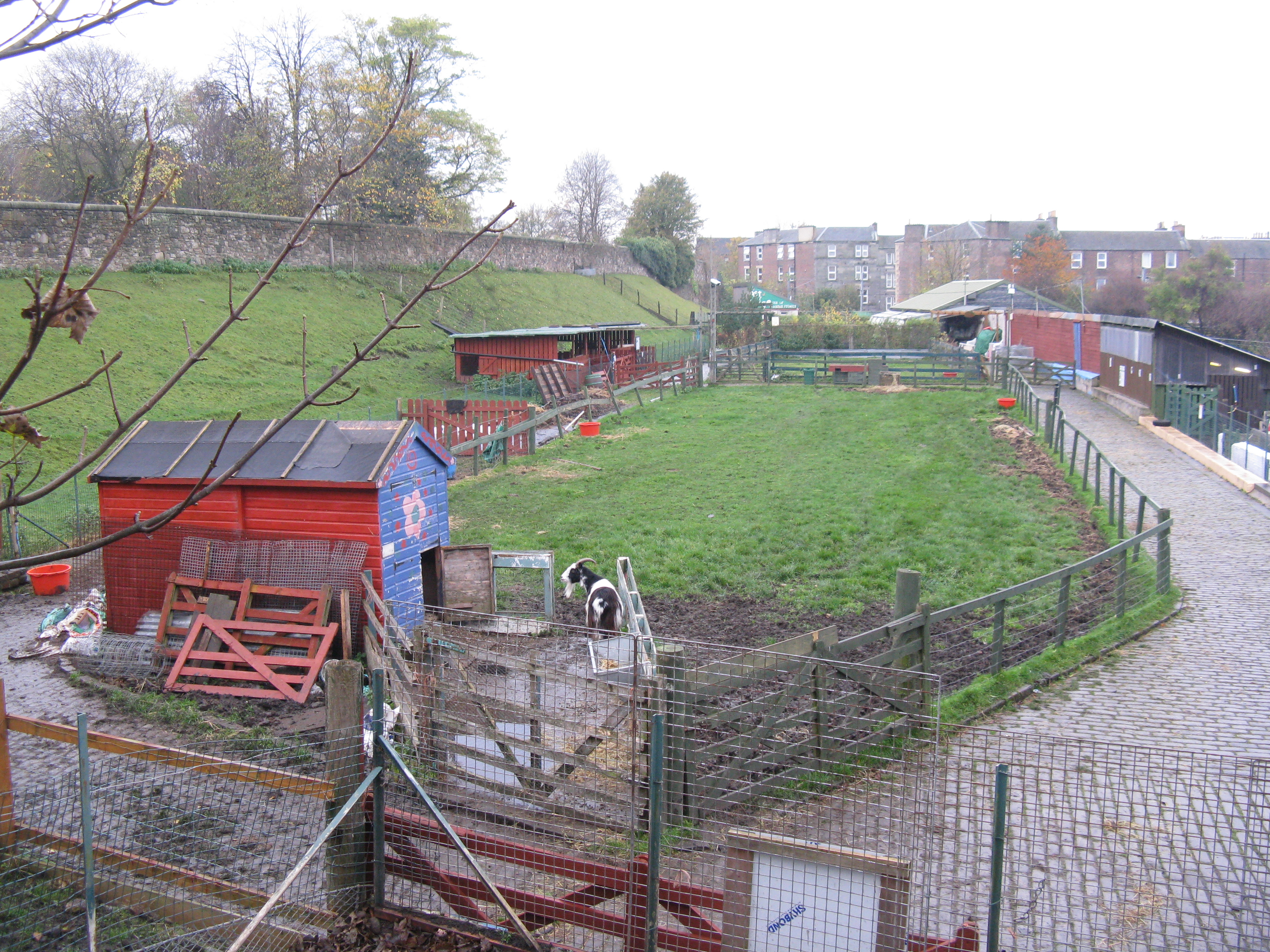
City Farm at Gorgie, 2011

It was established in the late 1970s by a community group that worked in clearing the derelict site and wanted to use the site as a green space for the community. The farm officially opened in 1982 as a working farm, selling lambs, pigs and was home of other animals, including cows, sheep and goats. The farm also has a small play park encouraging imagination led play. Since the farm opened, entry remained free but the organisation relied on donations to maintain the site and a grant by the City of Edinburgh Council which funded most staff wages.

In April 2016, Gorgie City Farm announced an urgent appeal as its rising costs and a reduction in external funding meant it had to turn to the community to help keep the farm open. The urban farm raised £100,000 within six weeks from local people and businesses, allowing the farm to keep running.

Queen Elizabeth II visited the farm on 4 July 2019. She met with staff, volunteers and other former collaborators whilst doing a guided tour around the animal facilities and gardens.

However, due to the lack of a robust business plan or additional revenue streams, the farm had to close and went under liquidation in November 2019, even after managing to raise a further £100,000.

=== LOVE Gorgie Farm ===
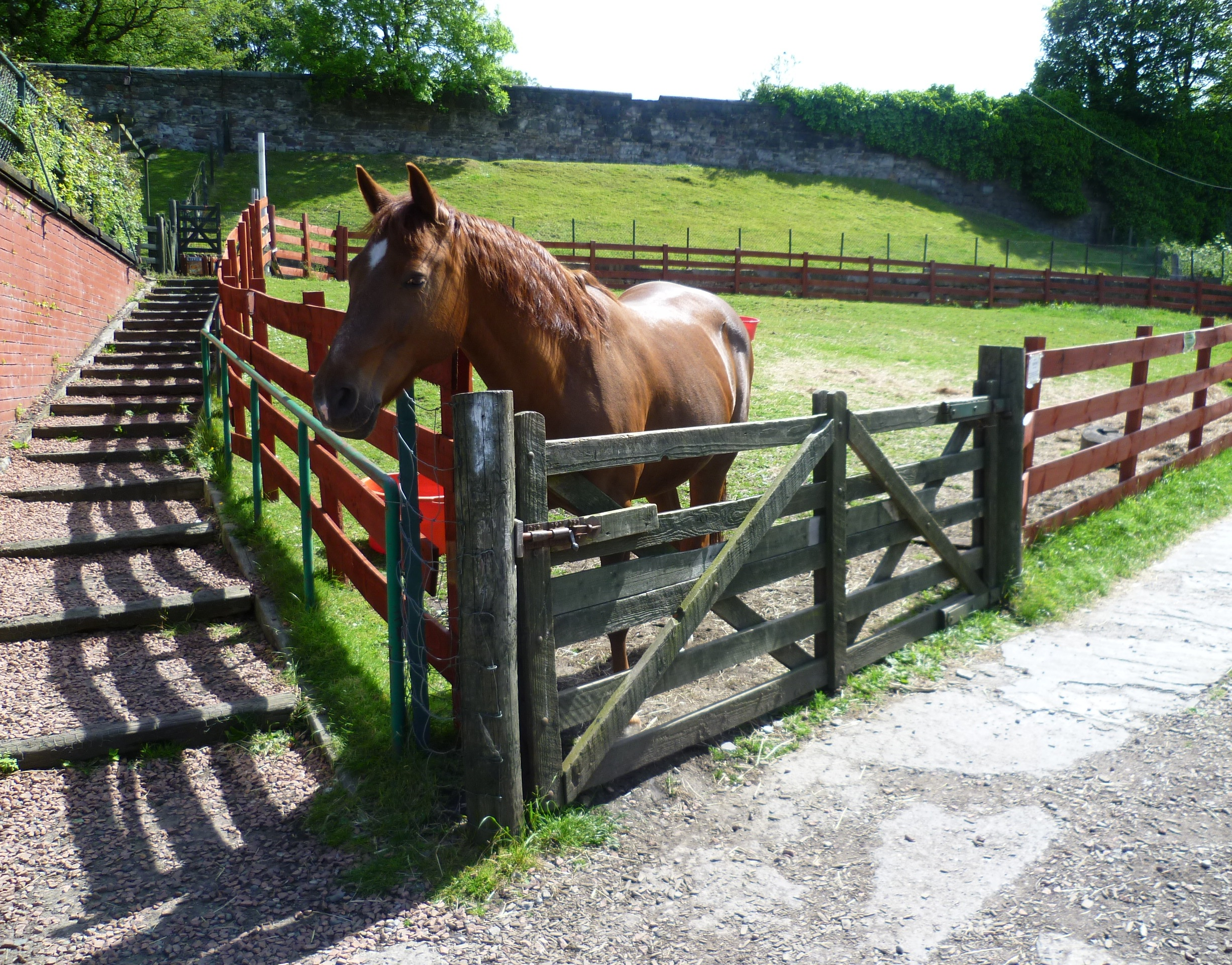
Red the Horse at Gorgie City Farm

The farm went to tender by the council and the funding was put on hold. Following a competitive tender process, LOVE Learning, an education and social care charity supporting vulnerable children and young people across Scotland were awarded the lease to run the farm. The farm reopened on 29 February 2020 under the new name of LOVE Gorgie Farm.

The funding raised by the community was given to LOVE Learning to continue the farm's work and to invest it into new projects like community support groups, education workshops and mental health programmes. The farm also had a food bank and reopened its social enterprise café. LOVE Gorgie Farm provides a range of professional apprenticeships and Scottish Qualifications Authority accredited programmes within its skills academy.

In March 2020, due to the COVID-19 outbreak and following the announcement that all sites had to close amid lockdown, LOVE Gorgie Farm closed temporarily. During lockdown, the farm acted as a focal point for the community by operating as a food bank and delivering free breakfast for children amid school closures. It also provided free pet boarding to those who were unwell or had to be temporarily admitted into hospital.

After being closed for four months, LOVE Gorgie Farm announced it would reopen on 29 June 2020 following the Scottish Government's guidance for zoos and animal parks to reopen.

In January 2023 the farm closed again with LOVE Learning terminating its lease due to a lack of funding.

=== Gorgie Community Farm ===
In September 2025 volunteers returned to the farm, established a board of trustees to oversee the site and rebranded to Gorgie Community Farm. Plans were made to ensure the site would not close down again, one of them being that the site would become a hub for multiple partners such as The Forge and Napiers. The farm is not currently open to the public but volunteer sessions are up on the Gorgie Community Farm website.
