= Edinburgh Suburban and Southside Junction Railway =

Former railway line in Scotland

Overview
- Status: Open
- Owner: Network Rail
- Locale: Edinburgh, Scotland, UK
- Termini: Edinburgh Waverley (loop)

Service
- System: National Rail

History
- Opened: 31 October 1884; 142 years ago
- Closed: 10 September 1962; 64 years ago (to local passenger services)

Technical
- Track gauge: 4 ft 8 1/2 in (1,435 mm)

The Edinburgh Suburban and Southside Junction Railway (ES&SJR) was a railway company that built an east–west railway (known as the Edinburgh Suburban Line or more familiarly the Sub) on the southern margin of Edinburgh, Scotland, primarily to facilitate the operation of heavy goods and mineral traffic across the city. The line opened in 1884. Although its route was rural at the time, suburban development quickly caught up and passenger carryings on the line were buoyant; the passenger service operated on a circular basis through Edinburgh Waverley railway station.

Bus and tram competition hit the passenger service badly as the twentieth century progressed, and in 1962 the line closed to local passenger trains. It continues in use for freight traffic and diverted and excursion passenger trains.

There have frequently been proposals to reintroduce the local passenger service on the line, but as of 2024 there is no active commitment to do so.

== History ==
=== Railway traffic through Edinburgh ===
The Edinburgh and Glasgow Railway (E&GR) opened its main line in 1842 between Glasgow and the station at Edinburgh that became Haymarket, at the western margin of the city. It showed that longer-distance railways could be successful, and encouraged the idea of connecting central Scotland with England; the North British Railway (NBR) opened its line from the station at North Bridge in Edinburgh to Berwick (later known as Berwick-upon-Tweed) in 1846, and within a few weeks the E&GR opened an extension from Haymarket to its own station at North Bridge. There was a link for the transfer of wagons, but for the time being the two companies operated separate stations adjacent to one another.

Meanwhile, the Caledonian Railway was constructing its line from Edinburgh to Glasgow and Carlisle, running from Lothian Road station, and opening in 1847 - 1848. (The Caledonian later relocated to Princes Street station.)

The Caledonian line remained separate, and later a serious competitor, but the E&GR and the NBR were obviously complementary. The North Bridge station was extremely rudimentary at first and the two companies collaborated in improving it and making a shared station, and it was later renamed Waverley Station. Nonetheless, the site was extremely cramped and for many years the accommodation was notoriously inadequate.

In 1865 the E&GR and the NBR amalgamated, keeping the name North British Railway, and the opening of branch lines had led to substantially heavier traffic. The line through Waverley station was the only link between the lines east and west of Edinburgh. (Note: It was possible to exchange individual wagons between the NBR and Caledonian systems at Granton.) Mineral traffic increased considerably as the Lothian coalfield (south-east of Edinburgh) was developed, and much of the extracted mineral was consigned to the west of Scotland for shipment. All the goods and mineral traffic had to pass along the double track route from Portobello to Haymarket through Waverley station, finding a path between the increasingly frequent passenger services.

=== First proposals ===
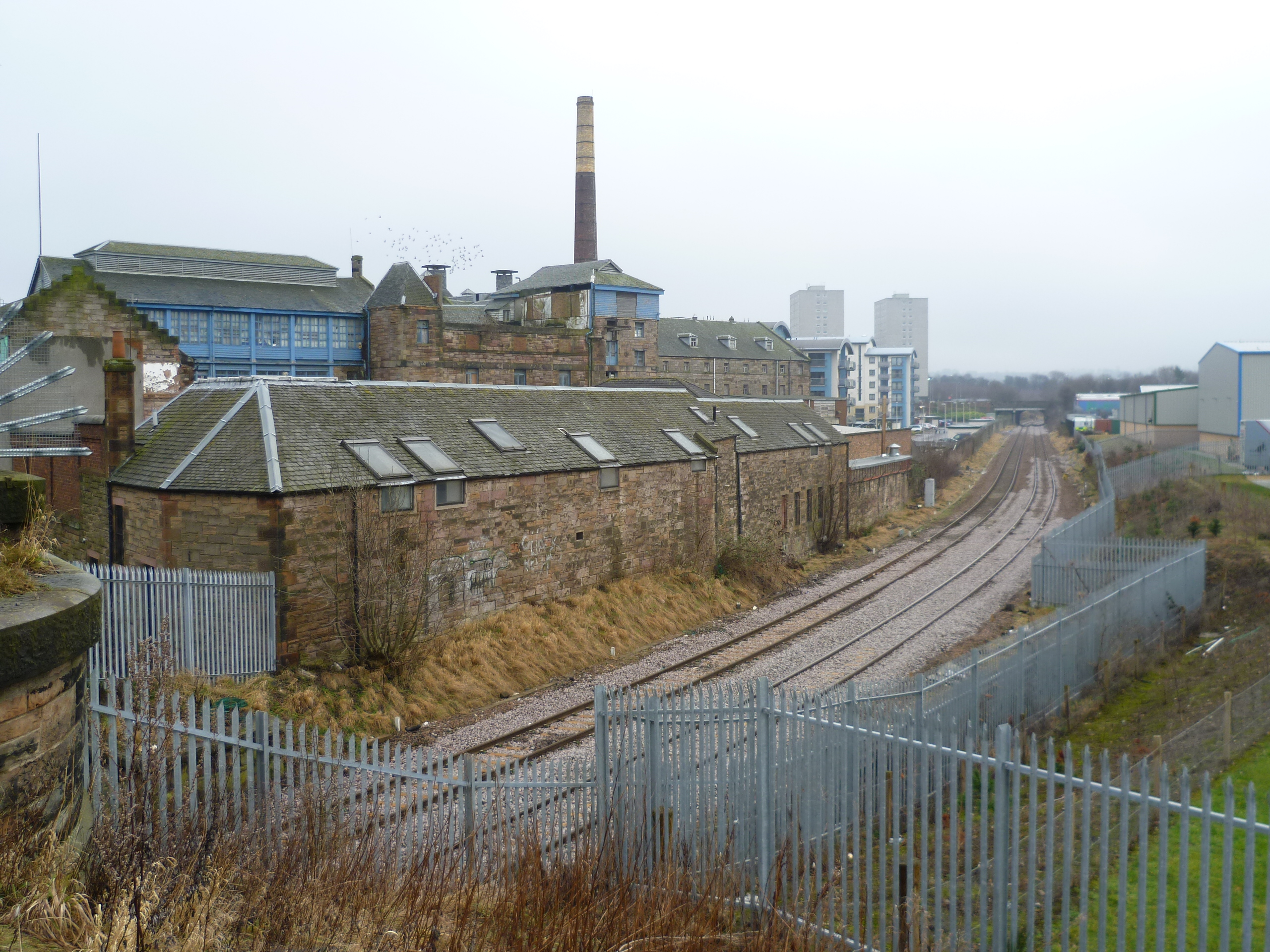
The line at Duddingston Road West, Craigmillar

The congestion was obviously serious, with no apparent solution on the route through Waverley. The line lay in a valley between very high ground on an east–west alignment, and any railway by-passing Waverley would have to be aligned south of the volcanic plug that forms Salisbury Crags and Arthur's Seat. In 1865 the NBR proposed a line from Haymarket to connect with the former Edinburgh and Dalkeith Railway near its terminus on the south side of the city. The Dalkeith line, now in NBR control, connected near Niddrie (often spelt Niddry at the time) with the NBR main line to Berwick and the Dalkeith route to the mineral fields. The Caledonian Railway too saw this as an opportunity to secure an advantage over its rival, and in the same year it too proposed a similar route from its own lines near Gorgie to Niddrie, intending to claim running powers over the NBR lines to get access to the Lothian coal fields. However, neither of these schemes was progressed.

=== An act for the ES&SJR ===
Over the following years the congestion and the difficulty of working through Waverley station increased further, and the proposed construction of the Forth Bridge from 1871, promising much more traffic to the NBR at Edinburgh, intensified the perception that a resolution must be implemented. A parliamentary bill was prepared by the North British Railway, although the line was to be built by a nominally independent company.

Edinburgh Suburban and Southside Junction Railway Act 1880
- Act of Parliament
- Parliament of the United Kingdom
- Long title: An Act to authorise the construction of the Edinburgh Suburban and Southside Junction Railway; and for other purposes.
- Citation: 43 & 44 Vict. c. cxciv

Dates
- Royal assent: 26 August 1880

Text of statute as originally enacted

The engineer Thomas Bouch was engaged to design a route (Note: It was his last railway; he died before the act of Parliament was obtained.) from the complex of lines west of Haymarket to Portobello, and based on his work, an authorising act of Parliament for the Edinburgh Suburban and Southside Junction Railway was given royal assent as the Edinburgh Suburban and Southside Junction Railway Act 1880 (43 & 44 Vict. c. cxciv) on 26 August 1880. (Note: Southside was written as one word, not South Side.) The capital was to be £22,500, and the NBR was to work the line for 50% of gross receipts.

The line was to be nearly seven miles (11 km) in length from a triangular junction near Haymarket to a triangular junction near Portobello. Portobello was being developed at this time as a marshalling location for goods and mineral traffic destined for points west of Edinburgh; for the time being this included traffic for the train ferry at Granton. The Caledonian objected to the bill, and succeeded in getting three connecting spurs near Gorgie inserted into the act, although these were never constructed.

Edinburgh Suburban and Southside Junction Railway Act 1882
- Act of Parliament
- Parliament of the United Kingdom
- Long title: An Act to authorise the Edinburgh Suburban and Southside Junction Railway Company to construct new Railways and to abandon part of their authorised Railways and for other purposes.
- Citation: 45 & 46 Vict. c. cxlvii

Dates
- Royal assent: 24 July 1882

Text of statute as originally enacted

However the Tay Bridge disaster of December 1879 fatally undermined confidence in Bouch's work, and the proprietors of the new Company decided to have the engineering design of the line reviewed, and this was done by George Trimble. A revised bill was submitted to the 1882 session of Parliament and this gained royal assent as the Edinburgh Suburban and Southside Junction Railway Act 1882 (45 & 46 Vict. c. cxlvii) on 24 July 1882. Capital was £225,000. Instead of running independently to Portobello, the line was now to adopt the old Edinburgh and Dalkeith Railway route, and double the track, from near Duddingston to Niddrie, continuing to Portobello, and also provide additional spurs towards Dalkeith.

Although intended primarily for goods and mineral traffic, the topography of the route forced the inclusion of significant gradients, climbing at 1 in 88 westbound and 1 in 60 eastbound to Morningside. There was considered to be limited potential for local passenger traffic on the line; most of the route was remote and rural. It was hoped that the passenger traffic would build up over time.

=== Construction and opening ===
Construction of the suburban line, conducted primarily by contractors John Waddell and Sons, began in August 1881. There were initially difficulties in agreeing the scope of the works, as the Company included station and other works beyond the scope in which Waddell had tendered. Nonetheless, the work proceeded satisfactorily, and it was anticipated that the line would be ready for the opening planned for the beginning of July 1884. However the roof of the tunnel under the Union Canal collapsed on 13 November 1883 causing alarm at first. The collapse turned out to be not as serious as at first thought, and the structure was stabilised by 20 December 1883.

The actual cost of the line was relatively low, although in 1882 the Merchant Company of Edinburgh (governors of George Watson's Hospital) presented the company with a claim for £23,368.10/-, to cover the cost of the land upon which the suburban line was being built, as well as rectification works.

On 1 October 1884 the directors felt ready to request the Board of Trade inspection that was necessary for opening to passenger traffic, but as that could not be arranged immediately, the Company opened the line for goods and mineral traffic on 31 October 1884. An inspection train for the officers of the North British Railway traversed the line on 16 October 1884.

Major Marindin of the Board of Trade inspected the line on 15 November 1884 and approved the line for passenger operation, and it duly opened to passengers on 1 December 1884. (Note: From Maclean, page 26; there is some difficulty about the date of the approval letter. He states that the Board of Trade wrote on 15 November but that the letter was received by the Company on 11 December, after the opening to passengers took place on 1 December 1884.)

=== First operations ===
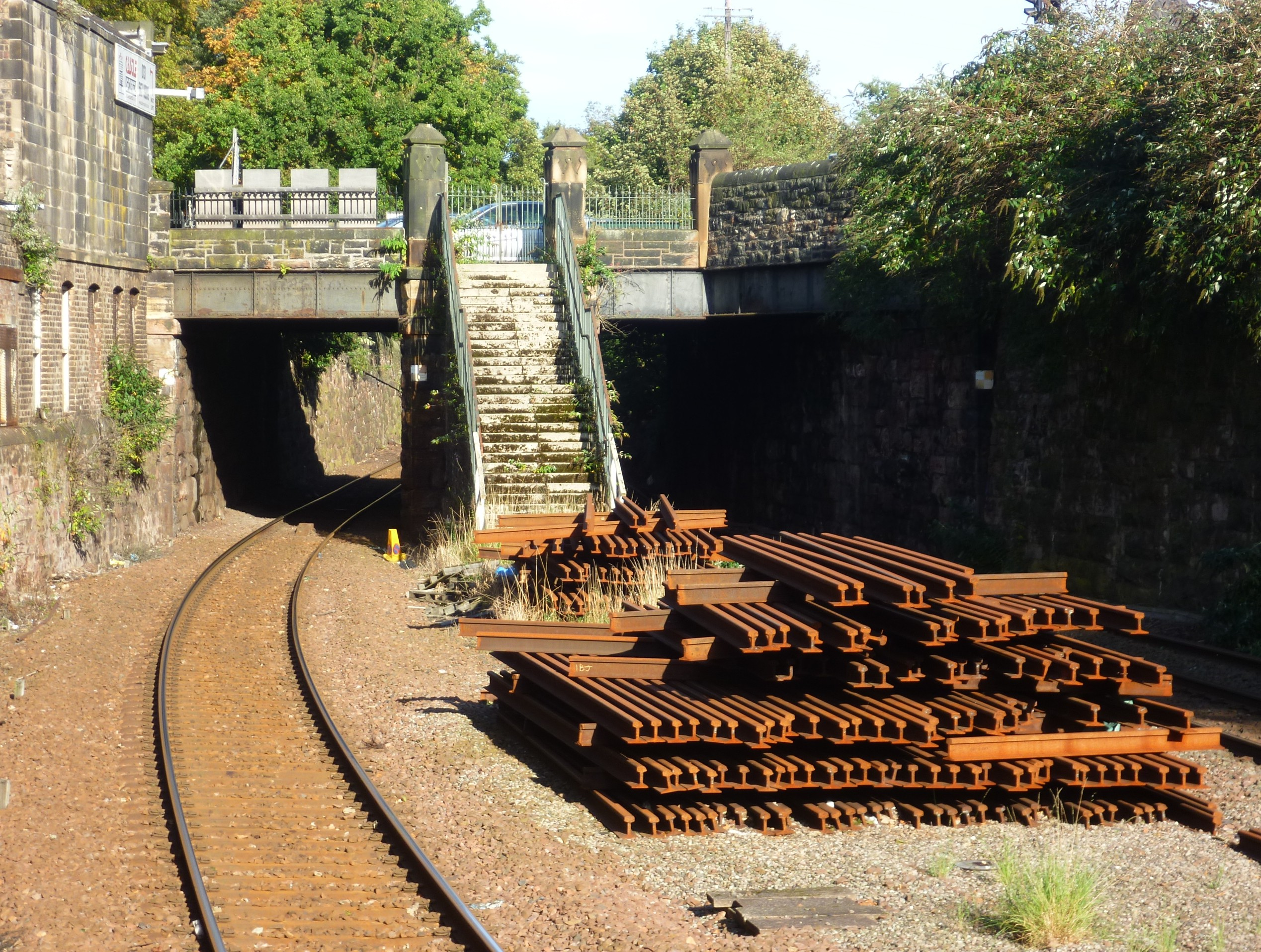
The former Newington station with an island platform.

The heavy goods and mineral traffic was diverted to the line immediately. The passenger service was an hourly circular route from Waverley, referred to as the outer circle (clockwise) and the inner circle. Stations at first were provided at Duddingston, Newington, Blackford Hill, Morningside and Gorgie, (Note: Gorgie is omitted from MacLean's list of opening stations.) and tickets were available in either direction, that is, intending passengers could catch the first train, whether inner or outer circle.

Station names were later changed and the route at Portobello varied. A basic additional platform was provided at Waverley to handle the trains, but it was not until a decade later that a more comprehensive facility was provided.

In accordance with the North British Railway's intention from the outset, the ES&SJR was absorbed by the NBR effectively from 1 May 1885, ratified by the North British Railway Act 1885 (48 & 49 Vict. c. cxix) of 22 July 1885.

=== Passenger service developments ===
The primary purpose of building the line had been the provision of a by-pass route for goods and mineral trains, but usage of the circle passenger service developed better than had been expected. Craiglockhart station on the suburban line was opened on 1 June 1887.

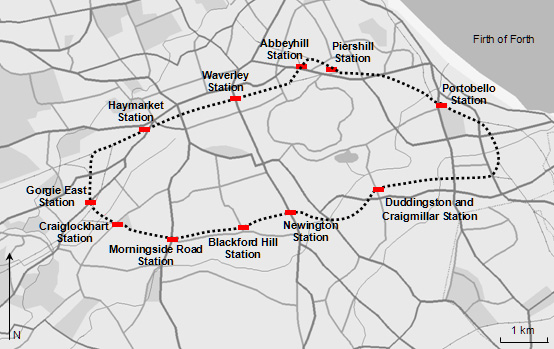
The route of the Suburban Circle passenger trains after 1891

Suburban development was taking place elsewhere, and a curve was installed at Abbeyhill on the fork of the lines to Leith, opening on 1 October 1886. This enabled the suburban circle passenger trains to divert off the main line and make a station call at Abbeyhill from that date. A station was opened at Piershill on the Leith branch just off the main line, on 1 May 1891.

Craiglockhart station was closed temporarily from 1 May 1890 when a temporary station the other side of the Union Canal was opened in connection with the Edinburgh Exhibition of that year. Use of the original Craiglockhart station resumed on 1 January 1891.

=== Tramway competition ===
Edinburgh's first trams were horse-drawn; they began operation on 6 November 1871, and ran between Haymarket and Leith. The following year saw the establishment of the circle route, which ran via Marchmont and Church Hill to the West End of Princes Street; the fare was one penny, or two pence for a return. In 1881 and 1882 steam engine hauled trams were tried out at Portobello, but they were unsuccessful. From 1888 cable operated trams were introduced: they were hauled by a wire rope in a conduit under the road surface. (Note: The cable system remained in use until 1922: Britain's largest and longest-lived cable tramway system.) By the turn of the twentieth century, Edinburgh's cable car system had increased to include 200 cars, servicing 25 route-miles of track.

Edinburgh's first electric trams ran experimentally between Ardmillan Terrace and Slateford (Note: Anderson, page 46; typo for Slateford?) in 1910. For some time the City Council enforced legal constraints on conversion of existing cable-worked sections to electric traction, but by 1923 the conversion was substantially complete. At the same time there was a considerable increase in bus services to outer suburban locations, and the convenience of tram and bus travel posed a massive challenge to passenger services on the Suburban Line.

=== Quadrupling west of Waverley ===
In 1895 the main line from Waverley station to Corstorphine Junction (later Saughton Junction, where the Queensferry line diverged) was quadrupled.

=== The twentieth century ===
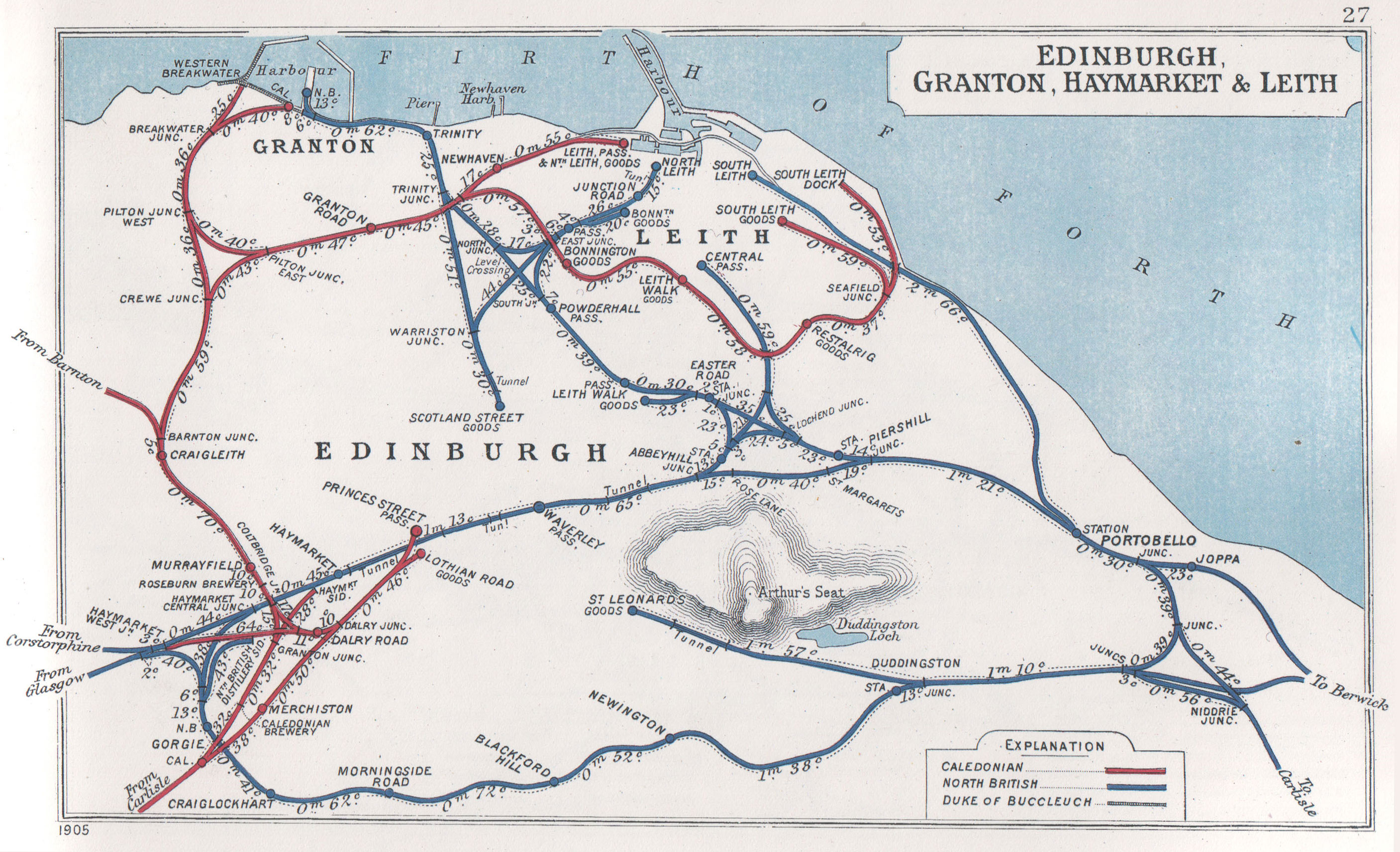
A 1905 Railway Clearing House diagram of Edinburgh railways, with the ES&SJR in blue along the bottom

On 1 July 1903 the Leith Central branch opened, serving large areas of northern suburbs. The Edinburgh Suburban Line trains were diverted to use Leith Central as their eastern terminus, connections being provided at Portobello for journeys from the eastern area of the Suburban Line to Waverley.

During World War I Craiglockhart and Blackford Hill stations were closed from January 1917.

At the end of the independent existence of the North British Railway, twelve passenger trains ran each way on the Suburban Line each weekday. The railways of Great Britain were grouped in 1923, following the Railways Act 1921 and the North British Railway was a constituent of the new London and North Eastern Railway (LNER).

In 1942 multiple aspect colour light signals were installed on the line, resulting in a saving in manpower.

The railways were nationalised in 1948, and the LNER lines locally became part of the Scottish Region of British Railways. A marked change in the routing of coal from the Lothian coalfields took place now: instead of running over the Edinburgh Suburban line it ran via Granton and Crewe Junction, a considerable detour.

In 1949 a report entitled the Civic Survey and Plan for Edinburgh was presented. As well as development of road and air links, the report proposed that a new line by-passing Waverley station should be built by extending from the St Leonards terminus of the original Edinburgh and Dalkeith line, doubling its approach railway, and tunnelling forward under the Meadows to emerge at a new two-level station at Morrison Street near Haymarket. Waverley was to be reduced to a "passing" station, handling only traffic local to the city. While many of the report's recommendations took effect, the railway proposals were too ambitious and nothing further was done.

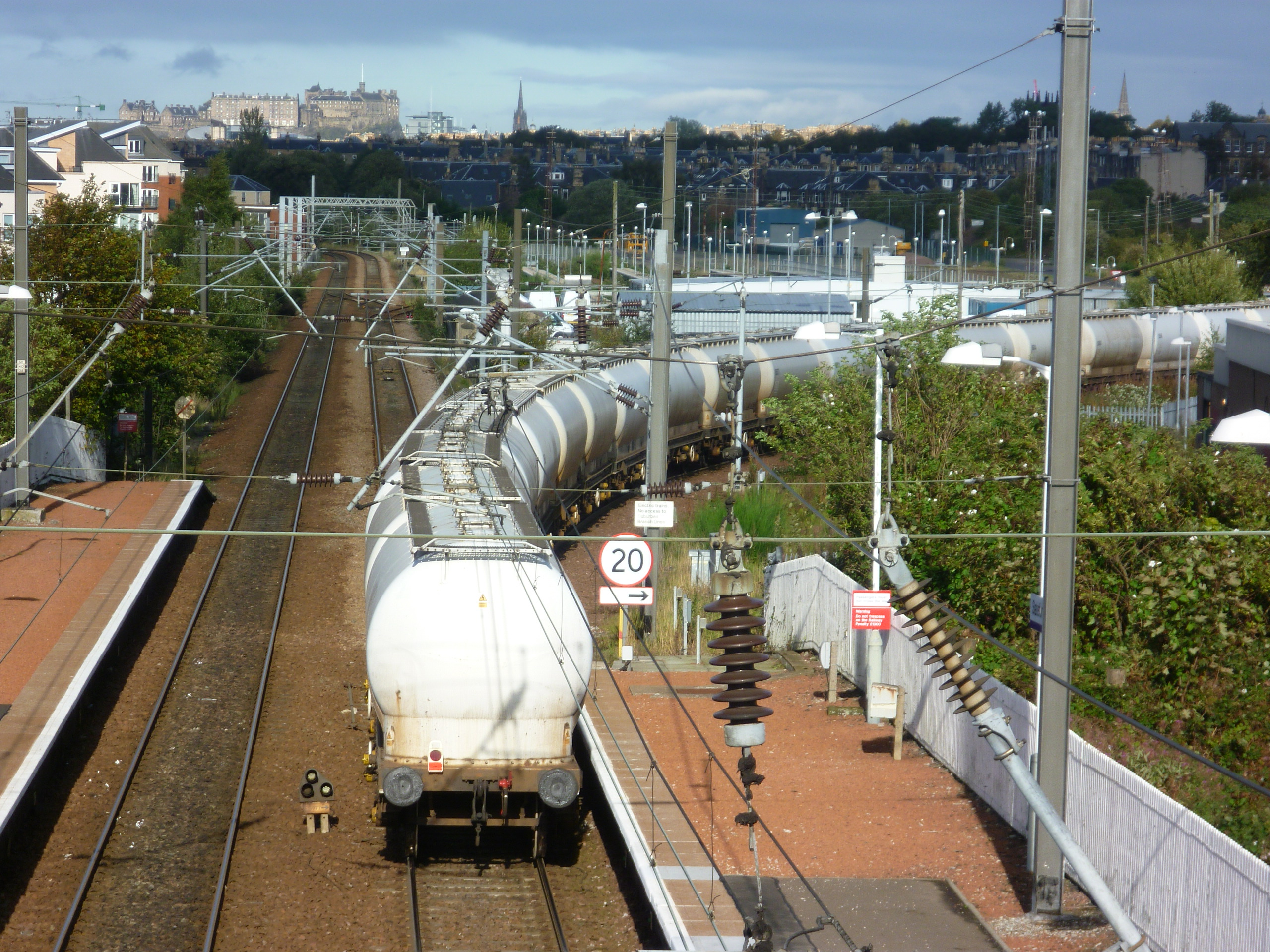
A freight train at Slateford on the former Caledonian Railway main line, running on to the 1960 loop towards the Suburban Line

In 1960 a spur, the Craiglockhart Loop, was opened connecting the former Caledonian route at Slateford, with the Edinburgh Suburban line at Craiglockhart; this enabled trains from the Carstairs direction to run direct towards Niddrie and vice versa; previously such movements had still to run via Edinburgh Waverley. The spur cost £700,000, and was authorised by the British Transport Commission Order Confirmation Act 1955 (4 & 5 Eliz. 2. c. i).

Diesel multiple unit operation on the suburban line was introduced on 9 June 1958. However the costs of operating a passenger service considerably exceeded the income, and on 10 September 1962 the local passenger service was withdrawn.

The suburban line continued to be maintained to passenger standards as it was used for through services on diversion. Princes Street, the former Caledonian Railway Edinburgh terminus, was closed on Sundays from 20 May 1962 and the trains on that line reached Waverley by way of the Slateford spur and the suburban line.

In the early 1960s a major modernisation of the handling of wagonload freight took place, when Millerhill Marshalling Yard was constructed. Located on the east side of the city on the Waverley route; the Up Yard opened in June 1962, and the Down Yard in May 1963.

Gorgie East station was re-opened for one day on 21 May 1969 when a contingent of the Household Cavalry arrived by special trains, using the station.

== Proposals for restoring passenger services ==
The Edinburgh South Suburban Railway (including hypothetically reopened stations) with tram interchanges shown

In the 64 years since the closure of the line to passengers, there have been several proposals and campaigns for the restoration of the service. As of 2026, none of these has come to fruition.

Six months after the closure, a survey carried out by the Edinburgh Suburban Travellers Association found that 82% of former passengers considered their journeys were now worse than before, citing higher fares, longer travel times and a lower level of comfort.

In 1973, the Cockburn Association organised an excursion by chartered train, carrying 550 passengers, which ran round the suburban line from Waverley and then on to Livingston. The aim was to promote the possibility of restoring passenger services to the line as well as to other disused lines in the region.

Schemes to restore passenger services were considered by Edinburgh Council in 1984 and by Lothian Regional Transport in 1989, but nothing resulted in either case.

In 1986, Edinburgh Council commissioned a report from the Transport Research Group at Napier College on a possible restoration of services. The report recommended re-opening five of the former stations and creating three new ones; it estimated the service would carry 1.68 million passengers per year. However, no action was taken on the report.

In January 2000, the E-Rail Group was launched with the aim of re-opening the line. This was to be largely financed by property developers who would benefit from building homes and offices along the route. In October 2002, the Scotsman reported that the group had raised £25 million and that the line could be re-opened within three years. It also said that the Scottish Parliament’s Transport and Environment Committee supported the re-opening.

In August 2003, the Capital Rail Action Group published a proposal which they called "Crossrail 2". This suggested that trains could run into Waverley from North Berwick and Dunbar, and then on to Haymarket and round the suburban line, terminating at Newcraighall. The service would thus not form a circle but rather a "terminal loop". The group claimed that this would enable a half-hour service to be run, and that no new infrastructure would be needed.

In May 2008, the Transport, Infrastructure and Environment Committee of Edinburgh Council reported on a study into the feasibility of reopening the line. It concluded that there was insufficient capacity on the line to support a city centre service, and that there would be very limited benefits in a reopening. The priority should be to improve transport links between Edinburgh and the rest of Scotland. The report also rejected a proposed link between the Sub and Edinburgh Park.

Starting in the mid-2010s, there have been proposals for a hybrid tram-train system, using vehicles capable of running on both traditional heavy rail and on city centre streets. In 2016, Phil Verster, the managing director of ScotRail Alliance (which consisted at the time of Abellio ScotRail and Network Rail) said tram-trains could be introduced after electrification of the suburban line. By running on the street in the city centre they would avoid adding to congestion at Waverley. In 2020, Ewan Kennedy. Senior Transport Manager at Edinburgh Council, said that there was no case for restoring passenger services to the city centre. While there was some potential for a southern orbital route, the level of capital investment would be extremely high and was unlikely to be justified commercially.

Edinburgh Council's draft Public Transport Action Plan 2030, published in January 2023, stated that the council would "review previous South Suburban Rail Line studies and changes in policy and demand since these were undertaken."

In January 2026, Edinburgh Council published a map showing a potential tram-train route that would use the Sub between Haymarket and Portobello, but diverging from it to connect with the existing tram route in Leith Walk. The Council stated that "the planned route is indicative, not final" and is "meant to show what a future line might look like in years to come".

In August 2026, Transport Scotland and Network Rail jointly announced a "high-level" feasibility study into proposals for a tram-train service on the line. The study would be funded by the Scottish government.

== Present day ==
As of 2026, the line is almost exclusively used by goods trains, this being an alternative to the busy route between Haymarket and Waverley, where it is difficult to find paths to run goods trains. Nearly all freight trains crossing the city use the Sub, joining or leaving it just north of Newcraighall station. As of May 2018 there was one passenger train per day which was booked to use the line: the 2105 from Glasgow Central to Edinburgh Waverley operated by CrossCountry, which was booked to run on the line for train crew route knowledge retention. This final regular passenger working was withdrawn from 22 May 2023. There are also a few Empty Coaching Stock (ECS) moves that use the line. The line is also used on occasions where the line between Haymarket and Waverley is closed for any engineering work, for example during the closure of Haymarket station in December 2019, when LNER and CrossCountry trains were diverted along the South Suburban line. On rare occasions the route is also used by charter trains hauled by steam or diesel locomotives.

== Topography ==
There was a triangular junction at Haymarket, with Haymarket West Junction facing Falkirk and Haymarket Central Junction facing Waverley. Both spurs climbed on sharp curves to join near Gorgie Road, the climbing at 1 in 80 through a deep cutting. After Craiglockhart station, another cutting was entered; this one required a pumping station to prevent flooding. The cuttings now became shallower as far as the summit near Morningside (Road) station, a hundred feet above the level of Haymarket. Now the line fell at 1 in 85 through a series of curves, then steepening to 1 in 75 as far as Newington. Next there was a long curved embankment past Cameron Toll, and immediately east of Duddingston station the line converged with the St Leonards line of the former Edinburgh and Dalkeith Railway. From there the earlier line continued to Niddrie West Junction, Niddrie North Junction, and Portobello, now facing Waverley.

Locations on the line were:

- Haymarket West Junction (west-facing) and Haymarket Central Junction (east facing);
- Gorgie Junction;
- Gorgie; opened 1 December 1884; renamed Gorgie East May 1952; closed 10 September 1962;
- Craiglockhart; opened 1 June 1887; closed 1 May 1890; reopened 1 January 1891; closed 1 January 1917; reopened 1 February 1919; closed 10 September 1962;
- Morningside; opened 1 December 1884; renamed Morningside Road 1886; closed 10 September 1962;
- Blackford Hill; opened 1 December 1884; closed 1 January 1917; reopened 1 February 1919; closed 10 September 1962;
- Newington; opened 1 December 1884; closed 10 September 1962;
- Duddingston and Craigmillar; opened 1 December 1884; closed 10 September 1962;
- Duddingston Junction; line from St Leonards converged;
- Niddrie West Junction; convergence with NBR spurs to main line and Dalkeith line.

== See also ==
- Transport in Edinburgh
