= Trinity railway station =

Disused railway station in Trinity, Edinburgh

Trinity
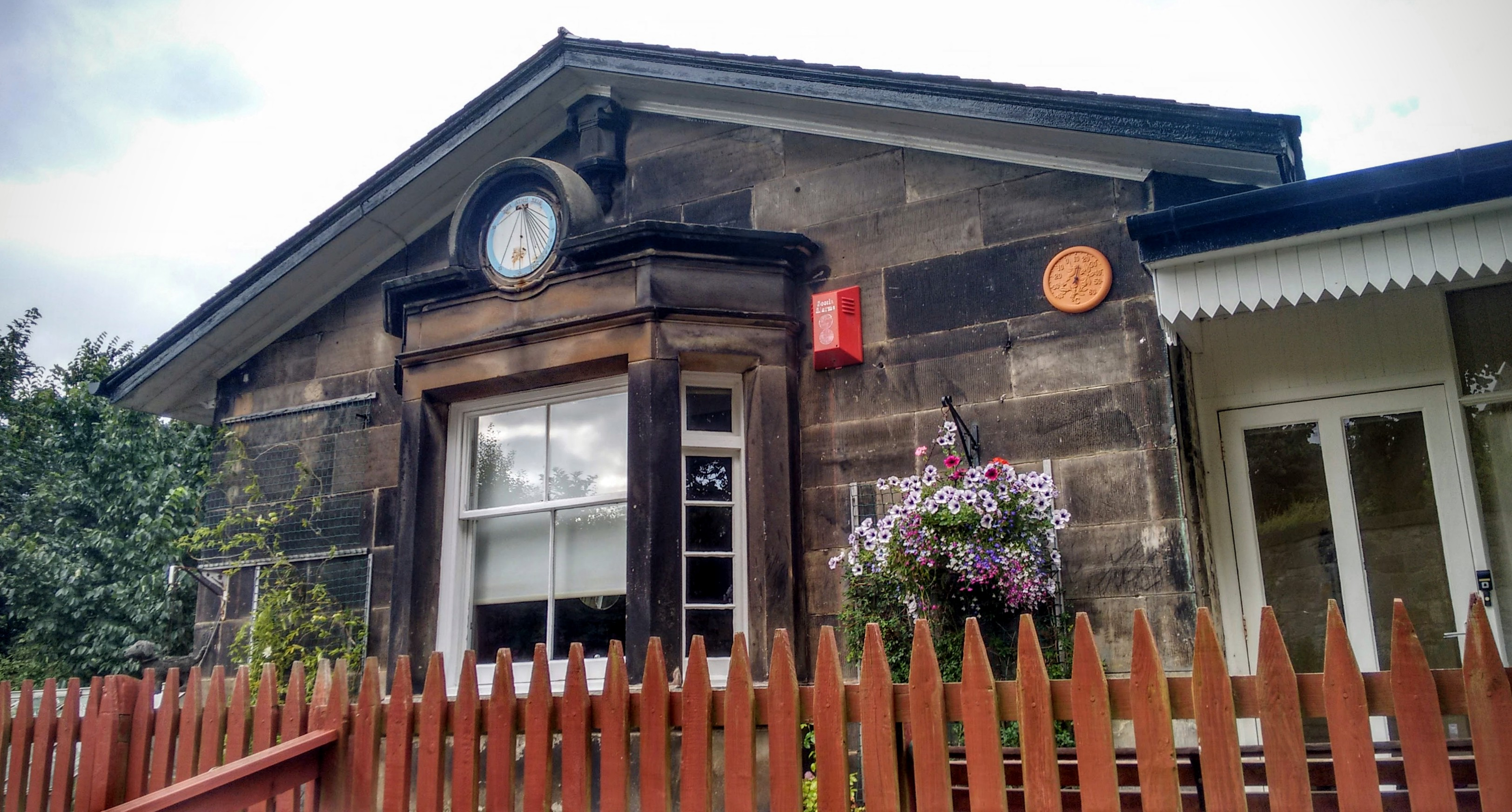
- The station house in 2016

General information
- Location: Trinity, Edinburgh; Scotland
- Coordinates: 55.9791°N 3.2048°W
- Grid reference: NT248769
- Platforms: 2

Other information
- Status: Disused

History
- Original company: Edinburgh, Leith and Newhaven Railway
- Pre-grouping: Edinburgh and Northern Railway; North British Railway
- Post-grouping: LNER

Key dates
- 31 August 1842: Opened
- 19 January 1846: Closed and relocated
- 1 January 1917: Closed again as a wartime economy measure
- 1 February 1919: Reopened
- 2 November 1925: Closed permanently
Location

Trinity railway station served the district of Trinity, Edinburgh, Scotland from 1842 to 1925 on the Edinburgh, Leith and Newhaven Railway.

== History ==
The station opened on 31 August 1842 by the Edinburgh, Leith and Newhaven Railway. The first site of the station closed on 19 January 1846 when the line to Granton was extended. It was relocated and opened in the same year. On the east side was a coal depot that closed, along with the station on 1 January 1917 because of the First World War. The station opened again on 1 February 1919 but the coal depot didn't reopen. The station closed completely on 2 November 1925.

Preceding station	Disused railways	Following station
Granton; Line and station closed	North British Railway; Edinburgh, Leith and Granton Railway	Bonnington; Line and station closed After closure of Scotland Street Tunnel
Terminus Until 1846; Granton; Line and station closed	North British Railway; Edinburgh, Leith and Newhaven Railway	Scotland Street; Line and station closed Before closure of Scotland Street Tunnel
