= Easter Road railway station =

Disused railway station in Scotland

Easter Road
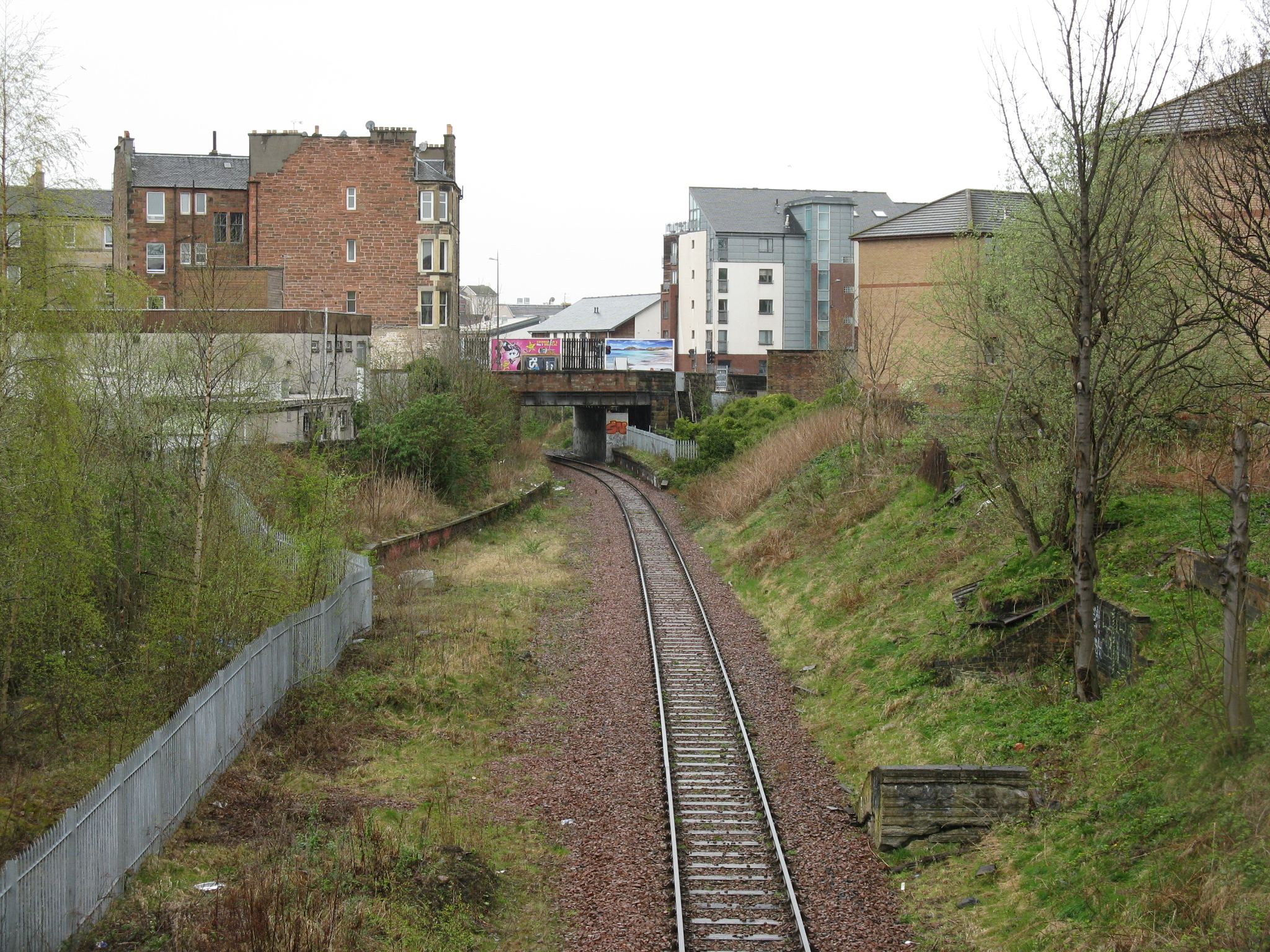
- Site of Easter Road station in 2011

General information
- Location: Easter Road, Edinburgh; Scotland
- Coordinates: 55.961325°N 3.170744°W
- Platforms: 2

Other information
- Status: Disused

History
- Original company: North British Railway
- Pre-grouping: North British Railway
- Post-grouping: London and North Eastern Railway

Key dates
- 1 December 1891: Station opened
- 1 January 1917: Station closed
- 1 February 1919: Station reopened
- 16 June 1947: Station closed
Location

Easter Road railway station was a railway station located on the street of Easter Road in Edinburgh, Scotland from 1891 to 1947 built by the North British Railway.

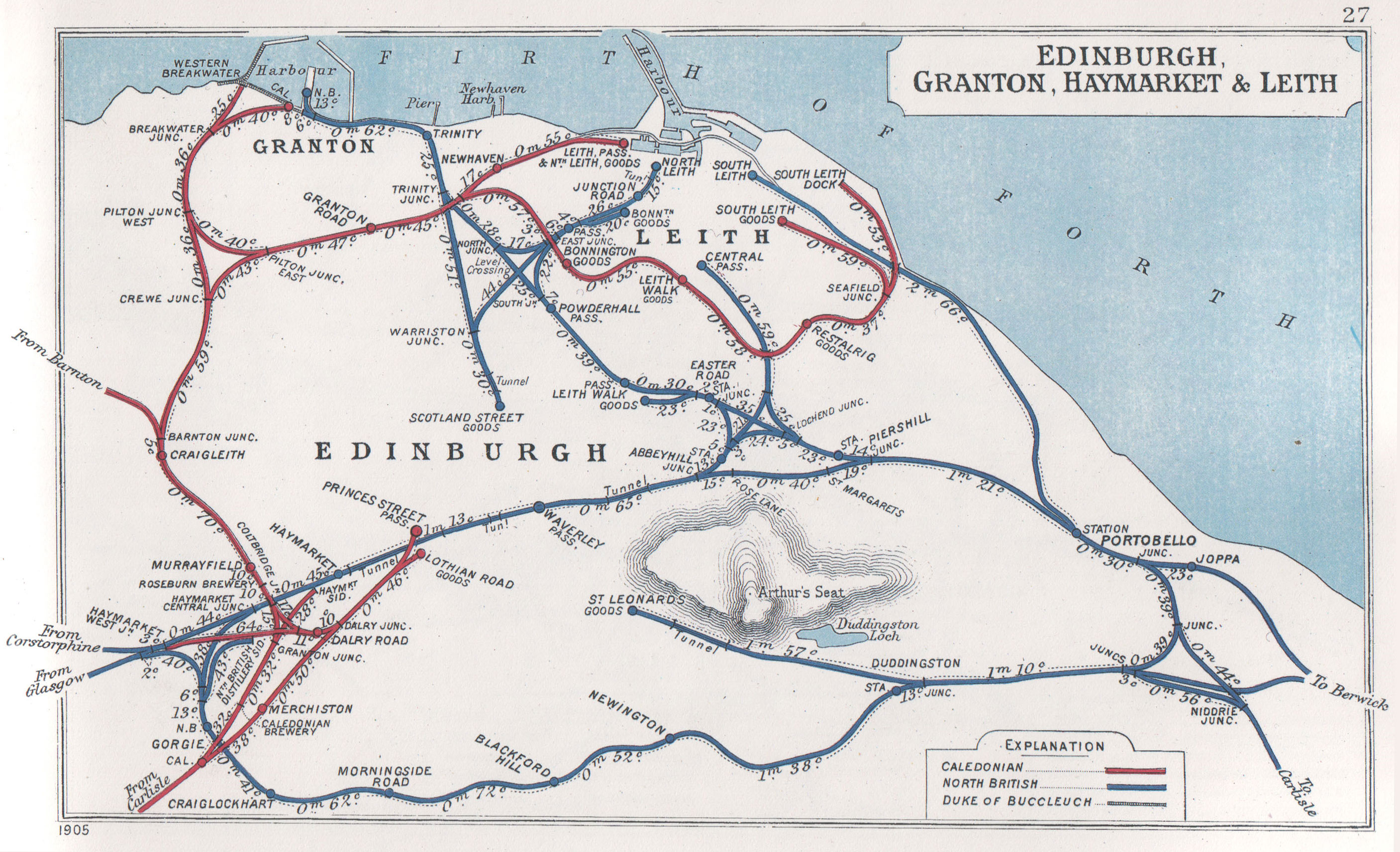
A 1905 Railway Clearing House diagram of Edinburgh railways, showing the location of Easter Road station

== History ==
The station was opened in 1891 by North British Railway as part of the Easter Road Deviation to replace the rope operated incline between Canal Street (later part of Edinburgh Waverley) and Scotland Street, that was originally built by the Edinburgh, Leith and Newhaven Railway. The station closed in 1947. Part of the line from Piershill remained in use to serve the waste consolidation depot at Powderhall which remained in use until it closed in 2016. Both platforms still remain in place.

Preceding station	Disused railways	Following station
Abbeyhill; Line disused, station closed	North British Railway; Edinburgh, Leith and Granton Line	Leith Walk; Line disused, station closed
