= Granton Station =

Granton Station may refer to:

- Granton railway station
- Granton Gasworks railway station
- Granton Road railway station
