= Powderhall railway station =

Disused railway station in Powderhall, Edinburgh

Coordinates: 55.9673°N 3.1884°W

Powderhall
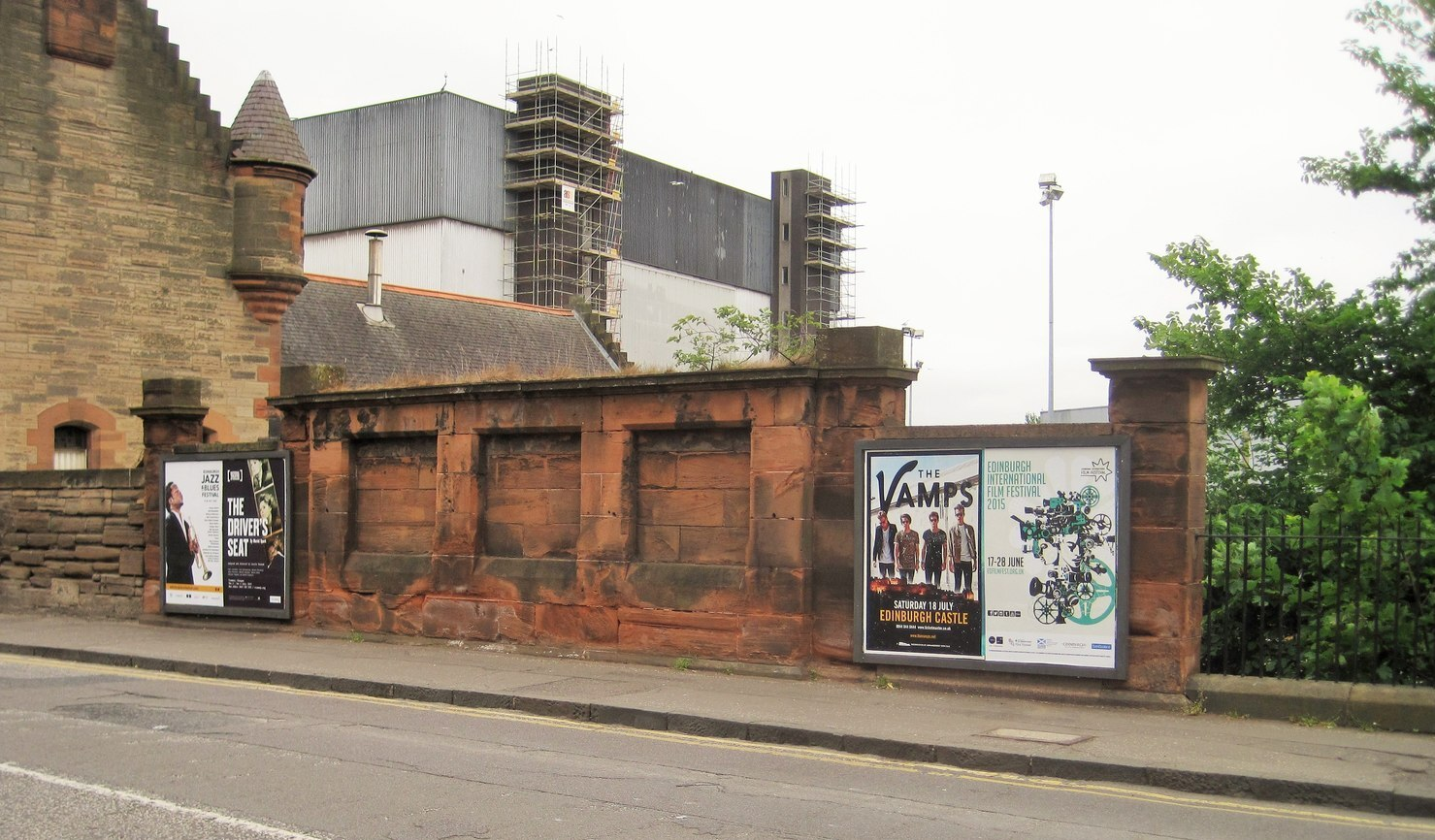
- Remains of the entrance to the platforms below (bricked up and covered with advertising boards) taken in 2015. The gable of Powderhall Stables can be seen to the left.

General information
- Location: Powderhall, Edinburgh; Scotland
- Platforms: 2

Other information
- Status: Disused

History
- Original company: North British Railway
- Pre-grouping: North British Railway

Key dates
- 22 April 1895: Opened
- 1 January 1917: Closed
Location

Powderhall railway station served the area of Powderhall, Edinburgh, Scotland from 1895 to 1917 on the Edinburgh, Leith and Granton Line of the North British Railway.

== History ==
The station opened on 22 April 1895 by the North British Railway. It had a ticket office and waiting rooms on both platforms but it had no goods yard. It closed on 1 January 1917.

Preceding station	Disused railways	Following station
Leith Walk; Line disused, station closed	North British Railway; Edinburgh, Leith and Granton Line	Bonnington; Line and station closed
