= Leith Citadel railway station =

Former railway station in Edinburgh, Scotland

Coordinates: 55.9773°N 3.1759°W

Leith Citadel
- The station building in 2013

General information
- Location: Leith, Edinburgh; Scotland

Other information
- Status: Disused

History
- Original company: Edinburgh, Leith and Granton Railway
- Pre-grouping: North British Railway
- Post-grouping: London and North Eastern Railway

Key dates
- 10 May 1846: Opened as North Leith
- 16 June 1947: Closed to passengers
- 1952: Renamed Leith Citadel
- 1968: Line closed for freight
Location

Leith Citadel, renamed in 1952 from North Leith, was an early railway terminus in Leith, Scotland. It was on Commercial Street, near the Leith Docks.

== History ==
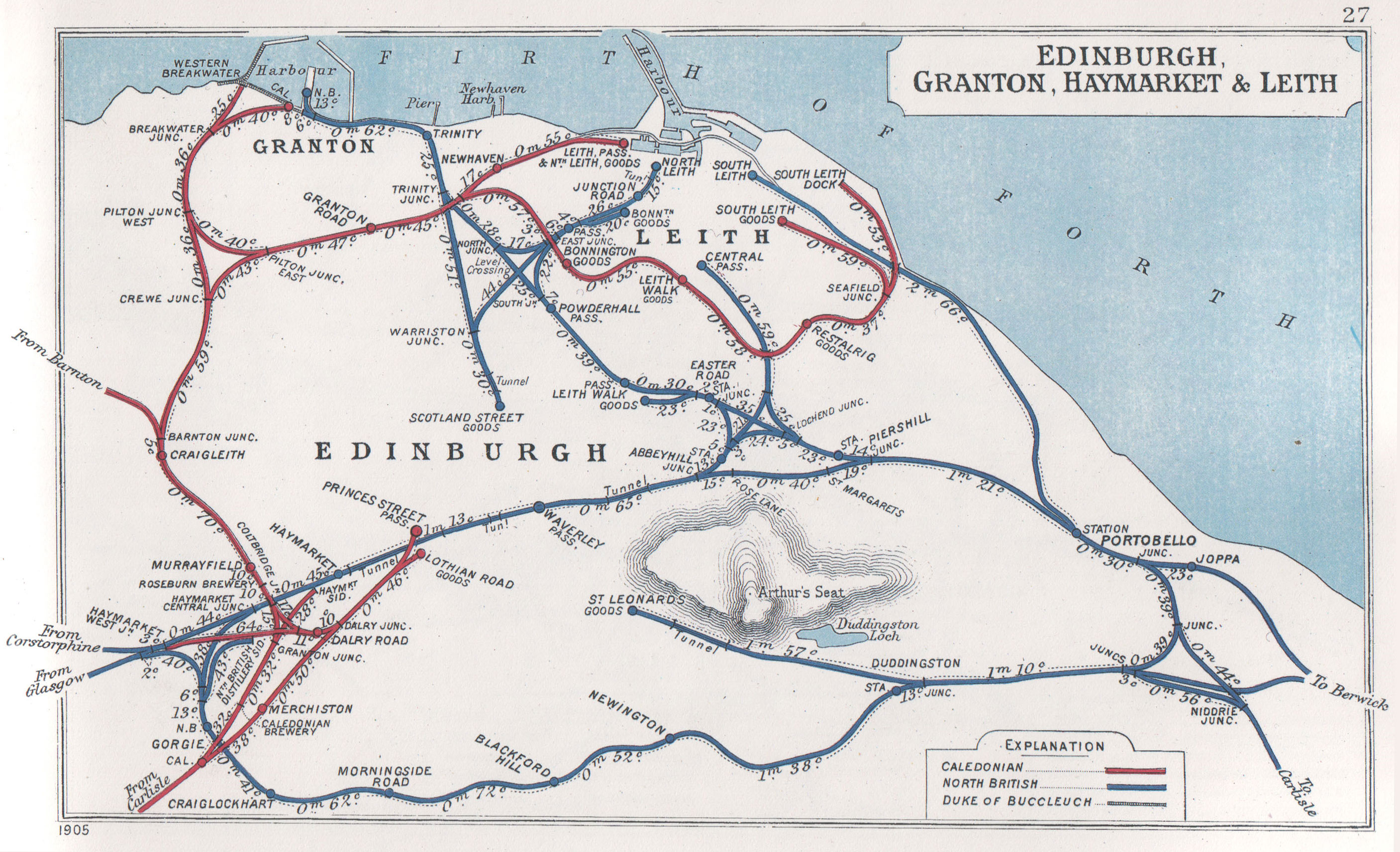
Map showing Edinburgh railways in 1905. Leith Citadel is named North Leith

The Edinburgh, Leith and Granton Railway constructed a branch to North Leith (Leith Citadel) which was opened on 10 May 1846. It served as a terminus in terms of passenger traffic but a freight-only branch on its west side continued into Leith Docks.

It was designed by Grainger & Miller and being one of the earliest railway structures it adopts a Georgian rather than "Victorian railway" style.

It closed (except for the side branch) in 1947. It was converted into a pub called the "Steamboat Inn" around 1950 which closed around 1980 when it was then restored by the Scottish Development Agency as one of the "Leith Project" schemes for community use.

== Today ==
Leith Citadel station is a Category B listed building and is one of the remaining structures from the original line. It is now used as the Citadel Youth Centre.

Preceding station	Disused railways	Following station
Junction Road / Junction Bridge	North British Railway; Edinburgh, Leith and Granton Line	Terminus
