= Junction Road railway station, Edinburgh =

Disused railway station in Leith, Edinburgh

Junction Road
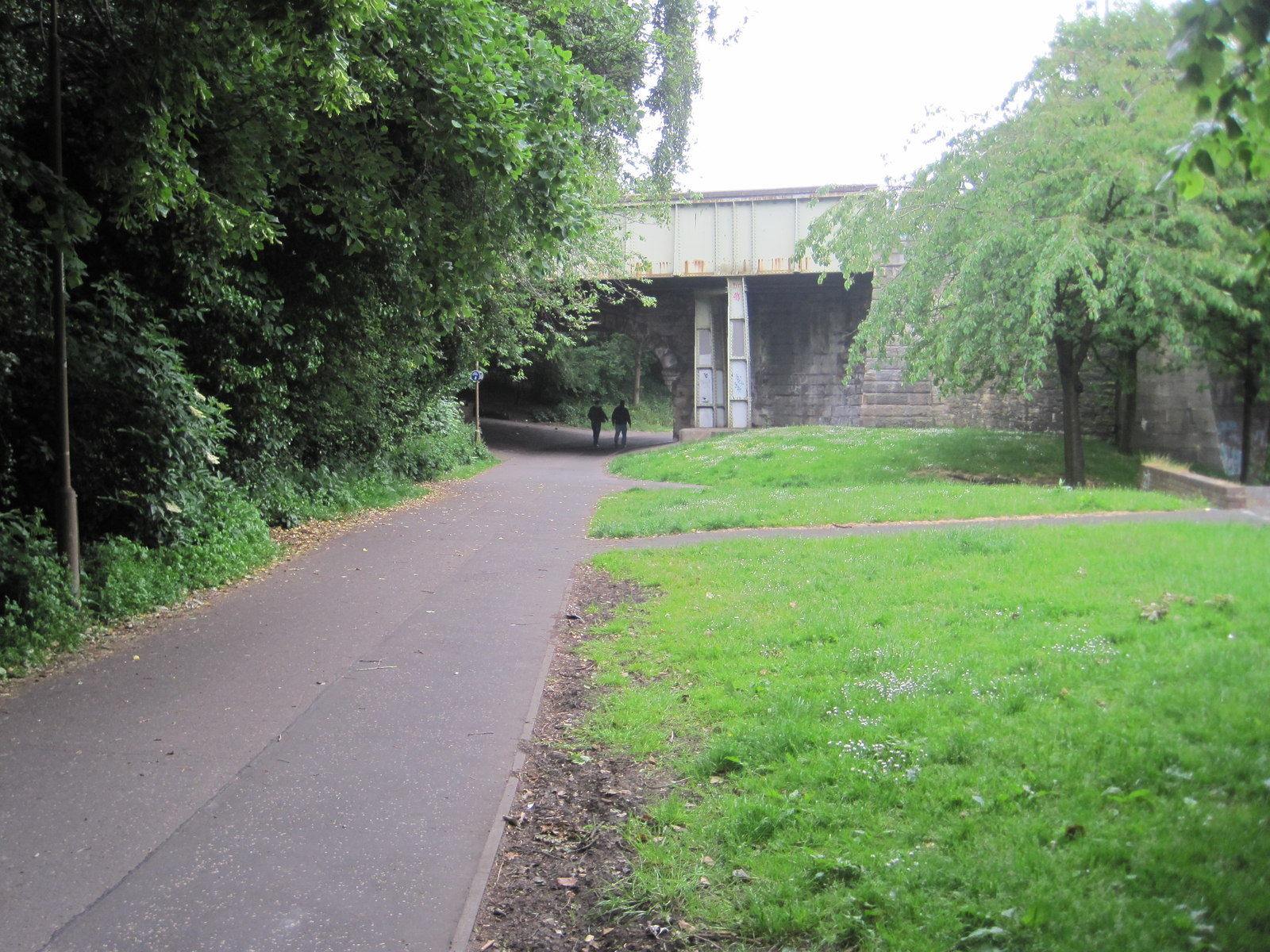
- Site of Junction Road station in 2015

General information
- Location: Leith, Edinburgh; Scotland
- Coordinates: 55.9748°N 3.1795°W
- Grid reference: NT264763
- Platforms: 1

Other information
- Status: Disused

History
- Original company: North British Railway
- Pre-grouping: North British Railway
- Post-grouping: London and North Eastern Railway

Key dates
- 1 May 1869: Opened as Junction Road
- 1 January 1917: Closed
- 1 April 1919: Reopened
- 9 July 1923: Name changed to Junction Bridge
- 16 June 1947: Closed permanently
Location

Junction Road railway station served the district of Leith, Edinburgh, Scotland from 1869 to 1947 on the Edinburgh, Leith and Granton Line of the North British Railway.

== History ==
The station opened as Junction Road on 1 May 1869 by the North British Railway. It had a double track but a second platform couldn't be built due to space constraints. The signal box was to the southwest. A siding to the northeast served a coal depot. The station closed on 1 January 1917 but reopened on 1 April 1919. Renamed in 1923 as Junction Bridge before closing permanently on 16 June 1947. The signal box closed in 1952.

Preceding station	Disused railways	Following station
Bonnington; Line and station closed	North British Railway; Edinburgh, Leith and Granton Line	North Leith; Line and station closed
