= Jane Campbell Overend =

- Born: March 23, 1814; Cupar
- Died: July 26, 1878; Trinity
- Occupation: Writer
- Spouse: George G. Campbell Overend
- Parents: Thomas Horsburgh (father); Janet Makgill (mother)

Jane Campbell Overend (March 23, 1814 – July 26, 1878) was a Scottish writer and translator.

Jane Horsbrugh was born on March 23, 1814 in Cupar, the daughter of Thomas Horsbrugh, Sheriff Clerk of Fife, and Janet Makgill, daughter of George Makgill, 7th Viscount of Oxfuird and Baronet of Makgill/Kemball. In 1869, she married poet, translator, and banker George Gee Campbell Overend.

Overend wrote translations and adaptations of works for children. Her The German Drummer Boy: or, The Horrors of War (1870) is an adaptation of Gustav Nieritz's Der junge Trommelschliger und der gute Sohn (1838), the story of a fourteen-year-old boy, Augustus, who is conscripted into Napoleon's army.

Jane Overend died on July 26, 1878 in Trinity, Edinburgh.

== Bibliography ==
1. The German Drummer Boy: or, The Horrors of War. 1 vol. Edinburgh: William Oliphant and Co., 1870.
2. Stories of the Italian Reformation. 1 vol. Edinburgh: William Oliphant and Co., 1870.
3. The Besieged City, and the Heroes of Sweden. 1 vol. Edinburgh: William Oliphant and Co., 1872.
4. The Slave, the Serf, and the Freeman. 1 vol. Edinburgh: William Oliphant and Co., 1872.
5. The Wanderings of Master Peter in Search of Knowledge. 1 vol. Edinburgh: William Oliphant and Co., 1872.
6. The Noble Printer and His Adopted Daughter: A Tale of the First Printed Bible. Translated, with Additions. Edinburgh: Oliphant, 1873.
7. Fred the Apprentice. Translated and Adapted. Edinburgh: William Oliphant & Co., 1877.
8. The Magic Glass; Or, The Secret of Happiness. Translated, with Additions. Edinburgh: William P. Nimmo & Co., 1883.
