= Leith Walk railway station =

Railway station in Edinburgh, Scotland

Leith Walk
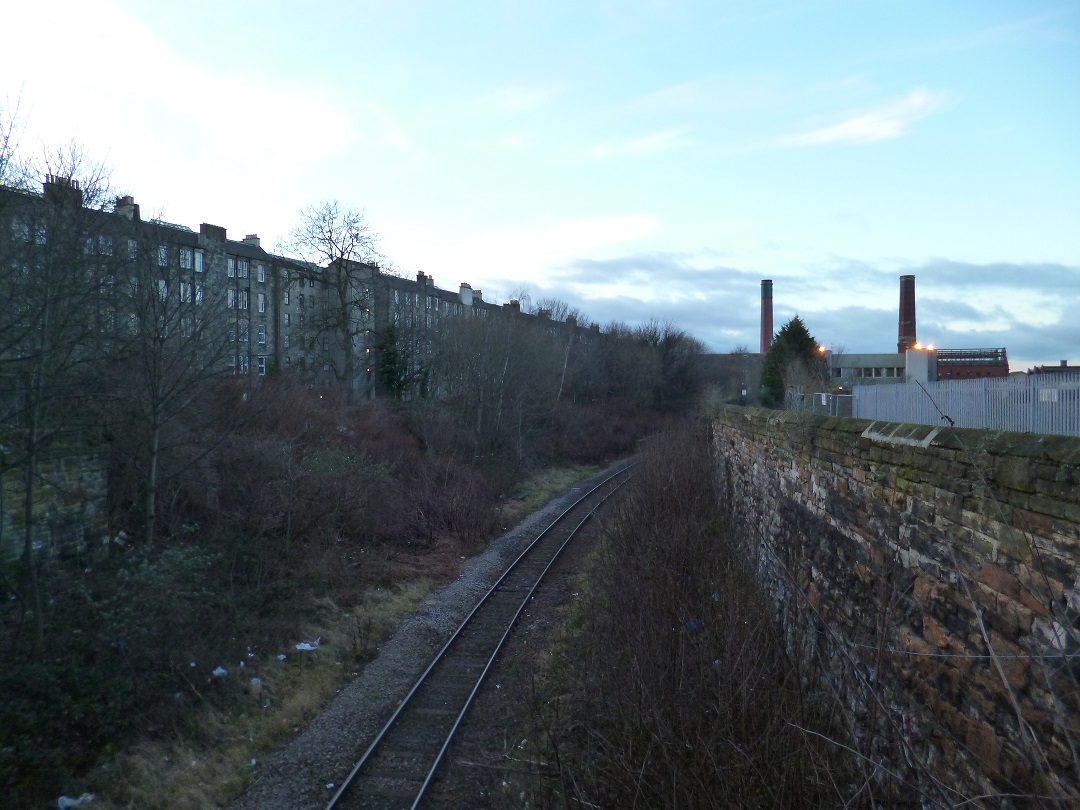
- Site of Leith Walk Station which closed in 1930.

General information
- Location: Leith, City of Edinburgh; Scotland
- Coordinates: 55.9621°N 3.1802°W
- Platforms: 2

Other information
- Status: Disused

History
- Original company: North British Railway
- Pre-grouping: North British Railway
- Post-grouping: London and North Eastern Railway

Key dates
- 22 March 1868: Opened
- 1 January 1917: Closed
- 1 February 1919: Reopened
- 31 March 1930: Closed
Location
- Location within the City of Edinburgh council area

Leith Walk railway station was a railway station located on Leith Walk in Edinburgh. In order to build the station, the Gallow Lee, which was once the site of public executions, was excavated. The station opened on 22 March 1868 and was served by trains on Edinburgh local rail services. During World War I the station was closed as an economy measure between 1 January 1917 and 31 January 1919. The station closed to passengers on 31 March 1930. It is likely that this was due to competition from Edinburgh Corporation Tramways as the tram journey from the city centre to Leith Walk was quicker than travelling by train. Passenger trains continued to serve other stations on the line until 1947.

Parts of the station platforms still exist although they are overgrown with weeds. The station buildings on Leith Walk were demolished in the 1970s. The railway line through the station was used to carry waste from Powderhall Waste Transfer Station to a landfill site in East Lothian until 2016, when the plant closed.

Preceding station	Disused railways	Following station
Easter Road; Line disused, station closed	North British Railway; Edinburgh, Leith and Granton Line	Powderhall; Line disused, station closed
