= Bonnington railway station =

Disused railway station in Bonnington, Edinburgh

Bonnington
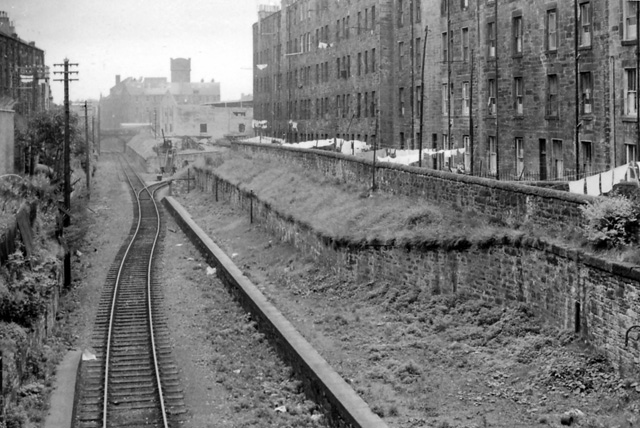
- The site of the station, looking northeast towards North Leith, in 1962

General information
- Location: Bonnington, Edinburgh; Scotland
- Coordinates: 55.9725°N 3.188°W
- Grid reference: NT259761
- Platforms: 2

Other information
- Status: Disused

History
- Original company: Edinburgh, Leith and Granton Railway
- Pre-grouping: North British Railway
- Post-grouping: London and North Eastern Railway

Key dates
- 10 May 1846: Opened
- 1 January 1917: Closed
- 1 April 1919: Reopened
- 16 June 1947: Closed to passengers
- July 1968: Line closed to goods
Location

Bonnington railway station served the district of Bonnington, Edinburgh, Scotland from 1846 to 1968 on the Edinburgh, Leith and Granton Railway.

== History ==
The station opened on 10 May 1846 by the Edinburgh, Leith and Granton Railway. It closed on 1 January 1917 but reopened on 1 April 1919 before permanent closure to passengers on 16 June 1947 and closed to goods in July 1968.

The station building still survives and was converted to a private residence after lying derelict for several decades, and still features some of the graffiti gained during its years of neglect.

In June 2023, the converted station won the BBC Scotland’s Home of the Year

Preceding station	Disused railways	Following station
Powderhall; Line and station closed	North British Railway; Edinburgh, Leith and Granton Railway	Junction Road / Junction Bridge; Line and station closed
