= Granton railway station =

Disused railway station in Granton, Edinburgh

Granton

General information
- Location: Granton, Edinburgh; Scotland
- Coordinates: 55.9825°N 3.2232°W
- Grid reference: NT238776
- Platforms: 1

Other information
- Status: Disused

History
- Original company: Edinburgh, Leith and Granton Railway
- Pre-grouping: Edinburgh and Northern Railway; North British Railway
- Post-grouping: LNER

Key dates
- 19 January 1846: Opened
- 1 January 1917: Closed
- 1 February 1919: Reopened
- 2 November 1925: Closed permanently
Location

Granton railway station served the district of Granton, Edinburgh, Scotland from 1846 to 1925 on the Edinburgh, Leith and Newhaven Railway.

== History ==
The station opened on 19 January 1846 by the Edinburgh, Leith and Granton Railway. The platform had a station building on it and a canopy. To the south of the station was the signal box. The station closed on 1 January 1917 but reopened on 1 February 1919, before closing permanently 2 November 1925.

Preceding station	Disused railways	Following station
Terminus	Edinburgh, Leith and Newhaven Railway	Trinity; Line and station closed
