= Scotland Street railway station =

Former railway station in Scotland

Coordinates: 55°57′39″N 3°11′44″W

Edinburgh Scotland Street
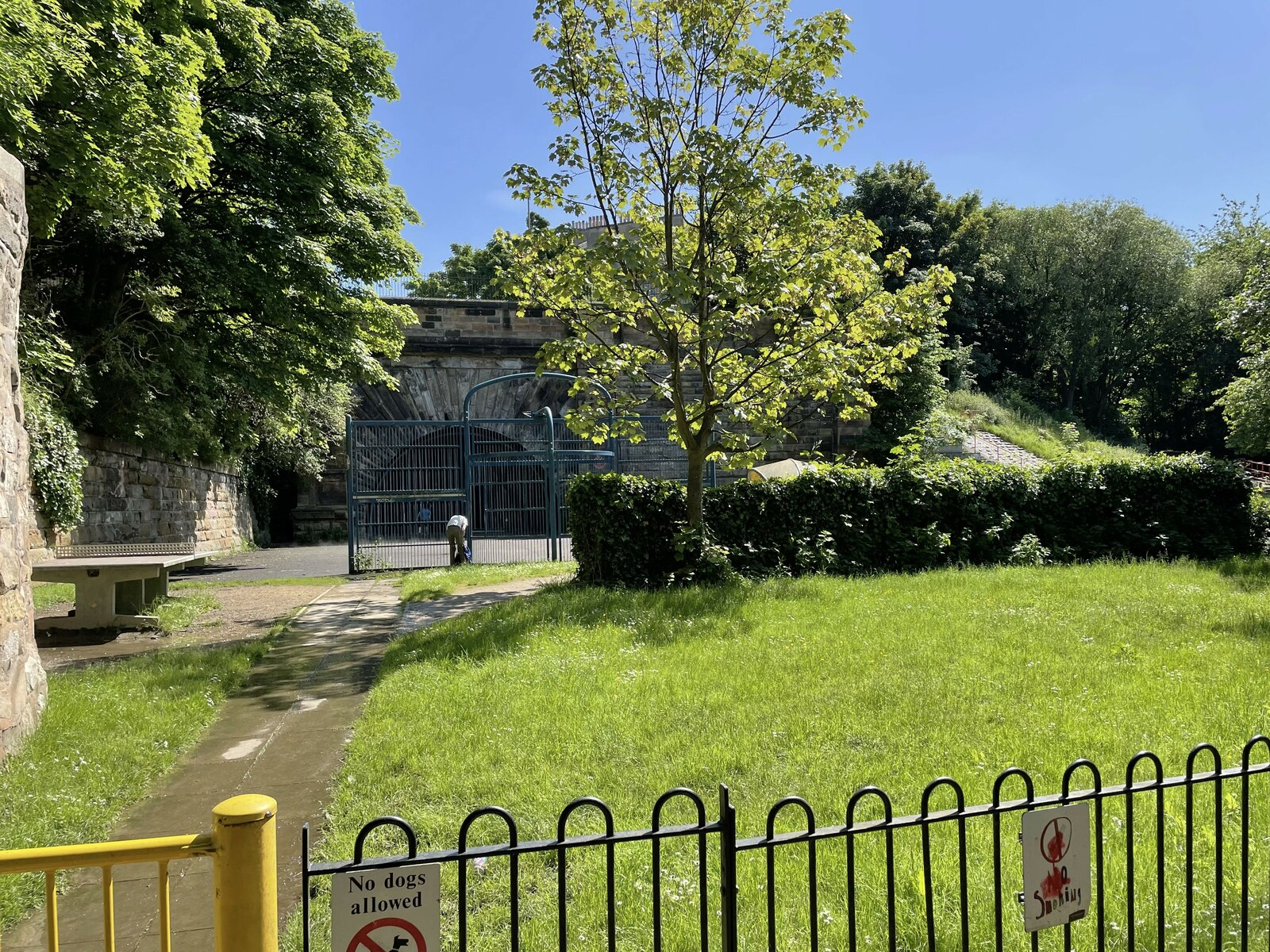
- Site of the former Scotland Street station in 2024

General information
- Location: Edinburgh, Edinburgh; Scotland
- Platforms: 2

Other information
- Status: Disused

History
- Original company: Edinburgh, Leith and Newhaven Railway
- Pre-grouping: North British Railway

Key dates
- 31 August 1842: Opened
- 22 May 1868: Closed
Location

Scotland Street Station was a railway station which stood in a cutting at the north end of Scotland Street, in Edinburgh, Scotland. First opened as Canonmills by the Edinburgh, Leith and Newhaven Railway, Scotland Street stood at the northern end of Scotland Street Tunnel that linked the city centre under the New Town to Canal Street. The trains that used the station were rope hauled by stationary steam engine.

The site of the station is now part of a public park.

Preceding station	Disused railways	Following station
Trinity; Line and station closed	North British Railway; Edinburgh, Leith and Granton Railway	Canal Street; Line and station closed
