= Trinity, Edinburgh =

District of Edinburgh, Scotland

Coordinates: 55°58′38.92″N 3°12′9.01″W

Trinity: Scottish Gaelic: An Trianaid; Scots: Treenity
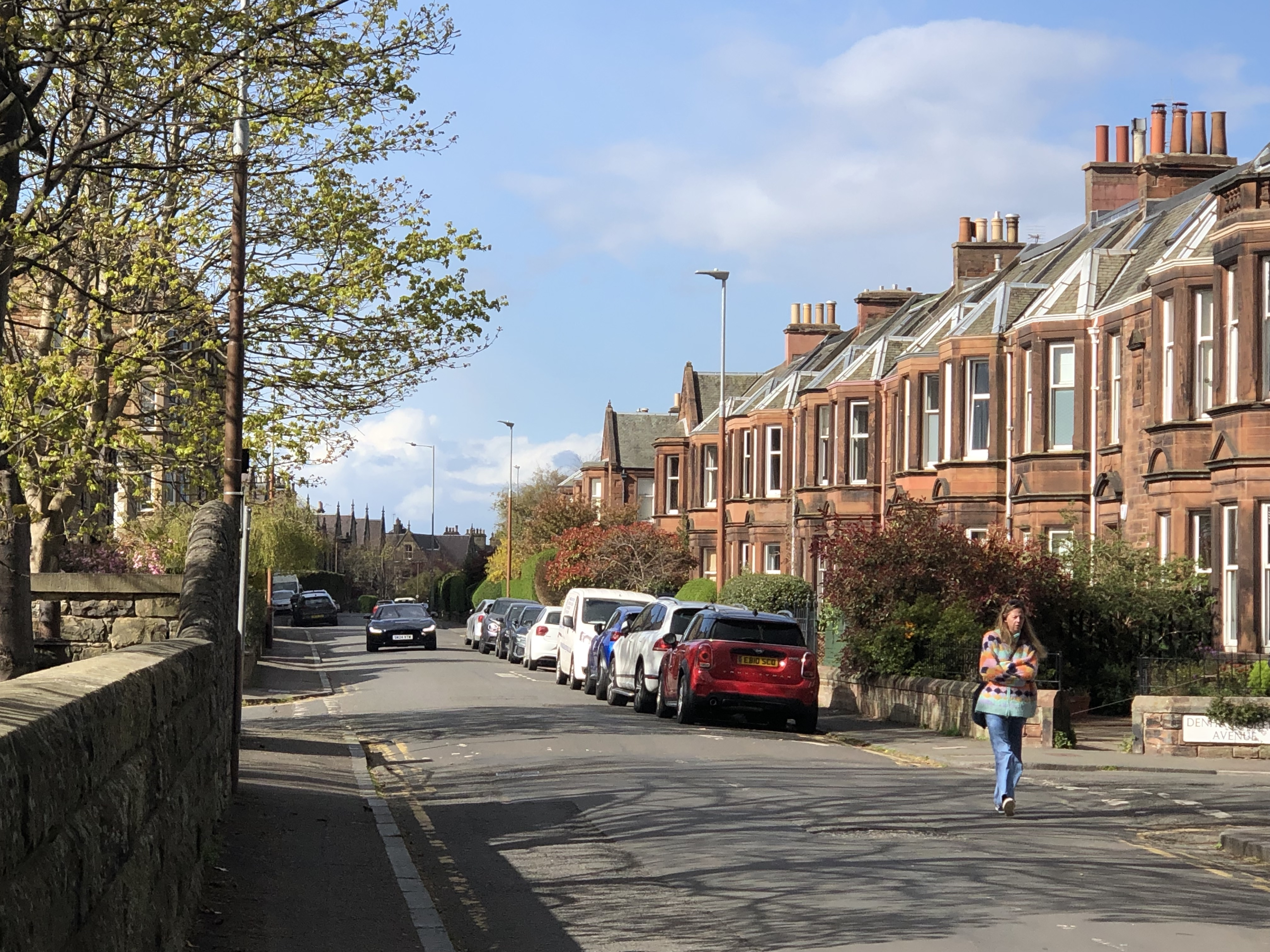
- South Trinity Road

- Location within Scotland
- OS grid reference: NT248765
- Council area: City of Edinburgh Council
- Country: Scotland
- Sovereign state: United Kingdom
- Post town: EDINBURGH
- Postcode district: EH5
- Dialling code: 0131
- Police: Scotland
- Fire: Scottish
- Ambulance: Scottish
- UK Parliament: Edinburgh North and Leith
- Scottish Parliament: Edinburgh Northern and Leith

Trinity is a district in northern Edinburgh, Scotland, formerly part of the burgh of Leith. It is one of Edinburgh's outer villa suburbs, mainly developed in the 19th century. It is bordered by Wardie to the west and north-west, Newhaven to the north-east, Victoria Park and Bangholm to the east and Goldenacre to the south.

== Origin ==
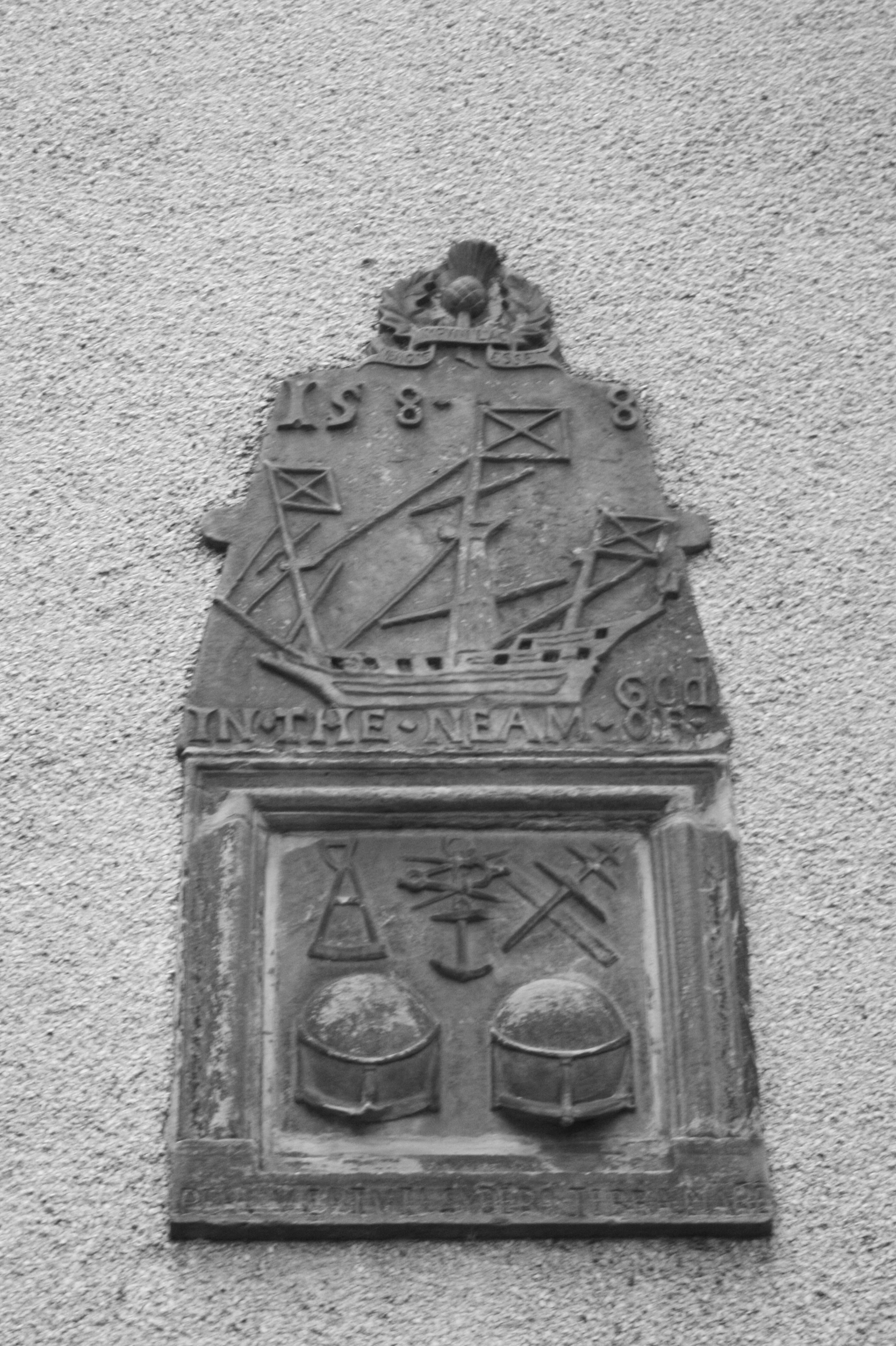
The plaque from Trinity Mains Farm, Newhaven Main Street

The name derives from Trinity House in Leith, which formerly owned the land and had a large estate farm, Trinity Mains, in the area. The farm's coat of arms is preserved on the gable of a building on Newhaven Main Street.

Although some buildings date from the 18th century, the area was largely developed in the early 19th century as a mansion house district, similar in style to The Grange area of Edinburgh. Many buildings served as second homes for wealthy families in the New Town, used as country retreats.

The housing style is now diverse, reflecting the area's continued desirability and consequent development over time. Victoria Park and numerous cycle paths and walkways, built on former railway lines, enhance the area's amenities. East Trinity Road exemplifies this diversity, featuring original mansions, Victorian terraces and tenements, cottages, and modern developments. Craighall Crescent similarly shows a mix of Victorian and later properties.

== Buildings of interest ==
The northeast wing of the 15th-century Wardie Castle (later Wardie House) remains on Wardie House Lane. It was rebuilt in 1780 by Sir Alexander Boswall, whose name is commemorated in Boswall Road.

Numbers 17 to 23 Boswall Road were built in 1815. The westernmost wing (including a telescope viewing area) was Boswall's house; the central and eastern blocks were built as the Pollock Missionary School. The doorway of number 21 appears to be a later addition.

The most notable building on Boswall Road was Wardie Lodge, renamed Challenger Lodge in 1914 by Sir John Murray after his Challenger Expedition. After serving as a children's home, it became St Columba's Hospice in 1977. The original lodge is now largely incorporated into the hospice's modern buildings.

11 Boswall Road, East Cottage, dates from the 17th century and was a summer home for Professor John Wilson, who wrote under the pseudonym "Christopher North".

From 1821 to 1898, the Trinity Chain Pier served ferries and later swimmers. The booking office survives as a pub. Trinity railway station also survives, although converted to residential use.

Wardie Parish Church is one of several Church of Scotland churches in Trinity.

Trinity Academy (originally Craighall Road Public School) was built in 1894. It is one of Edinburgh's older schools, with significant modern extensions.

Trinity Cottage (the home of Christian Salvesen) was demolished in 1969 and replaced by Trinity Park House, a modernist office block used by the National Health Service (NHS). This was demolished in 2008 and replaced by townhouses (Larkfield Gardens). Only the wall and a small lodge remain from the original structure.

Christ Church, Trinity Road, was a Scottish Episcopal church, originally a private chapel, built in 1854, and formerly associated with St James Goldenacre. Some of its artifacts are now housed at St James Goldenacre. It closed in 1980 and is now a private house ("Church House", 118 Trinity Road).

== Notable residents ==
- Allan Ker VC (1883-1958) lived at St Abbs on Russell Place
- James McBain FRSE (1807-1879) Royal Navy surgeon and naturalist, spent his final years in Trinity and died at Logie Villa on York Road
- Dr James Russell FRSE (1754-1836) lived at Bangholm Bower House.
- Bruce Weir, Lord Weir lives in Trinity
- John Wilson FRSE (1877-1959) architect, lived at 20 Lomond Road.

== Gallery ==
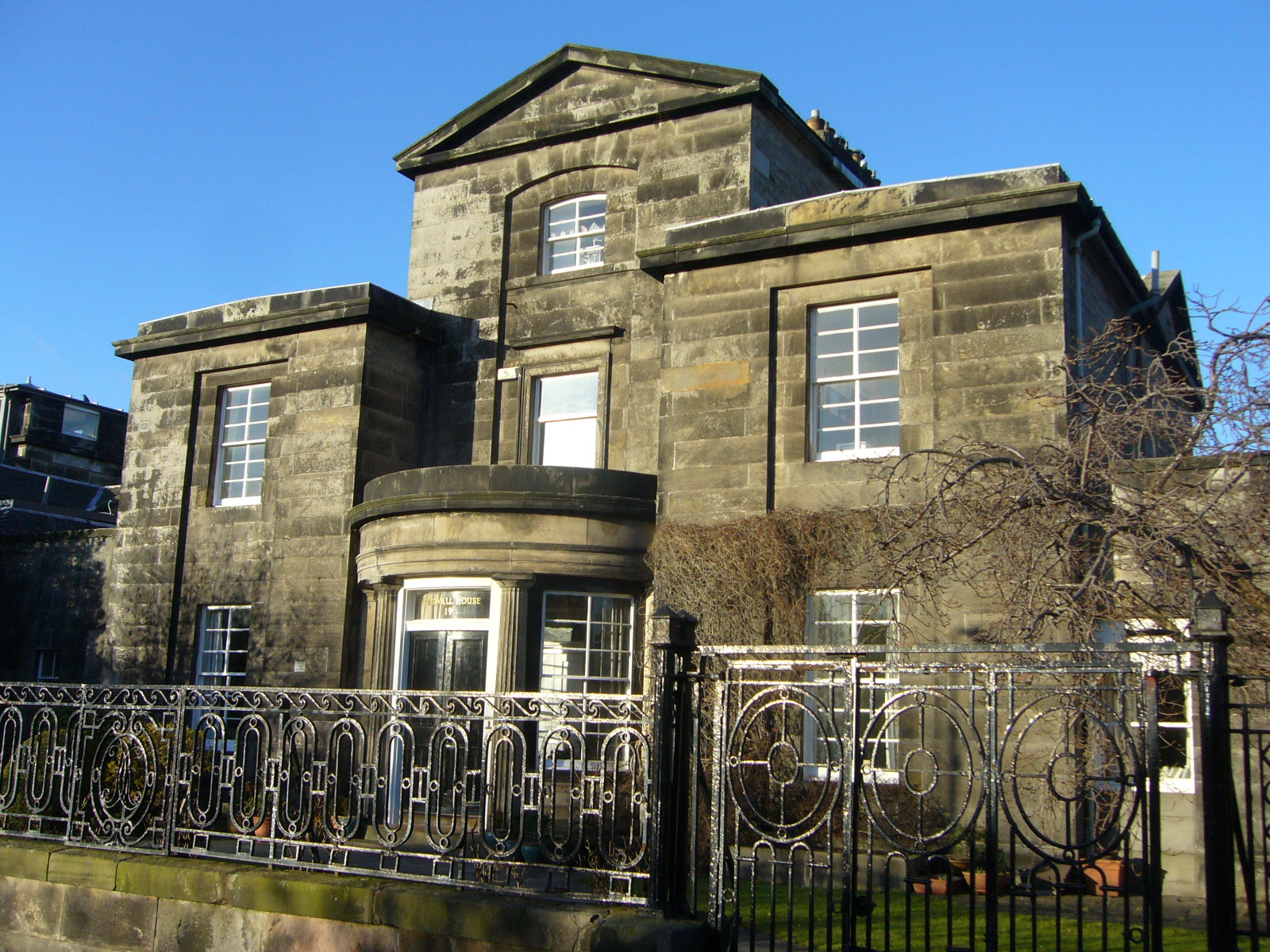
Boswall House built by a Chancellor of the University of Edinburgh

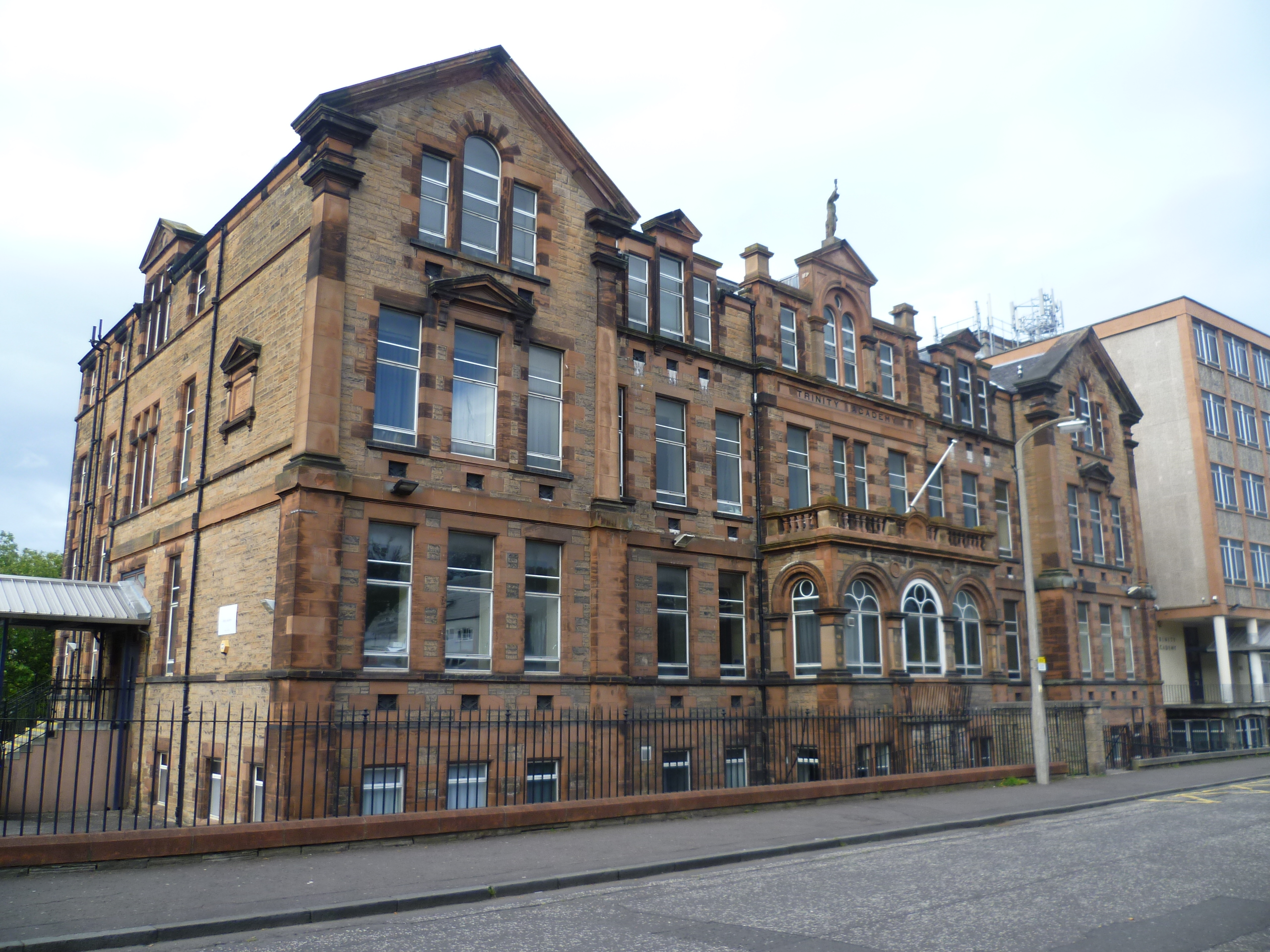
Trinity Academy Old Building

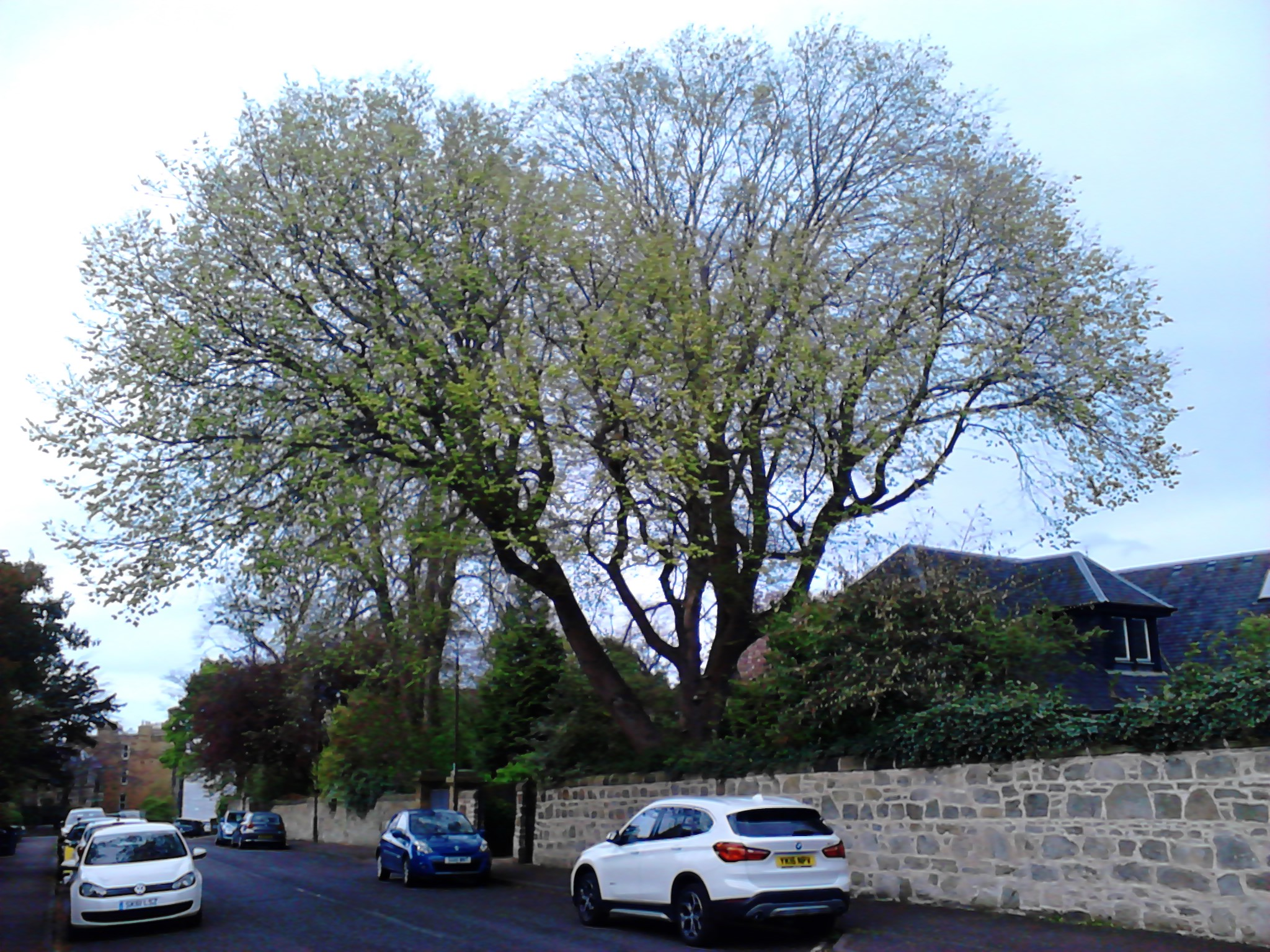
Old hybrid elm, Trinity Road, 2017

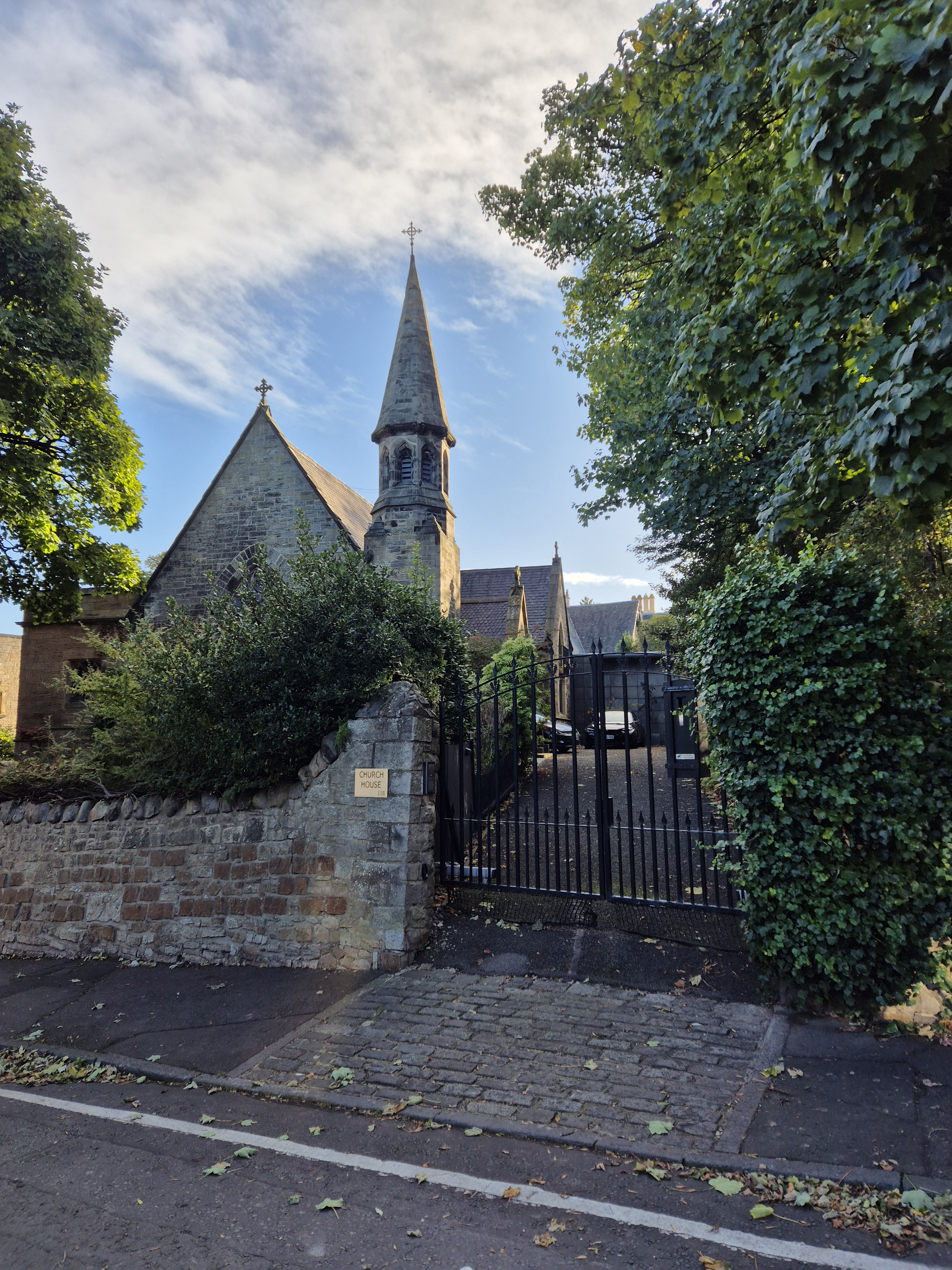
Former Episcopal church, Trinity Road

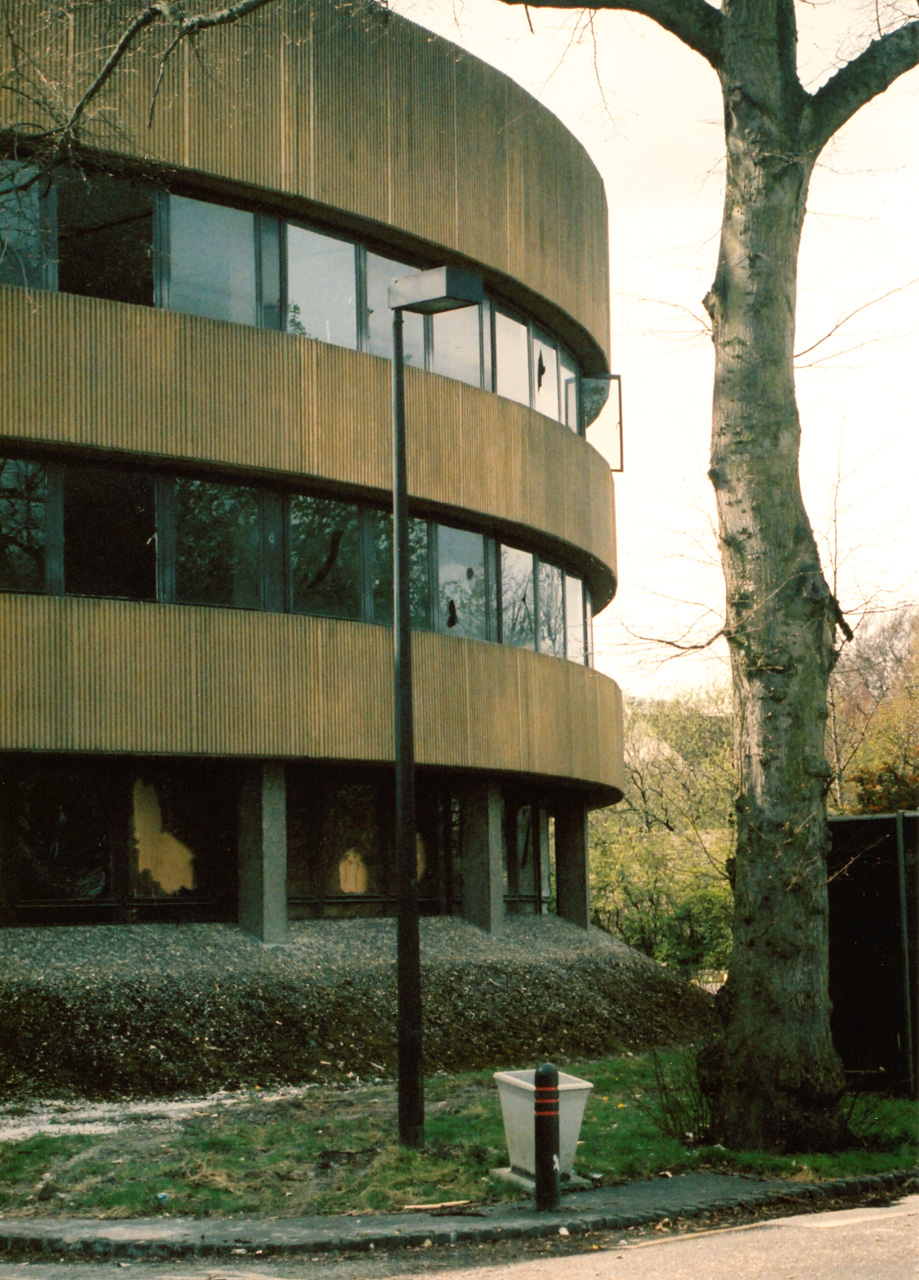
Trinity Park House, now demolished

== See also ==
- The city's Trinity House Maritime Museum, run by Historic Environment Scotland, is located outside the Trinity area and should not be confused with Trinity Park House.

== Works cited ==
- Cole, Gilbert (1988). A Church in Goldenacre. The Rector and Vestry of St James'.
- Wallace, Joyce. Further Traditions of Trinity and Leith. ISBN 0-85976-282-3.
- Biographical Index of Former Fellows of the Royal Society of Edinburgh 1783–2002. The Royal Society of Edinburgh. July 2006. ISBN 0-902-198-84-X.
