= List of listed buildings in Edinburgh/20 =

This is a list of listed buildings in Edinburgh, Scotland.

== List ==
Name	Location	Date Listed	Grid Ref. (Note: Sometimes known as OSGB36, the grid reference (where provided) is based on the British national grid reference system used by the Ordnance Survey. • "Guide to National Grid". Ordnance Survey. • "Get-a-map". Ordnance Survey.)	Geo-coordinates	Notes	LB Number (Note: Historic Environment Scotland assign a unique alphanumeric identifier to each designated site in Scotland, for listed buildings this always begins with "LB", for example "LB12345".)	Image
89 Duke Street, Former Leith Academy Secondary School, Lochend Anexe, With Janitor's House, Play Shelter, Railings And Gateway				55°58′06″N 3°10′00″W	Category B	26754	Upload Photo
Commercial Street And Citadel Street, Citadel Youth Club (Former North Leith Station)				55°58′38″N 3°10′34″W	Category B	26774	Upload Photo
1-13 (Odd Nos) Bernard Street, 30-34 (Even Nos) Constitution Street, Waterloo Buildings				55°58′31″N 3°10′01″W	Category B	26783	Upload Photo
Chapel Street, Former Buccleuch Parish Church				55°56′37″N 3°11′08″W	Category C(S)	26785	Upload Photo
23, 23A Bath Street				55°57′13″N 3°06′44″W	Category C(S)	26793	Upload Photo
Addistoun House With Garden Walls, Archway, Terrace, Walled Garden, Garden House And Wallhead				55°54′37″N 3°21′10″W	Category B	26710	Upload Photo
3 Bath Street Royal Hotel				55°57′10″N 3°06′50″W	Category C(S)	26715	Upload Photo
Addistoun Lodge				55°54′39″N 3°21′09″W	Category C(S)	26723	Upload Photo
Almondhill Farmhouse				55°57′33″N 3°23′46″W	Category C(S)	26736	Upload Photo
22-24 (Even Nos) Bonnington Grove With Boundary Wall; Eh6 4Bl				55°58′22″N 3°11′25″W	Category B	26696	Upload Photo
1 Abercorn Public Park Memorial				55°57′03″N 3°06′22″W	Category C(S)	26698	Upload Photo
Dalmeny Village, K6 Telephone Kiosk				55°58′54″N 3°22′27″W	Category B	6629	Upload Photo
Baberton House, Sundial				55°54′32″N 3°17′43″W	Category B	6130	Upload Photo
Westfield Steading And Cottages				55°58′32″N 3°26′05″W	Category C(S)	5524	Upload Photo
Dalmeny Village, 10 Main Street				55°58′54″N 3°22′25″W	Category C(S)	5539	Upload Photo
Easter Dalmeny Farmhouse				55°59′02″N 3°21′52″W	Category C(S)	5544	Upload Photo
Dalmeny House, Walled Garden With Greenhouses				55°59′13″N 3°20′37″W	Category B	5550	Upload Photo
Dalmeny House, East Craigie Farmhouse, Including Shell House				55°58′20″N 3°18′55″W	Category B	5564	Upload Photo
Dalmeny Village, 20 Main Street, Dalmeny Kirk, St Cuthbert's, Church Of Scotland, Including Churchyard				55°58′58″N 3°22′21″W	Category A	5570	Upload Photo
Dalmeny House, Chapel Gate Lodge				55°59′04″N 3°21′31″W	Category B	5503	Upload Photo
Newgardens, Bee Bole Wall				55°59′14″N 3°22′35″W	Category B	5522	Upload Photo
1 And 3 Crewe Road North, Gec Marconi Avionics Radar Systems Division, Laboratory Block, Including Gateways And Gatehouse				55°58′08″N 3°14′15″W	Category B	45791	Upload Photo
24A Pennywell Road, The Old Kirk Of Edinburgh				55°58′13″N 3°15′00″W	Category C(S)	45798	Upload Photo
17 Broughton Place And 16-18A (Even Nos) Hart Street				55°57′31″N 3°11′19″W	Category B	45925	Upload Photo
103 Broughton Street, Stafford Centre, Including Boundary Walls				55°57′32″N 3°11′24″W	Category C(S)	45933	Upload Photo
22 Claremont Crescent And 91 East Claremont Street				55°57′51″N 3°11′27″W	Category A	45936	Upload Photo
29 Forth Street And 12 Union Street				55°57′28″N 3°11′10″W	Category B	45949	Upload Photo
35-41 (Odd Nos) Barony Street				55°57′28″N 3°11′31″W	Category C(S)	46116	Upload Photo
41 And 43 Cluny Gardens				55°55′31″N 3°12′09″W	Category B	46293	Upload Photo
11, 13 And 15 Lennox Row				55°58′39″N 3°12′28″W	Category C(S)	46737	Upload Photo
Lennox Row, Bridge Over Railway				55°58′41″N 3°12′15″W	Category B	46738	Upload Photo
27 Primrose Bank Road, With Boundary Wall And Gatepiers				55°58′44″N 3°12′38″W	Category C(S)	46740	Upload Photo
8 Russell Place, With Boundary Wall				55°58′36″N 3°12′16″W	Category C(S)	46747	Upload Photo
14 York Road, York Lodge, With Conservatory, Boundary Wall And Gatepiers				55°58′38″N 3°12′10″W	Category C(S)	46760	Upload Photo
22-30 (Even Nos) Glen Street, Former Sisters' House, School And Hall				55°56′36″N 3°12′06″W	Category C(S)	47027	Upload Photo
9-11 (Inclusive Nos) Glengyle Terrace, Including Railings				55°56′28″N 3°12′08″W	Category C(S)	47031	Upload Photo
20 George Square				55°56′37″N 3°11′26″W	Category A	47584	Upload another image
63-65 (Odd Nos) Shandwick Place				55°56′57″N 3°12′35″W	Category C(S)	47730	Upload Photo
3-9 (Odd Nos) Torphichen Place, Police Station				55°56′48″N 3°12′50″W	Category C(S)	47732	Upload Photo
13 East Terrace, Laburnum House				55°59′22″N 3°23′38″W	Category B	47774	Upload Photo
1 And 2 High Street And 3 Bellstane				55°59′27″N 3°23′51″W	Category C(S)	47779	Upload Photo
26-44 (Even Nos) Home Street, 1 And 3 Lochrin Terrace And 2-6 (Even Nos) Lochrin Place Including Cameo Cinema				55°56′35″N 3°12′15″W	Category B	47783	Upload Photo
51-61 (Odd Nos) Forrest Road				55°56′44″N 3°11′30″W	Category C(S)	47866	Upload Photo
23 Spittal Street				55°56′48″N 3°12′10″W	Category C(S)	47899	Upload Photo
Victoria Terrace, With Pavement, Railings Lamps And Steps Leading From Victoria Street To Upper Bow				55°56′55″N 3°11′39″W	Category A	47901	Upload another image
84 -88 (Even Nos) West Bow				55°56′54″N 3°11′40″W	Category C(S)	47904	Upload Photo
Hamilton Place, 45-50 (Inclusive Nos) Patriothall, Former St Cuthbert's Co-Operative Society Stable Yard, Including Gatepiers				55°57′31″N 3°12′25″W	Category B	48104	Upload Photo
Edinburgh Castle, Scottish National War Memorial				55°56′54″N 3°11′59″W	Category A	48229	Upload another image
11 Kinellan Road, St Leonards Including Summerhouse				55°56′55″N 3°15′03″W	Category B	48891	Upload Photo
1-9 And 9A (Odd Nos) Murrayfield Avenue Including Boundary Walls				55°56′48″N 3°14′11″W	Category C(S)	48894	Upload Photo
64 Roseburn Street, Roseburn Primary School, Including Janitor's House, Boundary Walls, Gates, Gatepiers And Railings				55°56′37″N 3°14′12″W	Category B	48911	Upload Photo
61 Northfield Broadway, Royal High Primary School, With Boundary Wall, Railings, Janitor's House And Playshed				55°57′14″N 3°08′25″W	Category B	49042	Upload Photo
North Bridge, South African War Memorial				55°57′06″N 3°11′17″W	Category A	49067	Upload another image
Jeffrey Street, Wall, Vaults, Railings And Pier				55°57′05″N 3°11′07″W	Category C(S)	49085	Upload Photo
17 And 19 Union Street Including Railings And Boundary Wall				55°57′30″N 3°11′10″W	Category B	49154	Upload Photo
4-8 (Even Nos) Nelson Street, Including Railings And Lamp				55°57′25″N 3°11′48″W	Category A	49491	Upload Photo
1 Deanhaugh Street, Pizza Express Building				55°57′30″N 3°12′32″W	Category B	49541	Upload Photo
5 And 6 Bonaly Steading, Bonaly Road With Gate Pier				55°54′07″N 3°15′34″W	Category C(S)	49546	Upload Photo
Dell Road Cemetery, War Memorial				55°54′30″N 3°15′21″W	Category C(S)	49561	Upload Photo
Dreghorn Loan, Laverockdale Bridge				55°54′08″N 3°15′01″W	Category C(S)	49563	Upload Photo
33 And 34 Spylaw Street				55°54′28″N 3°15′28″W	Category C(S)	49569	Upload Photo
3 And 5 Woodhall Road, Fairhaven And Kingcraig, With Boundary Walls				55°54′25″N 3°15′21″W	Category C(S)	49573	Upload Photo
Fettes College, Cricket Pavilion				55°57′55″N 3°13′29″W	Category B	49627	Upload Photo
8 Carlton Terrace Including Railings And Boundary Walls				55°57′23″N 3°10′25″W	Category A	49750	Upload Photo
17 Carlton Terrace Including Railings And Boundary Walls				55°57′24″N 3°10′29″W	Category A	49759	Upload another image
121 Montgomery Street, Calton Centre, Formerly Kirk Memorial Evangelical Union Church Including Boundary Walls And Railings				55°57′32″N 3°10′22″W	Category C(S)	49763	Upload Photo
2 Regent Terrace Including Railings And Boundary Walls				55°57′15″N 3°10′41″W	Category A	49765	Upload another image
8 Regent Terrace Including Railings And Boundary Walls				55°57′16″N 3°10′39″W	Category A	49771	Upload Photo
9 Regent Terrace Including Railings And Boundary Walls				55°57′16″N 3°10′39″W	Category A	49772	Upload Photo
10 Regent Terrace Including Railings And Boundary Walls				55°57′17″N 3°10′38″W	Category A	49773	Upload another image
12 Regent Terrace, Including Railings And Boundary Walls				55°57′17″N 3°10′37″W	Category A	49775	Upload another image
16 Regent Terrace, Including Railings And Boundary Walls				55°57′17″N 3°10′35″W	Category A	49779	Upload another image
21 Regent Terrace Including Railings And Boundary Walls				55°57′18″N 3°10′33″W	Category A	49784	Upload another image
31 Regent Terrace Including Railings And Boundary Walls				55°57′20″N 3°10′29″W	Category A	49796	Upload Photo
3 Royal Terrace Including Railings And Boundary Walls				55°57′24″N 3°10′51″W	Category A	49801	Upload Photo
5 Royal Terrace Including Railings And Boundary Walls				55°57′24″N 3°10′50″W	Category A	49803	Upload Photo
13 Royal Terrace Including Railings And Boundary Walls				55°57′24″N 3°10′45″W	Category A	49810	Upload Photo
16-22 (Inclusive Nos) Royal Terrace, Royal Terrace Hotel, Including Railings And Boundary Walls				55°57′24″N 3°10′43″W	Category A	49813	Upload another image
39 Royal Terrace Including Railings And Boundary Walls				55°57′24″N 3°10′32″W	Category A	49831	Upload Photo
The Pleasance, University Of Edinburgh, Former Quaker Burial Ground				55°56′51″N 3°10′54″W	Category B	50195	Upload Photo
Nether Liberton, 1 Clapper Lane, Clapperfield				55°55′26″N 3°09′51″W	Category B	50794	Upload Photo
15 Montpelier				55°56′14″N 3°12′35″W	Category C(S)	50853	Upload Photo
1, 2 And 3 Upper Bow				55°56′56″N 3°11′39″W	Category C(S)	51068	Upload Photo
Holyroodhouse, Stables				55°57′08″N 3°10′26″W	Category B	51178	Upload another image
Parliament Square, Advocates' Library, Including Wall And Railings				55°56′56″N 3°11′30″W	Category A	51179	Upload Photo
96 Inverleith Place				55°57′54″N 3°13′17″W	Category C(S)	51319	Upload Photo
Craigentinny Road, St Christopher's Church And Hall Including Boundary Walls				55°57′38″N 3°08′07″W	Category C(S)	51657	Upload Photo
16 Glenlockhart Road, Glenwood Including Garage, Boundary Walls, Gatepiers And Gates				55°55′12″N 3°14′12″W	Category B	51774	Upload Photo
402 Ferry Road (Castleview) And 15 Wardie Avenue (Castlehaven), Including Boundary Walls				55°58′15″N 3°12′56″W	Category C(S)	45649	Upload Photo
Drummond Place Gardens, Railings And Gate				55°57′31″N 3°11′43″W	Category B	45478	Upload Photo
Great King Street, K6 Telephone Kiosk				55°57′28″N 3°11′59″W	Category B	45480	Upload Photo
Heriot Row, At India Street, Police Box				55°57′17″N 3°12′19″W	Category B	45484	Upload Photo
Baberton House, Walled Garden				55°54′30″N 3°17′48″W	Category C(S)	45415	Upload Photo
Craigiehall				55°57′52″N 3°20′11″W	Category A	45432	Upload Photo
10 Cramond Bridge, Cramond Bridge Farmhouse				55°57′55″N 3°19′07″W	Category C(S)	45435	Upload Photo
Seafield Street, Eastern General Hospital, Administration Block				55°58′00″N 3°08′51″W	Category B	44949	Upload Photo
Seafield Street, Eastern General Hospital, Matron's House				55°58′03″N 3°08′50″W	Category C(S)	44950	Upload Photo
144 St John's Road And St Ninian's Road, St Ninian's Church Including Boundary Walls, Gatepiers And Gates				55°56′36″N 3°17′06″W	Category C(S)	44758	Upload Photo
235 Corstorphine Road Including Boundary Walls And Outbuildings				55°56′29″N 3°16′21″W	Category B	44762	Upload Photo
Restalrig Road South, St Ninian's Rc School, Including Railings And Boundary Walls				55°57′39″N 3°09′02″W	Category C(S)	44629	Upload Photo
47 Regent Street				55°57′14″N 3°06′38″W	Category C(S)	44583	Upload Photo
Newcraighall, 85, 87 Whitehill Street, Miners Welfare Society				55°56′07″N 3°05′12″W	Category C(S)	44605	Upload Photo
4, 4A And 5 Ventnor Terrace, Including Boundary Walls				55°55′55″N 3°10′15″W	Category C(S)	44436	Upload Photo
18 West Mayfield, Former Manse To Mayfield Salisbury Church, Including Boundary Walls, Gatepier And Pedestrian Gate				55°55′59″N 3°10′36″W	Category B	44439	Upload Photo
2 Burgess Terrace, Including Boundary Walls				55°56′02″N 3°10′03″W	Category C(S)	44205	Upload Photo
19 Craigmillar Park, Including Gatepiers And Boundary Walls				55°55′46″N 3°10′10″W	Category C(S)	44208	Upload Photo
9 Gordon Terrace, Netherbrae, Including Gatepiers, Boundary Walls And Garage				55°55′27″N 3°10′05″W	Category B	44218	Upload Photo
11 Gordon Terrace, South Park, Including Gatepiers And Boundary Walls				55°55′23″N 3°10′05″W	Category B	44220	Upload Photo
Mayfield Road And West Mains Road, University Of Edinburgh, King's Buildings, Joseph Black Chemistry Building				55°55′25″N 3°10′34″W	Category B	44228	Upload Photo
3 Mayfield Terrace, Including Boundary Walls				55°56′07″N 3°10′21″W	Category C(S)	44232	Upload Photo
5 And 7 Mayfield Terrace, Including Boundary Walls And Pedestrian Gates				55°56′06″N 3°10′20″W	Category C(S)	44233	Upload Photo
3 And 3A Queens Crescent, Including Boundary Walls				55°56′02″N 3°10′20″W	Category C(S)	44252	Upload Photo
19B Queens Crescent, Waverley Lodge, Including Boundary Walls And Carriage Gate				55°56′04″N 3°10′05″W	Category C(S)	44253	Upload Photo
16 Queens Crescent, Including Boundary Walls				55°56′03″N 3°10′11″W	Category C(S)	44254	Upload Photo
102 Whitehouse Road, Including Outbuilding And Boundary Wall				55°58′15″N 3°18′28″W	Category C(S)	43942	Upload Photo
79 Lauriston Place, Simpson's Hotel, Including Boundary Wall And Railings				55°56′40″N 3°12′03″W	Category C(S)	44033	Upload Photo
Balgreen Road, The Wheatsheaf Including Gatepiers And Boundary Walls				55°56′03″N 3°14′45″W	Category B	44034	Upload another image
22 Cammo Crescent, Including Gatepiers And Boundary Wall				55°57′39″N 3°18′37″W	Category C(S)	43934	Upload Photo
61 Gamekeeper's Road, Winton Hall, Including Boundary Wall And Gatepiers				55°58′09″N 3°18′24″W	Category C(S)	43938	Upload Photo
3 And 4 Great Michael Close				55°58′50″N 3°11′37″W	Category C(S)	43697	Upload Photo
62 Newhaven Main Street				55°58′50″N 3°11′51″W	Category B	43709	Upload Photo
1-19 (Odd Nos) New Lane, Newhaven				55°58′47″N 3°11′26″W	Category B	43710	Upload Photo
12 Park Road, Newhaven, Including Gatepiers And Boundary Walls				55°58′47″N 3°11′41″W	Category B	43720	Upload Photo
1 Wester Close				55°58′50″N 3°11′42″W	Category C(S)	43727	Upload Photo
7 And 8 Wester Close				55°58′50″N 3°11′43″W	Category C(S)	43730	Upload Photo
6 And 8 Hill Street				55°57′12″N 3°12′07″W	Category A	43299	Upload Photo
18 And 20 Hill Street				55°57′12″N 3°12′09″W	Category A	43303	Upload Photo
24 And 25 Princes Street				55°57′11″N 3°11′28″W	Category B	43315	Upload Photo
74-75 Princes Street				55°57′08″N 3°11′46″W	Category B	43318	Upload Photo
159, 161 And 161A Rose Street				55°57′05″N 3°12′18″W	Category B	43334	Upload another image
178-182 (Even Nos) Rose Street				55°57′05″N 3°12′15″W	Category B	43341	Upload Photo
Thistle Street, 3 And 4 Thistle Court With Lamp Brackets, Boundary Walls, Gates And Railings				55°57′16″N 3°11′46″W	Category A	43351	Upload another image
5-15 (Odd Nos) Thistle Street				55°57′17″N 3°11′46″W	Category C(S)	43354	Upload Photo
27 Thistle Street, Napier House				55°57′15″N 3°11′55″W	Category C(S)	43355	Upload Photo
51-55 (Odd Nos) Thistle Street				55°57′15″N 3°11′59″W	Category B	43360	Upload Photo
37 Young Street Lane North				55°57′12″N 3°12′18″W	Category C(S)	43370	Upload Photo
85 Kirkbrae				55°54′49″N 3°09′36″W	Category C(S)	43245	Upload Photo
Gilmerton, The Drum, Gardeners' Cottages				55°54′29″N 3°07′21″W	Category C(S)	43252	Upload Photo
35 And 35A Marine Drive, Muirhouse Stables				55°58′39″N 3°15′51″W	Category B	43276	Upload Photo
213 And 215 (Odd Nos) Causewayside				55°56′07″N 3°10′45″W	Category B	43147	Upload another image
5-9 (Odd Nos) East Preston Street				55°56′21″N 3°10′41″W	Category C(S)	43152	Upload Photo
11-15 (Odd Nos) East Preston Street				55°56′21″N 3°10′40″W	Category C(S)	43153	Upload Photo
9 Peffermill Road, Prestonfield Primary School				55°55′51″N 3°09′30″W	Category B	43163	Upload Photo
6 And 8 Priestfield Road (Dunedin Guest House)				55°56′07″N 3°10′03″W	Category C(S)	43168	Upload Photo
19 High Street				55°59′25″N 3°23′47″W	Category B	40377	Upload Photo
41 - 51(Inclusive Numbers) High Street, Including Terrace And Railings Above				55°59′23″N 3°23′38″W	Category B	40387	Upload Photo
41 Station Road, Rosshill Including Boundary Walls				55°59′15″N 3°23′02″W	Category B	40401	Upload Photo
12 And 13 West Terrace				55°59′24″N 3°23′47″W	Category B	40406	Upload Photo
14 West Terrace				55°59′24″N 3°23′47″W	Category C(S)	40407	Upload Photo
East Terrace, Forbes Gardens				55°59′22″N 3°23′39″W	Category C(S)	40345	Upload Photo

== Key ==
The scheme for classifying buildings in Scotland is:

- Category A: "buildings of national or international importance, either architectural or historic; or fine, little-altered examples of some particular period, style or building type."
- Category B: "buildings of regional or more than local importance; or major examples of some particular period, style or building type, which may have been altered."
- Category C: "buildings of local importance; lesser examples of any period, style, or building type, as originally constructed or moderately altered; and simple traditional buildings which group well with other listed buildings."

In March 2016 there were 47,288 listed buildings in Scotland. Of these, 8% were Category A, and 50% were Category B, with the remaining 42% being Category C.

== See also ==
- List of listed buildings in Edinburgh
