= Edinburgh, Leith and Newhaven Railway =

Former railway line in Scotland

The Edinburgh, Leith and Newhaven Railway was a railway company formed in 1836 to connect the city of Edinburgh with the harbours on the Firth of Forth. When the line connected to Granton, the company name was changed to the Edinburgh, Leith and Granton Railway. It opened part of its route in 1846, but reaching the centre of Edinburgh involved the difficult construction of a long tunnel; this was opened in 1847. It was on a steep incline and was worked by rope haulage.

The rope-worked tunnel proved a major handicap, and after the company had been taken over by the North British Railway, a longer but more convenient route was built round the eastern edge of the city at Abbeyhill. It opened in 1868.

By the end of the nineteenth century the Leith station was unsuitable for the developing suburban passenger traffic, and a new branch to Leith Central station was built, opening in 1903.

All of the original route has been dismantled, except part of the line from Piershill to a waste consolidation depot at Powderhall which remained in use until it closed in 2016.

== History ==
=== Before railways ===
The coast of the Firth of Forth runs west to east broadly 2 1/2 miles north of the centre of Edinburgh. As the capital of Scotland, Edinburgh was of supreme commercial importance, and the port of Leith became Scotland's principal port. Its first harbour was constructed immediately after 1710. The harbour facilities were much extended between 1800 and 1817. Newhaven, to the west of Leith, also served as a ferry port; its modest harbour facilities were improved after 1792 by the building of a jetty, and in 1825 a basin was formed by the construction of an L-shaped pier. (Note: The basin is immediately west of the former Newhaven Heritage Museum.) Other small coastal communities on the Forth engaged in fishing and other maritime activities.

Communication with the parts of Scotland further north, and also to the north east coast of England was secured by coastal shipping, and crossings to the southern coast of Fife, easily visible from Leith, were made by large and small boats, connecting with stage coaches.

=== A railway to the harbours ===
Edinburgh, Leith and Granton Railway Act 1836
- Act of Parliament
- Parliament of the United Kingdom
- Long title: An Act for making and maintaining a Railway or Railways from the City of Edinburgh to Leith, and to the Shore of the Frith of Forth at or near to Newhaven and Trinity, all in the County of Edinburgh.
- Citation: 6 & 7 Will. 4. c. cxxxi

Dates
- Royal assent: 13 August 1836

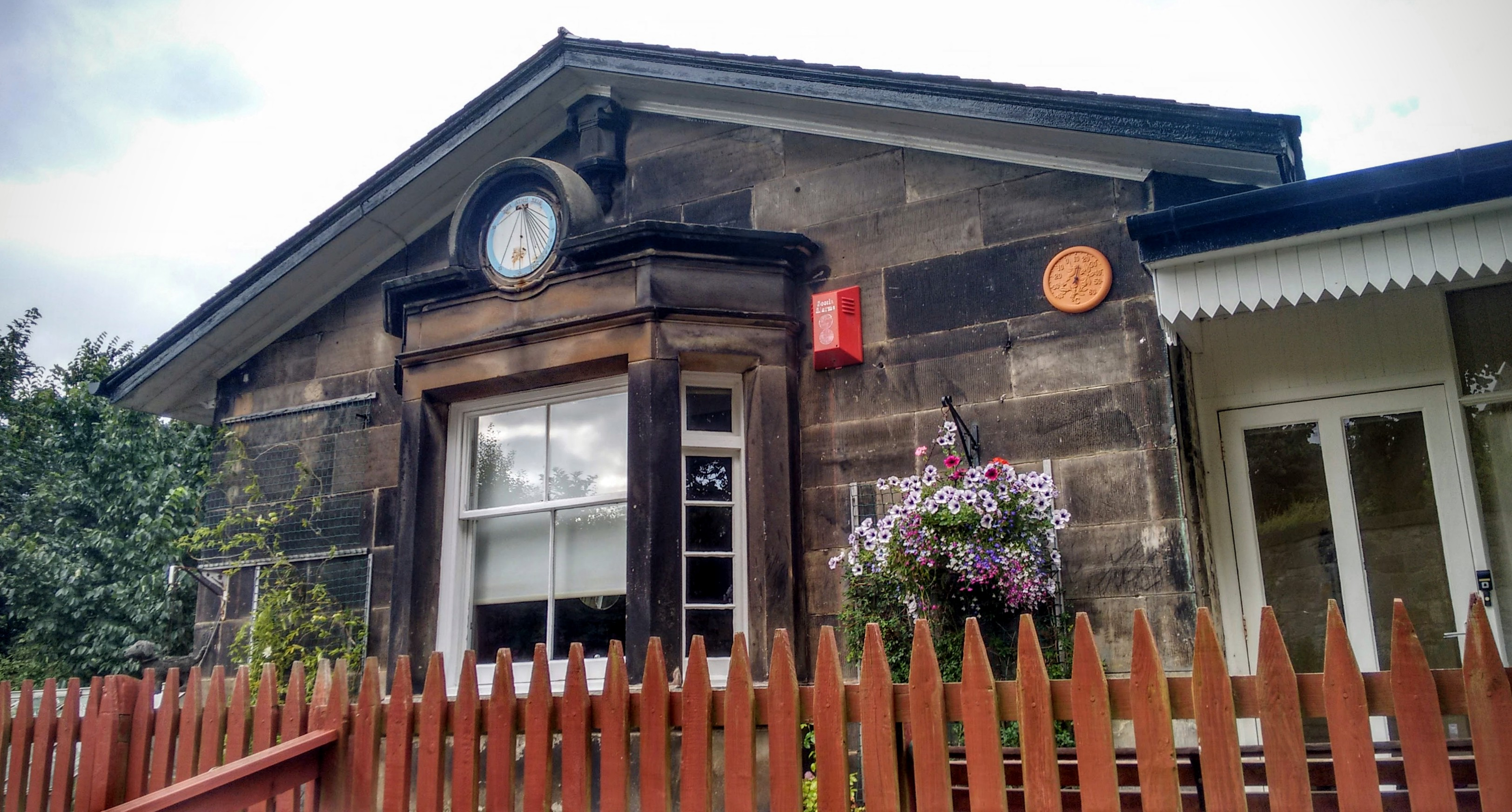
Former station at Trinity, now a private house.

The sea passage was generally straightforward, although slow and sometimes subject to interruption by bad weather. Getting to the harbour, whether for people or goods, was problematic for such a relatively short distance, and the success of the "coal railways", the Monkland and Kirkintilloch Railway of 1826 and its successors, caused business interests in Edinburgh to meet in 1835 to consider a railway connection from the city to the Forth. This resulted in a parliamentary bill in the 1836 session, and the Edinburgh, Leith and Newhaven Railway obtained its authorising act of Parliament, the Edinburgh, Leith and Granton Railway Act 1836 (6 & 7 Will. 4. c. cxxxi), on 13 August 1836.

The main line was to run from Princes Street Gardens to Newhaven, with a branch to Leith. Starting the line at Princes Street Gardens required a substantial tunnel on a north–south alignment under the New Town. The construction was to cost £100,000 but handsome dividends of 15% were said to be assured.

As soon as authorisation was obtained, serious doubts were cast on the commercial viability of the scheme, and the landowners under whose property the line would run in tunnel proved troublesome. Serious technical difficulties with the Leith branch were exposed.

Edinburgh, Leith and Newhaven Railway Act 1839
- Act of Parliament
- Parliament of the United Kingdom
- Long title: An Act to alter, amend, and enlarge the Powers and Provisions of an Act passed in the Seventh Year of the Reign of His Majesty King William the Fourth, intituled "An Act for making and maintaining a Railway or Railways from the City of Edinburgh to Leith, and to the Shore of the Frith of Forth at or near to Newhaven and Trinity, all in the County of Edinburgh;" and to alter and vary the Lines and Levels of the Railways thereby authorized to be made; and for other Purposes relating to the said Undertaking.
- Citation: 2 & 3 Vict. c. li

Dates
- Royal assent: 1 July 1839

Other legislation
- Amends: Edinburgh, Leith and Granton Railway Act 1836

Text of statute as originally enacted

This caused considerable delay, during which a new harbour was proposed at Trinity, to the west of Newhaven, and the parties interested in that harbour had taken control of the railway company. The location of the proposed northern terminal was changed, to Trinity: a further act of Parliament, the Edinburgh, Leith and Newhaven Railway Act 1839 (2 & 3 Vict. c. li) of 1 July 1839 authorised the variation of the route. The southern end, to Canal Street (by Princes Gardens) and the tunnel were unchanged. Trinity Harbour was never built: the northern terminal was set back from the shoreline and at a high level, but was near Trinity Chain Pier. This had been in use as a ferry pier since 1821 and was apparently preferred for the railway passengers, who made their way on foot from the railway station to the ferry.

On 31 August 1842 the line opened from Trinity to Scotland Street, in the Canonmills district some way from the intended Princes Street terminus: the tunnel to Canal Street was not yet complete, and the Leith branch not started. Horse traction was used, and competition from horse omnibuses, which reached more convenient locations in the city, was serious.

=== Granton Harbour ===
The change of mind about the ferry terminal was not the end of the matter. In October 1837 the Duke of Buccleuch started construction work on the Central Pier at Granton, still further west. (Note: Smith and Anderson, page 20; the Ports and Harbours of the UK website says 1836.)

Edinburgh, Leith and Granton Railway Act 1844
- Act of Parliament
- Parliament of the United Kingdom
- Long title: An Act to alter, explain, revive, and continue the Powers and Provisions of the Acts relating to the Edinburgh, Leith, and Newhaven Railway, and to make Two Branch Railways therefrom.
- Citation: 7 & 8 Vict. c. lxxxi

Dates
- Royal assent: 19 July 1844

Text of statute as originally enacted

Buccleuch instituted a ferry service from Granton to Burntisland in September 1844, and the success of this route eclipsed the service from Newhaven and Trinity across the Forth. This took away most of the traffic of the Edinburgh, Leith and Newhaven Railway, which did not come close to Granton. Seeing this difficulty approaching, the EL&HR submitted a bill to Parliament for an extension of their line to Granton, and on 19 July 1844 the Edinburgh, Leith and Granton Railway Act 1844 (7 & 8 Vict. c. lxxxi) received royal assent. The company's name was changed to the Edinburgh, Leith and Granton Railway, and as well as the Granton extension a branch from Warriston to Leith was authorised. The Granton extension was opened on 19 February 1846. A new and attractive station at Trinity was part of the scheme; the line ran west from there, turning north on to the pier at Granton. The line from Warriston to Leith opened on 10 May 1846.

At Granton, the world's first train ferry took goods wagons by boat to Burntisland in Fife. The service commenced on 3 February 1850. Thomas Bouch designed the ferry slip. The ferry was the Leviathan, and was designed by Thomas Grainger. The through train ferry service was withdrawn in 1876, but a passenger ferry continued for many years.

Leith North station building; it is now a youth centre

Bouch's ferry design with its adjustable ramp.

=== Canal Street ===
55.9524°N 3.1898°W
The southward completion as far as the Princes Street terminal took place on 17 May 1847. It was named Canal Street station from the nearby street which took its name from an ornamental canal that was proposed to be formed from the Nor Loch, but never built. The tunnel from Scotland Street was 1,052 yards (962 m) in length, descending at 1 in 27; it was gas lit throughout, and operated by a stationary steam engine and endless cable. It was also designed by Grainger, and its construction was supervised by George Buchanan. The work was difficult due to shifting sand under the New Town, and the demands of property owners who were concerned for the stability of their buildings. The tunnel is just below street level at Scotland Street, but is 49 feet (15 m) below St Andrew Street and 37 feet (11 m) below Princes Street. Locomotive haulage had replaced the horses on the open air sections of the railway, but were retained for shunting at Princes Street. The station there was very cramped, with two impossibly short platforms. The station was aligned north to south, and by now the Edinburgh and Glasgow Railway had extended to North Bridge station, later Waverley, (Note: Ross says that the North British Railway referred to the station as North Bridge at this time. That station was joint from this date with the Edinburgh and Glasgow Railway.) which was adjacent but on a west to east alignment. There was a sharply curved west-facing connecting spur between the two lines.

The train service consisted of 25 trains daily to Granton with through coaches to Leith. Two years later this was modified to give Leith a fifteen-minute interval service, with hourly workings to Granton. Sea bathing was a fashionable pastime and a special bathers' train left at 6:45 am to the shore.

Robert Louis Stevenson, reminiscing about a boyhood visit to Edinburgh, wrote that "The tunnel to the Scotland Street Station, the sight of the two guards upon the brake, the thought of its length and the many ponderous edifices and open thoroughfares above, were certainly things of paramount impressiveness to a young mind."

Canal Street was closed on 22 May 1868 and replaced with the General station at Edinburgh, which later became Edinburgh Waverley.

=== Absorbed by the Edinburgh and Northern Railway ===
Edinburgh, Leith and Granton Railway (Leith Extension) Act 1847
- Act of Parliament
- Parliament of the United Kingdom
- Long title: An Act to enable the Edinburgh, Leith, and Granton Railway Company to make a Branch Railway to the Upper Drawbridge in the Town of Leith.
- Citation: 10 & 11 Vict. c. cli

Dates
- Royal assent: 9 July 1847

Text of statute as originally enacted

Edinburgh, Leith and Granton Railway (Leith and Granton Junction) Act 1847
- Act of Parliament
- Parliament of the United Kingdom
- Long title: An Act to enable the Edinburgh, Leith, and Granton Railway Company to make a Branch Railway from Bonnington to Trinity Villa; to acquire certain Pieces of Land; and to shut up and use certain Roads or Streets for the Purposes of the said Railway.
- Citation: 10 & 11 Vict. c. clii

Dates
- Royal assent: 9 July 1847

Text of statute as originally enacted

Edinburgh and Northern Railway Company and Edinburgh, Leith and Granton Railway Company Amalgamation Act 1847
- Act of Parliament
- Parliament of the United Kingdom
- Long title: An Act to incorporate the Edinburgh, Leith, and Granton Railway Company with the Edinburgh and Northern Railway Company.
- Citation: 10 & 11 Vict. c. ccxxxix

Dates
- Royal assent: 22 July 1847

Text of statute as originally enacted

The Edinburgh and Glasgow Railway, conscious of its own importance as an inter-city railway, had made approaches to take over the Edinburgh Leith and Granton Railway in 1845, but this had come to nothing. The EL&GR had run out of money during the construction work and needed a wealthy sponsor, so the Edinburgh and Northern Railway Company and Edinburgh, Leith and Granton Railway Company Amalgamation Act 1847 (10 & 11 Vict. c. ccxxxix) was passed on 22 July 1847, allowing the EL&&GR to be taken over with effect from 7 August 1847 by the Edinburgh and Northern Railway, (Note: Ross says that the act authorising the acquisition was dated 27 July 1847, but that it was not permitted to be given effect until the following year when 50% of the E&NR had been subscribed. Carter incorrectly gives the date of the act as 2 July 1847.) which was in the process of building its line to Perth and the southern shore of the Firth of Tay. As the E&NR was completing its main lines, it changed its name to the Edinburgh, Perth and Dundee Railway on 1 April 1849. The passenger journey from Edinburgh to Dundee therefore started at what is now Edinburgh Waverley station; coaches were hauled up the steep incline in tunnel to Scotland Street, and then on to Granton by steam engine. At Granton, the passengers changed to a ferry boat which took them to Burntisland, then a terminus. Their train left in an eastward direction and ran across Fife to Ferryport-on-Craig, later renamed Tayport, where they changed to a second ferry boat to cross the Tay. The ferry landed them at Broughty Ferry, where they boarded a final train to convey them into Dundee.

The Edinburgh, Perth and Dundee Railway was itself taken over by the North British Railway on 29 July 1862, becoming part of that company's increasingly dominant system.

=== A new route to Trinity ===
The inconvenience of the rope-worked tunnel section from Waverley station to Scotland Street was soon made obsolete by advancing technology. The only connection for the transfer of goods wagons from the developing Scottish railway network was through the very sharply curved spur at Waverley station. In 1850 an improved connection between Canal Street and North Bridge stations was made, Edinburgh City Council objections having been satisfied.

The new owners of the line considered how a more fitting connection to Trinity and Granton could be formed, and the result was a new branch from a point nearly two miles east of Waverley station, to Trinity, formed as a conventional railway. The point of convergence with the original line was not far short of Trinity, so that a substantial part of the earlier route was by-passed. There was an east-facing junction and a west-facing junction with the North British Railway main line to Dunbar, at Piershill and Abbeyhill respectively. Where the new line crossed the earlier Leith line, a short spur was put in to connect the two routes, although the point of intersection of the routes themselves was a level crossing at first. Goods trains ran on the new line from 2 March 1868, and passenger trains ran from Waverley station to Leith and Granton from 22 March 1868. (Note: From Smith and Paterson; Ross says that "The line from Piershill to Trinity Junction was opened on 22 May [1868].) Passenger trains to the Canal Street terminus ceased on the same day. There was one intermediate station on the new line at first, at Leith Walk; this was followed by an Abbeyhill station on 1 May 1869.

Scotland Street tunnel was later used to store wagons, then for commercial mushroom production (1887–1929), and as an air raid shelter during World War II. It was also used as an emergency control centre for the LNER during the war. In the 1970s, Cochranes Garages used the north end to store vehicles.

The southern entrance to the tunnel, long obscured, was rediscovered in 1983 during the construction of Waverley Market. The site of Scotland Street station, at the northern end of the tunnel, is now a children's play park.

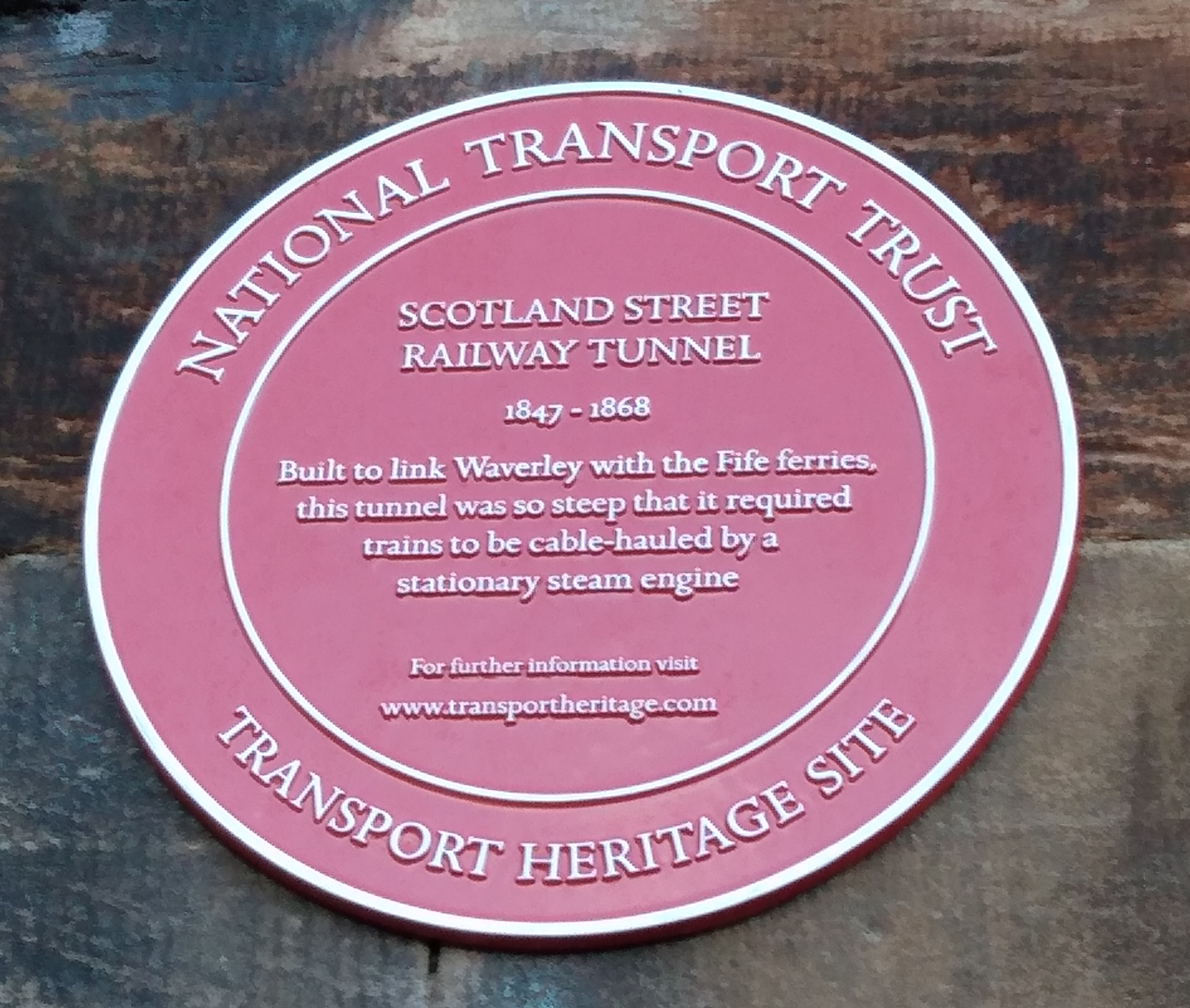
A plaque marking the north end of the Scotland Street Tunnel.

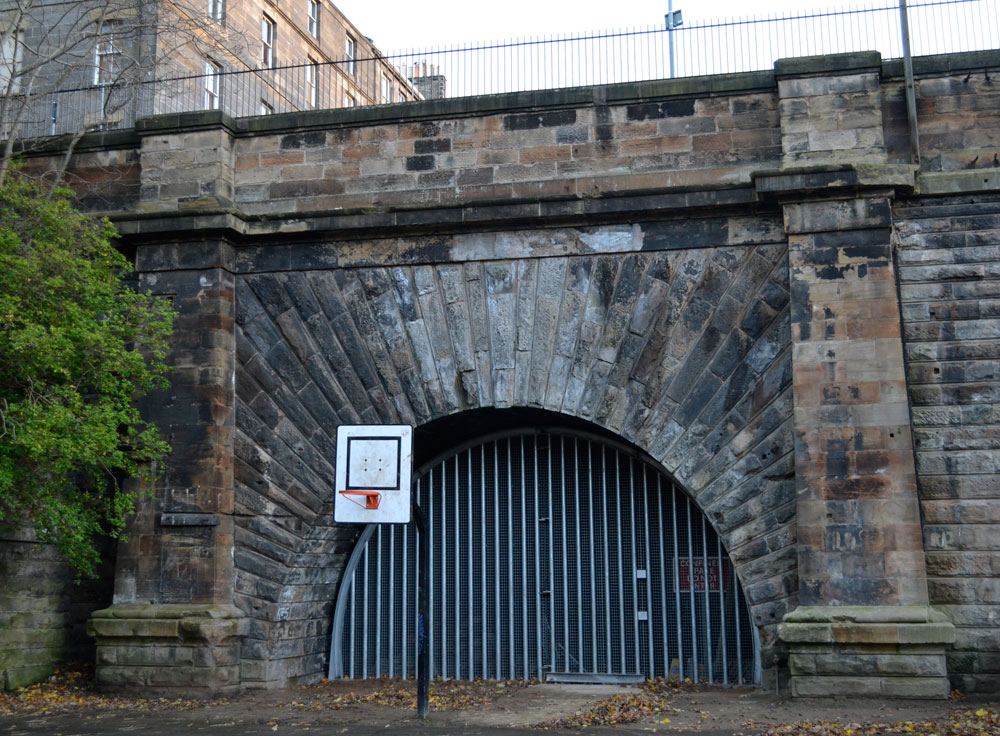
The northern entrance to Scotland Street tunnel in 2012

=== The Forth Bridge ===
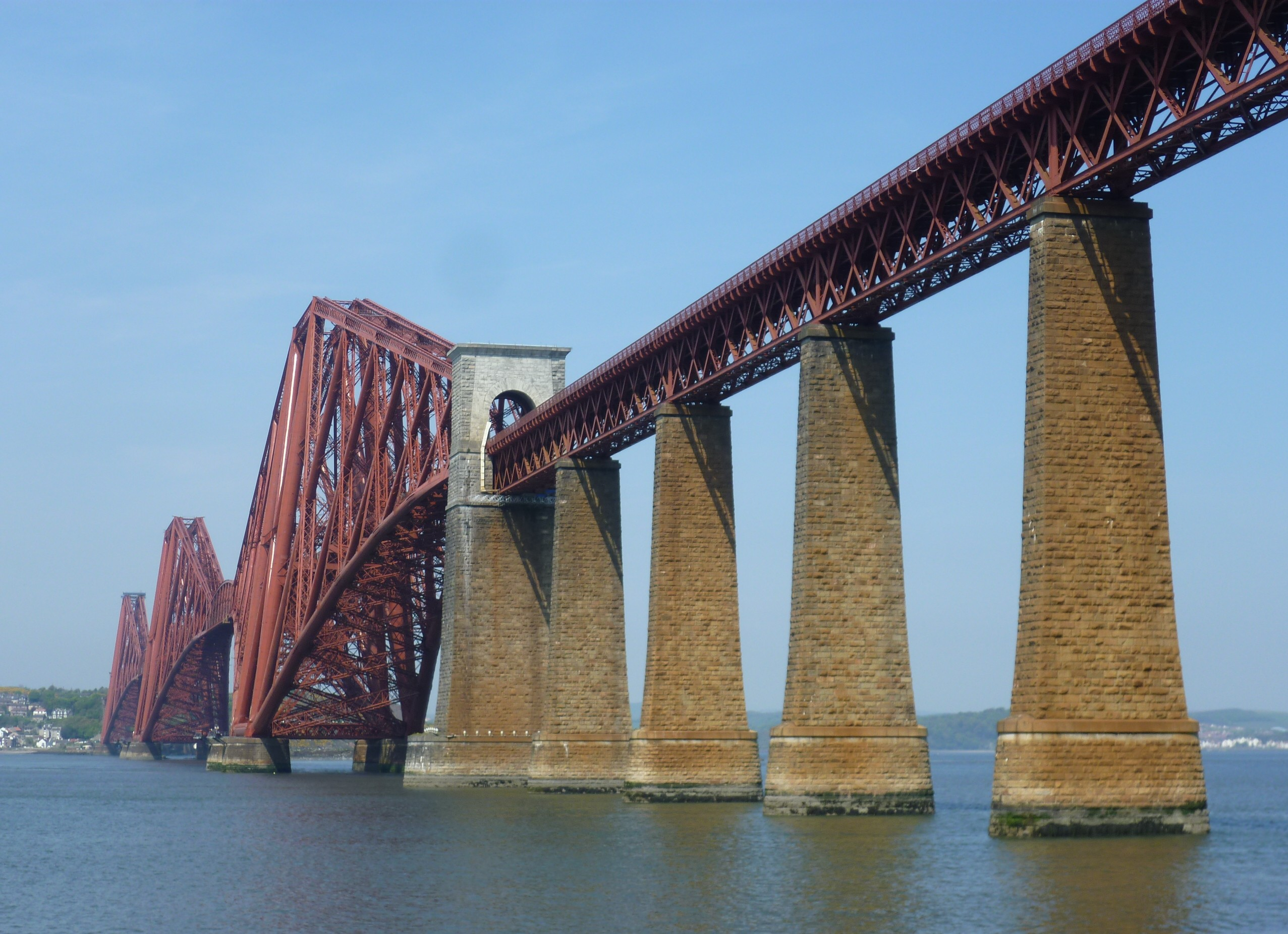
The Forth Bridge seen from South Queensferry

The transit to Fife and Dundee involving a ferry passage from Granton was a serious inconvenience, and a bridge had long been proposed. In 1890 the Forth Bridge opened, crossing the firth at Queensferry. This immediately supplanted the Granton ferry, except for local journeys to places immediately served from Burntisland. The line's purpose as part of a trunk route had vanished, but local travel on the north side of Edinburgh had grown, and coupled with goods traffic to and from the harbours, that now became the traffic on the lines.

=== North side developments ===
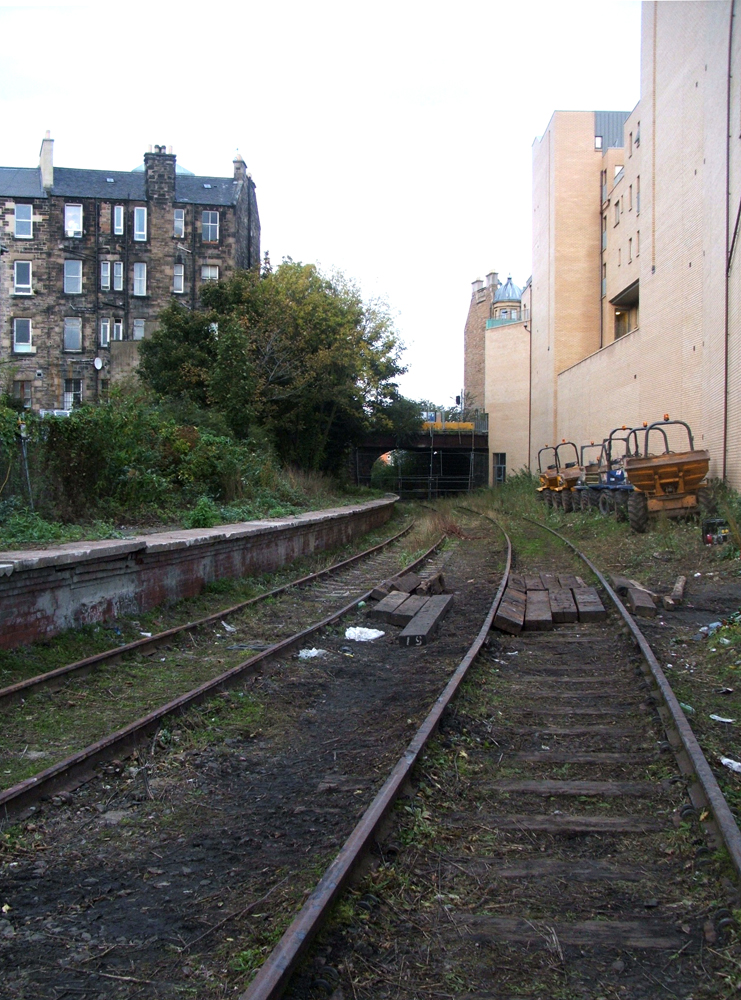
The former Abbeyhill Station

As the city of Edinburgh grew, and residential travel became commonplace, suburban stations were required. A short spur between Abbeyhill and Lochend Junction was provided on 1 October 1886, creating a loop off the main line; this enabled local passenger trains running from Musselburgh and Dunbar to Edinburgh to leave the main line and call at Abbeyhill station; the Edinburgh Suburban and Southside Junction Railway had opened in 1884 and passenger trains from that line also used the Abbeyhill loop. Piershill station on the new loop was opened on 1 May 1891, and a station on the branch itself at Easter Road opened on 1 December 1891. Powderhall station, also on the branch, opened on 22 April 1895, intended speculatively to encourage residential building. This did not take place as quickly as the North British Railway had hoped; nonetheless for some time there were four stations in the short distance from Abbeyhill to Powderhall.

=== Leith stations ===
The nomenclature of the Leith stations was confusing. The former Edinburgh, Leith and Granton Railway (now NBR) terminus of 1846 was on Commercial Street, and was often referred to as the North Leith station. The Edinburgh and Dalkeith Railway (E&DR) had opened a line in 1835; in 1845 the E&DR was taken over by the North British Railway and upgraded; the Leith terminus was referred to as South Leith. The rival Caledonian Railway opened its North Leith branch in 1864. Some time prior to 1868 the NBR used the term Leith (Citadel) in advertising material; this was soon changed to North Leith, and later Leith North.

When the North British Railway received information that the Caledonian Railway was planning a new incursion into the area, the NBR formulated its own plan for a better aligned Leith branch. A double track line from the London Road Junction was built to a new Leith Central station, which opened on 1 July 1903. The junctions at London Road allowed direct running from Waverley or from the Niddrie direction. The new terminus was constructed on a lavish scale, and for some time the local passenger business was heavy.

=== The twentieth century ===
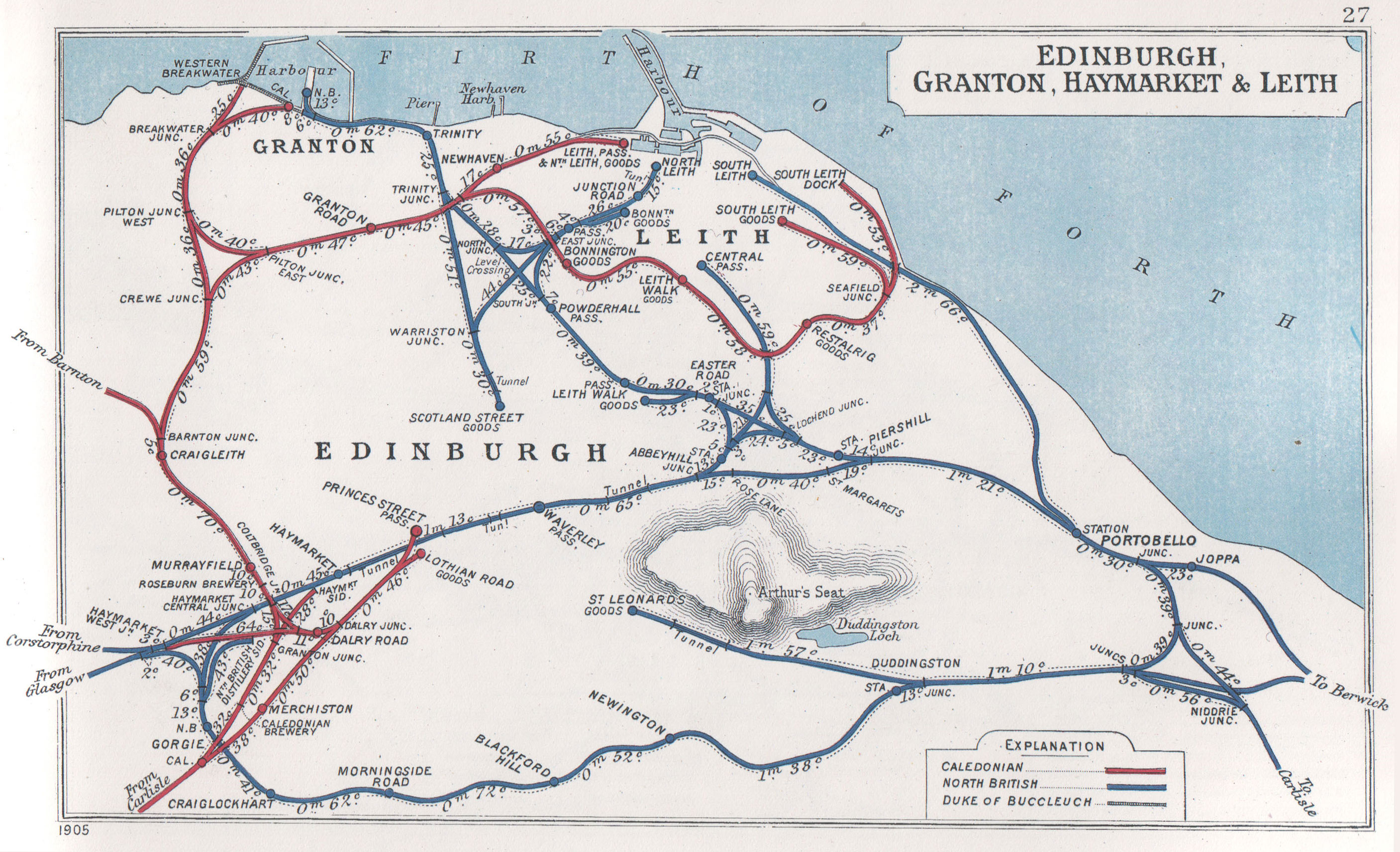
Map showing Edinburgh railways in 1905

In 1902 a short westward connection was made at Granton, serving Granton Gas Works via the Granton Gasworks railway station. Joining in the Granton Harbour railway network, goods interchange with the Caledonian Railway also took place at Granton over the harbour lines, as for some decades the two companies had no direct connection in Edinburgh (other than the Haymarket connection which was unsuitable for goods wagon transfer due to congestion).

The development of passenger tramways in the Edinburgh conurbation in the early years of the twentieth century eroded the suburban railway business, and when economies were required during World War I, Powderhall and Leith Walk stations were closed at the beginning of 1917. Powderhall never reopened, but Leith Walk opened again on 1 February 1919. The tramways were electrified and unified in 1920, and the competition from them assumed new levels, further reducing the ridership of suburban lines.

The Granton route was closed in 1925. Leith Walk station finally closed on 31 March 1930. The passenger service from North Leith to Waverley was closed on 16 June 1947.

The railways of Great Britain had been "grouped" in 1923 following the Railways Act 1921 and the North British Railway was a constituent of the new London and North Eastern Railway. In turn that company was taken into national ownership on the nationalisation of the railways in 1948.

Easter Road Park Halt was opened in 1950, for football traffic to the nearby Hibernian F.C. ground, but by this time the Leith Central branch was nearing its end: on 7 April 1952 the timetabled passenger service closed, although the Easter Road football special trains continued until 1967. There was no goods traffic, but the large layout there served as a carriage depot, and from 1957 it became the principal diesel multiple unit servicing depot in Edinburgh. That use ceased on 29 April 1972 and the station buildings were demolished in 1988.

When the Leith Central branch closed to passengers, Piershill and Abbeyhill stations continued in use by trains leaving the main line for the loop, but they too closed on 7 September 1964. The loop line was retained and used as a diversion for slower trains, and during the 1986 Commonwealth Games a temporary passenger station called Meadowbank Stadium was built for the duration of the games; it was on the site of the earlier Piershill station. It was used occasionally for special events afterwards, but became disused on electrification of the East Coast Main Line in 1989.

The embankment along the shore from Trinity to Granton was removed and landscaped in the 1990s.

Granton gas works continued to forward outward goods traffic, chiefly naphtha, sporadically until 1986.

The former Leith North station building is one of the remaining structures from the original line. It is now (2015) occupied by the Citadel Youth Centre.

== Modern operations (up to 2016) ==
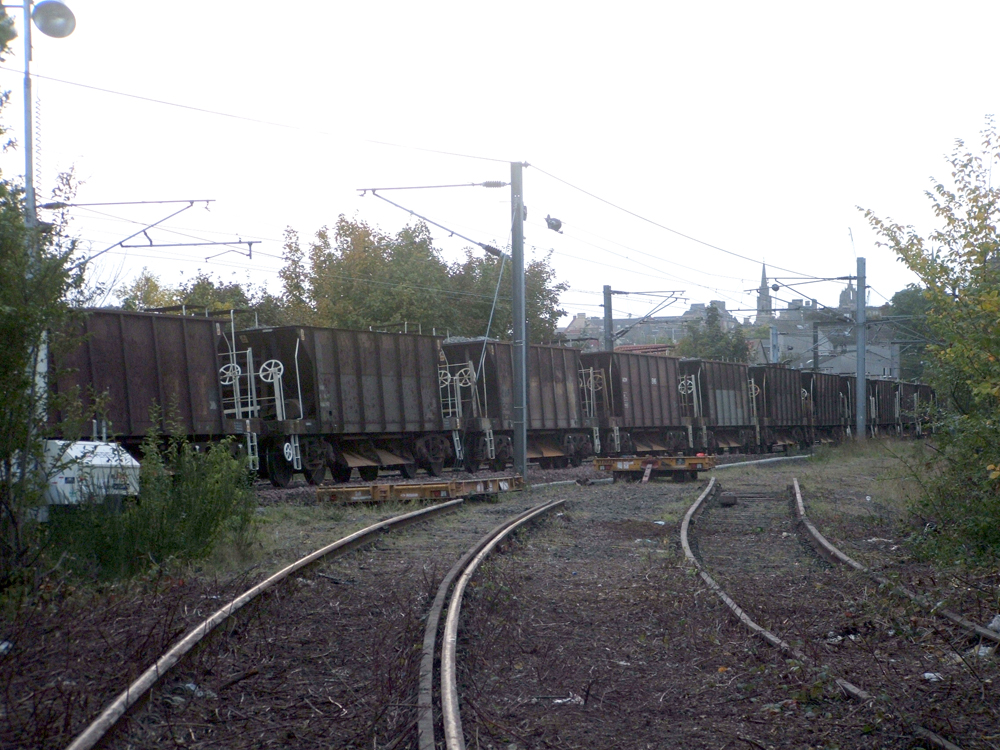
The former connection with the East Coast Main Line at Abbeyhill Junction in 2006

A two-mile (3.2 km) section of the 1868 connecting line, from Powderhall to Craigentinny was still used up to 2016, in connection with the transport of waste from a waste management plant at Powderhall (the former Powderhall Destructor) to a landfill site located in disused limestone workings at East Barns near Dunbar. The plant (now demolished) compacted refuse, brought in by road, into containers which were then conveyed away by rail.

== Topography ==
First main line:

- Princes Street, also known as Canal Street; opened 17 May 1847; closed when services diverted to Waverley on 22 May 1868;
- Scotland Street; opened 31 August 1842; closed (to passengers) 22 May 1868;
- Heriothill Mineral Depot;
- Warriston Junction; divergence of North Leith Branch;
- Trinity Junction; new line converged;
- Trinity; possibly known as Trinity and Newhaven; opened 31 August 1842; transferred to new through station 19 February 1846; closed 1 January 1917; reopened 1 February 1919; closed 2 November 1925;
- Granton; opened 19 February 1846; closed 1 January 1917; reopened 1 February 1919; closed 2 November 1925.

North Leith branch:

- Warriston Junction; divergence from Granton line;
- Bonnington East Junction; convergence of spurs from Bonnington South and North Junctions;
- Bonnington; probably opened 20 May 1846; closed 1 January 1917; 1 April 1919; closed 16 June 1947;
- Junction Road; opened 1 May 1869; closed 1 January 1917; reopened 1 April 1919; renamed Junction Bridge 1923; closed 16 June 1947;
- North Leith; opened 20 May 1846; closed 1 January 1917; reopened 1 April 1919; closed 16 June 1947.

New line:

- Abbeyhill Junction; divergence from main line to Dunbar;
- Abbeyhill; (initially Abbey Hill); opened 1 May 1869; closed 7 September 1964;
- London Road Junction; loop line to Piershill diverged; Leith Central branch diverged;
- Easter Road Junction; line from Piershill converged;
- Easter Road; opened 1 December 1891; closed 1 January 1917; reopened 1 February 1919; closed 16 June 1947;
- Leith Walk; opened 22 May 1868; closed 1 January 1917; reopened 1 February 1919; closed 31 March 1930;
- Bonnington South Junction; spur diverged to Bonnington East Junction;
- Bonnington North Junction; spur converged from Bonnington East Junction;
- Powderhall; opened 22 April 1895; closed 1 January 1917;
- Trinity Junction; convergence with original main line.

Piershill spur:

- Piershill Junction; divergence from Dunbar to Edinburgh line;
- Piershill; opened 22 March 1868; closed 1 January 1917; reopened 1 April 1919; closed 7 September 1964; reopened as Meadowbank for special events 14 June 1986; close
- Lochend South Junction; line to Leith Central diverged;
- London Road Junction; convergence with line from Powderhall to Abbeyhill Junction.

Leith Central branch:

- London Road Junction; divergence from New Line;
- Lochend North Junction; line from Piershall converged;
- Easter Road Park Halt; opened 8 April 1950 for football traffic; closed 1967 (after cessation of timetabled passenger services on the branch);
- Leith Central; opened 1 July 1903; closed 7 April 1952.
