= Easter Road (disambiguation) =

Easter Road is a football stadium in Edinburgh, Scotland.

Easter Road may also refer to:

- Easter Road (street), a main road in Edinburgh
- Easter Road railway station, a station in Edinburgh from 1891 to 1947
- Easter Road Park Halt railway station, a station in Edinburgh from 1950 to 1967
