= Portobello railway station (NBR) =

Closed railway station in the City of Edinburgh council area, Scotland

Portobello

General information
- Location: Portobello, City of Edinburgh; Scotland
- Coordinates: 55.9497°N 3.1177°W
- Grid reference: NT303735
- Platforms: 2

Other information
- Status: Disused

History
- Original company: North British Railway
- Pre-grouping: North British Railway
- Post-grouping: LNER

Key dates
- 22 June 1846: Opened
- 1890: Rebuilt
- 7 September 1964: Closed
Location
- Location within the City of Edinburgh council area

Portobello railway station was located at Station Brae, off Southfield Place, in the Portobello area of Edinburgh, Scotland, with footpath access from other locations. The station was opened in 1846 by the North British Railway. It replaced an earlier Portobello station nearby on the Edinburgh and Dalkeith Railway.

== History ==
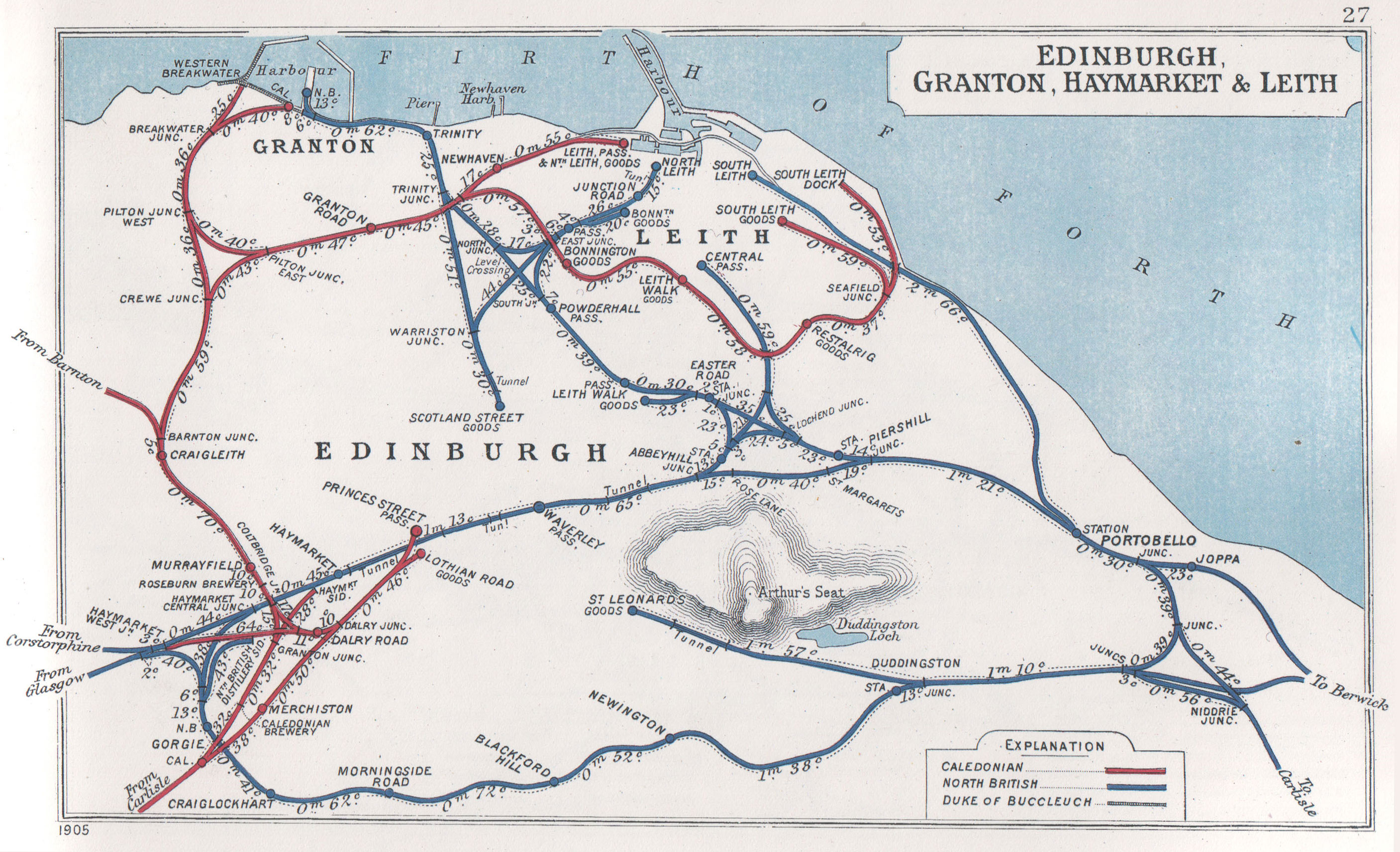
A 1905 Railway Clearing House diagram of Edinburgh railways, with the SSJR (in blue along the bottom)

The station was rebuilt in 1887-1890.

During its lifetime, as rail services evolved, Portobello was served by most passenger trains running out of the east end of Waverley including stopping trains on the Berwick and Carlisle main lines and through trains to the various branches, e.g. Musselburgh, North Berwick, Gifford, Glencorse, Penicuik, Polton, Dalkeith, but excepting express and semi-fast long-distance trains and a few limited stop residential trains (as they were then known), for example some North Berwick and Dunbar trains.

There was a service to South Leith from a separate platform. Following the opening of Leith Central in 1903, to which Edinburgh south suburban circle trains via Portobello ran, the South Leith service was rapidly run down and then withdrawn in 1905.

Although the station was accessible from residential areas in several directions, and not much more than 300 metres away from more densely populated High Street area, tram and bus services from the High Street to a range of destinations across the city centre abstracted traffic from the rail service. Until the end of operation some of those commuters for whom the service was convenient continued to travel home for lunch, a benefit from their season ticket purchase but of no financial benefit to the railway.

== Closure ==
Portobello was not included in the list of stations proposed for closure in the "Reshaping of British Railways" report of March 1963 but was added later (as some other services and stations were), closing 7 September 1964.

In the final two years of its existence services were provided mainly by trains to Corstorphine, Musselburgh and North Berwick. Portobello Station closed on and from Monday 7 September 1964 (when the Edinburgh-Musselburgh rail service was withdrawn with the closure also of Abbeyhill, Piershill, Joppa and Musselburgh stations).

== Future ==
A local campaigning group, the Capital Rail Action Group (CRAG), is running a campaign for Portobello Station to be re-opened to passenger services, as the station lies on the line served by Edinburgh Crossrail between Edinburgh Waverley and Brunstane. Journey times to Waverley have been estimated at 5 minutes, in contrast to the half-hour journey by bus.

CRAG is also campaigning for the ESSJR south suburban railway which loops around Edinburgh's Southside back to Haymarket. The group proposes that it should be operated either as a commuter rail service or as a light rail system to form an extension of the Edinburgh Tram Network. Following a petition submitted to the Scottish Parliament in 2007, the proposal was rejected in 2009 by transport planners due to anticipated cost.

Preceding station	Historical railways	Following station
Jock's Lodge; Line open, station closed	North British Railway; NBR Main Line	Joppa; Line open, station closed
South Leith; Line and station closed	North British Railway; Edinburgh and Dalkeith Railway	Millerhill; Line open, station closed
Piershill; Line open but partially disused, station closed	North British Railway; Edinburgh Suburban Line	Duddingston & Craigmillar; Line open, station closed
