= Portobello =

Portobello, Porto Bello, Port of Bello, Porto Belo, Portabello, or Portabella may refer to:

== Places ==
=== Brazil ===
- Porto Belo

=== Ireland ===
- Portobello, Dublin
- Cathal Brugha Barracks, Dublin formerly Portobello Barracks

=== New Zealand ===
- Portobello, New Zealand, on Otago Peninsula
- Portobello Marine Laboratory
- Portobello Bay, on Otago Peninsula near the town of Portobello
- Portobello Peninsula, a spur of Otago Peninsula

=== Panama ===
- Portobelo, Colón Province
  - Battle of Porto Bello (disambiguation)

=== United Kingdom ===
- Portobello, Edinburgh
- Portobello Road, London
- Portobello, an area south-east of Birtley
- Portobello, West Midlands
- Portobello, a housing estate in Wakefield, West Yorkshire

=== United States ===
- Portabello Estate, Corona Del Mar, California; previously owned by American businessman Frank Pritt
- Porto Bello (Drayden, Maryland)
- Porto Bello (Williamsburg, Virginia)

== TV series ==
- Portobello (2025 TV series), an upcoming television miniseries for HBO Max
- Portobello (1977 TV series), an Italian Friday night variety show created and hosted by Enzo Tortora

== Other uses ==
- Porto Bello (Caribbean), a fictional British colony in the Long John Silver film and The Adventures of Long John Silver TV series
- Portobello (novel), a 2008 novel by Ruth Rendell
- Portobello Books, a publishing imprint founded in 2005 by Sigrid Rausing and merged with Granta Books imprint after Rausing's 2006 purchase of Granta
- Portobello College, former law school in Ireland acquired by Dublin Business School
- Portobello House, a country house in the Vale of Glamorgan, South Wales
- Portobello mushroom, common name of Agaricus bisporus
- Portobello Productions, incorporating Portobello Pictures, a British film, TV, and theatre production company

== See also ==
- Portobello railway station (disambiguation)
- Battle of Porto Bello (disambiguation)
