= Girtanner =

Girtanner is a surname of Swiss origin. Notable people with the surname include:

- Christopher Girtanner (1760–1800), Swiss scientist
- Georg Albert Girtanner (1839–1907), Swiss physician and naturalist
