= Easter Road =

Football stadium in Edinburgh, Scotland

Easter Road Stadium
- The Leith San Siro; The Holy Ground
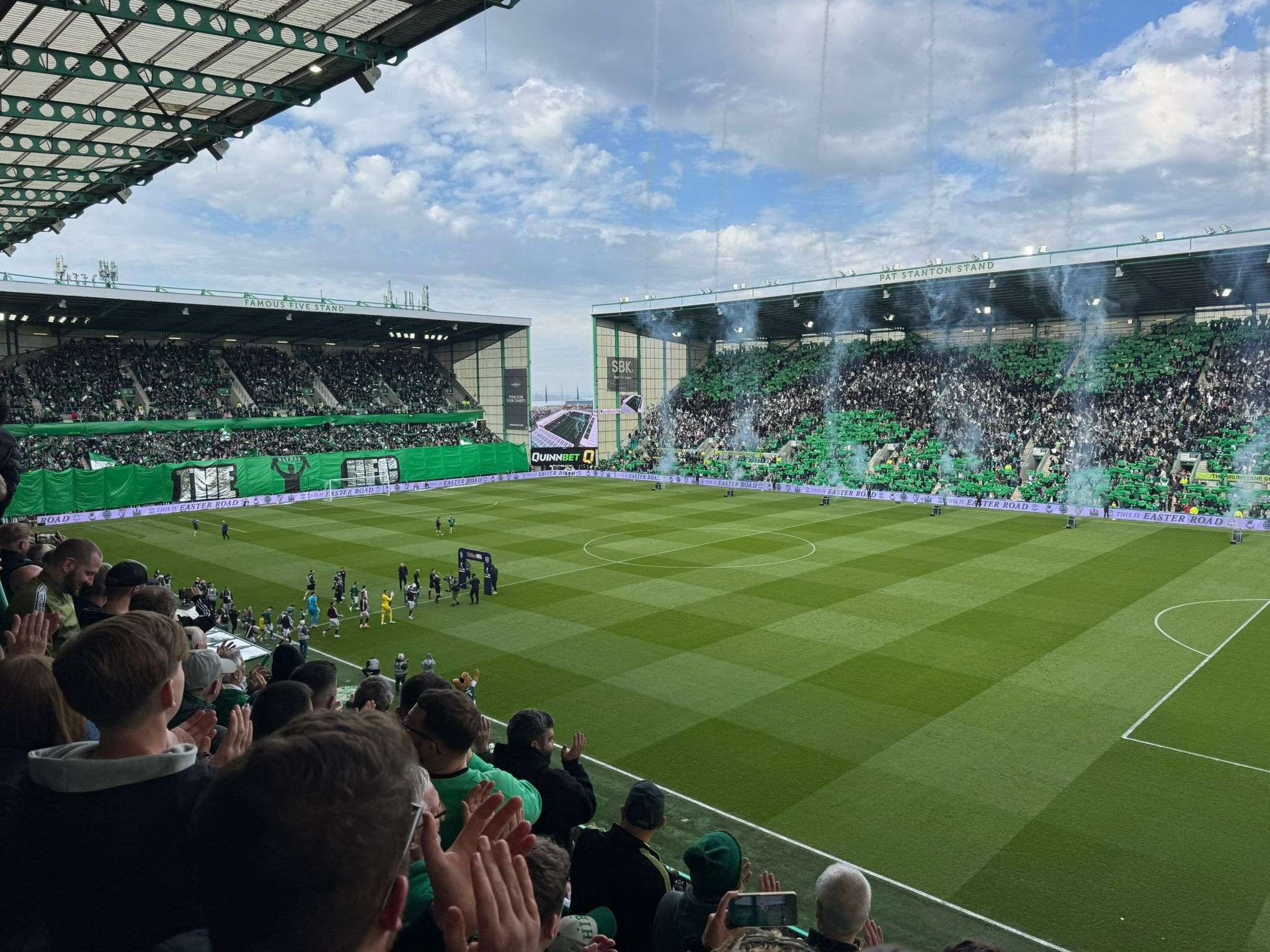
- Easter Road before an Edinburgh derby match on 26 April 2026. UEFA

- Location in Edinburgh
- Location: 12 Albion Place; Edinburgh; EH7 5QG
- Coordinates: 55°57′42″N 3°9′56″W
- Owner: Hibernian F.C.
- Capacity: 20,421
- Surface: Hybrid
- Record attendance: 65,860 v Hearts; 2 January 1950

Construction
- Groundbreaking: 1892; 134 years ago
- Opened: 1893; 133 years ago
- Renovated: 2010; 16 years ago
- Architects: Percy Johnson-Marshall (Famous Five and South Stands)

Tenants
- Hibernian F.C. Edinburgh Rugby: 1893–present 1998–1999

Easter Road is a football stadium located in the Leith area of Edinburgh, Scotland, which is the home ground of Scottish Premiership club Hibernian (Hibs). The stadium currently has an all-seated capacity of 20,421, which makes it the sixth-largest football stadium in Scotland. Easter Road is also known by Hibs fans as "The Holy Ground" or "The Leith San Siro". The venue has also been used to stage international matches, Scottish League Cup semi-finals and was briefly the home ground of the Edinburgh professional rugby union team.

Hibs first played at the present site of Easter Road in 1893. The ground holds the record attendance for a Scottish match outside Glasgow, when 65,860 attended an Edinburgh derby on 2 January 1950. The size of the terracing was greatly reduced in the 1980s. After the publication of the Taylor Report, Hibs considered leaving Easter Road and moving to a different site (Straiton, near Loanhead, was mooted), but these plans were abandoned in 1994. Redevelopment of the stadium began in 1995 and was completed in 2010. The Easter Road pitch had a pronounced slope until it was removed in 2000.

== History ==
=== Early history (1893–1945) ===
Hibernian played its first match on the Meadows, on 25 December 1875. The club first moved to the Easter Road area in 1880, to a ground known as Hibernian Park. This location had the advantage of being equidistant between their two main sources of support, the Irish immigrant communities in the port of Leith and the Old Town of Edinburgh. When Hibs suffered financial difficulties in the early 1890s, the lease on Hibernian Park expired and developers started building what would become Bothwell Street. The club was reformed in 1892 and a lease on a piece of land called Drum Park was secured. The site had restricted access from Easter Road, a pronounced slope and was in close proximity to Bank Park, the home of Leith Athletic. There was a sense of continuity from the previous ground, however, and the supporters were keen to get started again. The first match at Easter Road was played on 4 February 1893, a friendly against Clyde.

Easter Road in the 1950s.

Easter Road staged its first Scottish League match when Hibs joined the league in 1893. Hibs were only renting Easter Road, which Edinburgh city planners had designated for future development. This meant the club were unwilling to develop the ground and looked for alternatives. Hibs considered relocating to Aberdeen in 1902, a year before Aberdeen FC was formed by a merger of three local clubs. In 1909, work began on a potential new ground in the Piershill area of Edinburgh, but the North British Railway company won a court order allowing them to build a railway line over the ground. No line was ever built, but Hibs' interest in moving to the site was thwarted. The long-term future of Easter Road was only secured in 1922, when the club agreed a 25-year lease on the ground. Two years later, three banks of terraces were raised, while a main stand seating 4,480 people was built on the west side of the ground. The redeveloped stadium had a capacity of 45,000. The pitch was also moved 40 yards to the east, providing space for the main stand. The slope was reduced to approximately 6 feet as part of this work.

=== Post-war (1945–1991) ===
Hibs enjoyed great success in the period immediately after the end of the Second World War, winning three league championships between 1948 and 1952. The club's participation in the (inaugural) 1955–56 European Cup meant that Easter Road became the first British ground to host European Cup football. A record attendance of 65,860 was set by an Edinburgh derby against Hearts played on 2 January 1950. This is also a record for any football match played in Edinburgh. As the fans had been tightly packed on the terraces to achieve this record attendance, the size of the East Terrace was increased further. The club even drew up plans to expand the overall capacity to nearly 100,000. This would have been done by raising each end terrace to the same height as the east side, but these plans were never realised.

Hibs were one of the first clubs to install corner floodlight pylons, rather than the roof-mounted lights used at Ibrox. The Easter Road floodlights were installed by a local company, Miller & Stables, who would construct similar leaning gantries in many other Scottish grounds. They were first used for an Edinburgh derby played on 18 October 1954. A roof was put over the North Terrace in the early 1960s, but the ground was largely unchanged through the 1960s and 1970s. The capacity was reduced in 1975 to 30,000, due to the regulations of the Safety of Sports Grounds Act. Hibs became the first club in Scotland to install undersoil heating, in 1980. Benches were installed in the North Terrace in 1982, but this was only because they were cheaper than replacing the terrace crush barriers. Soon afterwards, Hibs chairman Kenny Waugh admitted that the stadium was a "mess".

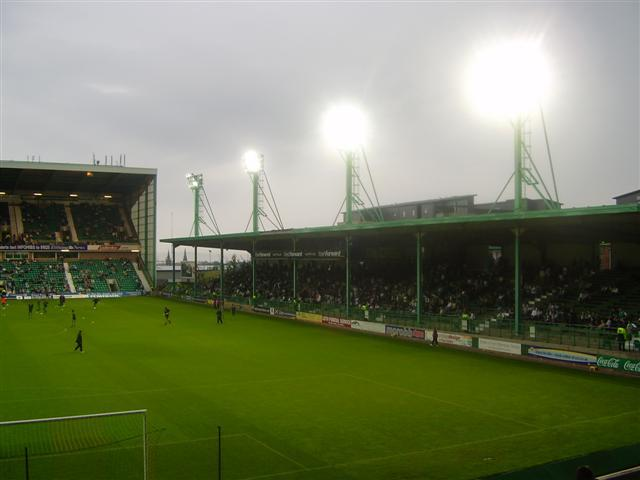
The East Stand, which was built in this form in 1985 and demolished in March 2010.

The height of the East Terrace was greatly reduced and a roof was erected in the mid-1980s. This work reduced the capacity to 27,000. Hibs was taken over by a consortium led by David Duff in 1987. The new regime spent approximately £1 million on executive boxes and refurbishments, but their policy of diversifying the business into property and public houses crippled the club financially when there was an economic downturn in the late 1980s. Hearts chairman Wallace Mercer attempted a takeover of Hibs in June 1990, with the intention of merging the two major Edinburgh football clubs. The Hibs fans protested against this and Mercer was prevented from gaining the 75% shareholding that was needed to close Hibs.

=== Redevelopment (1991–2010) ===
Sir Tom Farmer took control of Hibs in 1991, but the club was still faced with the need to develop a stadium that would meet the requirements of the Taylor Report. Hibs entered talks with Edinburgh District Council about sharing a new stadium with Hearts, but the proposed site of Ingliston was in the wrong part of the city for Hibs. The club was more interested in the possibility of playing at Meadowbank Stadium, only a few hundred yards from Easter Road, but there were planning difficulties with adapting Meadowbank into a large football stadium. The reorganisation of the club after Farmer took control meant that there was no real pressure to move, as he also owned Easter Road. The Hibs board made an assessment, however, that the ground could not be renovated in a cost-effective fashion before the August 1994 deadline set by the Taylor Report. Hibs proposed in January 1992 to sell Easter Road and move to a site owned by Farmer in Straiton. Hibs also invited Hearts to share this stadium, as their proposal for a site in Millerhill had been rejected by planners. Those plans were scaled down in 1993 when Lothian Regional Council refused to allow the rest of the Straiton site to be used for commercial development. The Hibs board continued to back the Straiton proposal and they insisted the installation of bucket seats in the uncovered South Terrace was merely to comply with the Taylor Report deadline. This measure also reduced the capacity of Easter Road to 13,500.

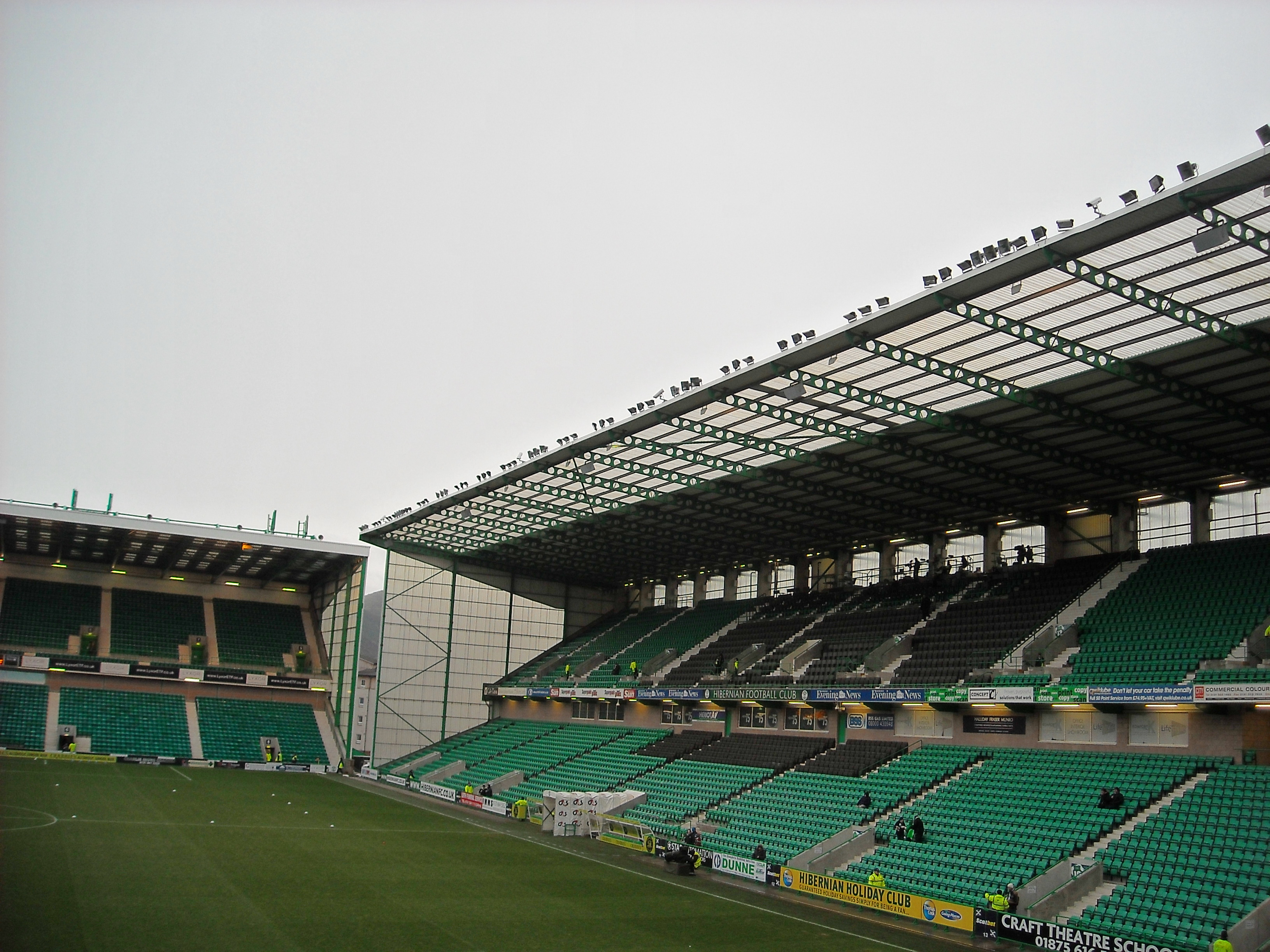
The West Stand, constructed in 2001.

Later in 1994, however, the Straiton proposals were abandoned and Easter Road underwent major redevelopment in 1995. Stands behind each goal were built at a cost of £8 million, increasing the capacity to 16,531. The ground was made all seated by the installation of bucket seats in the East Terrace during 1995. Views of the pitch from this stand were somewhat restricted by supporting pillars. The Easter Road slope, which meant that the north end of the pitch was 6 feet lower than the south, was removed at the end of the 1999–00 season. The West Stand was built in 2001 to replace the ageing main stand, increasing capacity to 17,500.

Despite this development work, a move to a shared stadium in Straiton was again proposed in 2003. Hibs hoped that selling the Easter Road site would allow them to clear their debts and reduce costs. Club director Rod Petrie commented that any decision would be based on financial grounds and after consultation with the fanbase, as the club were not being forced to move. Farmer expressed support for further redeveloping Easter Road, if it could be part of a viable business plan. During the consultation, Farmer said that his main priority was ensuring the club's survival and denied that any deal had been concluded. The consultation found that the fans were largely opposed to the Straiton proposal, which the club eventually abandoned. To remove part of the debt, the club sold some land to the east of the stadium that had previously been used for car parking. Selling players, including Steven Whittaker, Scott Brown, Kevin Thomson and Steven Fletcher, also funded these debts and further work.

The club first obtained planning permission to replace the East Stand in 1999, and this was renewed in 2005. Hibs started a consultation with supporters on its redevelopment in 2007. The development was put on hold until sufficient cash resources were obtained to finance the project. The consultation process found that a single tier stand would be most popular with the fans. Petrie announced at the 2009 annual general meeting that the club would enter negotiations with contractors to establish the cost of rebuilding the stand. After these negotiations were concluded, Hibs announced in February 2010 that work would immediately begin on a new East Stand, increasing capacity to 20,421. Demolition of the old stand began in early March, and the stand was opened a month ahead of schedule in August 2010.

=== Recent developments (since 2020) ===
Large video screens were installed into the corners between the East Stand and the two end stands in 2021. Hibs announced in January 2024 that rail seats would be put into the lower tier of the Famous Five stand, with a view to introducing safe standing from the 2024–25 season. The East Stand was renamed the Pat Stanton Stand in July 2025.

== Structure and facilities ==
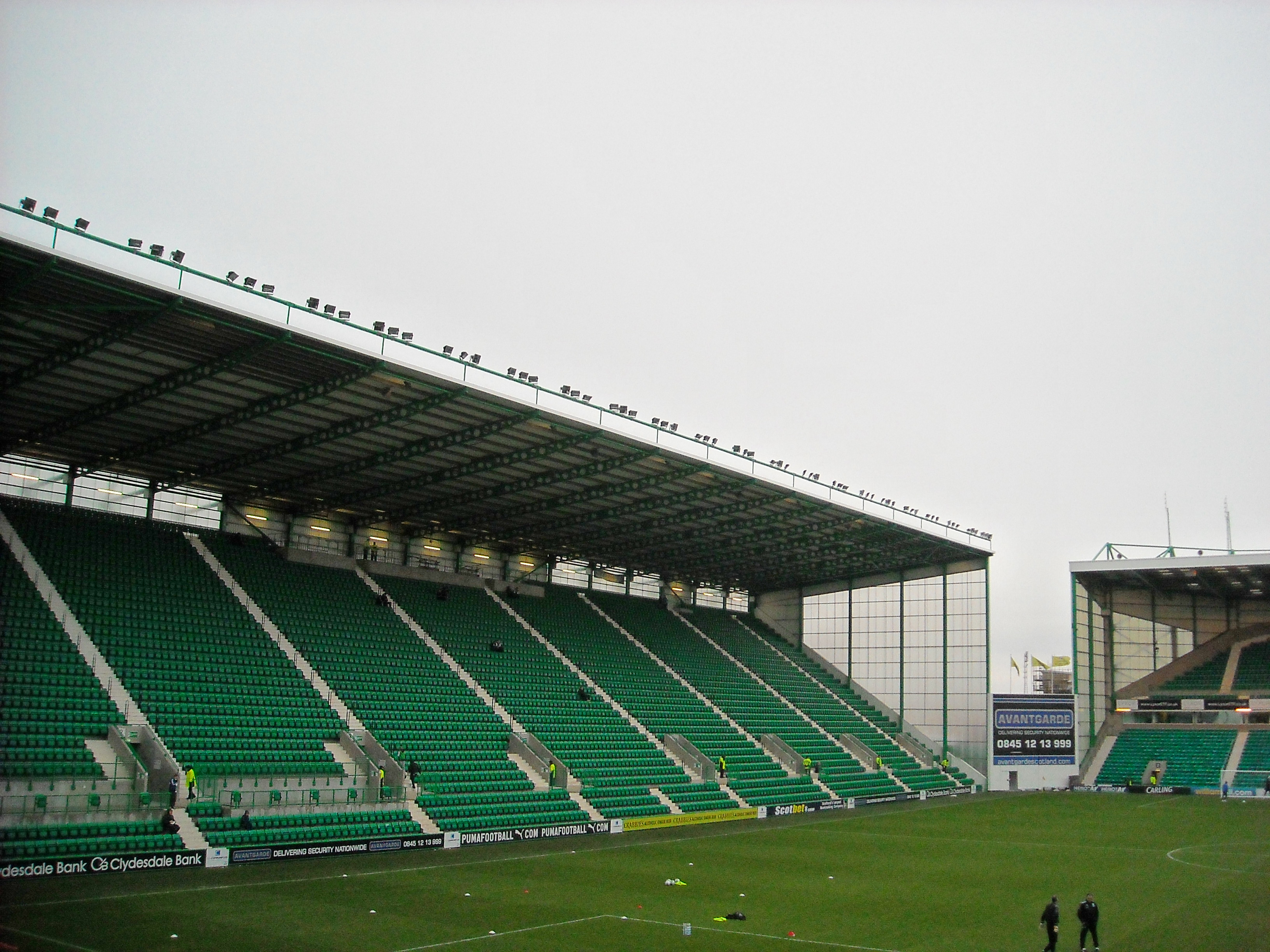
The new East Stand, since renamed the Pat Stanton Stand, opened in August 2010.

Easter Road is an all-seated stadium, split into four geographic sections, known as the Famous Five (formerly North), Pat Stanton (formerly East), South and West stands. The Famous Five and South stands are the oldest part of the present stadium, built in 1995. Each stand has two tiers, a cantilevered roof and a capacity of nearly 4,000. To keep within the boundaries of the site, the upper deck of each stand angles toward the centre. When the stands were built, the Famous Five Stand was above pitch level and the South Stand was below, but this was corrected when the natural slope was removed. Each stand also stretched beyond the east touchline, which was corrected by widening the pitch when the East Stand was rebuilt. Between the two tiers of the Famous Five Stand there are function suites and lounges. Before the stands were rebuilt in the 1990s, the north and south ends of Easter Road were known as the Cowshed and Dunbar End respectively. The southern end was called the Dunbar End because there was a lemonade factory named Dunbar's located behind it.

The West Stand, which initially had a capacity of 6,500, was built in 2001. A reception area, club offices, media centre, banqueting suites, hospitality area and changing rooms are located in the West Stand. The capacity of the West Stand was reduced slightly when the new East Stand was constructed in 2010, as the pitch was widened during this development. The East Stand, which is the newest part of the stadium, was built in 2010. It is the only stand that is not split into two tiers and has a capacity of 6,400. The decision to build the East Stand as a single tier was taken to maintain the character of the old terrace, which had been a simple viewing area without many facilities.

== Other uses ==
=== Other football matches ===
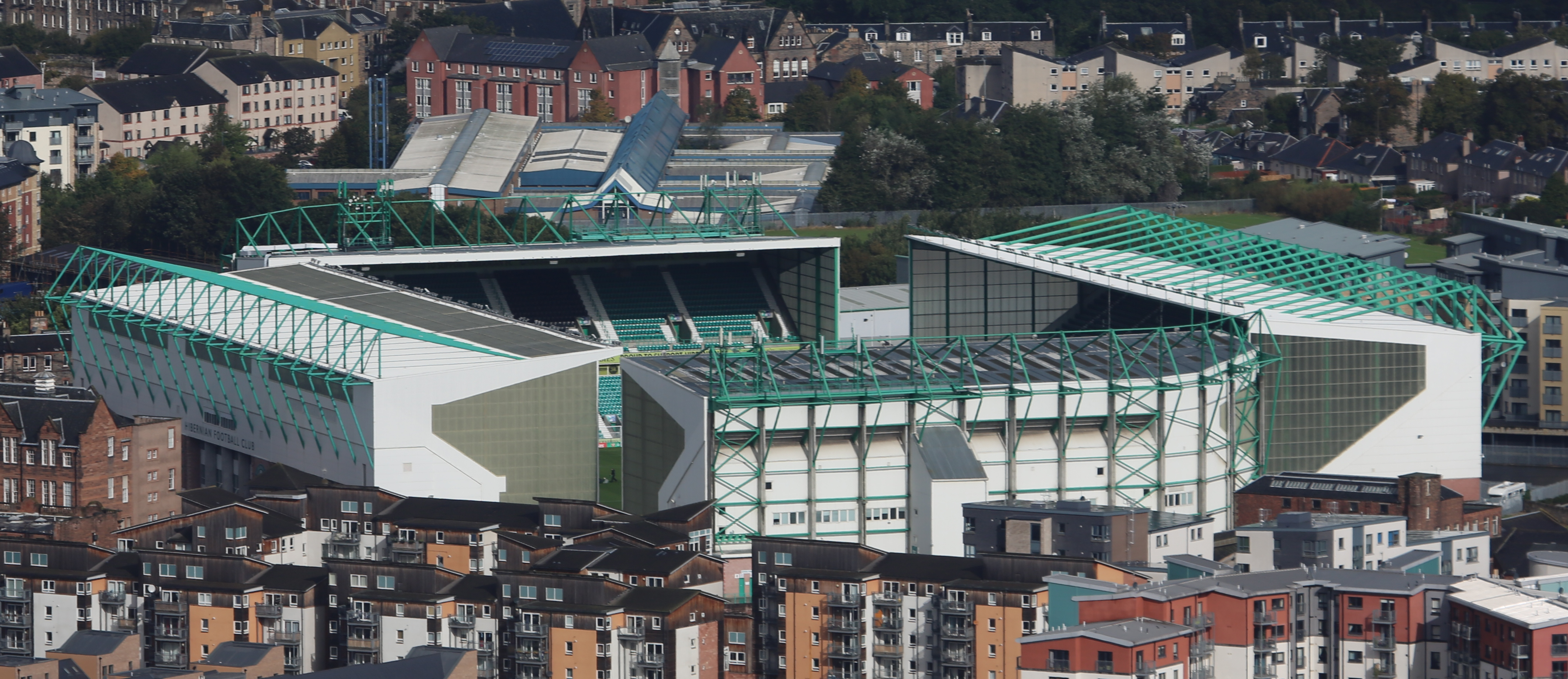
The exterior of Easter Road

Kirkcaldy club Raith Rovers used Easter Road as a home venue once, for the home leg of a UEFA Cup tie against Bayern Munich in 1995. The match was moved from Rovers' normal home ground of Stark's Park due to Easter Road's greater capacity. Easter Road has sometimes played host to Scottish League Cup semi-final matches, such as in the 1996, 1998, 2004, 2005, 2006, 2013 and 2014 competitions. Team managers Terry Butcher and Gus MacPherson objected to playing semi-finals at Easter Road, on the grounds that their players should have the chance to play at Hampden Park, or that playing against Hearts in Edinburgh gives them a form of home advantage. The 2014 Scottish Challenge Cup Final between Raith Rovers and Rangers was hosted at Easter Road.

Scotland have played seven full international matches at Easter Road. These have been friendly matches against less attractive opposition where a relatively small crowd was expected, and it has therefore been unnecessary to play the match at Hampden Park. The Scotland under-21 team has also sometimes played matches at Easter Road, such as when Scotland played Iceland in the 2011 UEFA European Under-21 Football Championship qualification play-offs. The most recent full international played at the stadium was a friendly match between Scotland and Canada in March 2017. One full international was played at Easter Road that did not involve Scotland, a friendly match between South Korea and Ghana that was played in advance of the 2006 World Cup.

Scotland women played their first match at Easter Road in August 2019, a Euro 2021 qualifying match against Cyprus. In November 2025, Easter Road was listed as a potential host venue for the 2035 FIFA Women's World Cup.

==== Full internationals ====
===== Men's =====
Between 1988 and 2017, eight full men's international football matches have been played at Easter Road.

Men's international matches played at Easter Road
Date	Team #1	Result	Team #2	Competition	Attendance	Ref.
22 April 1998	Scotland	1–1	Finland	Friendly	14,315	
15 October 2002	Scotland	3–1	Canada	Friendly	16,207	
30 May 2004	Scotland	4–1	Trinidad and Tobago	Friendly	16,187	
17 November 2004	Scotland	1–4	Sweden	Friendly	15,071	
4 June 2006	South Korea	1–3	Ghana	Friendly	7,600	
15 August 2012	Scotland	3–1	Australia	Friendly	11,110	
5 June 2015	Scotland	1–0	Qatar	Friendly	14,270	
22 March 2017	Scotland	1–1	Canada	Friendly	9,158	

===== Women's =====
Easter Road hosted its first women's international match in August 2019.

Women's international matches played at Easter Road
Date	Team #1	Result	Team #2	Competition	Attendance	Ref.
30 August 2019	Scotland	8–0	Cyprus	Euro 2021 qualifying	6,206	
1 December 2020	Scotland	0–1	Finland	Euro 2021 qualifying	189	
29 October 2024	Scotland	4–0	Hungary	Euro 2025 qualifying play-offs	8,790	
29 November 2024	Scotland	0–0	Finland	Euro 2025 qualifying play-offs	7,256	
14 April 2026	Scotland	1–1	Belgium	2027 World Cup qualification	4,522	

=== Other sports ===
Easter Road was briefly the home ground for Edinburgh Rugby, a professional rugby union team, in the late 1990s. Heineken Cup matches against Ebbw Vale and Toulouse were played at the ground during the 1998–99 season, with attendances of a few thousand. Edinburgh again expressed interest in using Easter Road in both 2004 and 2006, but this was opposed by Hibs manager Tony Mowbray, who was concerned that playing rugby would damage the pitch. The Scottish Rugby Union (SRU) included Easter Road in a bid for Edinburgh to host the Heineken Cup and European Challenge Cup finals in 2014. In June 2015, the SRU chief executive indicated that trial matches could be played at Easter Road with a view to Edinburgh Rugby moving there for a longer term. It has since been announced that the team will move to Myreside from January 2017.

One of the hospitality suites within the stadium staged an amateur boxing show on 15 November 2009.

=== Uses other than sport ===
Elton John performed Easter Road's first rock concert on 25 June 2005. The international headquarters of the Homeless World Cup is based in the South Stand of the stadium.

== Transport ==
Edinburgh Waverley, the main railway station in Edinburgh, is approximately 1.5 miles (2.4 km) from the stadium; the walk between the two sites takes approximately 20 minutes. An extension to the Edinburgh Trams system, which serves the stadium via the McDonald Road tram stop on Leith Walk, began operating on 7 June 2023. There was a railway halt immediately beside the ground, part of the Edinburgh, Leith and Newhaven Railway, which was opened in 1950 and closed in 1967.

Easter Road is served by several Lothian Buses routes. Services 7, 10, 11, 12, 14, 16, 22, 25 and 49 run down Leith Walk; services 1 and 35 run down Easter Road itself; services 4, 5, 15, 19, 26, 34 and 44 run along London Road and routes 34 and 49 serve Lochend Road. Several of these routes were affected by the tram construction works. East Coast Buses routes X5, X7, X24/124, 104 and 113 also serve the area. Visitors to the ground travelling by car can park in the surrounding streets.

== See also ==
- List of stadiums in the United Kingdom by capacity
- Lists of stadiums
