= Abbeyhill railway station =

Disused railway station in Edinburgh, Scotland

Coordinates: 55.95658°N 3.16702°W

Abbeyhill
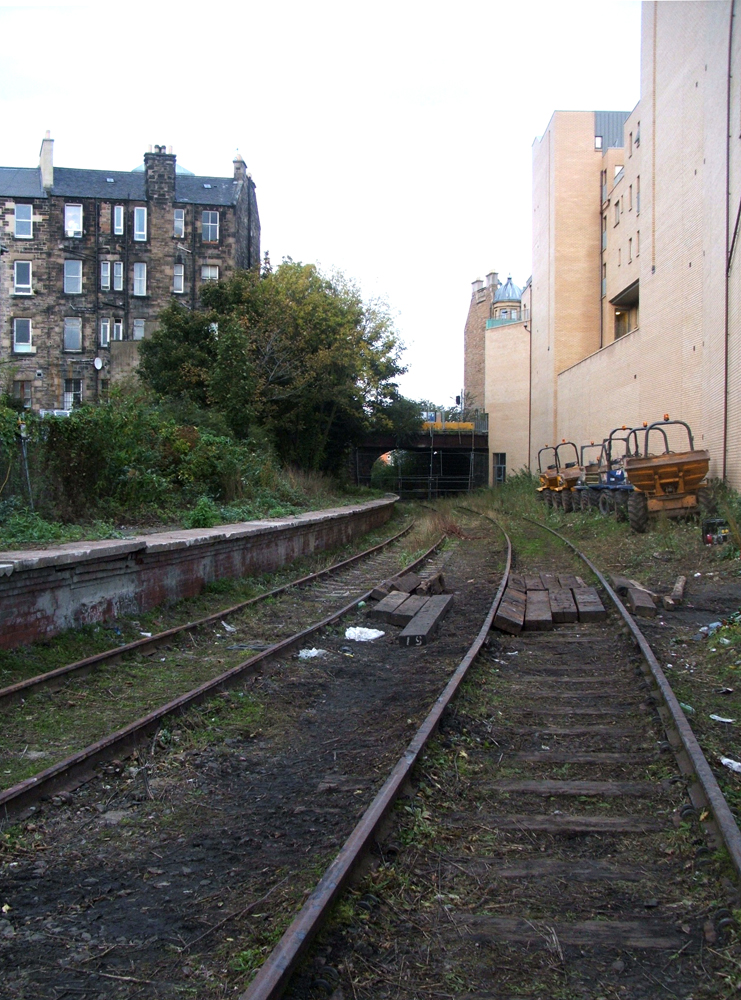
- Abbeyhill Station, closed in 1964, is now derelict.

General information
- Location: Edinburgh, City of Edinburgh; Scotland
- Platforms: 2

Other information
- Status: Disused

History
- Original company: North British Railway
- Pre-grouping: North British Railway
- Post-grouping: London and North Eastern Railway

Key dates
- 1 May 1869: Opened
- 7 September 1964: Closed
Location
- Location within the City of Edinburgh council area

Abbeyhill railway station was a railway station located in the Abbeyhill area of Edinburgh. It was served by trains on several Edinburgh local rail services. The station was on the line that branched off the East Coast Main Line at Abbeyhill Junction.

== History ==
Opened by the North British Railway on 1 May 1869, it became part of the London and North Eastern Railway during the Grouping of 1923. The line then passed on to the Scottish Region of British Railways on nationalisation in 1948. The station was closed by the British Railways Board in 1964 along with Piershill, Portobello, Joppa and Musselburgh stations when the Musselburgh branch service was withdrawn. One station platform still exists but is covered by overgrown weeds and shrubs.

== Abbeyhill Junction ==
Abbeyhill Junction connected the East Coast Main Line towards Abbeyhill railway station. Passenger services stopped using this line in the 1960s but briefly reopened in 1986 as a shuttle service was set up from Waverley station and Meadowbank Stadium railway station for the Commonwealth Games. Abbeyhill Junction signal box closed on 6 November 1938, when an old box at Waverley East took over control of the junction.

The junction closed in 1986 as the line was not being used any more, even for freight. In 1988, the tracks were disconnected at both ends of the line. The tracks remained, overgrown, for over 18 years until 2007 when the lines were dismantled and the area where the lines were was concreted over.

== Sources ==
- Butt, R. V. J. (October 1995). The Directory of Railway Stations: details every public and private passenger station, halt, platform and stopping place, past and present (1st ed.). Sparkford: Patrick Stephens Ltd. ISBN 978-1-85260-508-7. OCLC 60251199. OL 11956311M.
- A. Jowett (2000). Jowett's Nationalised Railway Atlas. Atlantic Publishing. ISBN 0-906899-99-0
- Leith stations and Edinburgh loop map

Preceding station	Disused railways	Following station
Waverley; Line closed, station open	North British Railway; Edinburgh Suburban Line	Piershill; Line disused, station closed
Waverley; Line closed, station open	North British Railway; Edinburgh, Leith and Granton Line	Easter Road; Line disused, station closed
Waverley; Line closed, station open	North British Railway; Leith Central Branch	Leith Central; Line and station closed
Waverley; Line closed, station open	British Rail; Leith Central Branch	Easter Road Park Halt; Matchday special trains only or Leith Central; Line and station closed
