= Portobello railway station =

Portobello railway station may refer to three former stations in Britain:

- Portobello railway station (Wolverhampton)
- Portobello railway station (E&DR), an Edinburgh and Dalkeith Railway station in Edinburgh
- Portobello railway station (NBR), a North British Railway station in Edinburgh
