= Joppa, Edinburgh =

Suburb of Edinburgh, Scotland

Coordinates: 55°56′51.52″N 3°5′40.52″W

Joppa
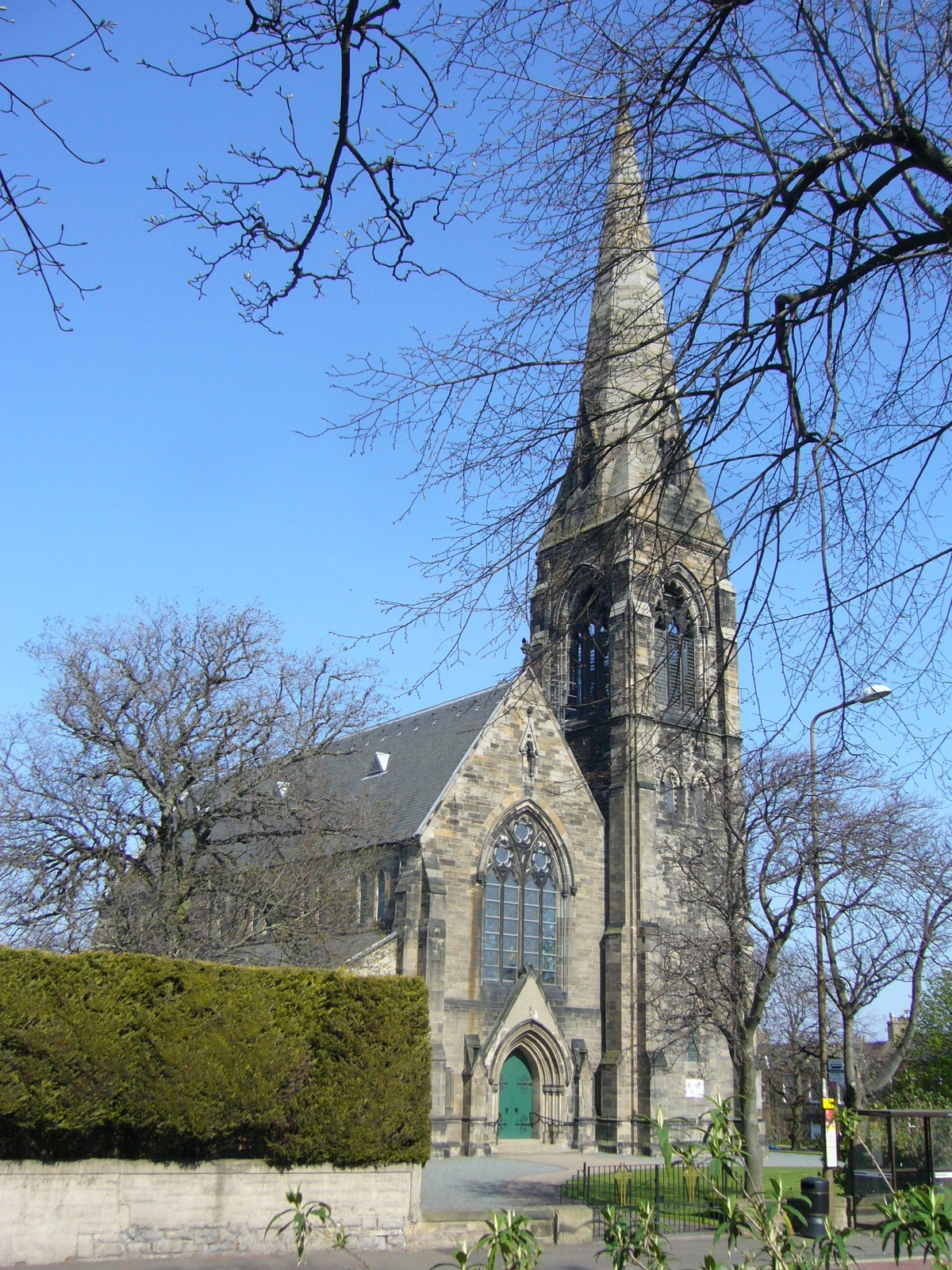
- Portobello and Joppa Parish Church

- Location within the City of Edinburgh council area Location within Scotland
- OS grid reference: NT319732
- Community council: Portobello
- Council area: City of Edinburgh
- Lieutenancy area: Edinburgh
- Country: Scotland
- Sovereign state: United Kingdom
- Post town: EDINBURGH
- Postcode district: EH15
- Dialling code: 0131
- Police: Scotland
- Fire: Scottish
- Ambulance: Scottish
- UK Parliament: Edinburgh East
- Scottish Parliament: Edinburgh Eastern

Joppa is an eastern suburb of Edinburgh, the capital of Scotland. It is bounded on the north by the coast of the Firth of Forth, on the west by Portobello of which it was a suburb when Portobello was a burgh, to the south by the open area south of Milton Road and to the east by Musselburgh in East Lothian. The name "Joppa" is of biblical origin, referring to the port of Jaffa in Israel, and was first bestowed on this part of Edinburgh in the 18th century (apparently because, like its namesake, it sits next to the sea).

Joppa is now largely residential, but salt was once produced from seawater by evaporation at Joppa Pans. Practically nothing remains of the industrial buildings but Rockville, formerly the owner's/manager's house and now a hotel and Rock Cottage. Some light industry has operated from the area near the former railway station in Brunstane Road and at Eastfield. Many of the larger houses near the seafront date from early nineteenth century, with extensive later areas further inland built up in the mid-twentieth century.

While the last cable cars were in use in Edinburgh, a line ran through to Joppa, where it connected with the Musselburgh electric tram line. The two lines joined in 1923 when the Edinburgh system was converted to electricity, and through trams then ran from Levenhall in Musselburgh to Waterloo Place in Edinburgh.

Joppa's skyline is dominated by the 165 ft spire of Portobello and Joppa Parish Church (formerly St Philip's Church), situated on the corner of Brunstane Road North. It is built from Binny Stone in the Early Decorated style by John Honeyman (1831–1914) and was completed in 1877. On 2 December 1998, a fire destroyed the roof and much of the interior. It has since been fully restored.

On 16 October 1939, the Luftwaffe made a daylight air raid up the Forth to bomb British warships (HMS Edinburgh, HMS Mohawk and HMS Southampton) at Rosyth. This was the first daylight air raid in the United Kingdom. Houses in Morton Street and Brunstane Road North were damaged as a result. The German pilots shot down during the raid were buried, following a ceremony at St Philip's Church, in Portobello Cemetery which lies on Milton Road East. They were the first enemy casualties of the Second World War to be buried on British soil.

The main attractions are now the Joppa Rocks, for their geological interest, and Portobello Beach on the seafront.

In 1789, Christopher Girtanner is noted as having a "salt manufactory" at Joppa Pans.
