= Jock's Lodge railway station =

Disused railway station in Jock's Lodge, Edinburgh

Coordinates: 55°57′24″N 3°08′48″W

Jock's Lodge

General information
- Location: Jock's Lodge, Edinburgh; Scotland

Other information
- Status: Disused

History
- Original company: North British Railway

Key dates
- September 1847: Opened
- 1 July 1848: Closed

Jock's Lodge railway station served the area of Jock's Lodge, Edinburgh, Scotland from 1847 to 1848 on the Waverley Route and the East Coast Main Line.

== History ==
This short lived station opened in September 1847 by the North British Railway. It was only open for 10 months, closing on 1 July 1848.

Preceding station	Historical railways	Following station
Edinburgh Waverley; Line and station open	North British Railway; Waverley Route	Niddrie; Line open, station closed
Edinburgh Waverley; Line and station open	North British Railway; East Coast Main Line	Portobello (NBR); Line open, station closed
