= Leith Central railway station =

Former railway station in Leith, Scotland

Coordinates: 55.9703°N 3.1716°W

Leith Central
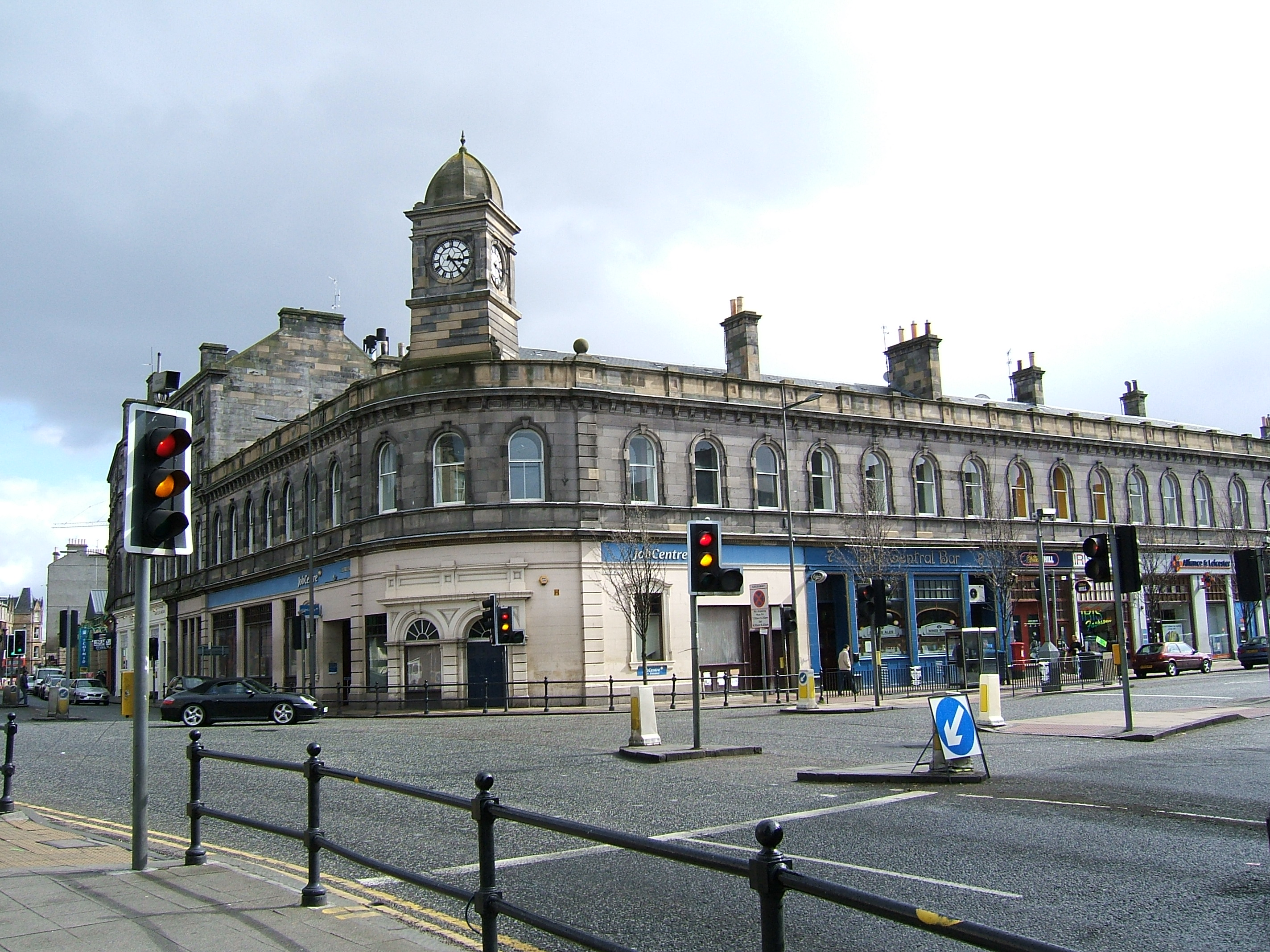
- Leith Central Station

General information
- Location: Leith, City of Edinburgh; Scotland
- Platforms: 4

Other information
- Status: Disused

History
- Original company: North British Railway
- Pre-grouping: North British Railway
- Post-grouping: London and North Eastern Railway

Key dates
- 1 July 1903: Opened
- 7 April 1952: Closed
- 1952: Reused as a DMU depot
- 1972: DMU depot closed
Location
- Location within the City of Edinburgh council area

Leith Central Railway Station was a railway station in Leith, Scotland. It formed the terminus of a North British Railway branch line from Edinburgh Waverley. The station was built on a large scale, and it included a trainshed over the platforms.

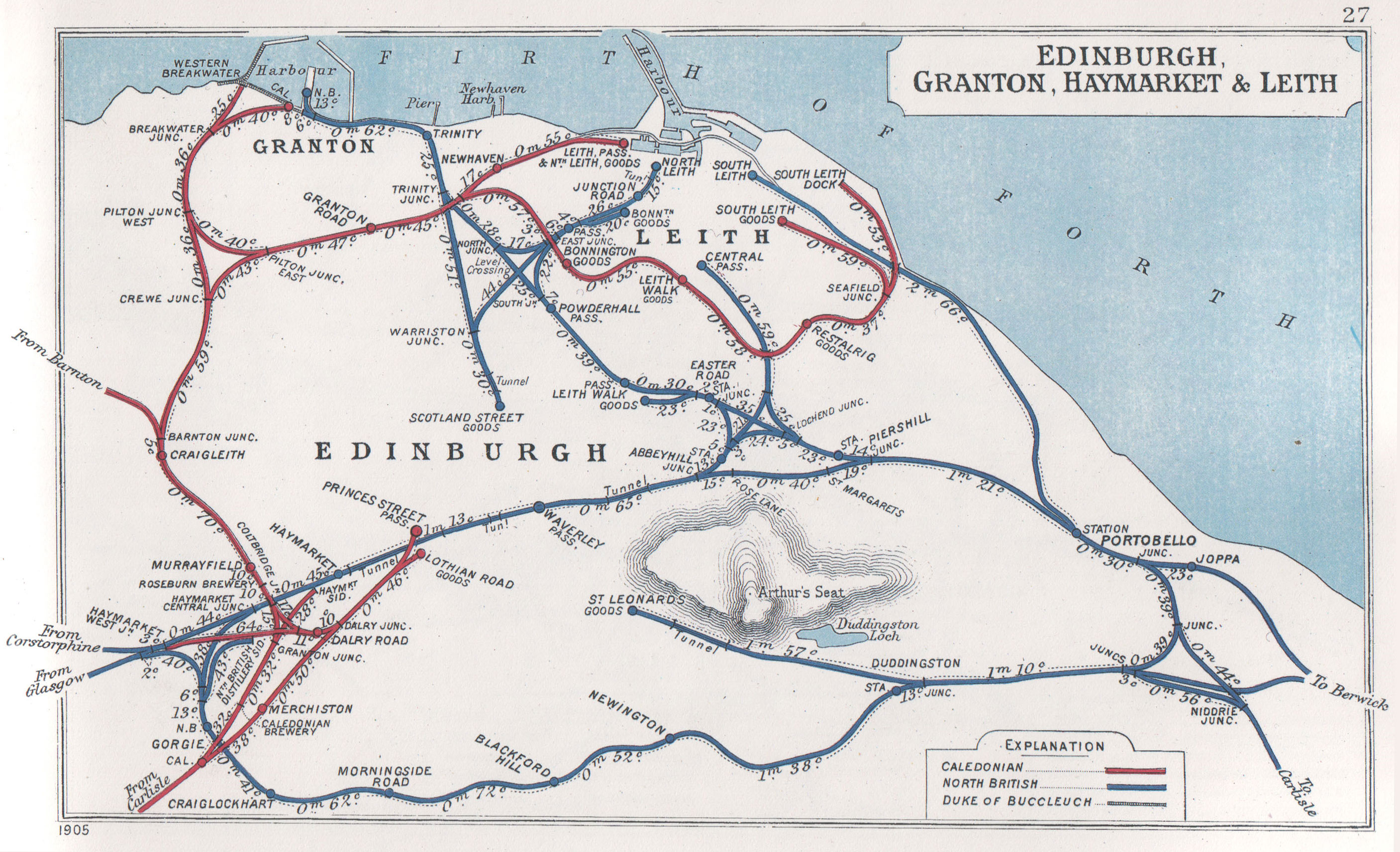
Map showing Edinburgh railways in 1905. Leith Central is situated directly below the placename "Leith".

Following the amalgamation of the county of city of Edinburgh and the Burgh of Leith in 1920, the two formerly separate tram systems were joined (including the conversion of Edinburgh's system from cable haulage to electricity). The improved services provided intense competition with the railway, affecting the viability of Leith Central station.

Until 1952 Leith Central had a regular passenger service to Edinburgh.

== Description of original station ==
The most striking feature of Leith Central Station was its size. The station occupied a whole town block at the foot of Leith Walk, being bounded by Leith Walk on the western side; Easter Road on the east and Duke Street to the north. The four platforms were positioned around fifteen feet above street level, with the buffer stops being at the western end. On this, the Leith Walk side, the station was entered by doors on the corner of Duke Street, leading to stairs up to the ticket office, waiting rooms and other passenger facilities, which were situated at platform level, one storey above the street. Below these consisted of series of retail premises on the Leith Walk and Duke Street sides of the Foot of the Walk, most notably the Central Bar, which still exists.

At the eastern side, the station was still as high above street level, however, the four platforms and many sidings contained within the station narrowed to cross Easter Road on a four-track bridge. Before crossing Easter Road, the train sheds finished just before the platform ends, around 45 yards (41 m) from Easter Road. Between the glass panelled gable end of the train shed and the Easter Road bridge was Leith Central signal box, controlling the approach to the station, most notably the three scissors crossings at the station mouth. Also provided at the Easter Road end of the station was an additional entrance. From almost underneath the Easter Road bridge, access was gained to the platforms by way of two stairways, meaning passengers did not have to make the long trip from the bottom of Easter Road to the foot of Leith Walk to catch their train.

The station is of similar scale to the Caledonian Railway's Princes Street railway station. It is generally believed that it was the threat of this railway company's ambitious plans to complete a circular route of North Edinburgh by building an extension to its existing Newhaven branch via Leith and an extensive tunnel under Calton Hill and George Street back to Princes Street Station which led to the construction of Leith Central. The size of the completed station was therefore a symbol of the might of the North British, and an indication to the Caledonian of its dominance in Leith.

== Reuse as a DMU depot ==
Following closure to passengers, the station was adapted to become a motive power depot (MPD) for the new Swindon-built Inter City Diesel multiple unit train sets used on express services (from 1956) between Edinburgh Waverley and Glasgow Queen Street. By the beginning of the 1970s the Inter City units were becoming unreliable and in May 1971 they were replaced by trains consisting of 6 coaches worked in top 'n tail mode by a pair of Class 27 locomotives. This change rendered Leith Central redundant as a depot. It was finally closed completely in 1972 and became derelict.

In the 1980s the derelict station was notorious as a haven for drug addicts, and this inspired a key scene in Trainspotting by Irvine Welsh. The character Begbie is in the station for that purpose, when from the shadows an alcoholic tramp jeers that he must be there for train-spotting. Begbie realises that the tramp is his father. The scene was not included in the film adaptation, but in its sequel.

The large train-shed was subsequently demolished and all that remains is the terminal building and clock tower.

== Remains ==
The site of the station platforms currently houses a children's soft-play centre, formerly Leith Waterworld, and a supermarket (Tesco Superstore). The main building which housed the station offices, waiting room etc., the station clock and the shops at street level all still stand at the foot of Leith Walk.

A tenement block on the opposite side of Easter Road which was demolished as part of the construction of the station has now been replaced by modern housing.

Preceding station	Disused railways	Following station
Abbeyhill; Line and station closed	North British Railway; Edinburgh, Leith and Granton Line; Leith Central Branch	Terminus
