= Georg Albert Girtanner =

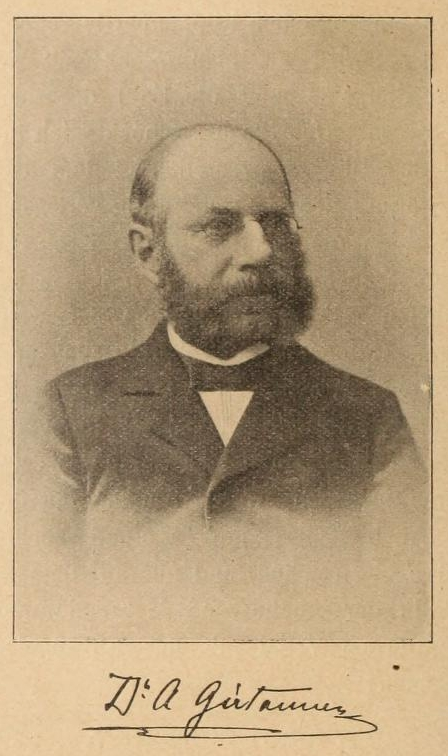

Georg Albert Girtanner (25 September 1839 – 4 June 1907) was a Swiss physician and ornithologist who also took a keen interest in the conservation of the Alpine Ibex which he helped reintroduce into Switzerland.

== Life and work ==
Girtanner was born in St. Gallen, son of physician Karl and Emma Auguste Vonwiller. The physician and professor Christopher Girtanner was a great uncle. After studying at the St. Gallen Gymnasium, he went to study medicine at Zurich (1857 — 1862) and returned to St. Gallen to practice from 1868. He began to study the montane fauna in his spare time and these included studies on the lammergeier, nutcracker, chough, snowfinch, alpine accentor, dipper, several species of grouse, and the wallcreeper. During travels across Europe, he visited museums and menageries. In 1862 he saw a pair of birds of paradise exhibited at the London zoo. He also obtained specimens for the Geneva museum, including a complete skeleton of an Irish elk from England. In 1906, along with hotelier Robert Mäder (1847-1936) and forester Emil Bächler (1868-1950), he set about reintroducing Alpine Ibex, purchasing young ones from poachers who got them from Aosta Valley for 800 Swiss Francs an animal. The money was provided by Mäder. The young were raised in the St. Gallen's Peter and Paul wildlife park founded by them. They grew up and more animals were added until they began to breed and in 1911, several were released into the wild in Graue Hörner. The 14000 ibex in Switzerland today are the offspring from here.

He married Süsette Reiser von Lichtensteig in 1872.
