= Piershill railway station =

Railway station in Edinburgh, Scotland

Piershill

General information
- Location: Portobello, Edinburgh, Edinburgh; Scotland
- Coordinates: 55.9569°N 3.1514°W
- Platforms: 2

Other information
- Status: Disused

History
- Original company: Edinburgh Suburban and Southside Junction Railway
- Pre-grouping: North British Railway
- Post-grouping: London and North Eastern Railway

Key dates
- 22 March 1868: Opened
- 1 January 1917: Closed
- 1 April 1919: Reopened
- 7 September 1964: Closed
Location

Piershill railway station was a railway station in Edinburgh, Scotland, on a loop off the main line. It was opened on 22 March 1868.

Piershill station closed in 1964, when passenger rail services were withdrawn from the Musselburgh branch rail service as part of the British Railways rationalisation programme known as the Beeching Axe, although the line itself was retained for rail freight use. The route was used for infrequent movement of waste from Powderhall to the East Coast Main Line until 2016.

Piershill was near the temporary Meadowbank Stadium station which was opened during the Commonwealth Games in Edinburgh in 1986; Meadowbank station closed shortly after the games finished.

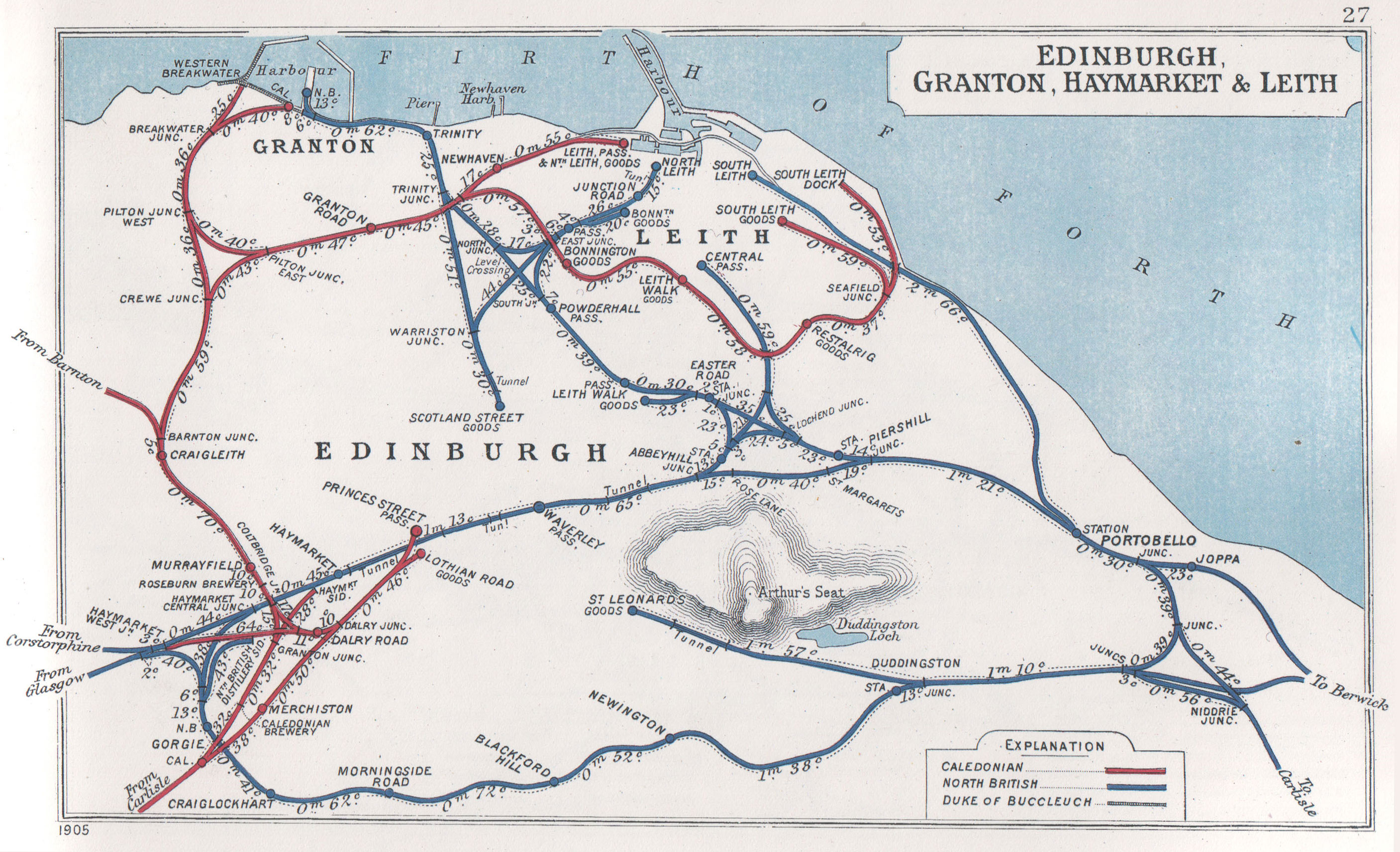
A 1905 Railway Clearing House diagram of Edinburgh railways, with the SSJR (in blue along the bottom)

== Sources ==
- Butt, R. V. J. (October 1995). The Directory of Railway Stations: details every public and private passenger station, halt, platform and stopping place, past and present (1st ed.). Sparkford: Patrick Stephens Ltd. ISBN 978-1-85260-508-7. OCLC 60251199. OL 11956311M.

Preceding station	Disused railways	Following station
Abbeyhill; Line partially extant but disused, station closed	North British Railway; Edinburgh Suburban Line	Portobello; Line extant but partially disused, station closed
