= Battle of Porto Bello =

Battle of Porto Bello may refer to the following, at or near Portobelo, Panama:

- Capture of Portobello (1601), an engagement of the Anglo-Spanish War (1585–1604)
- Henry Morgan's raid on Porto Bello (1668), by Welsh privateer Henry Morgan
- Assault on Porto Bello (1680), by buccaneer John Coxon
- Attack on Porto Bello (1702), was an engagement of the War of the Spanish Succession
- Blockade of Porto Bello (1726–1728), an engagement of the Anglo-Spanish War (1727–1729)
- Battle of Porto Bello (1739), an engagement of the War of Jenkins' Ear
- Porto Bello Fiasco (1742), an expedition of the War of Jenkins' Ear
- Bombardment of Porto Bello (1744), an action of the War of Jenkins' Ear
- Attack on Porto Bello (1814), an engagement of the Spanish American wars of independence
- Attack on Porto Bello (1819), an engagement of the Spanish American wars of independence
