= South Leith railway station =

Disused railway station in Leith, Edinburgh

South Leith

General information
- Location: Leith, Edinburgh; Scotland
- Coordinates: 55.9765°N 3.1654°W
- Grid reference: NT273765
- Platforms: 2

Other information
- Status: Disused

History
- Original company: Edinburgh and Dalkeith Railway
- Pre-grouping: North British Railway

Key dates
- July 1832: Opened as Leith
- 1846: Closed to passengers
- 1 October 1859: Reopened as South Leith
- 1 July 1903: Closed
Location

South Leith railway station served the area of Leith, Edinburgh, Scotland from 1832 to 1903 on the Edinburgh and Dalkeith Railway.

== History ==
The station opened in 1832 by the Edinburgh and Dalkeith Railway as Leith station. The station closed in 1846 but reopened on 1 October 1859 and was renamed South Leith on the same day. It closed again to passengers and goods traffic on 1 July 1903.

Preceding station	Disused railways	Following station
Terminus	Edinburgh and Dalkeith Railway	Portobello (E&DR); Line and station closed
