= Joppa railway station =

Closed railway station in City of Edinburgh, Scotland

Joppa
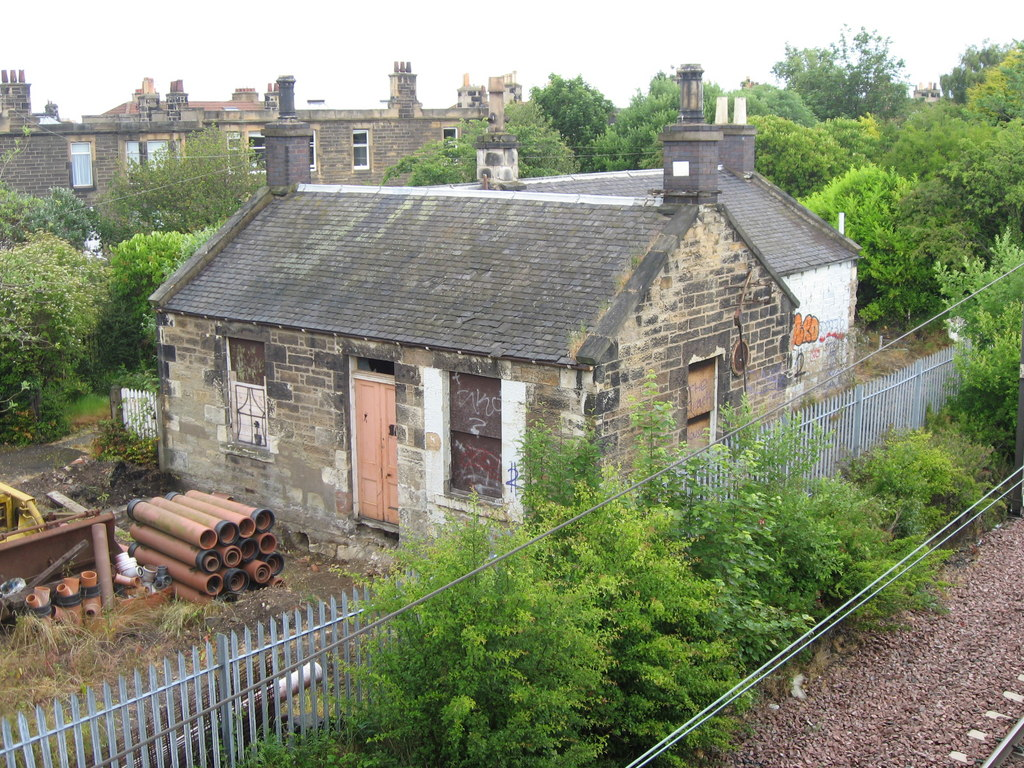
- Remains of the former Joppa station building.

General information
- Location: Joppa, Edinburgh; Scotland
- Coordinates: 55.9472°N 3.1016°W
- Grid reference: NT313732
- Platforms: 2

Other information
- Status: Disused

History
- Original company: North British Railway
- Pre-grouping: North British Railway
- Post-grouping: London and North Eastern Railway

Key dates
- 16 May 1859: Opened
- 7 September 1964: Closed
Location

Joppa railway station served the suburb of Joppa, Edinburgh, Scotland from 1859 to 1964 on the East Coast Main Line.

== History ==
The station opened on 16 May 1859 by the North British Railway. The station was closed to both passengers and goods traffic on 7 September 1964. The station building remains, however the platforms have been removed.

Preceding station	Historical railways	Following station
Portobello (NBR); Line open, station closed	North British Railway; East Coast Main Line	Newhailes; Line open, station closed
