= Easter Road Park Halt railway station =

Former railway station in Scotland

Easter Road Park Halt

General information
- Location: Lochend, Edinburgh; Scotland
- Coordinates: 55.962386°N 3.162239°W
- Platforms: 1

Other information
- Status: Disused

History
- Original company: British Railways

Key dates
- 8 April 1950: Station opened
- 6 July 1967: Station closed
Location

Easter Road Park Halt railway station was a railway station located in Lochend, Edinburgh, Scotland from 1950 to 1967 on the Leith Central Branch. It was built to serve the nearby Easter Road stadium.

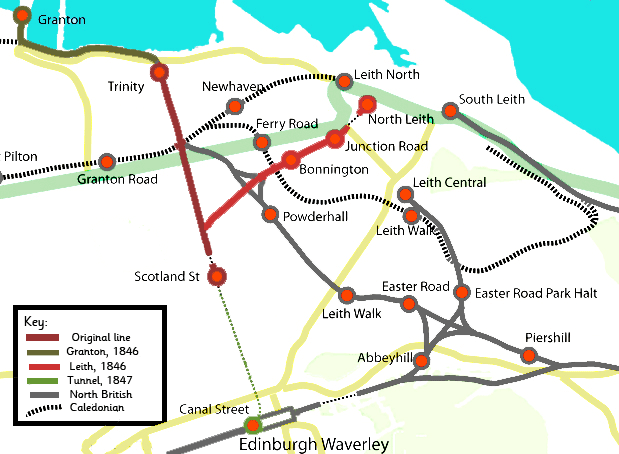
Map of railways in Leith, showing the location of Easter Road Park Halt station

== History ==
This short-lived station was opened in 1950 by British Railways. It consisted of one wooden platform and was solely open on match days for arrivals only. Fans would have to make their return journey after the match from neighbouring stations in Leith, Abbeyhill or at Waverley.

Preceding station	Disused railways	Following station
Abbeyhill; Line and station closed	British Rail; Leith Central Branch	Terminus
