= Christopher Girtanner =

Swiss author, physician and chemist (1760–1800)

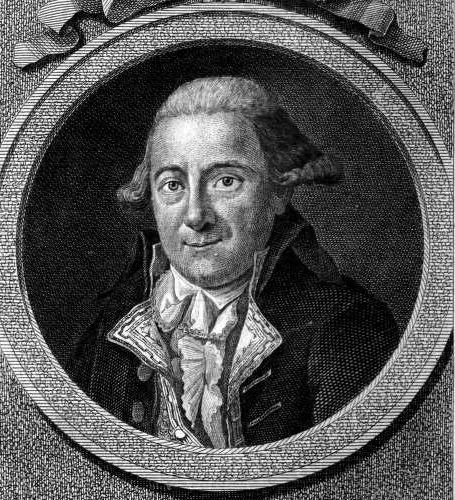
Portrait Christoph Girtanner 1792

Prof Christopher Girtanner FRSE (1760–1800) was a short-lived but influential Swiss author, physician and chemist. He was also Privy Councillor to the Duke of Saxe-Coburg.

== Life ==
He was born in St. Gallen in Switzerland on 7 December 1760, the son of Hieronymus Girtanner, a banker and his wife, Barbara Felicitas. He studied variously at St. Gallen, Lausanne, Paris, Edinburgh and London. He received his doctorate (MD) from the University of Göttingen in 1782.

He spent some years in the United Kingdom, and apparently owned a "salt manufactory near Edinburgh" (presumably at Joppa) in 1789. In 1790, he was elected a Fellow of the Royal Society of Edinburgh. His proposers were Daniel Rutherford, Andrew Duncan and John Playfair.

In 1796, he analysed the appearance of syphilis into Europe in the late-fifteenth century. The ongoing debate of his day was as to whether the disease appeared spontaneously in Europe or was brought by the discovery of the Americas.

He died in Göttingen, in what is now part of modern-day Germany on 17 May 1800.

== Family ==
In 1790 he married Catherina Maria Erdmann.

== Publications ==
- Historical Information and Political Remarks concerning the French Revolution, 7 volumes (1792–94)
- The Antiquity of Syphilis (1796)
- Observations on the Nature and Cure of Calculus, Sea Scurvy etc. (1797)
