= Portobello railway station (E&DR) =

Railway station in City of Edinburgh, Scotland

Portobello

General information
- Location: Portobello, City of Edinburgh; Scotland
- Coordinates: 55.949°N 3.118°W
- Grid reference: NT302734
- Platforms: 2

Other information
- Status: Disused

History
- Original company: Edinburgh and Dalkeith Railway

Key dates
- July 1832: Opened
- 1846: Closed
Location
- Location within the City of Edinburgh council area

The Edinburgh and Dalkeith Railway opened Portobello railway station in July 1832. It remained in use until 1846 when a replacement station was opened nearby on the NBR Main Line.

== History ==
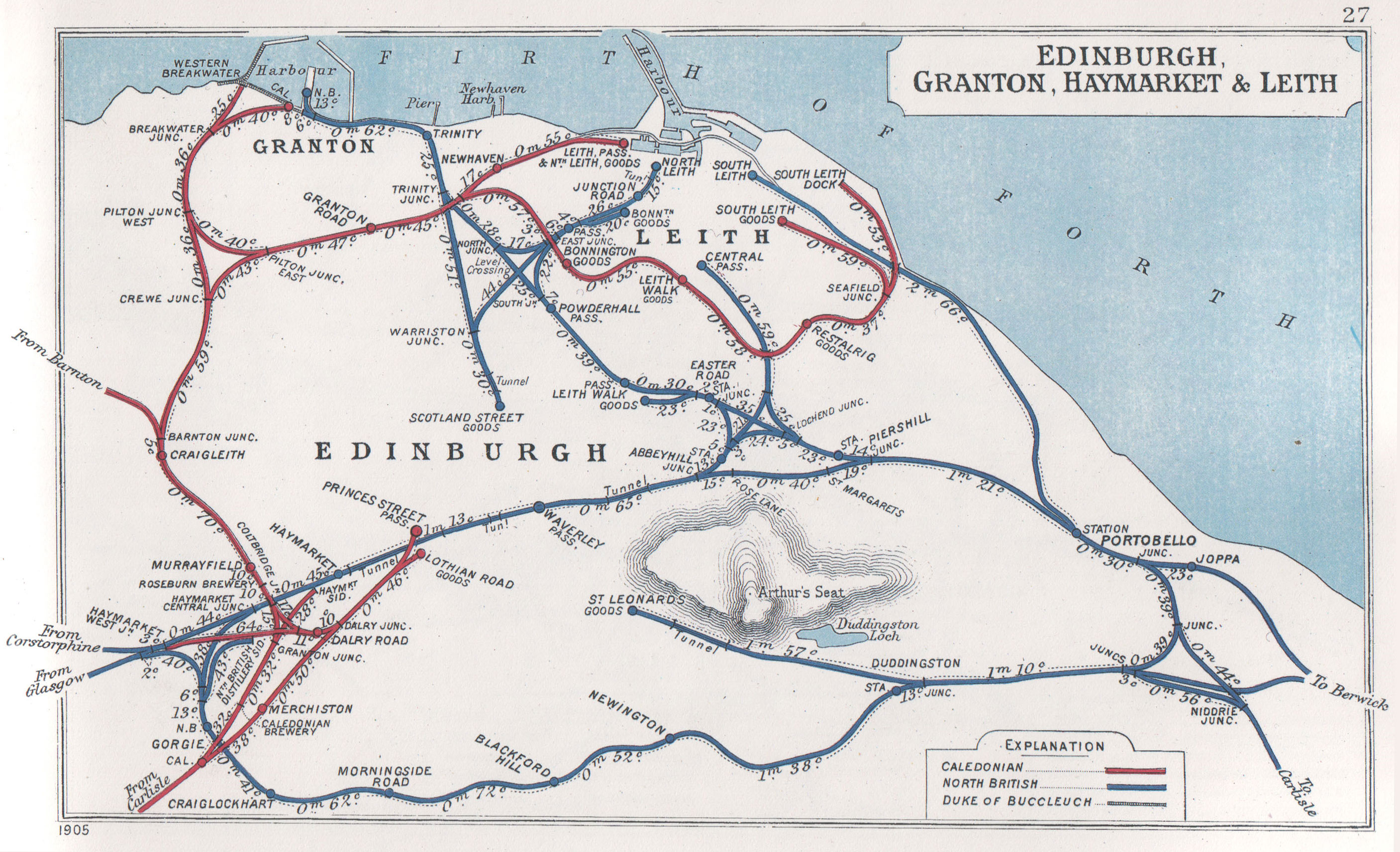
A 1905 Railway Clearing House diagram of Edinburgh railways, with the SSJR (in blue along the bottom)

Preceding station	Historical railways	Following station
South Leith	Edinburgh and Dalkeith Railway; North British Railway	Joppa (E&DR)
