= Easter Road (street) =

Main road in Edinburgh

Coordinates: 55°57′44″N 3°10′16″W

Easter Road is an arterial road in north Edinburgh, the capital of Scotland. The road is so called as it was known as the "Easter (eastern) road to Leith". As maps of Edinburgh in the late 18th century show, it had a counterpart in "Wester Road" (now Broughton Road and Bonnington Road). Until the creation of Leith Walk in the middle of the 17th century these were the two main routes from Leith to Edinburgh. Historic personages who have ridden up Easter Road have included Mary, Queen of Scots (1561) and Oliver Cromwell (from Leith Links in 1650).

== History ==
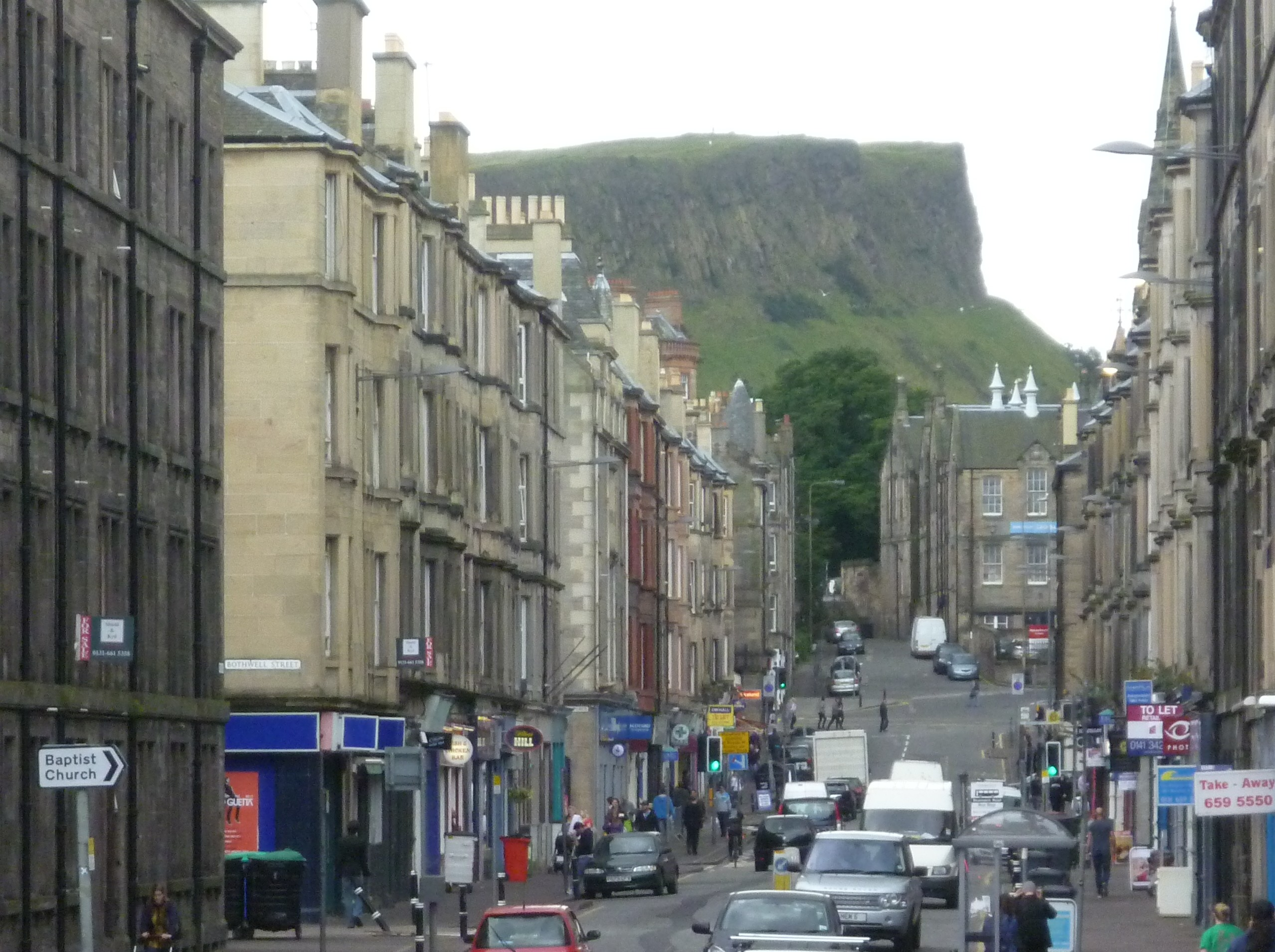
Looking south up Easter Road, towards Salisbury Crags.

According to Robert Chambers, writing in 1824, Leith Walk, as its name suggests, was a gravel-surfaced footway, only opened to wheeled traffic after the completion of North Bridge in 1772. Before that Easter Road had been the route taken by coaches running between Edinburgh and Leith. The Edinburgh article in the Statistical Account of Scotland (1791–99) contains evidence from the publisher William Creech that coach traffic between Edinburgh and Leith increased from hourly to half-hourly between 1763 and 1783.

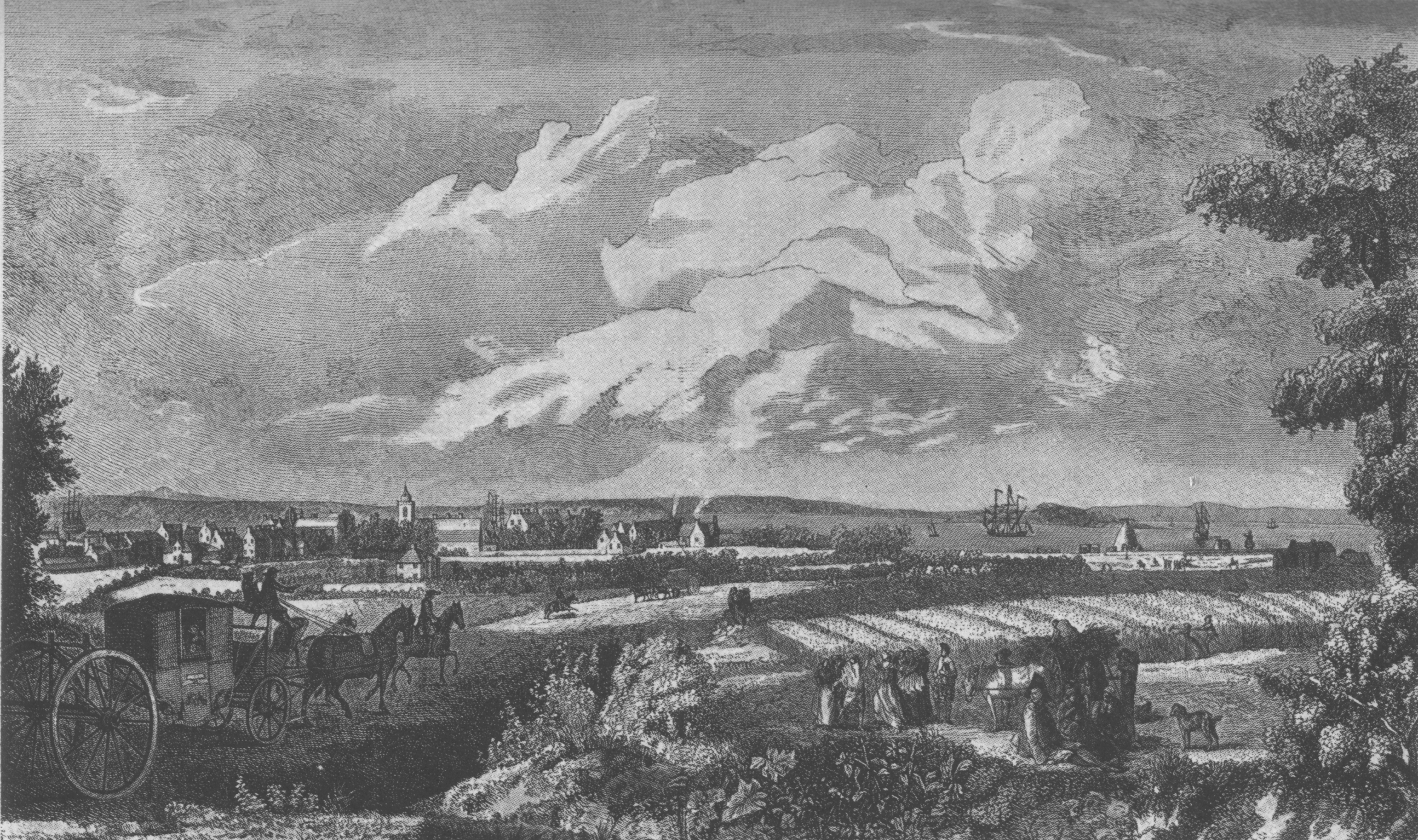
Easter Road in the 18th century

Most of the area comprises tenement housing built for the artisan and working classes in the second half of the 19th century on mainly nursery ground feued on the south-eastern side by Baron Norton's Estate, (formerly belonging to the Logans of Restalrig), on the south-western side by the George Heriot's Trust and further north, on both sides of the road, Trinity Hospital. These tenements remain almost wholly intact, except at the northern, Leith end of the road where streets between Thorntree Street and Leith Central railway station were subject to slum clearance in the 1970s and replaced with new housing. The station has since been demolished and replaced by a supermarket and a leisure centre. New housing has also appeared since the 1970s in several locations on and just off Easter Road, for example opposite Thorntree Street, in Albion Road and in Brunswick Road. About a third of the road at the southern, London Road, end is the older retail area, comprising residential tenements with, at ground-floor level, small shops typical of a high street. There are a few corner shops and public houses on the northern two-thirds of the road particularly at the junction with Lorne Street. The southward view along the road focuses upon Salisbury Crags. Easter Road was the last major road in Scotland to be paved with granite setts replacing tarmac in 1955. After a fatality on the road in the late 1990s the road was re-tarmacked, saving the costly expense of maintaining the setts.

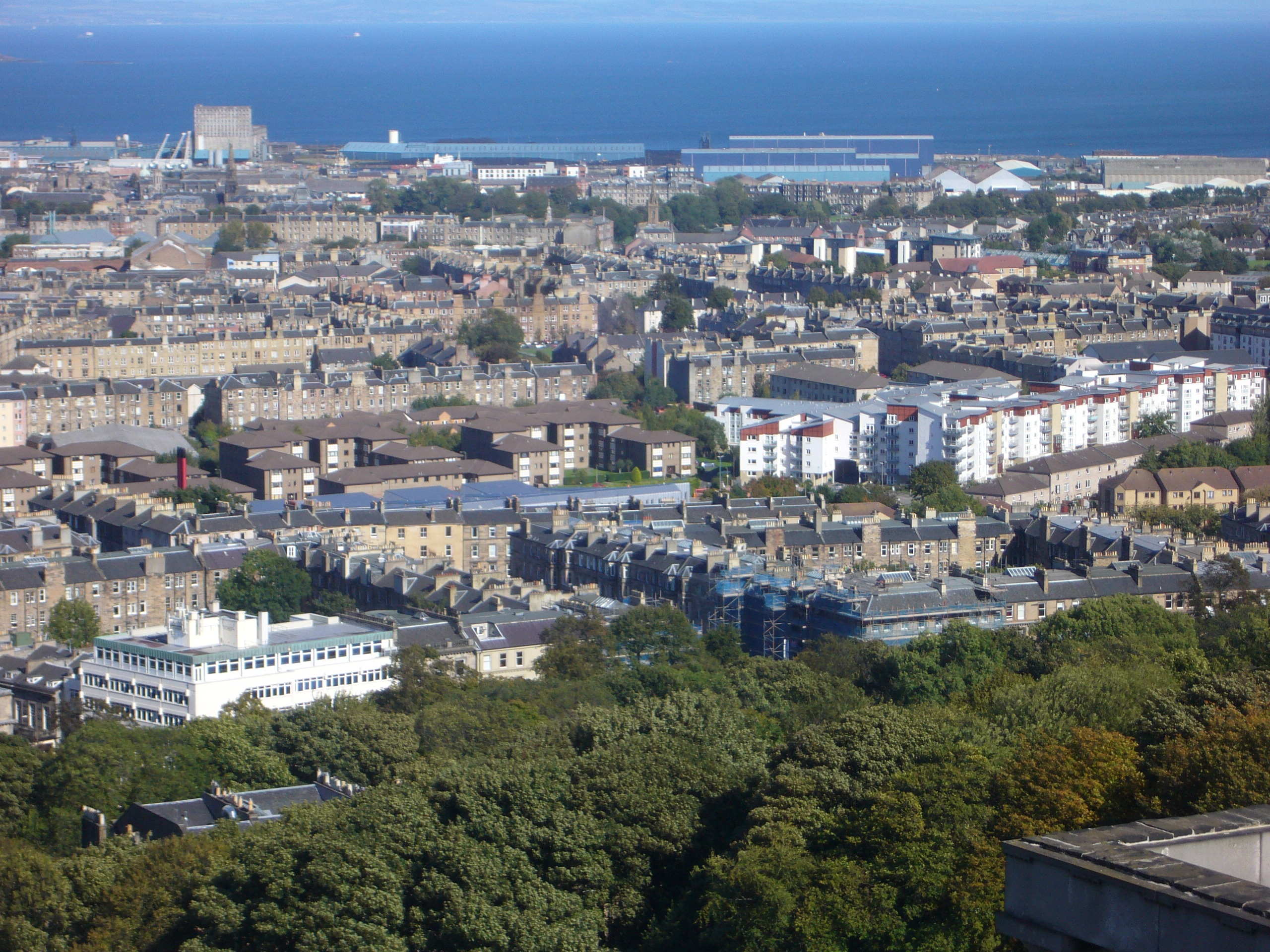
The area between Easter Road and Leith Walk in 2009.

=== Modern day ===
The area between Easter Road and Leith Walk to the west has long been Edinburgh's most densely populated area. The comparatively lower cost of housing in this part of the city makes the area relatively attractive for buying a house or renting accommodation. It has a high proportion of immigrants, including young Asians and Spanish people.

== Buildings of Interest ==
- The Drambuie Factory and offices stood at the foot of Easter Road from 1955 to 1985. It was demolished and replaced by housing.
- Bothwell House (on the corner of Bothwell Street) dates from 1893 and is a very early example of a building made from artificial stone.

== See also ==
- The Singing Street
