= Edinburgh Waverley railway station =

Principal railway station in Edinburgh, Scotland

Edinburgh Waverley Waverley Dhùn Èideann
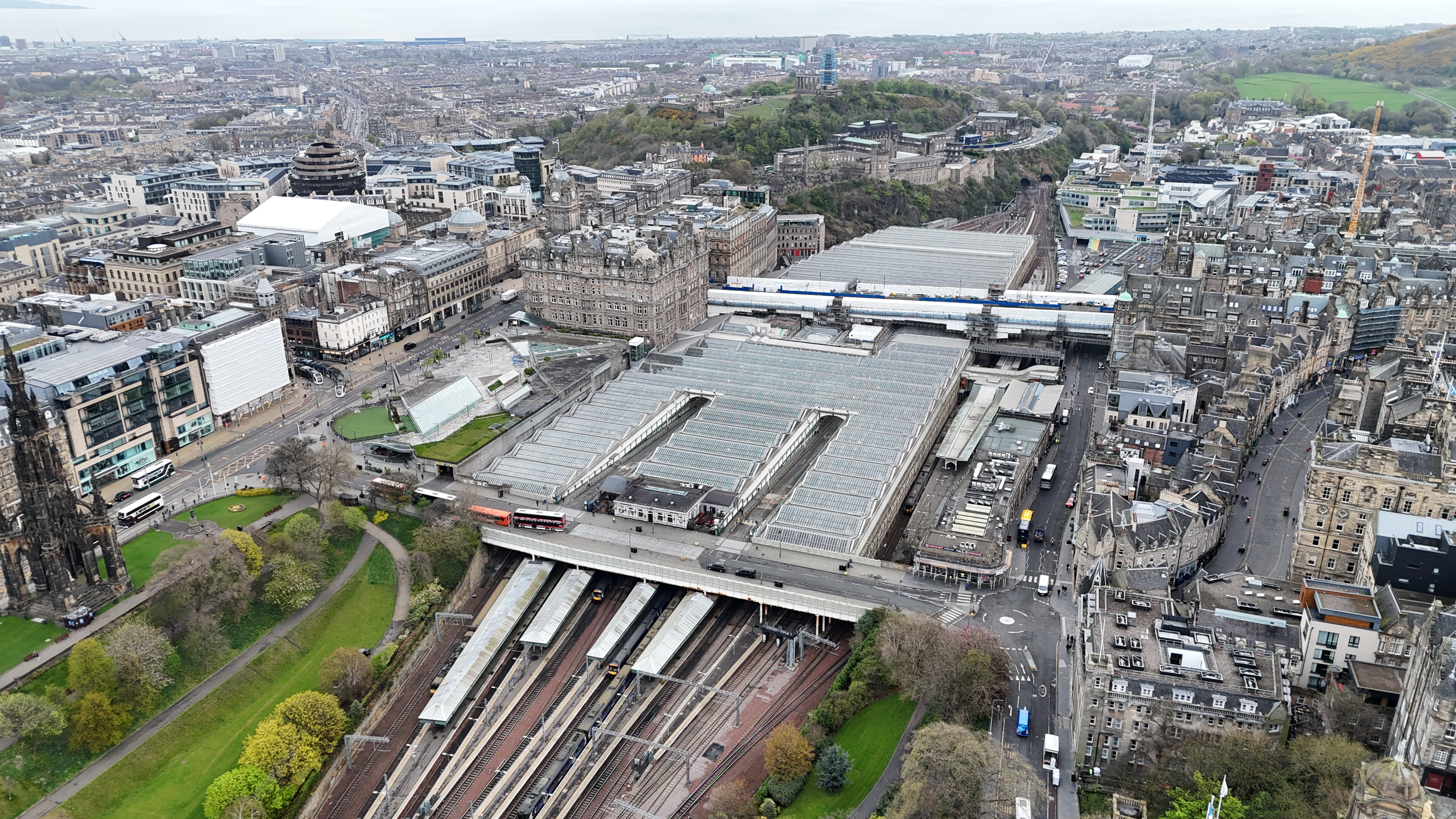
- Aerial view of Edinburgh Waverley, looking east

General information
- Location: Edinburgh, Scotland
- Coordinates: 55.9521°N 3.1893°W
- Grid reference: NT257737
- Owner: Network Rail
- Platforms: 20

Other information
- Station code: EDB
- IATA code: ZXE
- Classification: DfT category A
- Website: www.networkrail.co.uk/communities/passengers/our-stations/edinburgh-waverley/

History
- Original company: Edinburgh, Leith and Newhaven Railway; Edinburgh and Glasgow Railway; North British Railway

Key dates
- 22 June 1846: North Bridge built by NBR
- 17 May 1847: General Station built by E&GR
- 17 May 1847: Canal Street built by EL&NR
- April 1866: NBR demolished existing stations; replaced with Edinburgh Waverley
- 18 April 1966: Renamed Edinburgh
- ?: Renamed Edinburgh Waverley

Passengers
- 2020/21: ▼2.958 million
- Interchange: ▼0.203 million
- 2021/22: ▲13.618 million
- Interchange: ▲0.860 million
- 2022/23: ▲18.213 million
- Interchange: ▲1.237 million
- 2023/24: ▲21.308 million
- Interchange: ▲1.466 million
- 2024/25: ▲22.755 million
- Interchange: ▲1.583 million

Listed Building – Category A
- Feature: Railway station
- Designated: 12 November 1991
- Reference no.: LB30270
Location
Notes
- Passenger statistics from the Office of Rail and Road. Station usage figures saw a large decrease in 2020/21 due to the COVID-19 pandemic

Edinburgh Waverley (also known simply as Edinburgh; Scottish Gaelic: Waverley Dhùn Èideann) is the principal railway station serving Edinburgh, Scotland. It is the second-busiest station in Scotland, after Glasgow Central. The station serves as the northern terminus of the East Coast Main Line, 393 miles 13 chains (393.16 miles; 632.7 kilometres) from London King's Cross, although some trains operated by London North Eastern Railway continue to other Scottish destinations beyond Edinburgh.

== History ==
=== Origins ===
Edinburgh's Old Town, perched on a steep-sided sloping ridge, was bounded on the north by a valley in which the Nor Loch had been formed. In the 1750s overcrowding led to proposals to link across this valley to allow development to the north. The "noxious lake" was to be narrowed into "a canal of running water", with a bridge formed across the east end of the loch adjacent to the physic garden. This link was built from 1766 as the North Bridge and at the same time plans for the New Town began development to the north, with Princes Street to get unobstructed views south over sloping gardens and the proposed canal. The loch was drained as work on the bridge proceeded.

In 1770, a coachbuilder began work on properties feued at the corner between the bridge and Princes Street, and feuers on the other side of the street strongly objected to this construction blocking their views to the south. A series of court cases ended with the decision that the buildings nearing completion could stay, immediately to the west of that some workshops would be allowed below the level of Princes Street, and further west a park would be "kept and preserved in perpetuity as pleasure ground" in what became Princes Street Gardens.

=== Edinburgh and Glasgow railway ===
In the mid-1830s, proposals for a railway from Glasgow running along the gardens to a station at the North Bridge were set out in a prospectus with assurances that the trains would be concealed from view, and smoke from them "would scarcely be seen". An association of "Princes Street Proprietors" who had feued houses in the street, and had spent large sums turning the "filthy and offensive bog" of the Nor Loch into quiet gardens, strongly opposed the railway and in late 1836 put forward their case against the parliamentary bill for the railway.

The Edinburgh and Glasgow Railway opened in 1842 with its terminus at Haymarket railway station, stopping short of Princes Street. In the Railway Mania of the 1840s, the railway sought another act of Parliament allowing access along the gardens, and at the same time two other railways proposed terminus stations at the North Bridge site. By then several of the Princes Street properties were shops or hotels with an interest in development, and agreement was reached in 1844 on walls and embankments to conceal the Edinburgh and Glasgow railway line in a cutting, with compensation of almost £2,000 for the proprietors.

=== North Bridge Station ===
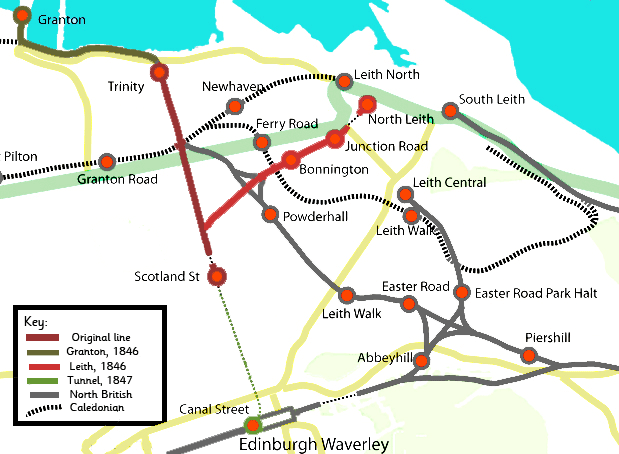
Location of Waverley and (former) lines emanating from the station

The North Bridge station was opened on 22 June 1846 by the North British Railway, as the terminus for its line from Berwick-upon-Tweed. The Edinburgh and Glasgow Railway's General station opened on 17 May 1847, on the same day as the Canal Street station of the Edinburgh, Leith and Newhaven Railway, serving Leith and Granton via a long rope-hauled tunnel under the New Town. The collective name "Waverley", after the Waverley Novels by Sir Walter Scott, was used for the three from around 1854 when the through "Waverley" route to Carlisle opened. Canal Street station was also known as Edinburgh Princes Street, not to be confused with the Caledonian Railway railway station later built at the West End which was named Princes Street station from 1870.

From 1866 to 1868, the North British Railway acquired the stations of its rivals, demolished all three and closed the Scotland Street tunnel to Canal Street. The present Victorian station was built on the site. Along the tracks of this first station, Hanna, Donald & Wilson built some very impressive roofs. The station was extended in the late 19th century. In 1897, the impressive glass dome was added. Waverley has been in continual use since, under the auspices of the North British, the LNER, British Railways (rebranded as British Rail after 1965), Railtrack and now Network Rail. From its opening in its current form by the eastward tunnelled extension from Haymarket, Waverley has been the principal railway station in Edinburgh. From 1870 to 1965, the city had a second major station, Princes Street, operated by the rival Caledonian Railway, but this was never as important as Waverley.

The railway company constructed a hotel beside their station. The North British Hotel, adjacent to the station at the corner between Princes Street and North Bridge, on the site of the coachworks, opened in 1902. It closed in 1988, but was re-opened by new owners as the Balmoral Hotel in 1991.

=== Recent history ===
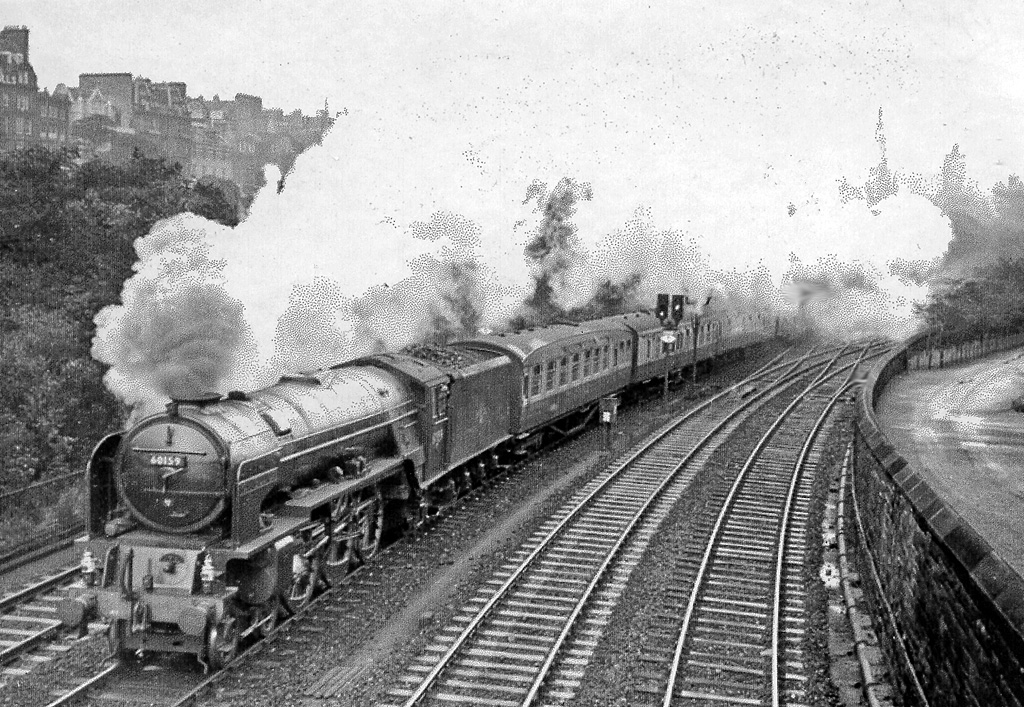
Aberdeen express leaving Edinburgh Waverley in 1957

British Rail brought railway electrification in 1991 with electric trains on the East Coast Main Line to Glasgow Central and via York to London King's Cross. The station's large size and the unusual topography of its surroundings mean that it contains a large amount of valuable, centrally located land.

In June 1995, Railtrack, the then owners of the station, announced the redevelopment of the station, saying that it would be underway by the year 2000. The Railtrack (Waverleyy Station) Order Confirmation Act 2000 (c. vi), an act of the Parliament of the United Kingdom, was promoted by Railtrack, to enable the redevelopment of the station by amending various laws imposed on the station since it was opened. The committee of parliamentary commissioners which approved the bill was chaired by Eric Clarke.

During 2006 and 2007, parts of Waverley were extensively refurbished, including two new through platforms and the electrification of platforms 12 to 18 in preparation for electric trains from the Airdrie-Bathgate rail link and future lines in Scotland to be electrified by the EGIP (Edinburgh/Glasgow Improvement Project).

From 2010 to 2012, the glazing of the roof of Waverley station was entirely replaced with new strengthened clear glass panels, replacing the old 34,000 m^{2} (370,000 sq ft) of mixed surfaces including felt, cloudy wired glass and plastic sheet. Part of a £130 million upgrade, this has greatly increased the amount of natural light in the station.

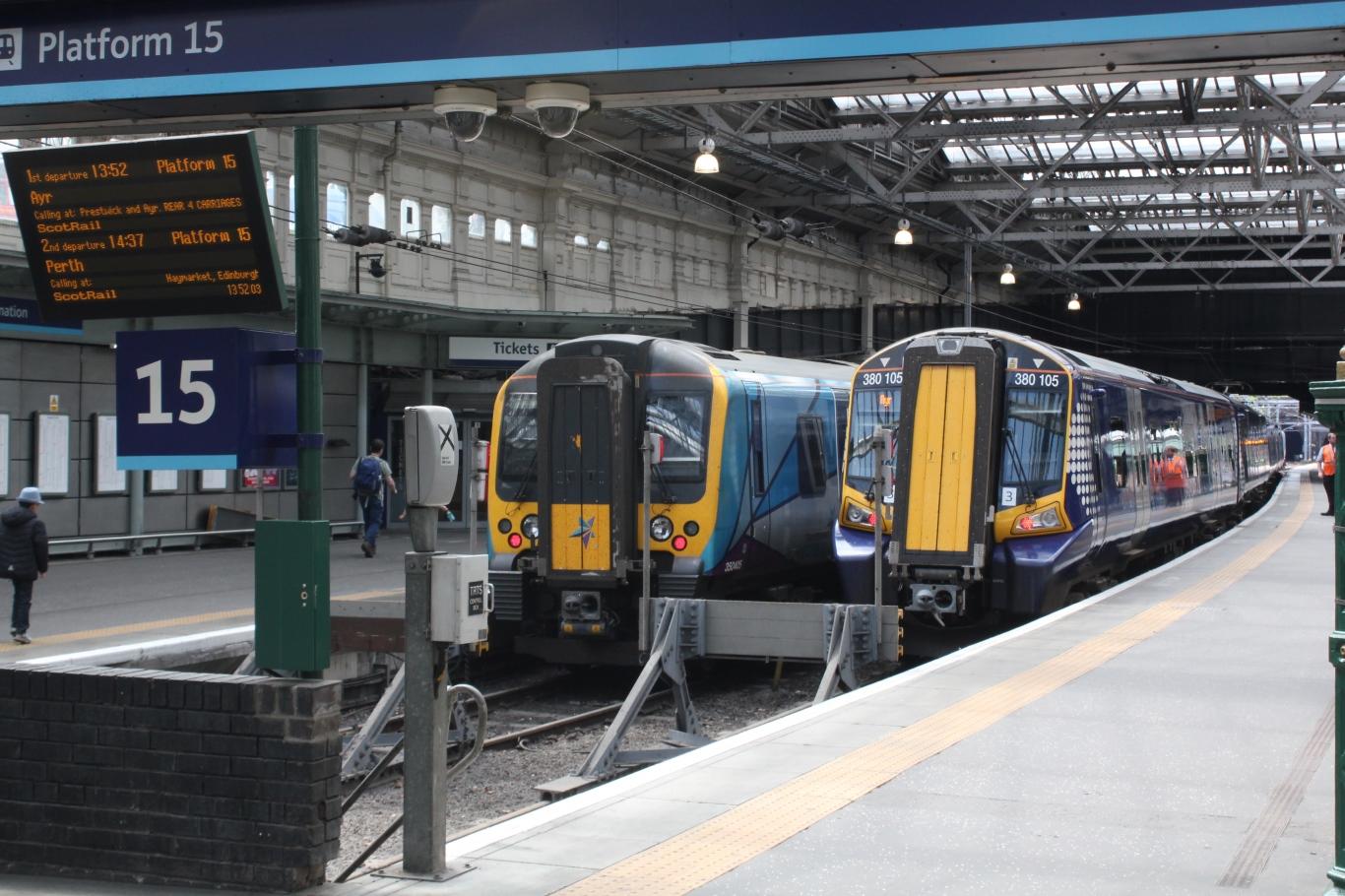
Platform 15 at the station, 2018

From 2012 to 2014, improvements included: a new set of covered escalators at Waverley Steps leading to Princes Street (narrowing the huge set of previously open-air steps); a rebuilt and widened entrance from Market Street; a rebuilding of the canopies on the southern suburban line; a restoration of the central space in the ticket hall; and major improvements to the Calton Road access. Internally, several new lifts and escalators have greatly aided circulation. A new drop-off point and disabled parking/access was added on the Calton Road access in 2014.

In mid-2017, as part of the Edinburgh to Glasgow Improvement Programme, platform 12 was extended. At the same time the former Motorail bay platforms were extended into a former car park area and taxi rank to allow platforms 5 and 6 to be extended to accommodate additional London North Eastern Railway services. Platforms 5 and 6 were brought into use on 28 February 2019.

Work began in 2020 to reopen a corridor from the ticket office to the eastern concourse; this will also see the toilets replaced and a Changing Places facility installed.

== Location ==
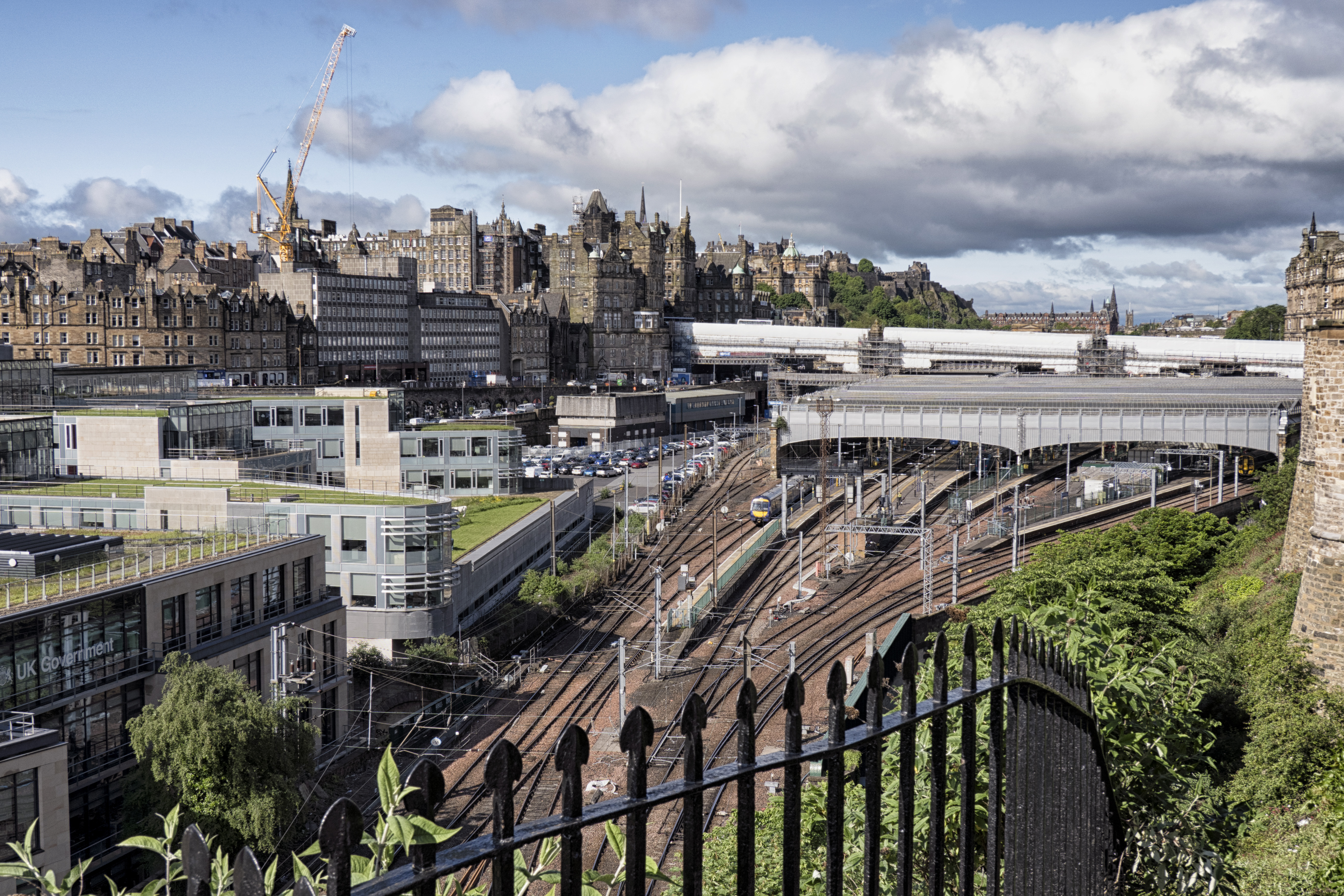
View of the station from Calton Hill

Waverley station is situated in a steep, narrow valley between the medieval Old Town and the 18th century New Town. Princes Street, the premier shopping street, runs close to its north side. The valley is bridged by the North Bridge, rebuilt in 1897 as a three-span iron and steel bridge, on huge sandstone piers. This passes high above the station's central section, with the greater half of the station being west of North Bridge.

The central booking hall is just west of the northern massive stone pier of the bridge and cleverly hides it within its bulk. Waverley Bridge lies at the western end of the station (though platforms extend below it) and it is this road which, by means of ramps, formerly afforded vehicular access to the station and still provides two of the six pedestrian entrances to the station.

The valley to the west of the station, formerly the site of the Nor Loch, is the public parkland of Princes Street Gardens. Directly east of the station are St Andrew's House, which accommodates part of the Scottish Government and Governor's House.

== Services ==
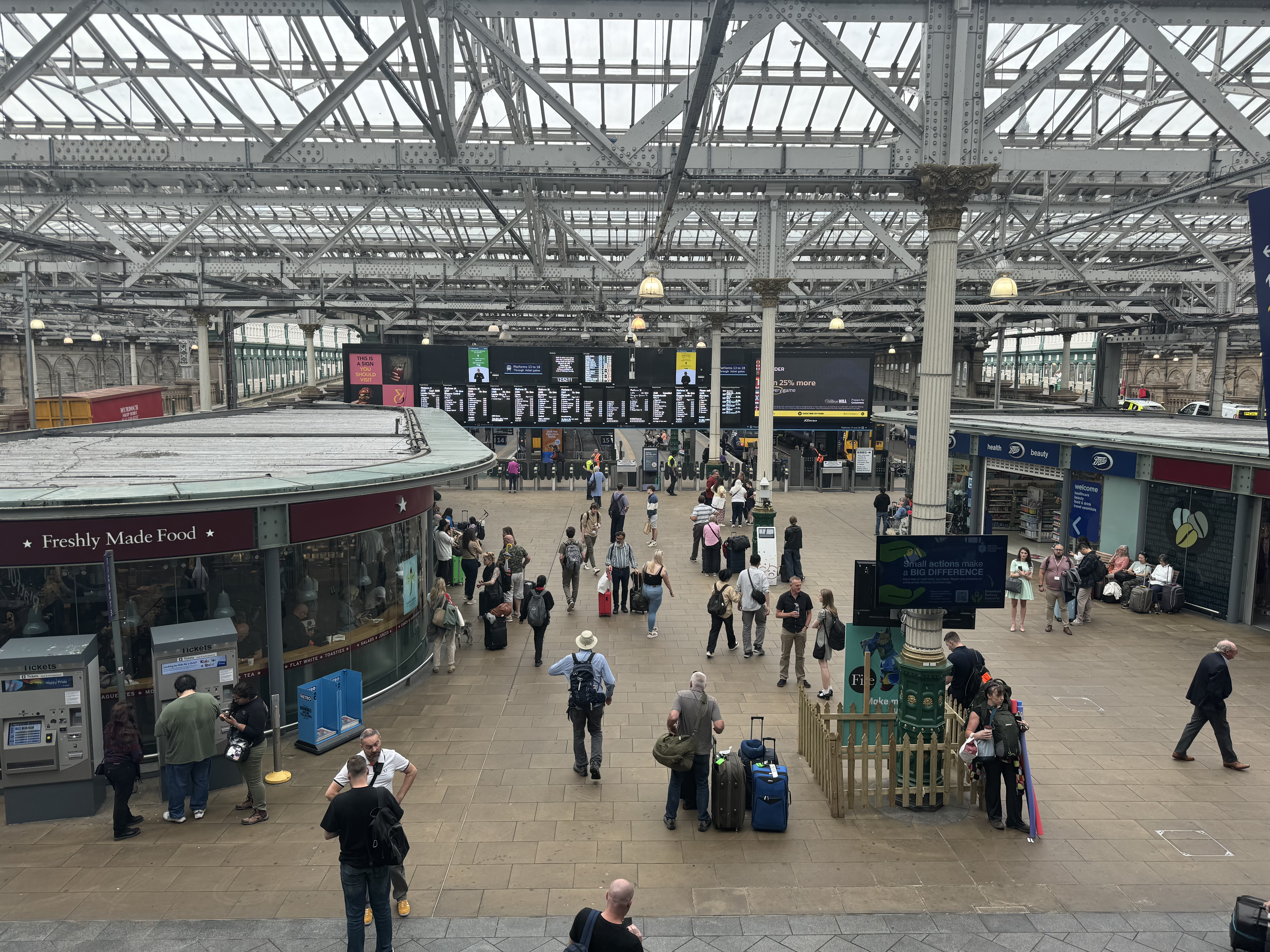
The station concourse

Several train operating companies serve the station, which (as of 2025) is the second-busiest in Scotland, after Glasgow Central. The typical off-peak service in trains per hour (tph) and trains per day (tpd), as of the May 2025 timetable change, is as follows:

London North Eastern Railway

- 1 tph to London King's Cross (fast), via Newcastle and York
- 1 tph to London King's Cross (semi-fast), via Newcastle, Durham, York and Newark Northgate
- 1 tpd to Leeds, via Newcastle and York
- 4 tpd to Aberdeen, via Dundee
- 1 tpd to Inverness, via Stirling, Perth and Aviemore.

The services, as of the December 2025 timetable change, are as follows:

- 1 tph to London King's Cross
- 4 tpd to Aberdeen, via Dundee (3 tpd on weekends)
- 1 tpd to Inverness, via Stirling, Perth and Aviemore.

As of the December 2025 timetable, LNER operates five daily "named" passenger services to and from Waverley. Each of these is identified by a two-letter code in the timetable.

CrossCountry

- 1 tph to Plymouth, via Newcastle, Leeds, Sheffield, Birmingham New Street and Bristol Temple Meads; 2 tpd extend to Penzance
- 3 tpd to Glasgow Central, via Motherwell (1 tpd on Sundays)
- 1 tpd to Aberdeen, via Dundee.

Avanti West Coast

- 1 tp2h to London Euston, via Carlisle, Preston and Birmingham New Street.

TransPennine Express

- 1 tp2h to Manchester Airport, via Carlisle and Preston
- 8 tpd to Newcastle.

Lumo

- 5 tpd to London King's Cross, via Morpeth and Newcastle.
- 2 tpd to Glasgow Queen Street via Falkirk High.

Lumo started operating services between London King's Cross and Edinburgh Waverley in October 2021, via Stevenage, Newcastle and Morpeth.

Caledonian Sleeper

- 2 tpd to London Euston (Highland and Lowland sleepers)
- 1 tpd to Aberdeen, Inverness and Fort William (train divides on arrival at Edinburgh).

ScotRail

- 2 tph to Glasgow Queen Street, via Falkirk High (ScotRail Express)
- 2 tph to Helensburgh Central, via Airdrie and Glasgow Queen Street Low Level
- 1 tph to Glasgow Central, via Shotts
- 1 tp2h to Glasgow Central, via Carstairs and Motherwell
- 1 tp2h to Dunbar, via Musselburgh
- 1 tph to North Berwick, via Musselburgh
- 2 tph to Tweedbank, via Newtongrange
- 2 tph to Dunblane, via Falkirk Grahamston and Stirling
- 1 tph to Dundee, via Kirkcaldy
- 1 tph to Perth, via Kirkcaldy
- 1 tph to Cowdenbeath, via Dunfermline City
- 1 tph to Glenrothes with Thornton, via Dunfermline City and Cowdenbeath
- 1 tph to Aberdeen, via Dundee and Arbroath
- 1 tph to Leven, via Inverkeithing
- 5 tpd to Inverness, via Stirling, Perth and Aviemore.

=== Routes – present and past ===
Preceding station	National Rail	Following station
Morpeth	Lumo; East Coast Main Line	Terminus
Newcastle	London North Eastern Railway East Coast Main Line semi-fast	Terminus
Berwick-upon-Tweed	London North Eastern Railway East Coast Main Line fast	Terminus
Berwick-upon-Tweed	London North Eastern Railway East Coast Main Line fast	Haymarket
Berwick-upon-Tweed	CrossCountry Edinburgh–Plymouth	Terminus
Berwick-upon-Tweed	CrossCountry Edinburgh–Plymouth	Haymarket
East Linton	TransPennine Express Newcastle–Edinburgh	Terminus
Terminus	TransPennine Express Anglo-Scottish Route	Haymarket
Terminus	Avanti West Coast Edinburgh–Birmingham–London	Haymarket
Terminus	ScotRail Edinburgh–Aberdeen	Haymarket
Terminus	ScotRail Edinburgh–Dundee line	Haymarket
Terminus	ScotRail Edinburgh–Inverness	Haymarket
Terminus	ScotRail Fife Circle Line	Haymarket
Terminus	ScotRail Glasgow–Edinburgh via Falkirk line	Haymarket
Terminus	ScotRail North Clyde Line	Haymarket
Terminus	ScotRail Shotts Line	Haymarket
Terminus	ScotRail Glasgow–Edinburgh via Carstairs line	Haymarket
Musselburgh	ScotRail North Berwick Branch line	Terminus
Musselburgh	ScotRail Edinburgh–Dunbar	Terminus
Brunstane	ScotRail Borders Railway	Terminus
Carstairs	Caledonian Sleeper Lowland Sleeper	Terminus
Preston	Caledonian Sleeper Highland Sleeper	Glasgow Queen Street
Preston	Caledonian Sleeper Highland Sleeper	Falkirk Grahamston Southbound only
Preston	Caledonian Sleeper Highland Sleeper	Stirling
Preston	Caledonian Sleeper Highland Sleeper	Inverkeithing
	Historical railways	
Terminus	North British Railway; NBR Main Line	Jock's Lodge; Line open, station closed
Terminus	North British Railway; Edinburgh and Glasgow Railway	Haymarket; Line and station open
	Disused railways	
Terminus as Canal Street Station	North British Railway; Edinburgh, Leith and Newhaven Railway	Scotland Street; Line and station closed
Terminus	North British Railway; Edinburgh, Leith and Granton Railway	Abbeyhill; Line and station closed
Haymarket; Line and station open	North British Railway; Edinburgh Suburban Line	Abbeyhill; Line and station closed

== Layout ==
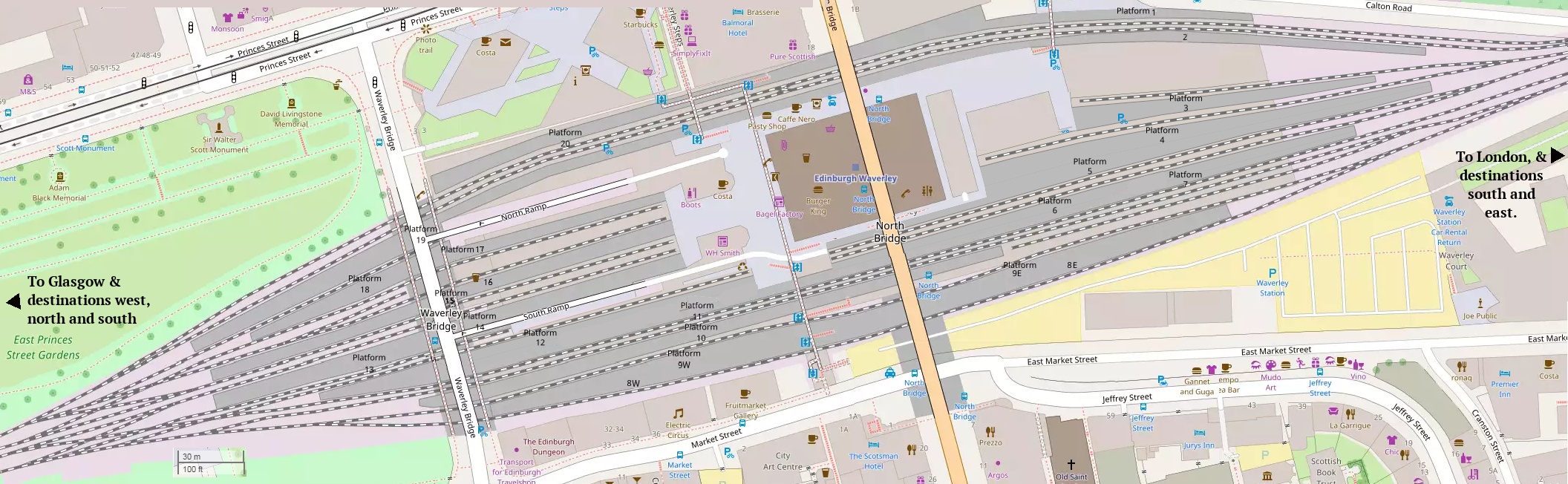
Layout map of Waverley station

The main station facilities are located in the middle of what is essentially a large island platform which is surrounded by platforms on all four sides. There are 20 numbered platforms, in a clockwise direction from the north east. There are three pairs of platforms which share the same tracks.

- There are two tracks on the north side. The northernmost track is split between Platform 20 (west) and Platform 1 (east) and the other is split between Platform 19 (west) and Platform 2 (east).
- There are four east-facing bay platforms, Platforms 3–6.
- There are four tracks on the south side. From north to south, these are:
  - A track which is split between Platform 11 (west) and Platform 7 (east).
  - Platform 10.
  - Platform 9, which is subdivided into "9w" (west) and "9e" (east) sections.
  - Platform 8, which is subdivided likewise.
- There are seven west-facing bay platforms, Platforms 12–18.

== Other transport connections ==
Although there is currently no direct interchange, the nearest tram stop on the Edinburgh Trams service between Edinburgh Airport and Newhaven is St Andrew Square. The tram stop also serves the adjacent Edinburgh bus station, about 200 metres from Waverley station. Some bus services also stop outside the station at Princes Street while taxi ranks are located outside at Market Street.

== Future developments ==
In March 2019, Network Rail announced proposals to redevelop Waverley station in order to meet an anticipated increase in passenger demand by 2048. The Waverley Masterplan drawn up by engineering firm Arup Group envisages the creation of a new mezzanine level concourse above the main platforms to facilitate passenger circulation within the station, with a link through to the neighbouring Waverley Mall shopping centre. As part of the redevelopment, the entrance ramps from Waverley Bridge into the station would be removed and the new concourse would be enclosed in plate glass to provide panoramic views over the Old Town. The plans also make reference to a "transport hub", although a direct interchange with Edinburgh Trams is not specified.

The 2025 consultation on a proposed tram route from Granton to the BioQuarter includes a lift connecting Waverley Station to North Bridge, where the first stop on the line south from Princes Street to the BioQuarter is planned to be built.

== See also ==
- Railtrack (Waverley Station) Order Confirmation Act 2000
