= Dal Bello =

Dal Bello is an Italian surname.

People with this surname include:

- Cristian (footballer, born 1999) (Cristian Daniel Dal Bello Fagundes) Brazilian soccer player; patrilineal surname Dal Bello, matrilineal surname Fagundes (Note: sort with patrilineal surname per Portuguese language practice as the primary surname)
- Dalbello (Lisa Dal Bello; born 1959), Canadian musician
- Mattia Dal Bello (1984–2004), Italian footballer

== See also ==
- Felipe (footballer, born July 1984) (Felipe Dias da Silva dal Belo), Brazilian soccer player; patrilineal surname da Silva, matrilineal surname dal Belo
- Bello (disambiguation)
- Belo (disambiguation)
- Dal (disambiguation)
