= Belu =

Belu may refer to:

== People ==
- Belu (Assyrian king), an early Assyrian king
- Octavian Bellu (born 1951), Romanian gymnastics coach
- Belu-Simion Fainaru (born 1959), Israeli sculptor born in Bucharest, Romania
- Belu Zilber (1901–1978), Romanian communist activist

== Other uses ==
- Belu (company), a bottled water company
- Belu (province), former Portuguese name for eastern part of Timor island
- Belu Regency, a regency in East Nusa Tenggara province of Indonesia
- Alternative name of the demon Belial
- Belu, Iran (disambiguation), places in Iran

== See also ==
- Bēlu
- Belus (disambiguation)
- Bellu (disambiguation)
- Belo (disambiguation)
