= Belus =

Belus (Latin) or Belos (Ancient Greek: Βῆλος, Bē̂los) was the indifferent classical rendering of the Semitic words bēlu and baʿal ("lord") as a theonym, personal name, and royal title.

Belus may refer to:

== In myth and legend ==
- Belus (Assyrian), the Babylonian Marduk as a legendary king of Assyria
- Belus (Babylonian) or Zeus Belos, alternate name of the Babylonian god Marduk
- Belus (Egyptian), the Canaanite Baʿal as a legendary king of Egypt
- Belus (Lydian), a legendary ancestor of Lydia's Heraclid dynasty
- Belus (Tyre), a legendary king of Tyre in Virgil's Aeneid
- Belus, father of Palamedes in Virgil's Aeneid
- Baal, a title meaning "lord" in Semitic languages spoken during antiquity; applied to gods
- Bel (god), in Mesopotamian mythology

== Places ==
- Belus River, a river in Israel
- Bélus, a town in the Landes department of France

== Other uses ==
- Beloš or Beluš, Regent of Hungary 1141–1146, Ban of Croatia 1142–1158, Grand Prince of Serbia 1162
- Belus (genus), a genus of weevils
- Belus (album), an album by Burzum
- HSwMS Belos, several ships the Swedish Navy
- Emperor Belos, the main antagonist of the Disney Channel animated series The Owl House

== See also ==
- EN (cuneiform), used to render the Akkadian bēlu
- En (cuneiform)
- Bel (disambiguation)
- Belu (disambiguation)
- Baal (disambiguation)
