= Baluster =

Architectural element; vertical moulded shaft

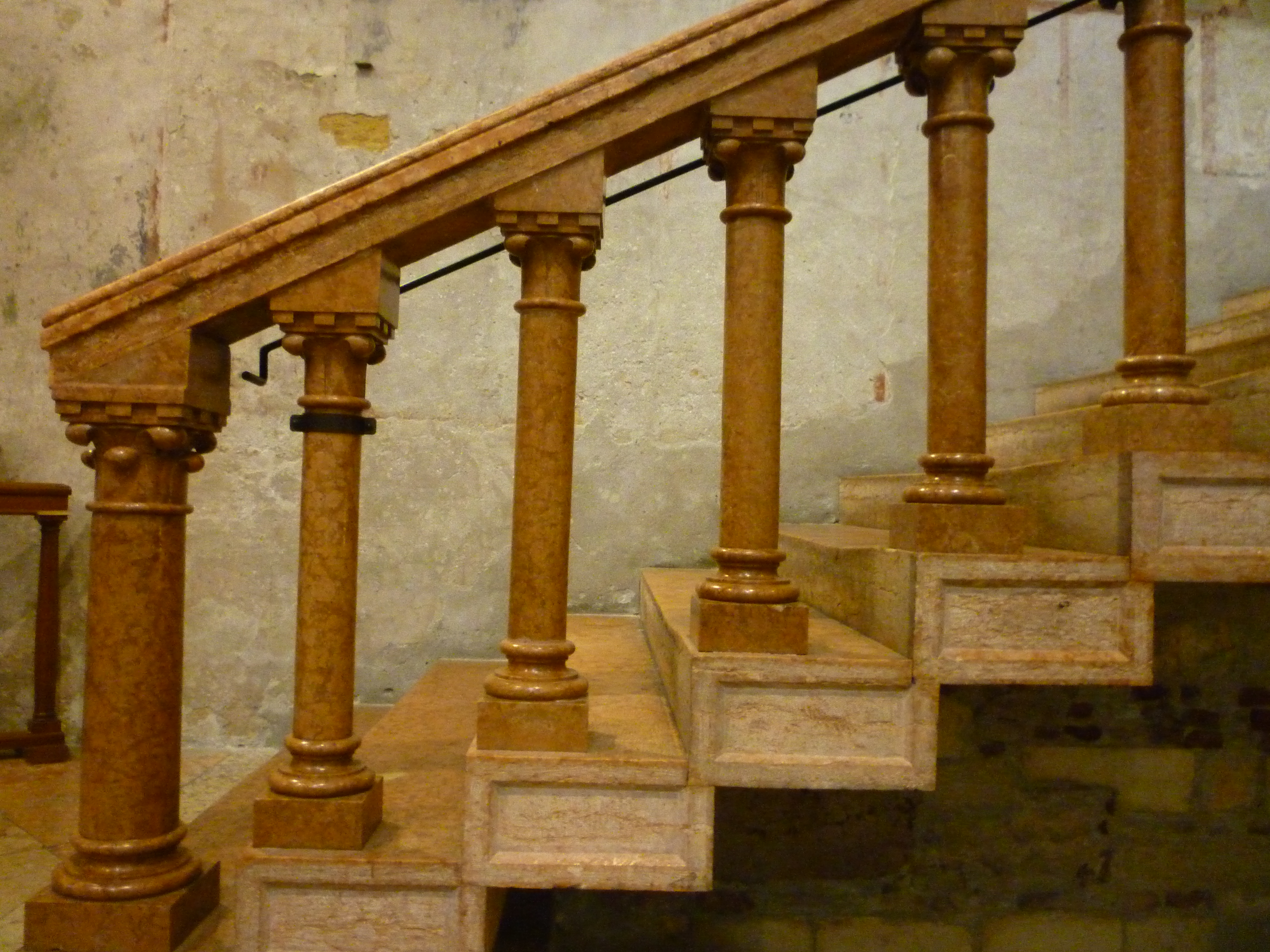
Stone balusters in the Basilica of San Zeno, Verona (constructed 967–1398 AD)

A baluster (/ˈbæləstər/) is an upright support, often a vertical moulded shaft, square, or lathe-turned form found in stairways, parapets, and other architectural features. In furniture construction it is known as a spindle. Common materials used in its construction are wood, stone, and less frequently metal and ceramic. A group of balusters supporting a guard railing, coping, or ornamental detail is known as a balustrade.

The term baluster shaft is used to describe forms such as a candlestick, upright furniture support, and the stem of a brass chandelier.

The term banister (also bannister) refers to a baluster or to the system of balusters and handrail of a stairway. It may be used to include its supporting structures, such as a supporting newel post.

In the UK, there are different height requirements for domestic and commercial balustrades, as outlined in Approved Document K.

== History ==
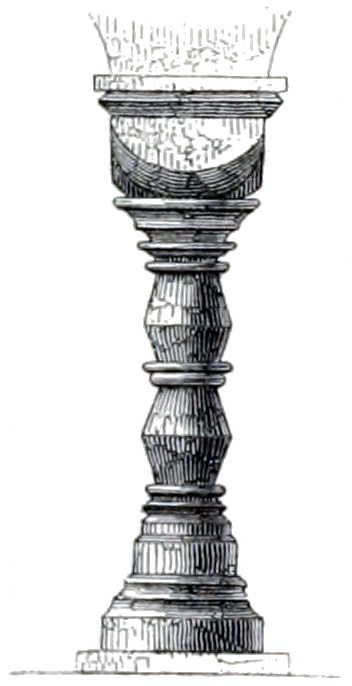
Drawing of a baluster column in the article "Anglo-Saxon Architecture" in the Archaeological Journal, Volume 1 (1845)

The earliest examples of balusters are those shown in the bas-reliefs representing the Assyrian palaces, where they were employed as functional window balustrades and apparently had Ionic capitals. As an architectural element alone the balustrade did not seem to have been known to either the Greeks or the Romans, but baluster forms are familiar in the legs of chairs and tables represented in Roman bas-reliefs, where the original legs or the models for cast bronze ones were shaped on the lathe, or in Antique marble candelabra, formed as a series of stacked bulbous and disc-shaped elements, both kinds of sources familiar to Quattrocento designers.

The application to architecture was a feature of the early Renaissance architecture: late fifteenth-century examples are found in the balconies of palaces at Venice and Verona. These quattrocento balustrades are likely to be following yet-unidentified Gothic precedents. They form balustrades of colonettes as an alternative to miniature arcading.

Rudolf Wittkower withheld judgement as to the inventor of the baluster and credited Giuliano da Sangallo with using it consistently as early as the balustrade on the terrace and stairs at the Medici villa at Poggio a Caiano (c 1480), and used balustrades in his reconstructions of antique structures. Sangallo passed the motif to Bramante (his Tempietto, 1502) and Michelangelo, through whom balustrades gained wide currency in the 16th century.

Wittkower distinguished two types, one symmetrical in profile that inverted one bulbous vase-shape over another, separating them with a cushionlike torus or a concave ring, and the other a simple vase shape, whose employment by Michelangelo at the Campidoglio steps (c 1546), noted by Wittkower, was preceded by very early vasiform balusters in a balustrade round the drum of Santa Maria delle Grazie (c 1482), and railings in the cathedrals of Aquileia (c 1495) and Parma, in the cortile of San Damaso, Vatican, and Antonio da Sangallo's crowning balustrade on the Santa Casa at Loreto installed in 1535, and liberally in his model for the Basilica of Saint Peter. Because of its low center of gravity, this "vase-baluster" may be given the modern term "dropped baluster".

== Etymology ==
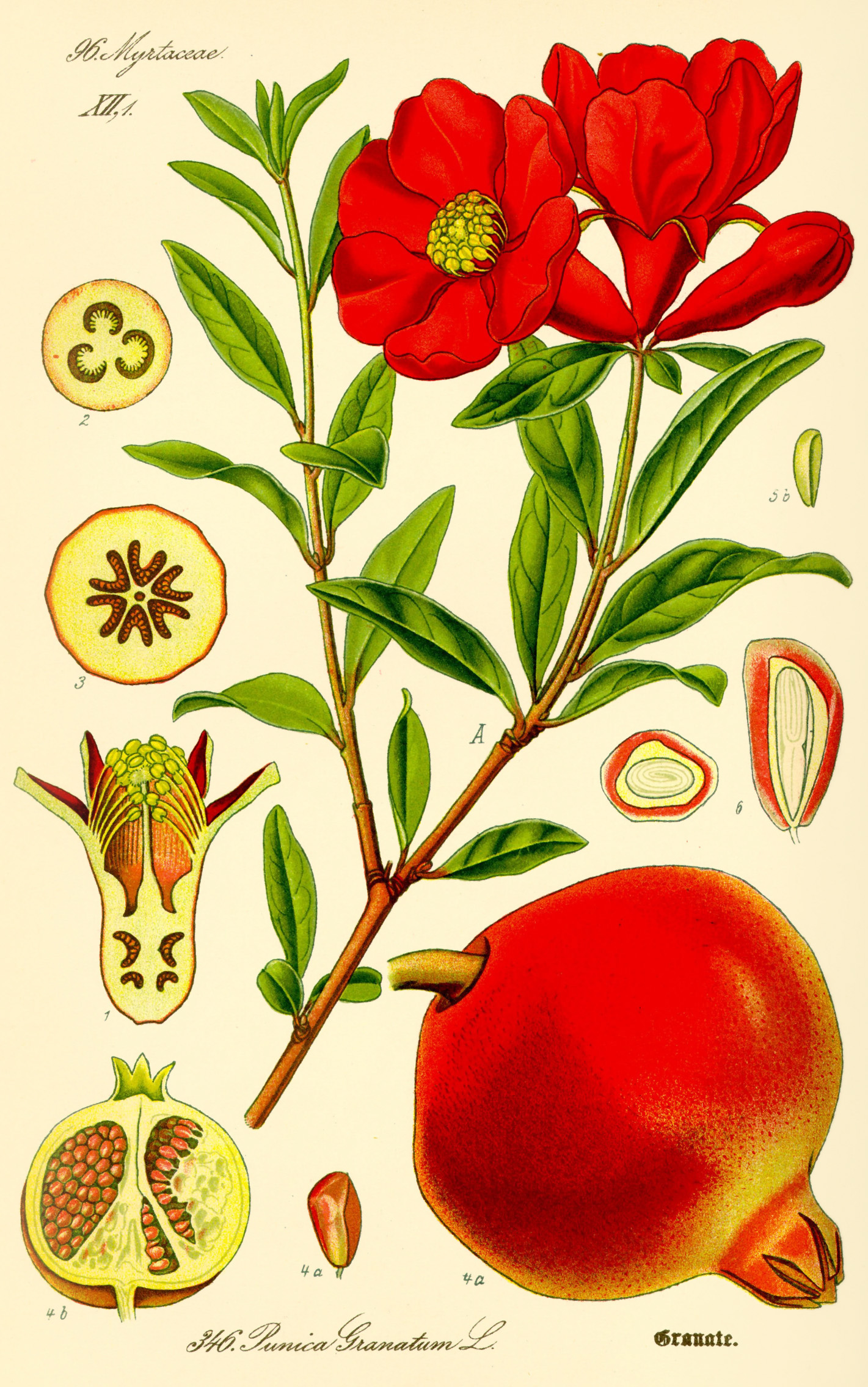
The term derives from the swelling form of the half-open flower of Punica granatum, in Italian balaustra

According to the Oxford English Dictionary, "baluster" is derived through the French: balustre, from Italian: balaustro, from balaustra, "pomegranate flower" [from a resemblance to the swelling form of the half-open flower (illustration, upper right)], from Latin balaustrium, from Greek βαλαύστριον (balaustrion).

== Profiles and style changes ==
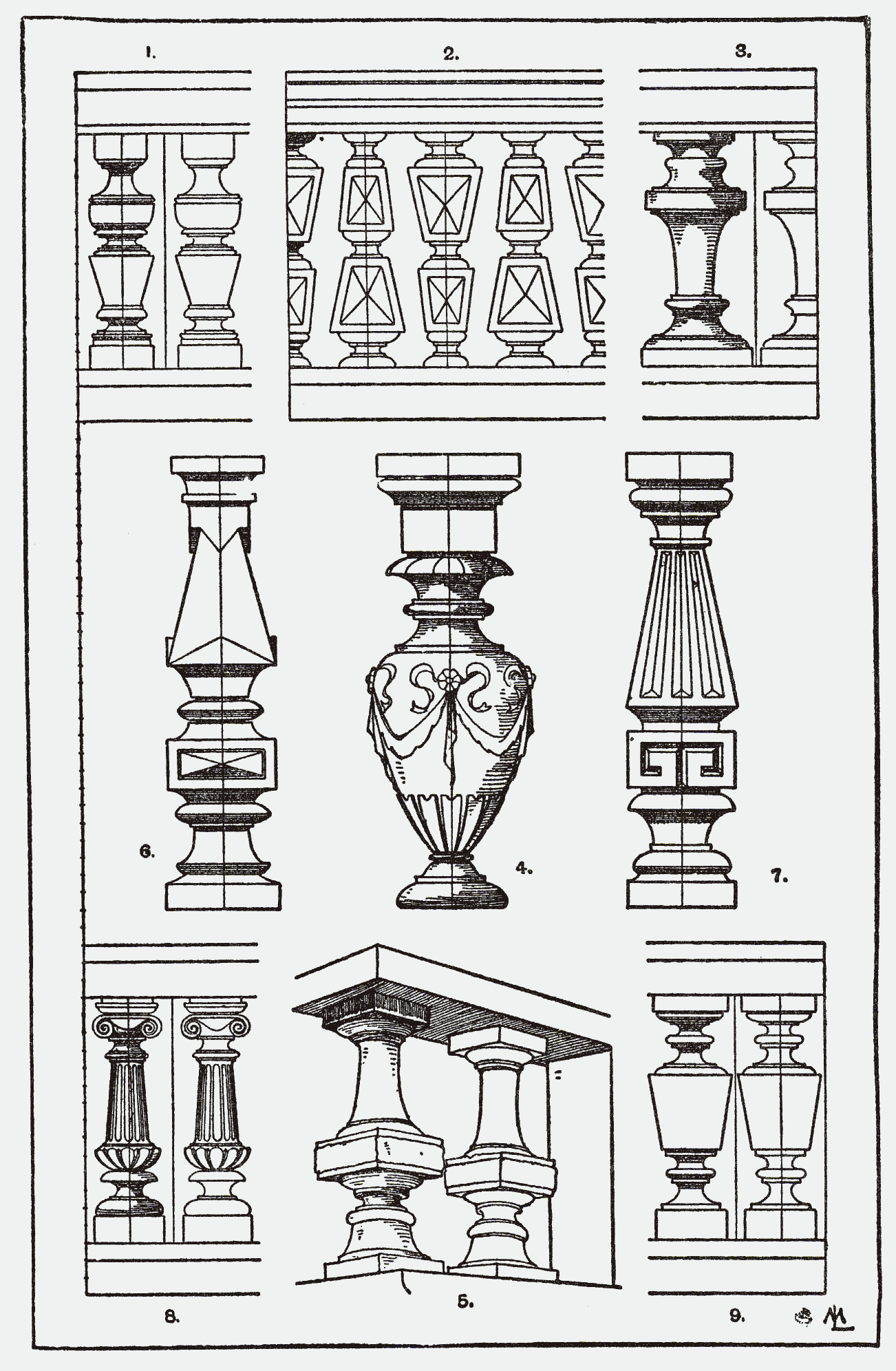
Illustration of various examples of balusters, in A Handbook of Ornament, by Franz S. Meyer

The baluster, being a turned structure, tends to follow design precedents that were set in woodworking and ceramic practices, where the turner's lathe and the potter's wheel are ancient tools. The profile a baluster takes is often diagnostic of a particular style of architecture or furniture, and may offer a rough guide to date of a design, though not of a particular example.

Some complicated Mannerist baluster forms can be read as a vase set upon another vase. The high shoulders and bold, rhythmic shapes of the Baroque vase and baluster forms are distinctly different from the sober baluster forms of Neoclassicism, which look to other precedents, like Greek amphoras. The distinctive twist-turned designs of balusters in oak and walnut English and Dutch seventeenth-century furniture, which took as their prototype the Solomonic column that was given prominence by Bernini, fell out of style after the 1710s.

Once it had been taken from the lathe, a turned wood baluster could be split and applied to an architectural surface, or to one in which architectonic themes were more freely treated, as on cabinets made in Italy, Spain and Northern Europe from the sixteenth through the seventeenth centuries. Modern baluster design is also in use for example in designs influenced by the Arts and Crafts movement in a 1905 row of houses in Etchingham Park Road Finchley London England.

Outside Europe, the baluster column appeared as a new motif in Mughal architecture, introduced in Shah Jahan's interventions in two of the three great fortress-palaces, the Red Fort of Agra and Delhi, in the early seventeenth century. Foliate baluster columns with naturalistic foliate capitals, unexampled in previous Indo-Islamic architecture according to Ebba Koch, rapidly became one of the most widely used forms of supporting shaft in Northern and Central India in the eighteenth and nineteenth centuries.

The modern term baluster shaft is applied to the shaft dividing a window in Saxon architecture. In the south transept of the Abbey in St Albans, England, are some of these shafts, supposed to have been taken from the old Saxon church. Norman bases and capitals have been added, together with plain cylindrical Norman shafts.

Balusters are normally separated by at least the same measurement as the size of the square bottom section. Placing balusters too far apart diminishes their aesthetic appeal, and the structural integrity of the balustrade they form. Balustrades normally terminate in heavy newel posts, columns, and building walls for structural support.

Balusters may be formed in several ways. Wood and stone can be shaped on the lathe, wood can be cut from square or rectangular section boards, while concrete, plaster, iron, and plastics are usually formed by molding and casting. Turned patterns or old examples are used for the molds.

== Materials used ==
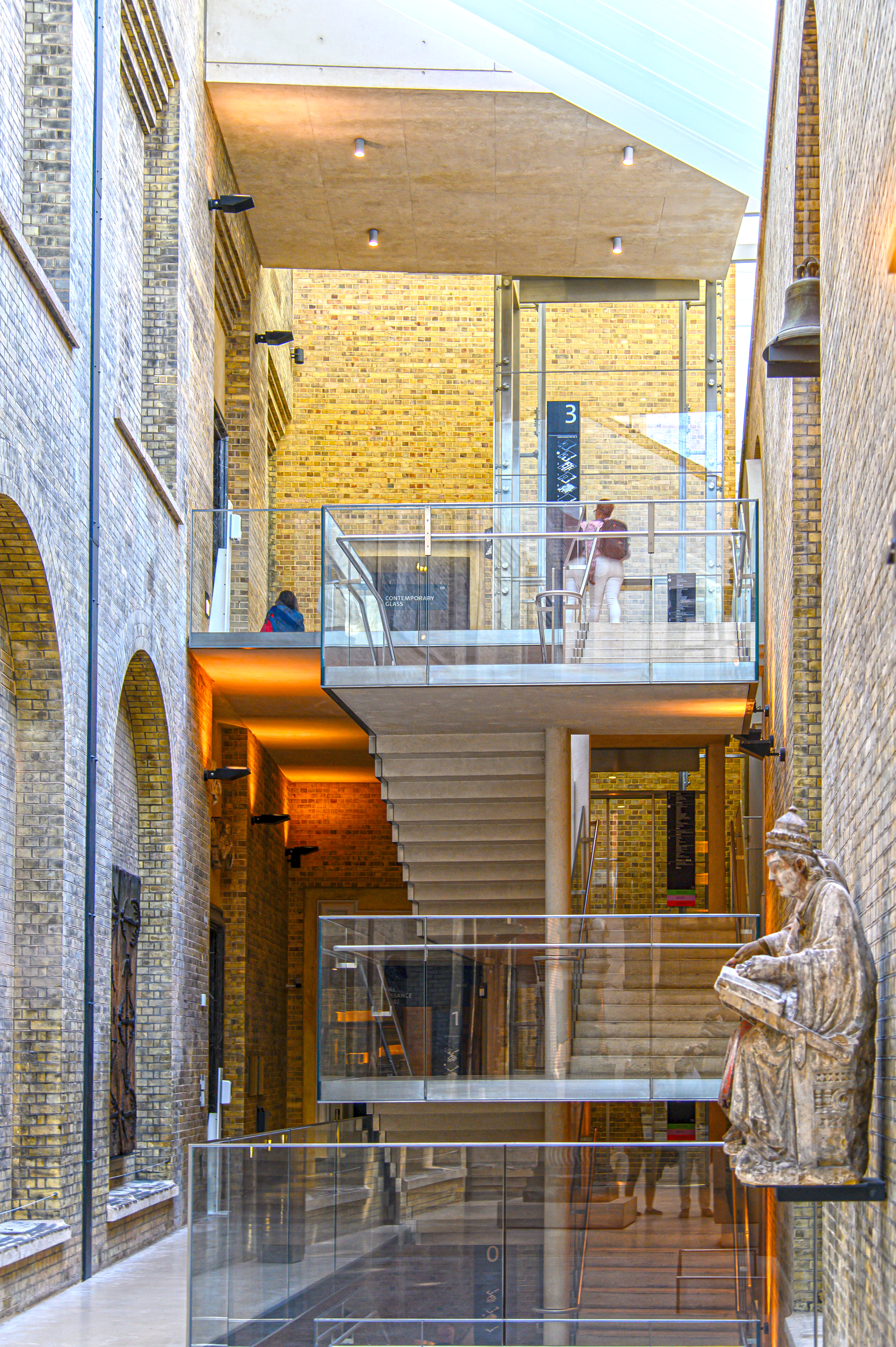
Glass and stainless steel balustrades in the Daylit Gallery of the V&A Museum, London, UK

Balusters may be made of carved stone, cast stone, plaster, polymer, polyurethane/polystyrene, polyvinyl chloride (PVC), precast concrete, wood, or wrought iron. Cast-stone balusters were a development of the 18th century in Great Britain (see Coade stone), and cast iron balusters a development largely of the 1840s. As balusters and balustrades have evolved, they can now be made from various materials with a few popular choices being timber, glass and stainless steel.

== Gallery ==
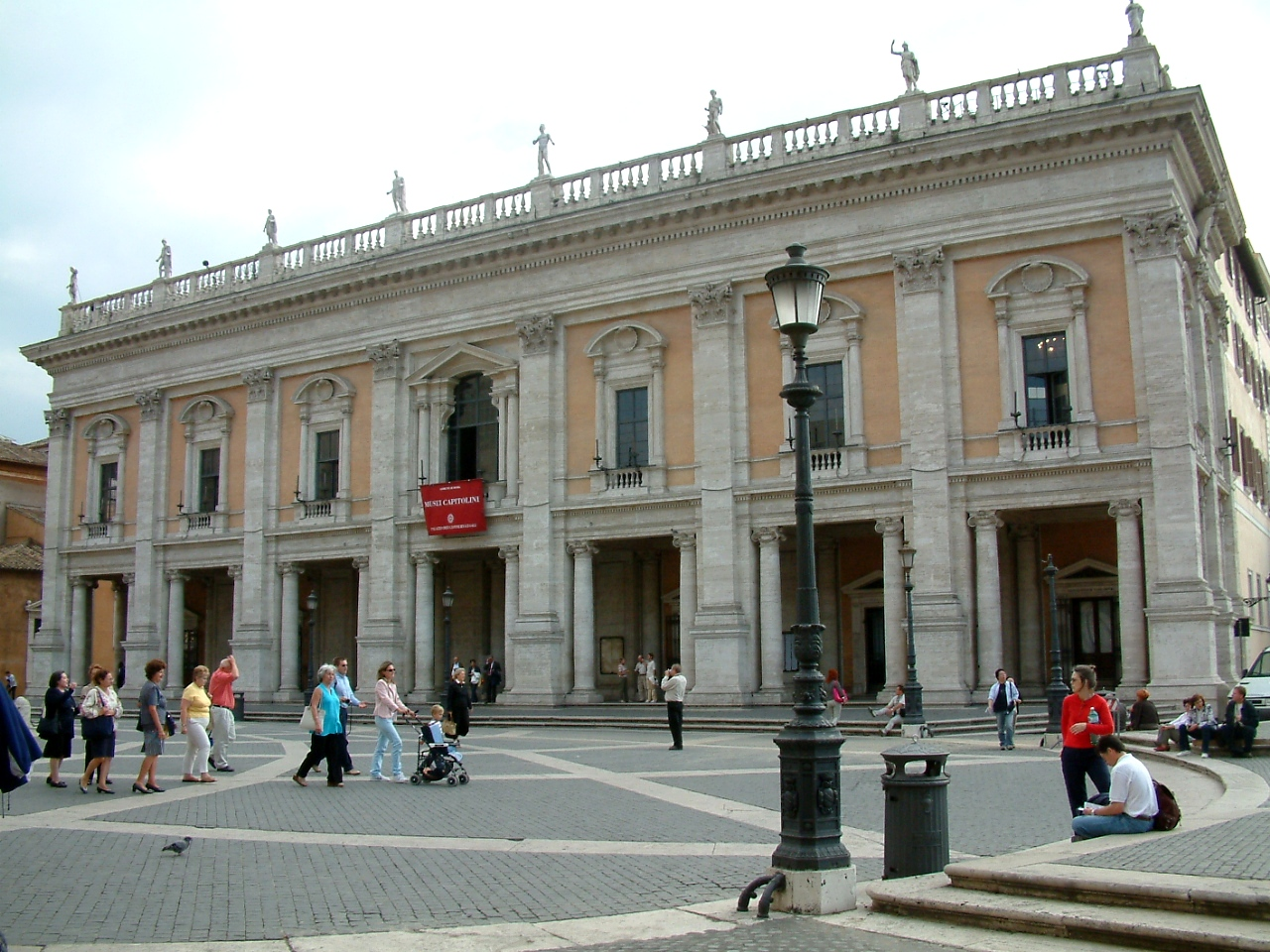
A vasiform balustrade crowns Michelangelo's Palazzo dei Conservatori on the Campidoglio, Rome

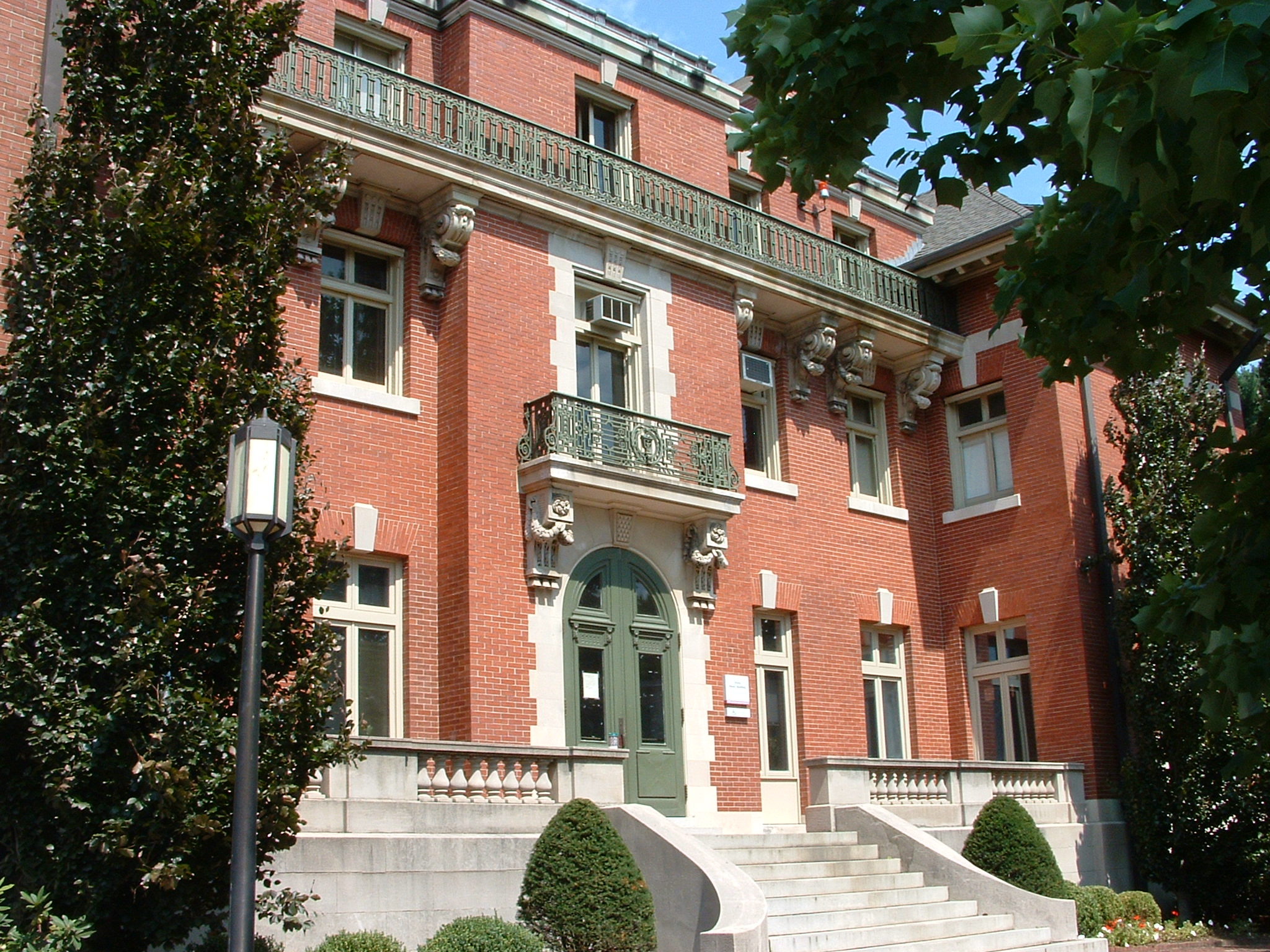
Ornate upper bronze balustrade, lower vasiform stone balustrade, and bronze central rail supported by decorative bronze metalwork at Brown University's Orwig Music Library, Providence, Rhode Island

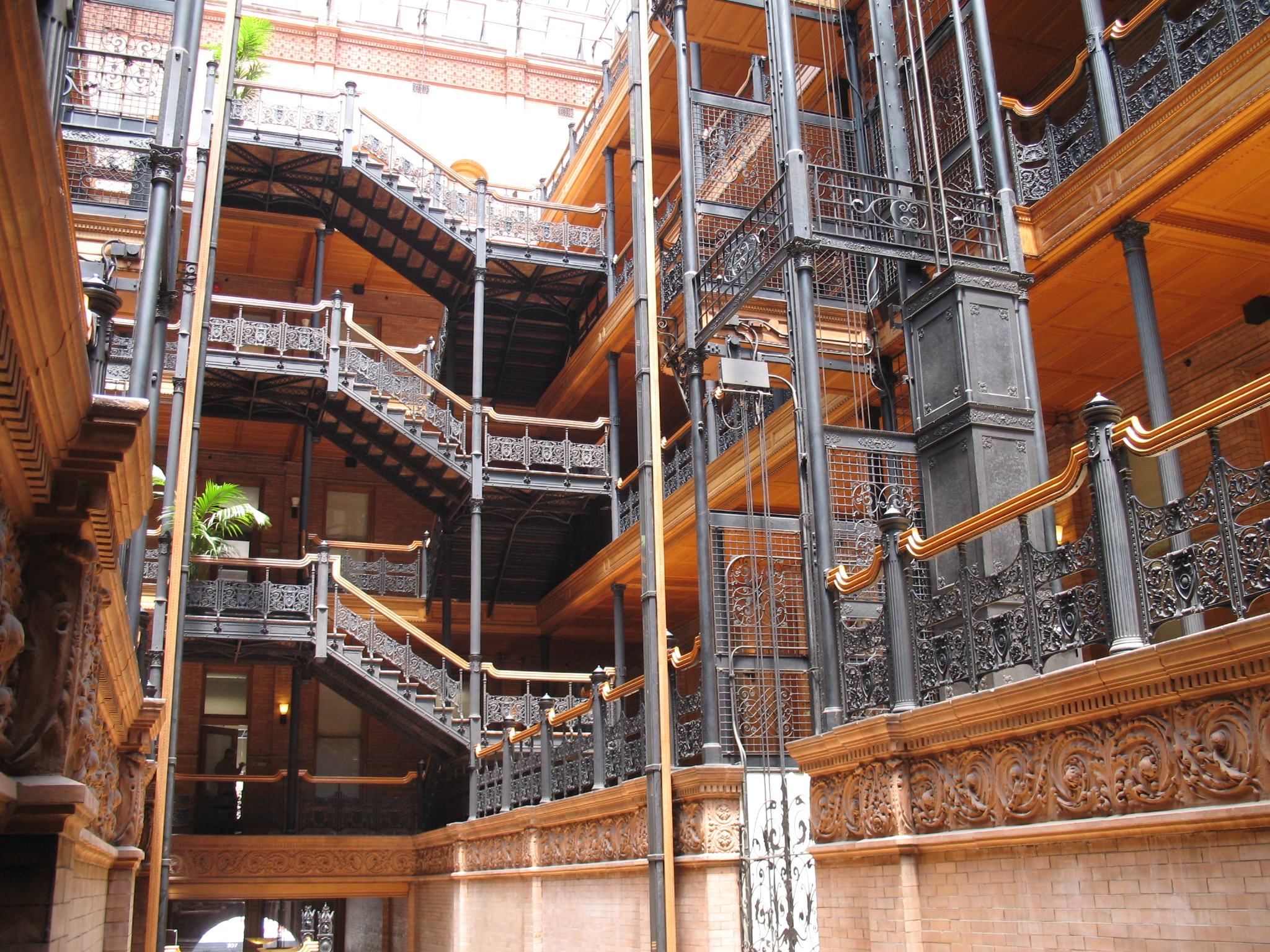
Ornate cast iron filigree balustrades in the Bradbury Building in downtown Los Angeles, California

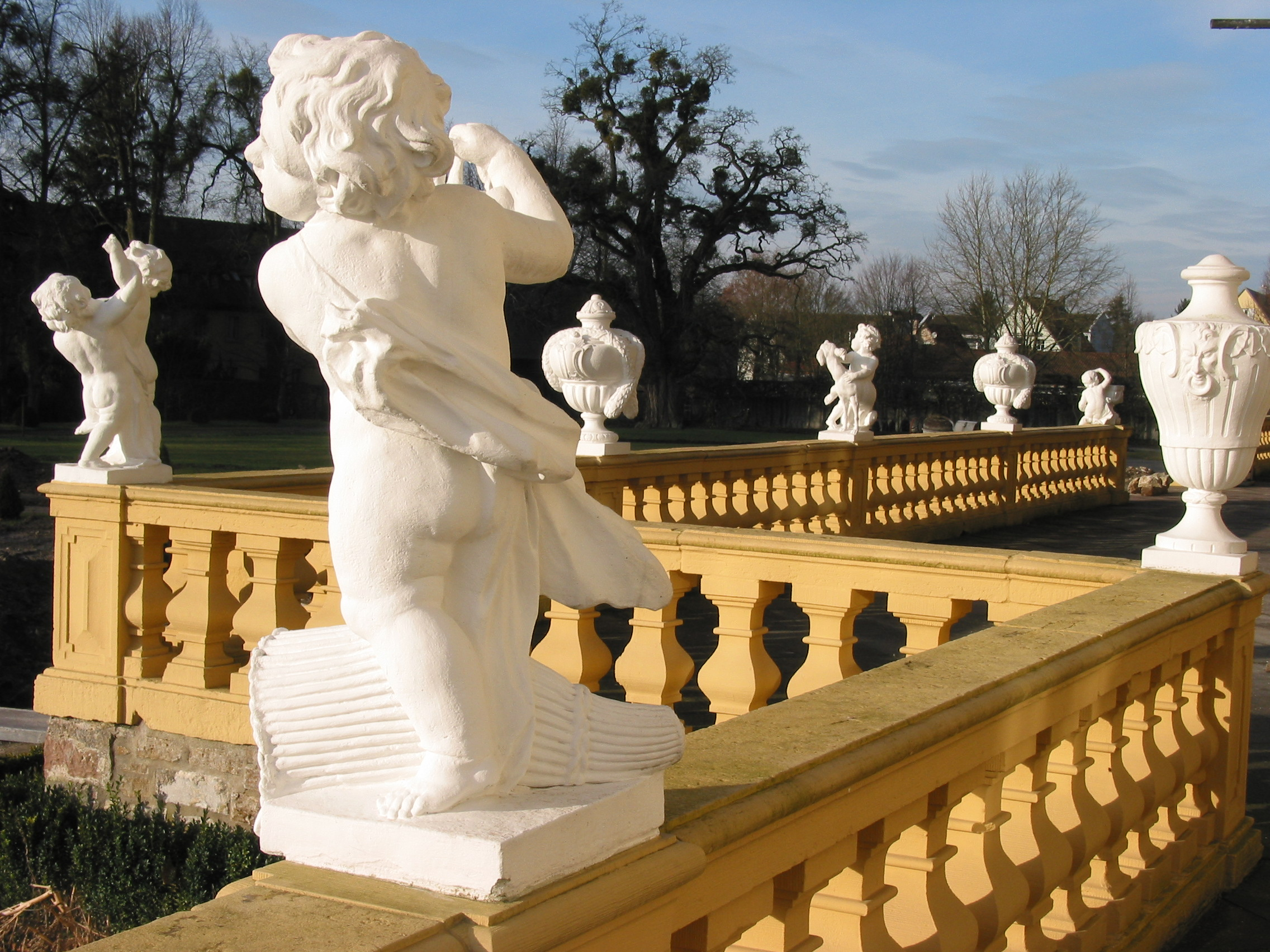
Stone balustrade at Schloss Veitshöchheim near Würzburg, Germany

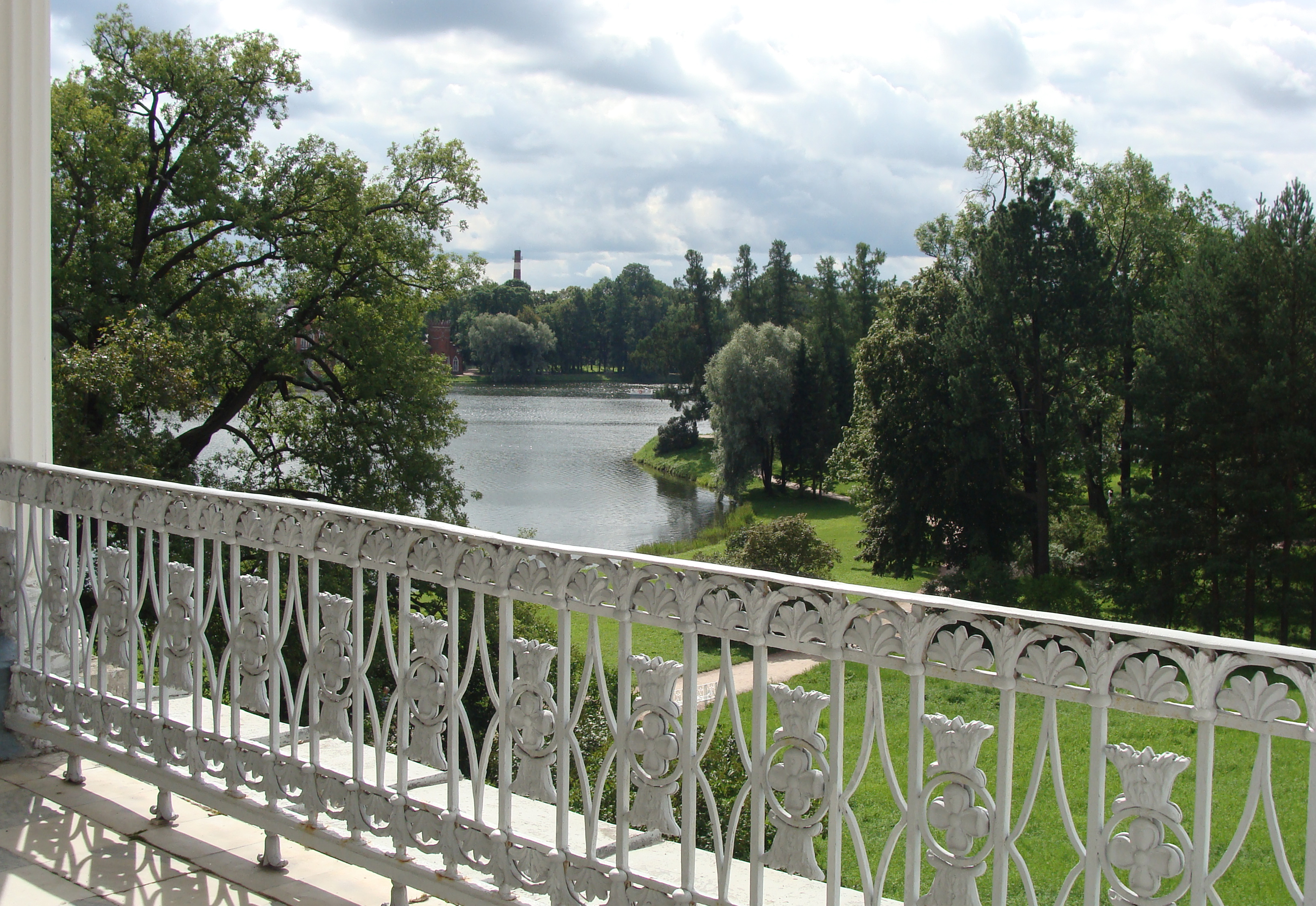
The balustrade of Cameron's Gallery at Tsarskoye Selo, Russia

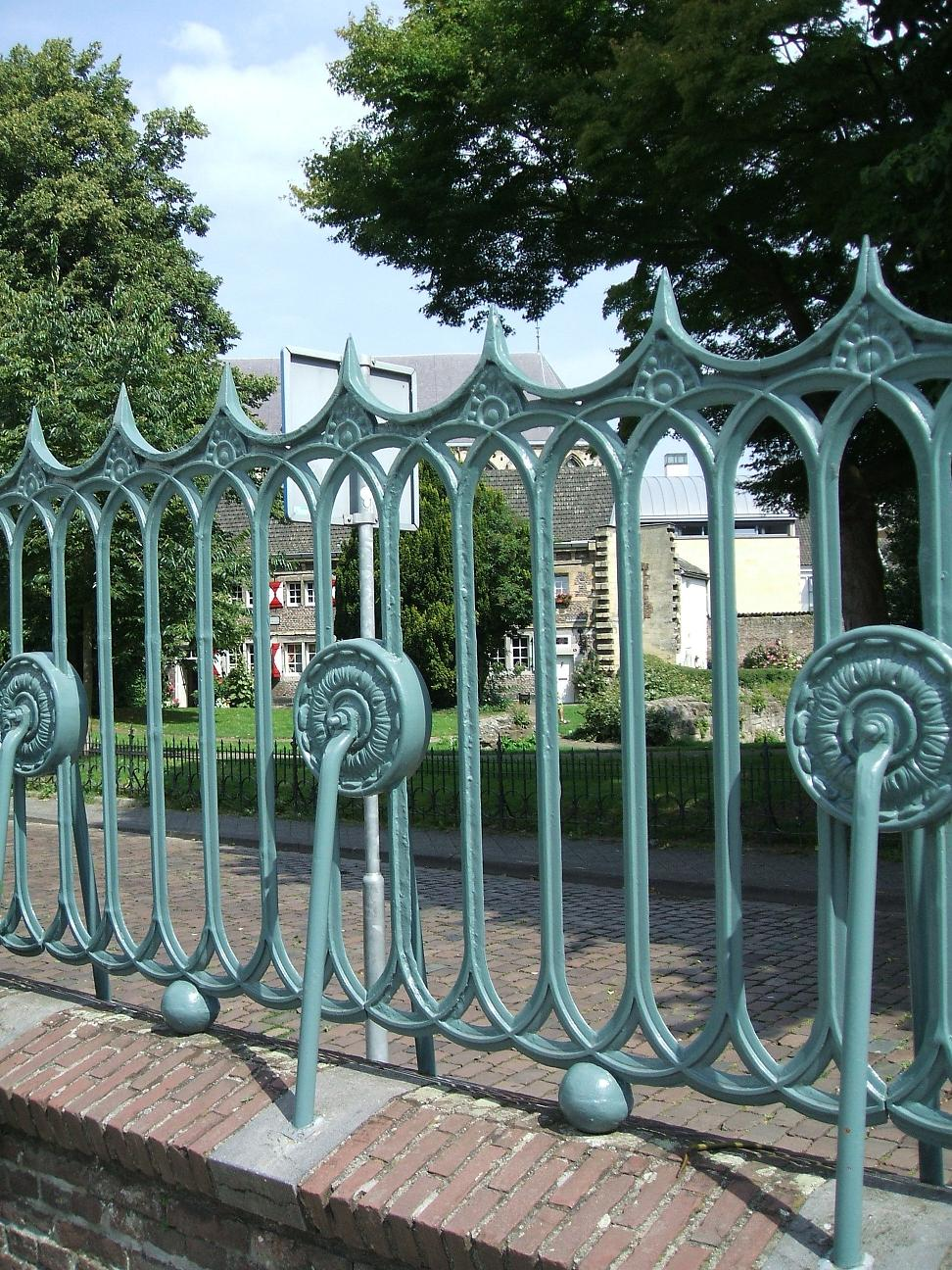
Bronze balustrade, formerly of Saint Servatius bridge of 1836, now in Maastricht, Netherlands

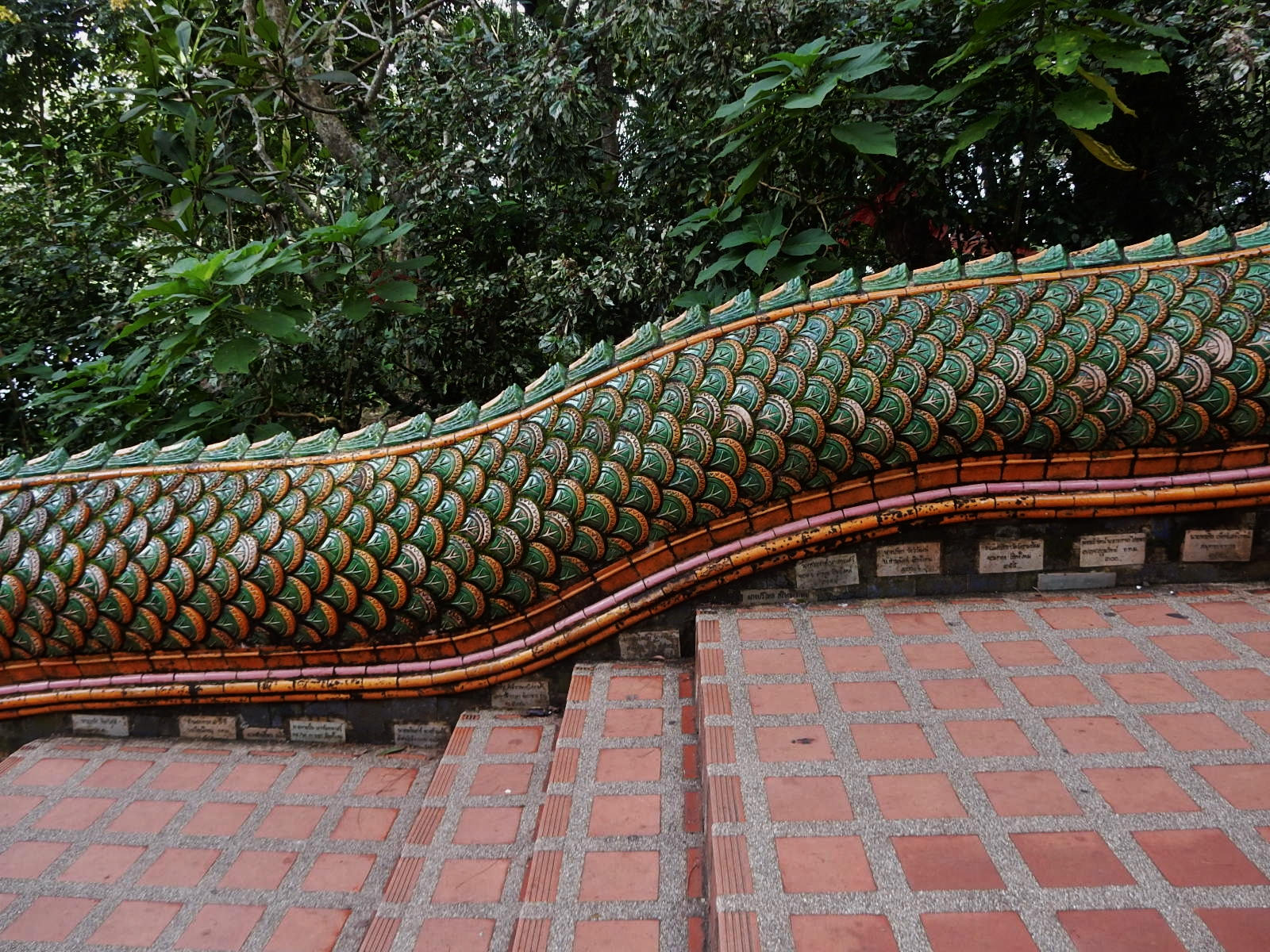
Balustrade in the form of a serpent, Mueang Chiang Mai, Chiang Mai, Thailand

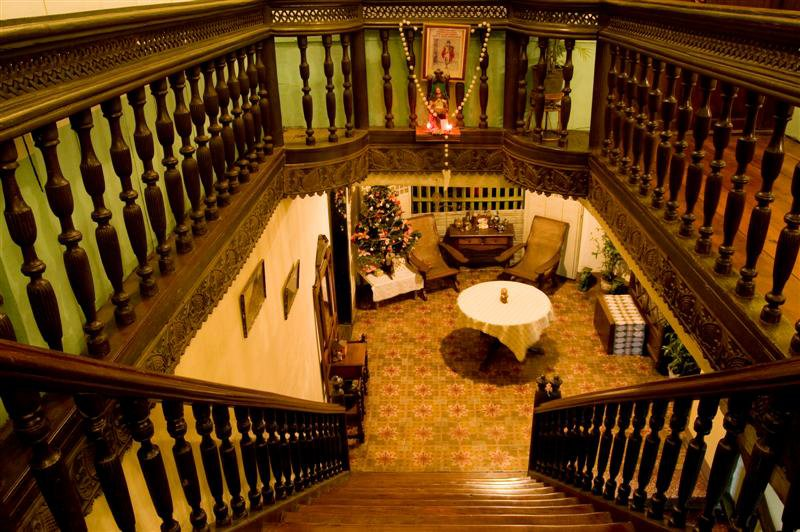
Balustrade of turned wood balusters of Quema Ancestral House, a typical Philippine bahay na bato

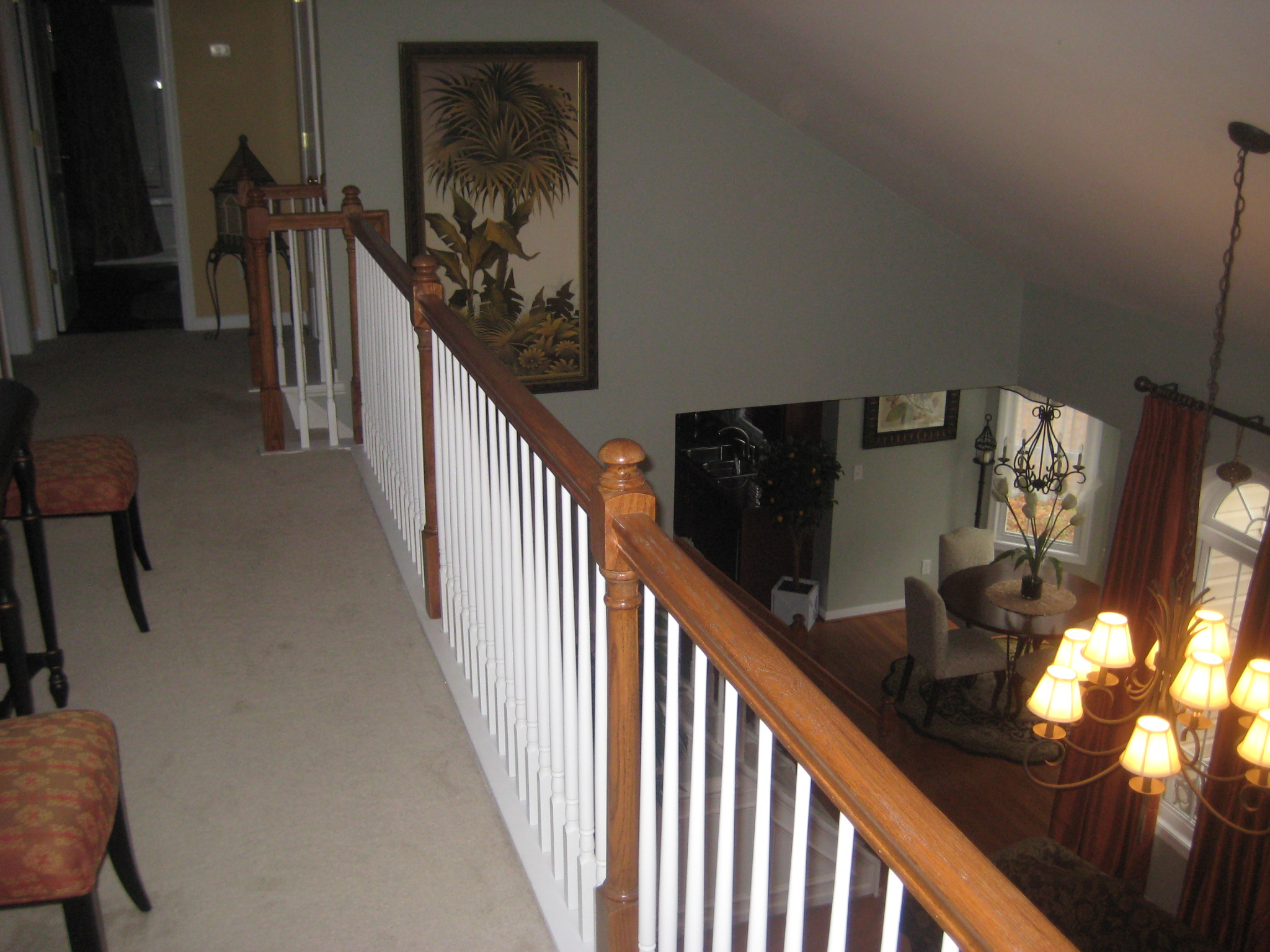
Simple balustrade of turned wood balusters of a style common in North America

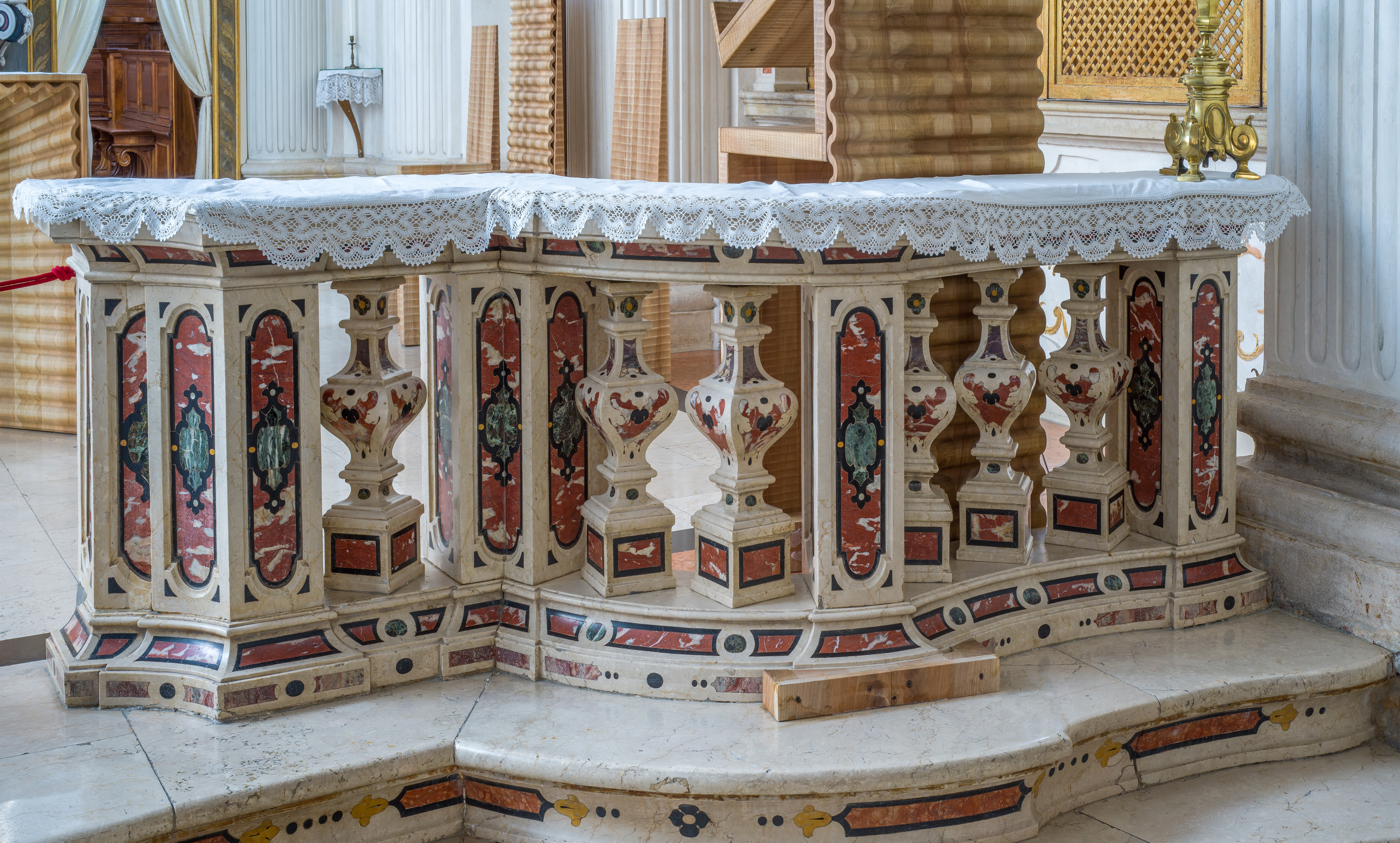
Marble balustrade in San Gaetano, Brescia, Italy

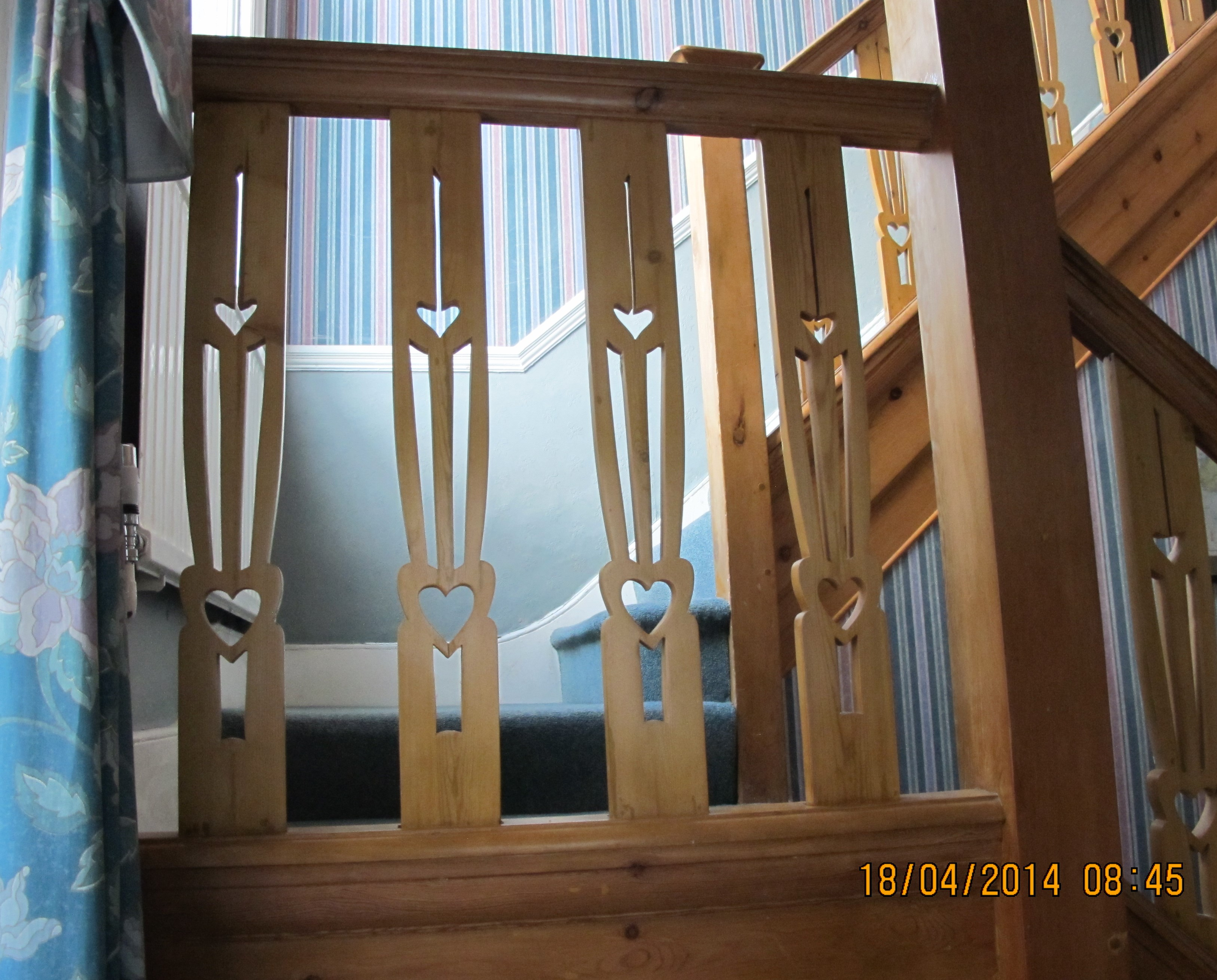
Balusters influenced by the Arts and Crafts movement in a 1905 row of houses in Etchingham Park Road, London

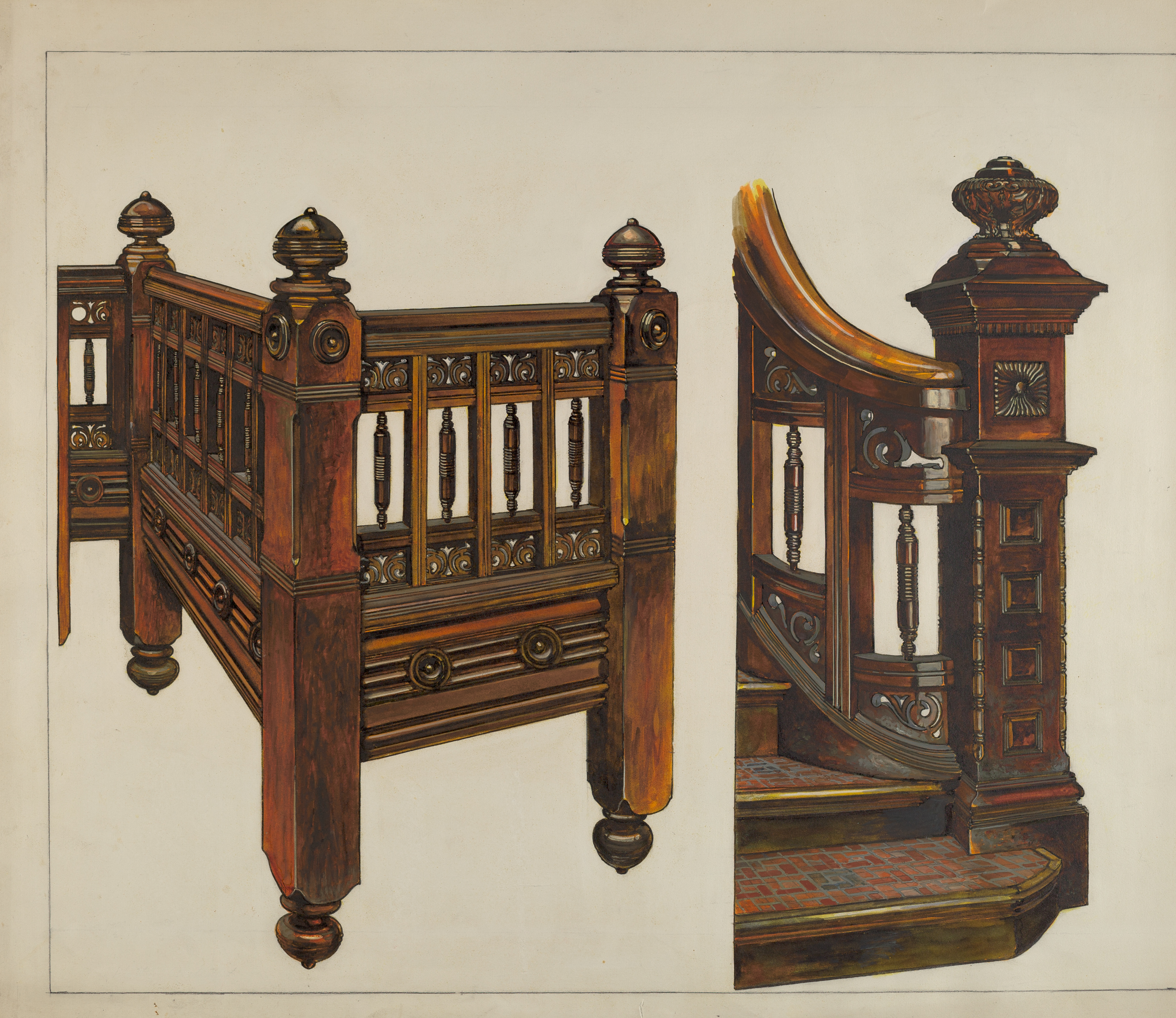
Illustration of balustrade design by Florence Truelson, 1937 (National Gallery of Art)

== See also ==
- Bollard
- Bellows (ornament)
- Guard rail
- Handrail

== General and cited references ==
- Wittkower, Rudolf (1974). "Chapter Three: The Renaissance Caluster and Palladio". Palladio and English Palladianism. Margot Wittkower (foreword). London: Thames and Hudson. ISBN 9780500850015. OCLC 905449767. (Links are to the 1983 American edition.)
