= Bello =

Bello may refer to:

== People ==
- Bello (given name), list of people
- Bello (surname), list of people
- Bello of Carcassonne (died 812), nobleman in Cité de Carcassonne
- Domingo Bello y Espinosa (1817–1884), Spanish lawyer and botanist, cited simply as Bello in botanical names
- Bello Nock, (born 1968), American circus clown often known simply as Bello

== Places ==
- Beyo, Asturias, Spain, a parish
- Bello, Antioquia, Colombia
- Bello, Aragon, Spain
- Bello, Sujawal, Pakistan

== Other uses ==
- Bello (crater), a crater on the planet Mercury
- Bello orthography, a Spanish language orthography developed by Andrés Bello and Juan Garcia del Río
- Atlético Bello, a former Colombian football (soccer) team
- Doctor Bello, a 2013 Nigerian film
- Bello, a character from the children's television show Jelly Jamm

== See also ==
- Bellos
- Bellow (disambiguation)
- Bellu (disambiguation)
- Belo (disambiguation)
- Monte Bello (disambiguation)
- Montebello (disambiguation)
- Portobello (disambiguation)
