= Bellows (surname) =

Bellows is an English surname. Notable people with the surname include:

- Albert Fitch Bellows (1829–1883), American painter
- Brian Bellows (born 1964), Canadian ice hockey player
- Carole Bellows (born 1935), American judge
- Franklin Barney Bellows (1896–1918), American soldier
- Gil Bellows (born 1967), Canadian actor
- George Bellows (1882–1925), American painter
- Henry Adams Bellows (justice) (1803–1873), American lawyer and politician
- Henry Adams Bellows (businessman) (1885–1939), American executive and translator
- Henry Whitney Bellows (1814–1882), American clergyman
- Jim Bellows (1922–2009), American journalist
- John Bellows (1831–1902), English polymath, printer and lexicographer
- Kent Bellows (1949–2005), American painter
- Kieffer Bellows (born 1998), American ice hockey player
- Laurel G. Bellows (fl. 2012–2013), American lawyer
- Shenna Bellows (born 1975), American political activist and politician

== Fictional characters ==
- The Bellows Family, family that includes Sarah, Ephraim, Delanie, Gertrude and Harold Bellows in the 2019 film Scary Stories to Tell in the Dark

== See also ==
- Bellow (disambiguation)
- Bellows (disambiguation)
