= Billow =

Billow or billows may refer to:

- Wave
  - Wind wave
- Billow maidens, Norse mythological wave maidens
- Andrew Billow (1924–2003), American politician
- Richard Billows, American academic

== See also ==
- Bellows (disambiguation)
- Hunan Billows F.C., a Chinese football club
- SS Empire Billow, a ship
