= Bellows (disambiguation) =

A bellows is a device for delivering pressurized air in a controlled quantity to a controlled location.

Bellows may also refer to:

== Things ==
- Bellows (ornament), a decorative pattern used in architecture from the 14th to the 16th century
- Bellows (photography), accordion-like, pleated expandable part of a camera
- Metal bellows, elastic vessels that can be compressed when pressure is applied to the outside of the vessel
- Expansion joints
- Lungs
- Dr. Bellows, a fictional character from the sitcom series I Dream of Jeannie

== Places ==
- Bellows Falls, Vermont
- Mount Bellows, mountain in Antarctica
- Bellows Air Force Station
- Neptune's Bellows, a channel on the southeast side of Deception Island, South Shetland Islands

== People ==
- Bellows (surname)
- Bellows (musician), American musician

== See also ==
- Bellow (disambiguation)
