= Alfred Horatio Belo House =

Historic house in Texas, United States

- U.S. National Register of Historic Places
- Recorded Texas Historic Landmark
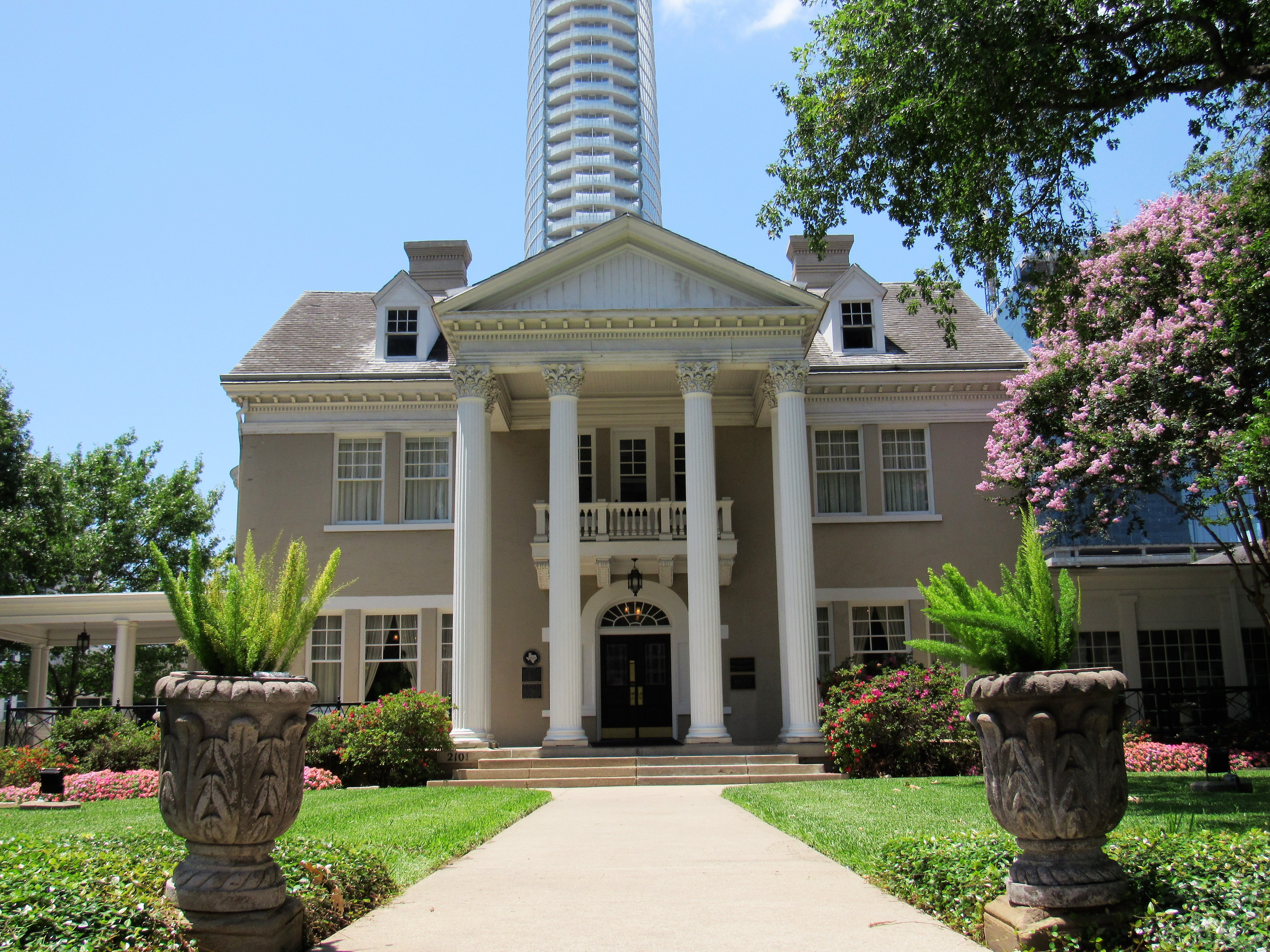
- Belo House in 2017

- Location within Texas Location within the United States
- Location: 2115 Ross Ave., Dallas, Texas
- Coordinates: 32°47′17″N 96°47′52″W
- Area: 1 acre (0.40 ha)
- Built: 1888
- Architect: Herbert M. Greene
- Architectural style: Classical Revival
- NRHP reference No.: 75001965
- RTHL No.: 6592

Significant dates
- Added to NRHP: October 29, 1975
- Designated RTHL: 1980

The Alfred Horatio Belo House is a historic mansion in Dallas, Texas, USA. It was built for Colonel Alfred Horatio Belo, a veteran of the Confederate States Army and founder of The Dallas Morning News, circa 1900. It remained in the Belo family until 1977, when it was acquired by the Dallas Bar Association.

== Location ==
The house is located at 2115 Ross Avenue in Dallas, Texas.

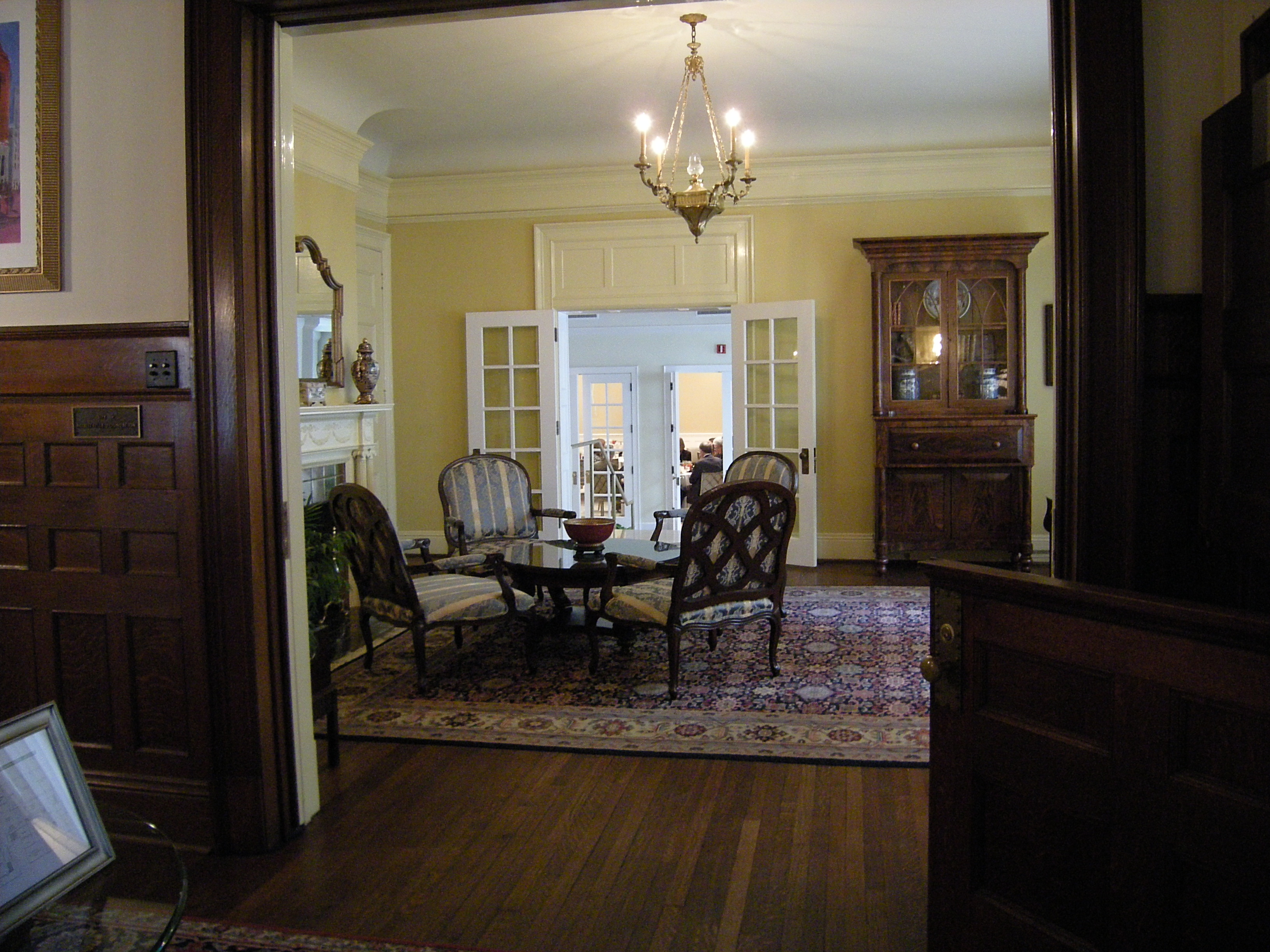
Living-room inside the house.

== History ==
The mansion was built on land formerly owned by Captain William Henry Gaston, a Confederate veteran and banker in Dallas. It was completed circa 1900. It was designed by Herbert M. Greene in the Neoclassical architectural style.

It was built for Colonel Alfred Horatio Belo, a Confederate veteran and the founder of The Dallas Morning News. Belo resided here with his wife, Nettie Ennis Belo, his son, Alfred Horatio Belo, Jr. and his daughter-in-law Helen Ponder, as well as his daughter, Jeannette Belo, who married Dr. Charles Peabody. After Colonel Belo died in 1901 and his son died in 1906, his widow lived here with her son, daughter-in-law, and two granddaughters. After she died in 1913, Helen Ponder Belo and her daughters lived here until 1922, when the Belo family moved back to Col. Belo's home state of North Carolina.

The mansion was leased to house the Loudermilk-Sparkman Funeral Home from 1926 to 1976. In 1977, it was acquired by the Dallas Bar Foundation, the financial arm of the Dallas Bar Association. The foundation restored the mansion, and built an additional pavilion in 2003. It is also used as a venue for weddings, corporate events, and social soirees. In 2021, the building was renamed from the Belo Mansion to the Arts District Mansion, due to Belo's ties to the Confederacy.

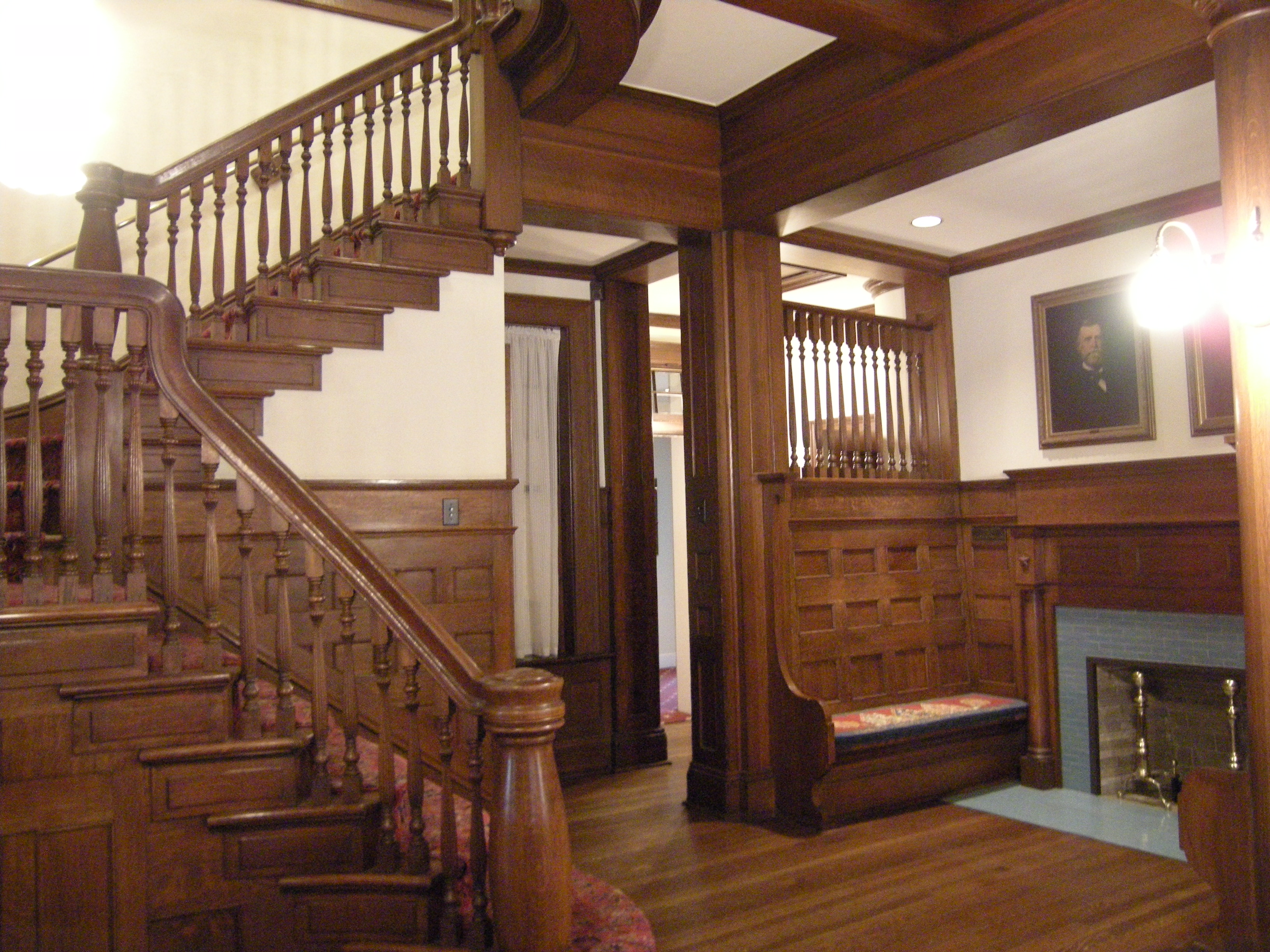
Staircase inside the mansion.

== Architectural significance ==
The mansion has been listed on the National Register of Historic Places since October 29, 1975.

== See also ==
- National Register of Historic Places listings in Dallas County, Texas
- Recorded Texas Historic Landmarks in Dallas County
