= Bellos =

Bellos is a surname. Notable people with the surname include:

- Alex Bellos (born 1969), British author of books on mathematics and football
- Andre Bellos (born 1987), American actor, singer, and dancer
- David Bellos (1945–2025), British academic, translator and biographer, father of Alex Bellos
- Linda Bellos (born 1950), British activist and London politician

== See also ==
- Los bellos durmientes, a 1994 play
