= Bellu =

Bellu may refer to:

- Bellu Cemetery, a famous cemetery in Bucharest, Romania
- Barbu Bellu (1825–1900), Romanian nobleman and politician
- Octavian Bellu (born 1951), Romanian sports coach
- René Bellu (1927–2014), French journalist, illustrator, and historian of the automobile

== See also ==
- Belu (disambiguation)
- Bello (disambiguation)
