= Dallas Bar Association =

Professional lawyer association

The Dallas Bar Association or DBA is a professional organization providing resources for attorneys and the public in the city of Dallas, Texas. Founded in 1873, the DBA is a voluntary professional association of over 11,800 lawyers.

== History ==
The Dallas Bar Association (DBA) was founded by 40 lawyers in 1873, during an era that witnessed remarkable growth in the city of Dallas. As stated in its first charter - signed in 1916 by 100 members - the purpose of "the Bar Association of Dallas" was "for support of a literary undertaking and maintenance of a library."

The Dallas Bar Association has since been dedicated to the continuing education of its members as well as public service programs and the improvement of the administration of justice. For years, Association headquarters were housed in the offices of the then-current presidents. In 1937, headquarters were established in a small space under the stairs of the Old Red Courthouse.

Ten years later, the DBA was the state's first bar association to incorporate. Incorporators envisioned the Association someday being housed in its own building. In 1955, the DBA opened its offices, dining room, and meeting facilities on the lobby floor of the Adolphus Hotel. Membership jumped to nearly 1,500 lawyers by the end of the decade and the facilities were remodeled and expanded in 1965. In 1979, the 3,600-member Association moved into a restored home on Ross Avenue - the Arts District Mansion.

== Governance ==
Past Presidents of the Dallas Bar Association can be viewed at https://www.dallasbar.org/?pg=past-presidents.

The current President of the DBA is Jonathan R. Childers. The last three Presidents were; Vicki Blanton (2025); Bill Mateja (2024); Cheryl Camin Murray (2023).
