= Belo =

Belo may refer to:

== Organizations ==
- Belo Corporation, known as A. H. Belo Corporation from 1926-2000, a United States media company now part of Tegna Inc.
- DallasNews Corporation, known as A. H. Belo Corporation from 2008-2021, a newspaper publisher in Dallas, Texas, United States

== Places ==
- Belo, Cameroon, a town and commune in Cameroon
- Belo, Brda, a small settlement in the Littoral region of Slovenia
- Belo, Medvode, a small settlement in Medvode, Slovenia
- Belo, Šmarje pri Jelšah, a settlement near Šmarje, Slovenia
- Belo, West Virginia, an unincorporated community in Mingo County, West Virginia, USA
- Belo sur Mer, a town and commune in Madagascar
- Fajã do Belo, a permanent debris field on São Jorge, the Azores, Portugal
- Belo, Croatia, a village near Delnice

== People ==
- Alfred Horatio Belo (1839–1901), founder of The Dallas Morning News newspaper
- Ana Paula Belo (born 1987), Brazilian handball playmaker
- António Mendes Belo (1842–1929), Portuguese cardinal
- Belo, Brazilian singer, real name Marcelo Pires Vieira
- Brian Belo (born 1987), British entertainer
- Carlos Filipe Ximenes Belo (born 1948), Roman Catholic bishop who received, together with José Ramos-Horta, the 1996 Nobel Peace Prize
- Felipe dal Belo (born 1984), Brazilian football defender
- João Pedro Belo (1910–?), Portuguese football defender
- Julia Freitas Belo (born 1997), East Timorese football forward
- Mac Belo (born 1993), Filipino basketball player
- Mahalia Belo, British director
- Roseli de Belo (born 1969), Brazilian football forward
- Ruy Belo (1933–1978), Portuguese poet and essayist
- Sergei Belo (born 1970), 2011 coach for the Israel men's national ice hockey team
- Vicki Belo (born 1956), Filipino cosmetic surgeon
- BélO (Jean Bélony Murat, born 1979), Haitian musician
- Belo Cipriani (born 1980), American writer
- Belo Zero (born 1972), American rapper

== Other ==
- Alfred Horatio Belo House, a historic mansion in Dallas, Texas, USA
- Belo Garden Park, a public park in Dallas, Texas, USA
- João Belo-class frigate, a class of ships for the Portuguese navy

== See also ==
- Belo Horizonte, a city in Brazil
