= Belu, Iran =

Belu (Persian: بلو) in Iran may refer to:

- Belu, Kurdistan
- Belu, West Azerbaijan
