= Alfred Horatio Belo =

American newspaper founder (1839–1901)

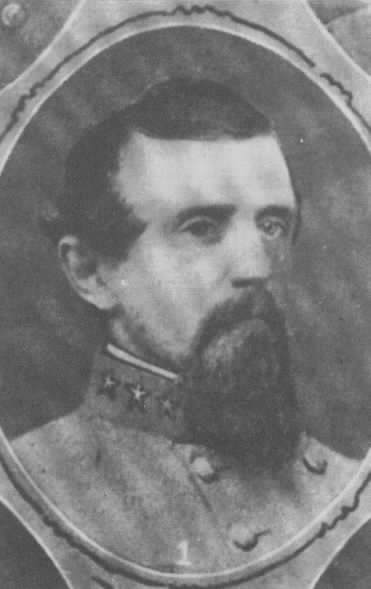
- Born: May 27, 1839; Salem, North Carolina
- Died: April 19, 1901 (aged 61); Asheville, North Carolina
- Burial place: Salem Cemetery, Winston-Salem, North Carolina
- Military career
- Allegiance: Confederate States of America
- Branch: Confederate States Army
- Service years: 1861–65
- Rank: Colonel
- Commands: 55th North Carolina
- Conflicts: American Civil War
- Other work: Founder of The Dallas Morning News

Alfred Horatio Belo (May 27, 1839 – April 19, 1901) was the founder of The Dallas Morning News newspaper in Dallas, Texas, along with business partner George Bannerman Dealey. The company A. H. Belo Corporation, owner of The Dallas Morning News, was named in his honor.

== Early life ==
Belo was born in Salem, North Carolina, in May 1839. He was highly educated from an early age.

During the American Civil War, Belo fought for the Confederacy. He was a colonel in the Confederate States Army and commanded the 55th North Carolina Infantry Regiment. He was wounded in the Battle of Gettysburg and then again in the Battle of Cold Harbor.

Alfred’s father was Edwin Belo. In his younger years Alfred attended Bingham School. After that, he graduated from the University of North Carolina. Later Belo became a captain assigned to the 55th North Carolina Infantry. He fought multiple battles with Robert E Lee's army, and for his role in the Battle of Manassas he was promoted to major. Belo became a lieutenant colonel soon after. After becoming a lieutenant colonel, Belo fought in the battle of Gettysburg in July 1863. During the battle, Belo was severely wounded. He also received a serious injury at the battle of Cold Harbor a year later. This time his left arm was shattered.

== Business life ==
At the end of the Civil War, Belo moved to the Houston area in search of job opportunities. He met newspaperman Willard Richardson, who had replaced Samuel Bangs as publisher of the fledgling (circulation 200) Daily News of Galveston.

Belo eventually succeeded Richardson as publisher, becoming majority owner of the company in 1865. In 1881, Belo incorporated the Galveston Daily News.

== The Dallas Morning News ==
Belo expanded the Daily News by starting a new newspaper in 1885 under the recommendation of George Bannerman Dealey, who Belo had hired as an office boy in 1874. The Dallas Morning News published its first edition in what was then the prairie town of Dallas, population 18,000.

The Dallas Morning News under Belo continued Richardson's embrace of the innovation of the day—telephony and railroads. It used the telegraph to communicate across 315 miles such that the Galveston Daily News and The Dallas Morning News could issue the first wire-connected publication with joint issues. It further established a train schedule to Fort Worth, Denison, and Waco to allow it to expand to a year-end circulation of 5,678 daily and 6,435 Sunday papers. From there it continued a steady growth in circulation.

In 1885, Belo sent George Bannerman Dealey to Dallas to help establish a sister newspaper in that city. Dealey had been working his way up in the company since 1874. He was given the title of business manager to oversee the creation of the newspaper (which formed the first newspaper chain.) The first edition was printed October 1, 1885. The building where the newspaper was headquartered made use of the city's first commercial electric lights.

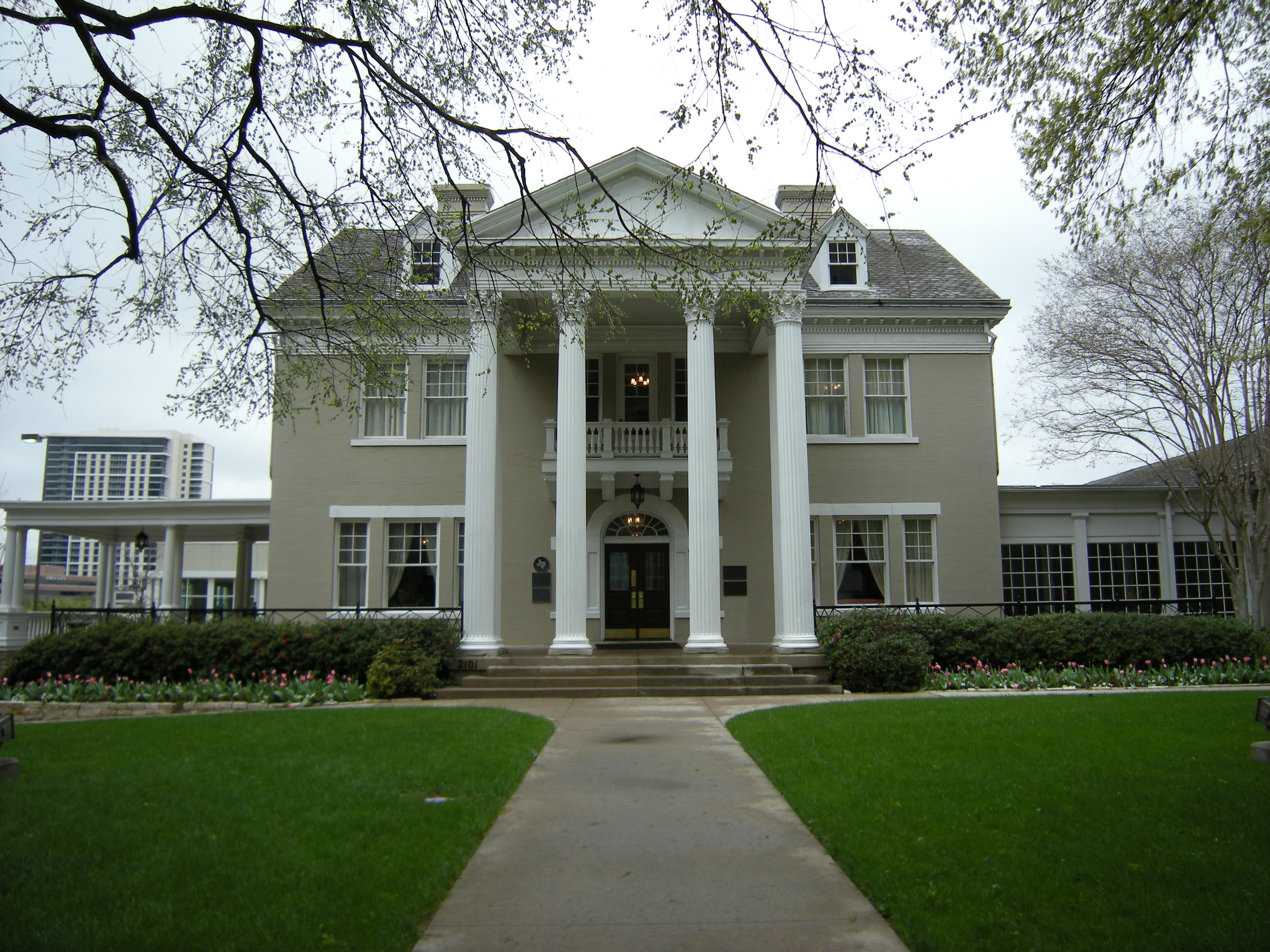
The Alfred Horatio Belo Mansion in Dallas, Texas

== Personal life ==
Belo married Nettie Ennis.

They had a son and a daughter, Alfred Horatio Belo, Jr., and Jeannette Belo. They built the Alfred Horatio Belo House in Dallas, Texas, one year before he died.

One of his children would become the next president of the Galveston News.

== Death ==
Belo died on April 19, 1901, in his family's summer home in Asheville, North Carolina. Belo had never fully recovered from his battle wounds and sought comfort and relief many months out of the year outside of Texas. He was buried near his hometown, Salem.

== Controversy ==
The company which owned The Dallas Morning News, the paper founded by Belo, removed its founder's name on June 29, 2021, after acknowledging Belo's Civil War past as an officer in the Confederacy. The change was proposed in 2021 by Robert W. Decherd, the company’s chairman, president and CEO, to embrace “the social justice movement underway in America.” The name change was approved with 99% of votes cast.
