= Bellow =

Bellow may refer to:

== People ==
- Adam Bellow, vice president/executive editor at Collins Books
- Alexandra Bellow (1935–2025), Romanian-American mathematician
- Bella Bellow (1945-1973), Togolese singer-songwriter
- Saul Bellow (1915–2005), American writer born in Canada of Russian-Jewish origin
  - PEN/Saul Bellow Award for Achievement in American Fiction, awarded biennially by the PEN American Center

== Other uses ==
- Bellow (album), the second album by folk duo Spiers and Boden
- Bellows, a device for controlled delivery of pressurized air.
- Bellow's Regiment of Militia, also known as the 16th New Hampshire Militia Regiment
- Bellow Island, an island in Lake Michigan
- Vociferation

== See also ==
- Bello (disambiguation)
- Bellows (disambiguation)
