= HSwMS Belos =

Several ships of the Swedish Navy have been named HSwMS Belos, named after the mythological king of Egypt:

- HSwMS Belos (1885) was a submarine rescue ship launched in 1885 and decommissioned in the 1960s
- HSwMS Belos (1961) was a submarine rescue ship launched in 1961 and decommissioned in 1993
- HSwMS Belos (A214) is a submarine rescue ship launched in 1985 and commissioned in 1992
