= Quema House =

Ancestral house in Ilocos Sur, Philippines

Coordinates: 17°34′12″N 120°23′22″E

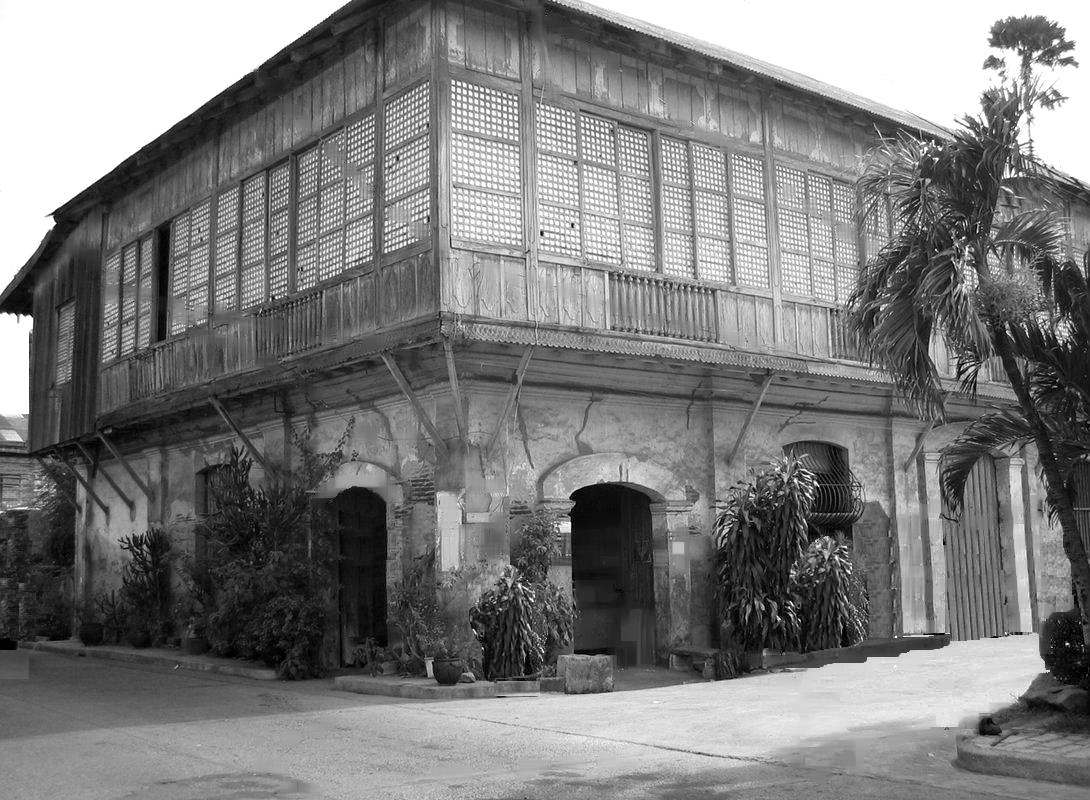
Quema house before renovations

The Quema House is the ancestral home of the Quema family in the Philippines. Built in the 1820s, it is a historic landmark in the city of Vigan, Ilocos Sur in the Philippines. The city itself was declared a UNESCO World Heritage Site in 1999.

== History ==
In pre-Hispanic times up to the early 16th century, Vigan was a major commercial center in the region, trading directly with China. This commerce resulted to Chinese migration into the area with subsequent intermarriage between the native inhabitants and the Chinese immigrants. During the Spanish colonial period (1521-1898), Vigan became an important supplier of goods for the Manila-Acapulco galleon trade, which led to the rise of a new merchant class whose members are of mixed Chinese, native and Spanish ancestry - the Filipino mestizos. With their increasing affluence, they built their residential houses (bahay-na-bato) in the eastern district of the town, previously the Kasanglayan or old Chinese quarters. It is here that Chinese trader Don Enrique Quema built his ancestral house in the early 19th century.

== Style ==
The Quema House portrays the design of a typical Bahay na Bato (literally, "house of stone") popular among the mestizo class. The roof has a steep pitch suggestive of traditional Chinese architecture. The ground floor was used as storage and as a garage for horse-drawn carriages, while the living quarters were housed in the upper floor. The exterior walls of the upper storey are enclosed by wood-framed, sliding window panels of kapis shells (Placuna placenta, a thin-shelled oyster). All throughout the living quarters are wide plank hardwood floors.

=== Philippine Nationality Room ===
In 2009, the Filipino American Association of Pittsburgh (FAAP) chose the Quema House as the model for the design of a Philippine Nationality Room (PNR) at the Cathedral of Learning in the University of Pittsburgh (Pennsylvania, USA). The house was adjudged as most representative of 18th-century architecture unique to the Philippines, a requirement for a Nationality Room. As of 2021, there are 31 Nationality Rooms in the Cathedral of Learning, all representing 18th-century architecture of different countries. The Philippine Nationality Room functions as a regular classroom for Humanities classes. The room was constructed in early 2019 and dedicated on June 9, 2019.

== The house today ==
The Quema House today is still owned and maintained by the Quema family. Private tours are usually arranged upon request.

== Gallery ==
Interior of the Quema House

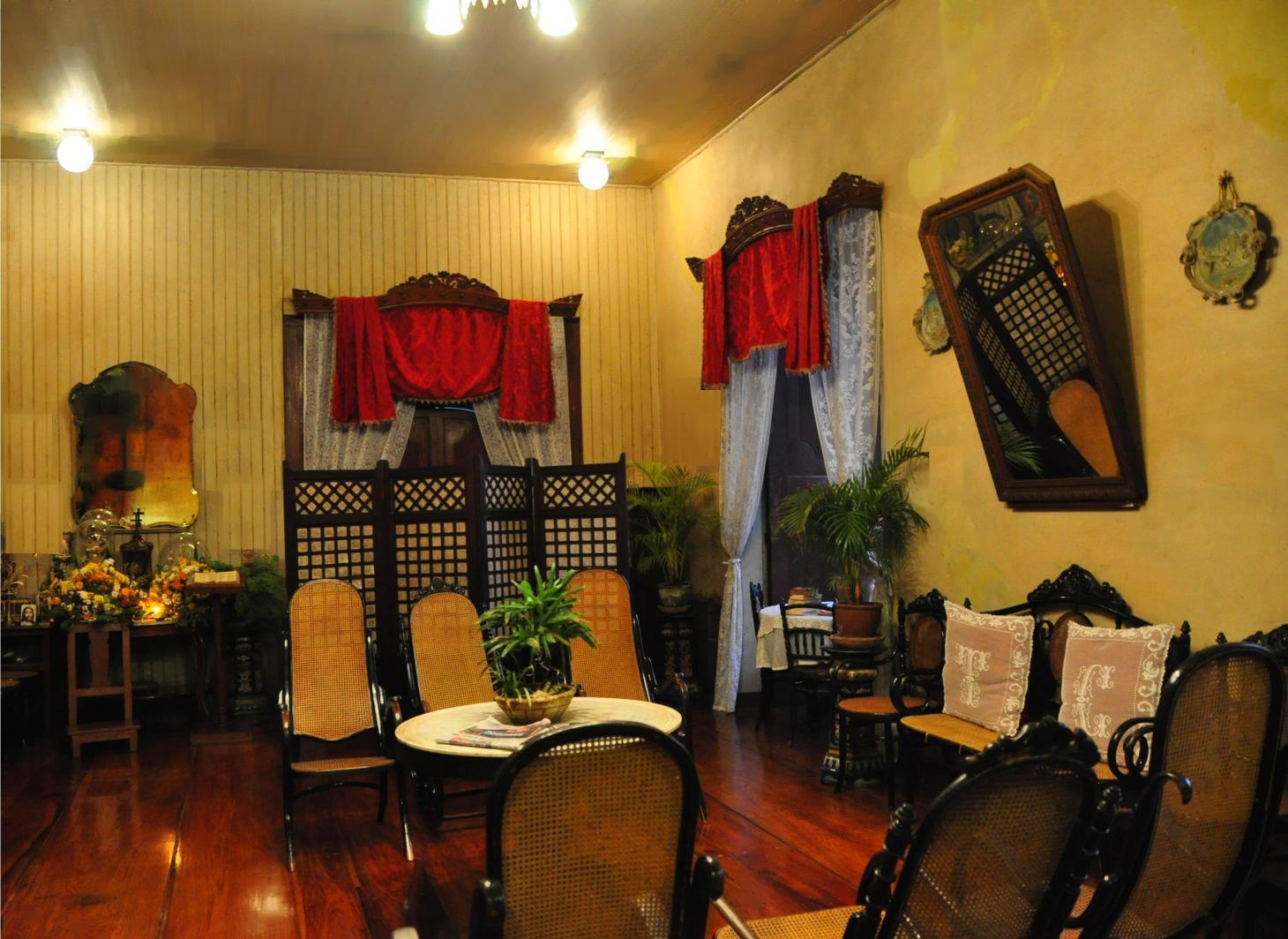
Sala de estar or living area

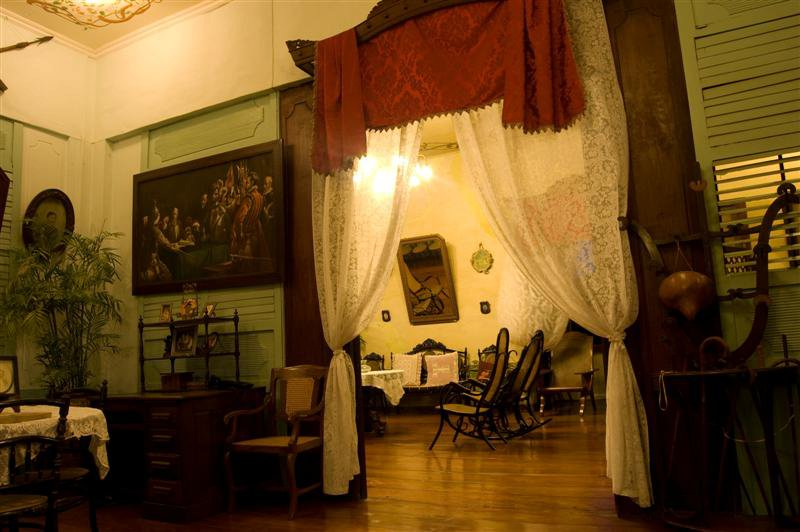
Secondary living area

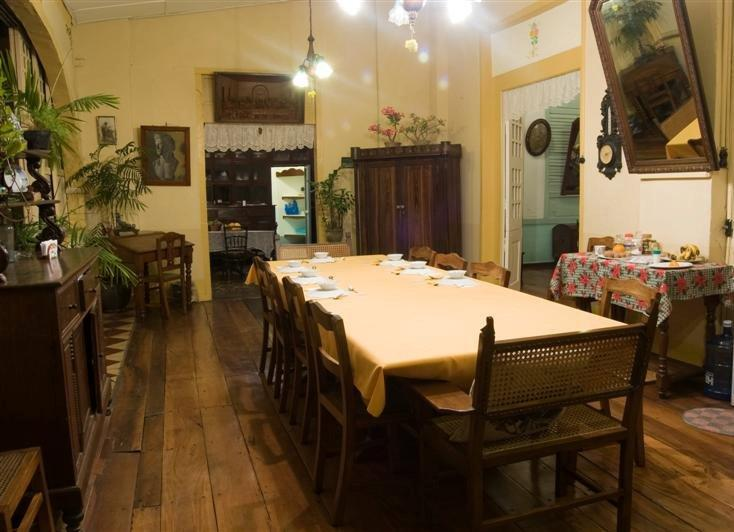
Comedor or dining area

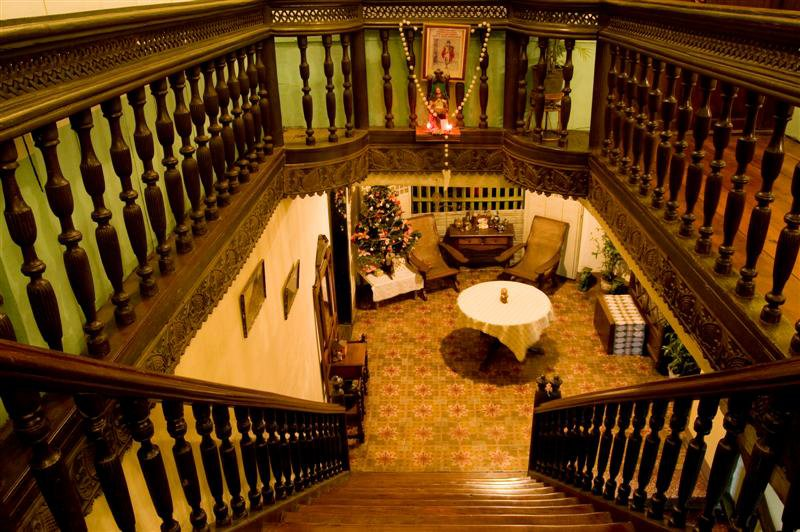
Grand balustrade

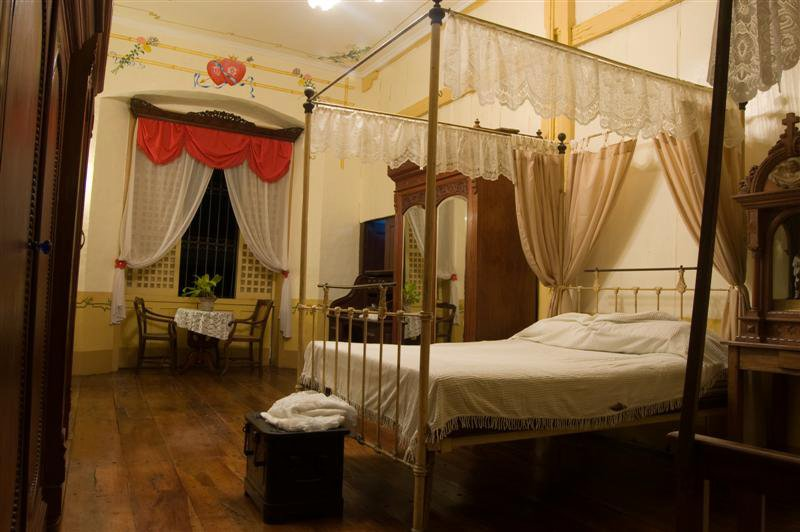
Dormitorio or bedroom
