= Andre Bellos =

American actor, singer and dancer

Andre Bellos (born August 13, 1987) is an American actor, singer and dancer who has appeared in the Spike Lee film Chi-Raq and Lee Daniels' television series Empire.

In 2009 he signed a digital distribution deal with Nimbit music and five years later with Georgia-based model/talent agency Babes'n'Beaus. On July 8, 2016, he released his newest song, "Explode" debuting it live on Fox's Good Day Chicago.

His break out acting role comes as state attorney investigator Billy Coburn on Dick Wolf's NBC drama Chicago Justice.
