= Dagger (ornament) =

Decorative pattern used in architecture

Schematic position of the dagger (soufflet) and mouchette within a rose window element (western rose window of Lyon Cathedral, known as the "Lamb" rose).

The dagger motif, also known as a soufflet in French, is a decorative pattern used in architecture from the 14th to the 16th century as an openwork design in window grilles and balustrades, as well as in bas-relief on woodwork and exterior walls. It is a figure with symmetrical contours, unlike the mouchette, with which it is often associated.

== Definition ==
A dagger is a geometric motif shaped like an "acute ellipse, serrated on the intrados and straight," which appeared in the decoration of Gothic windows in the 14th century. It shares the same characteristics as the mouchette, except that the latter’s curves are asymmetrical, appearing twisted like those of a flame. It is formed of curves and counter-curves that converge in a spearhead shape on one side of the figure, with the other end being more rounded, or on both sides. Within this pattern, two serrations connect two motifs of different sizes with curvilinear shapes and more or less pronounced rounded edges that face each other. The assembly consisting of daggers, mullions, and other elements is structured by the tracery and generally forms either the upper part of a lancet window—known as a "network"—or a rose window.

== History ==
The dagger first appeared at the beginning of the 14th century, between 1300 and 1310, together with the mouchette in the window tracery of the English Curvilinear Gothic style, where both motifs became widespread after 1320. For example, they appear in the windows of the Lady Chapel of St Albans Cathedral, dating from 1308 or shortly thereafter.

In France, the motif appeared somewhat later, during the Flamboyant Gothic period, chiefly in the tracery—that is, the upper part of the window tracery of stained-glass windows—and in rose windows.

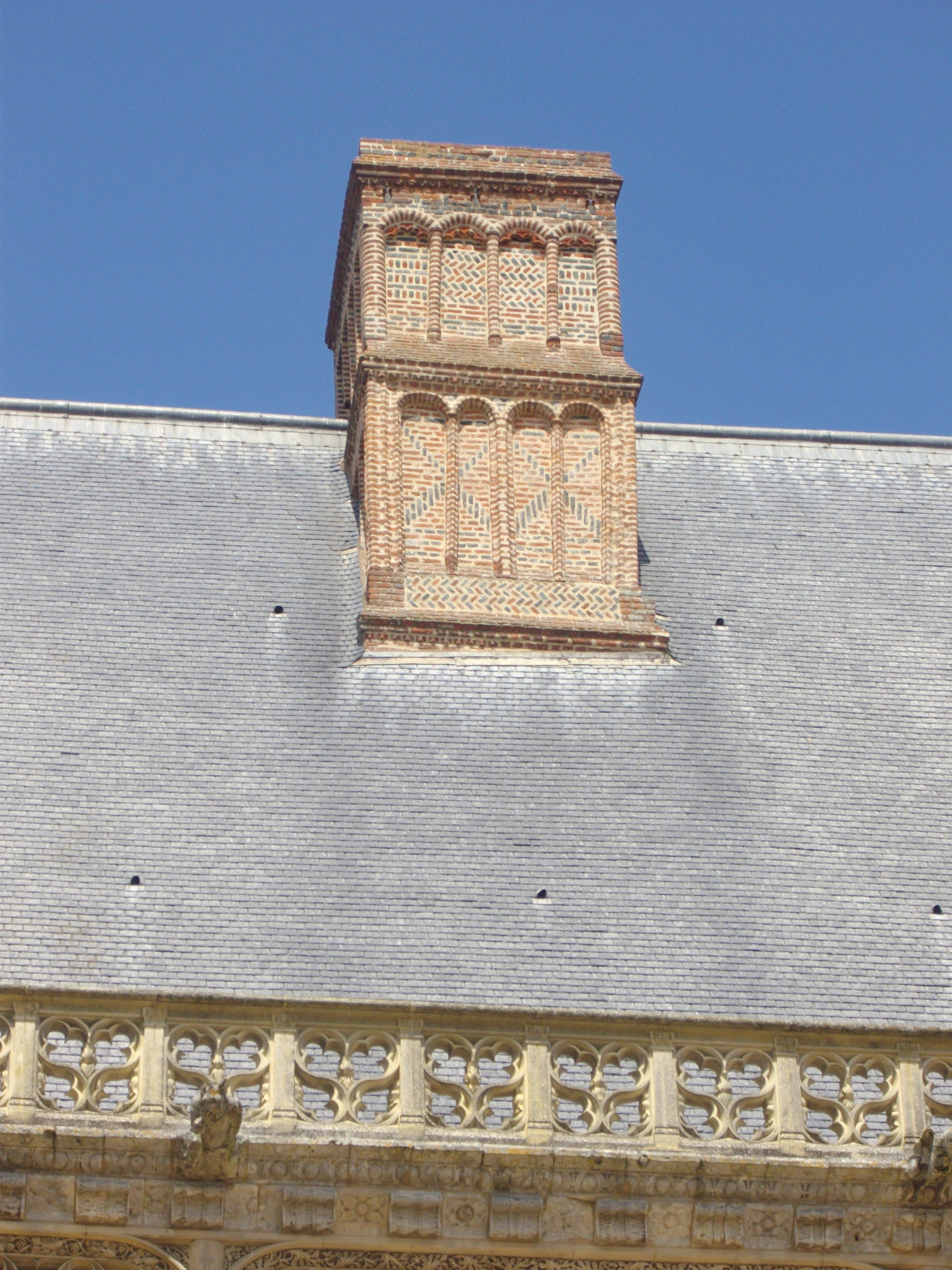
Soufflets arranged in inverted pairs of four in the balustrade of the Longueville wing of the Château de Châteaudun, early 16th century.

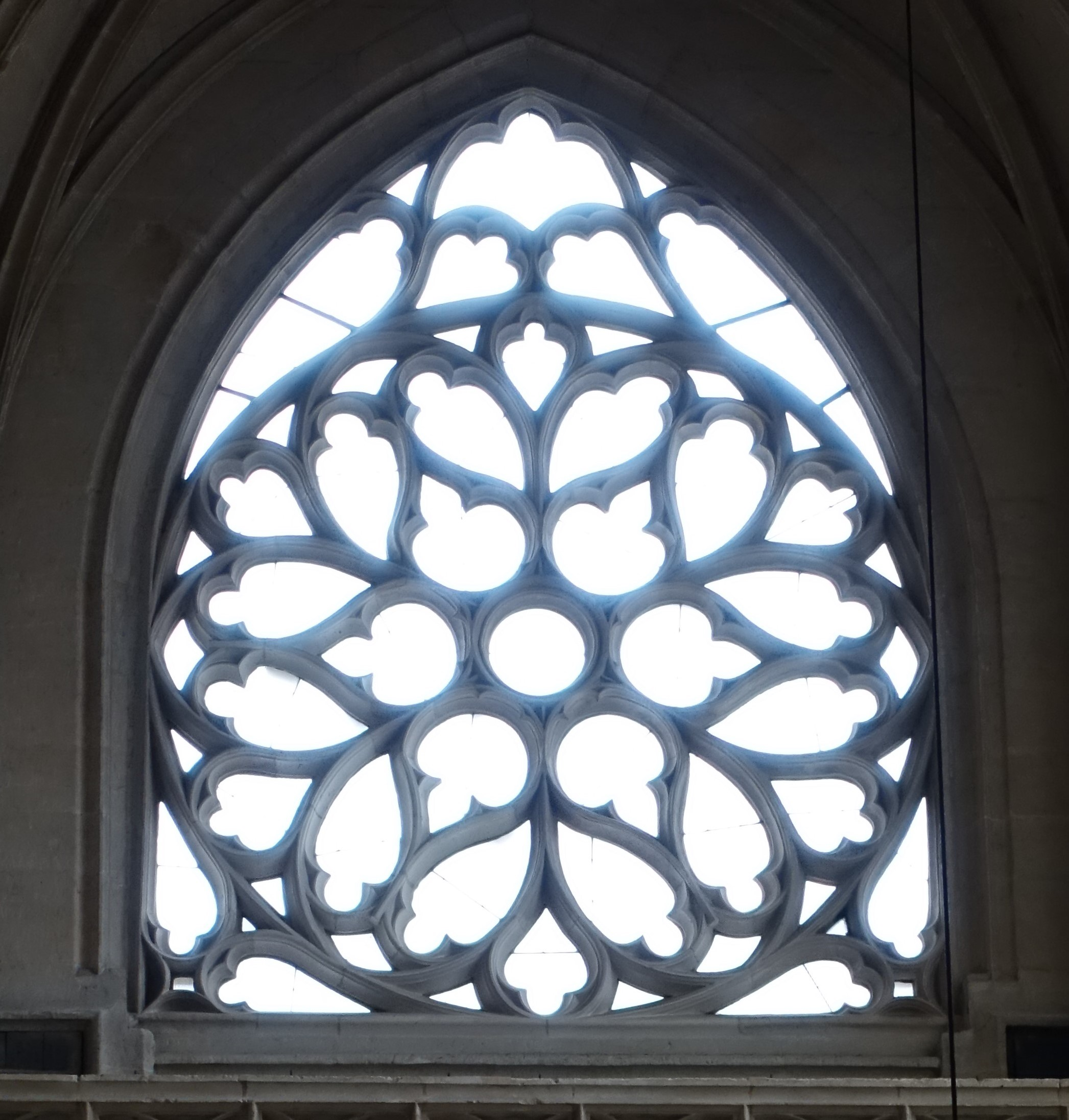
Twelve soufflets and twelve mouchettes in a 16th-century rose window.

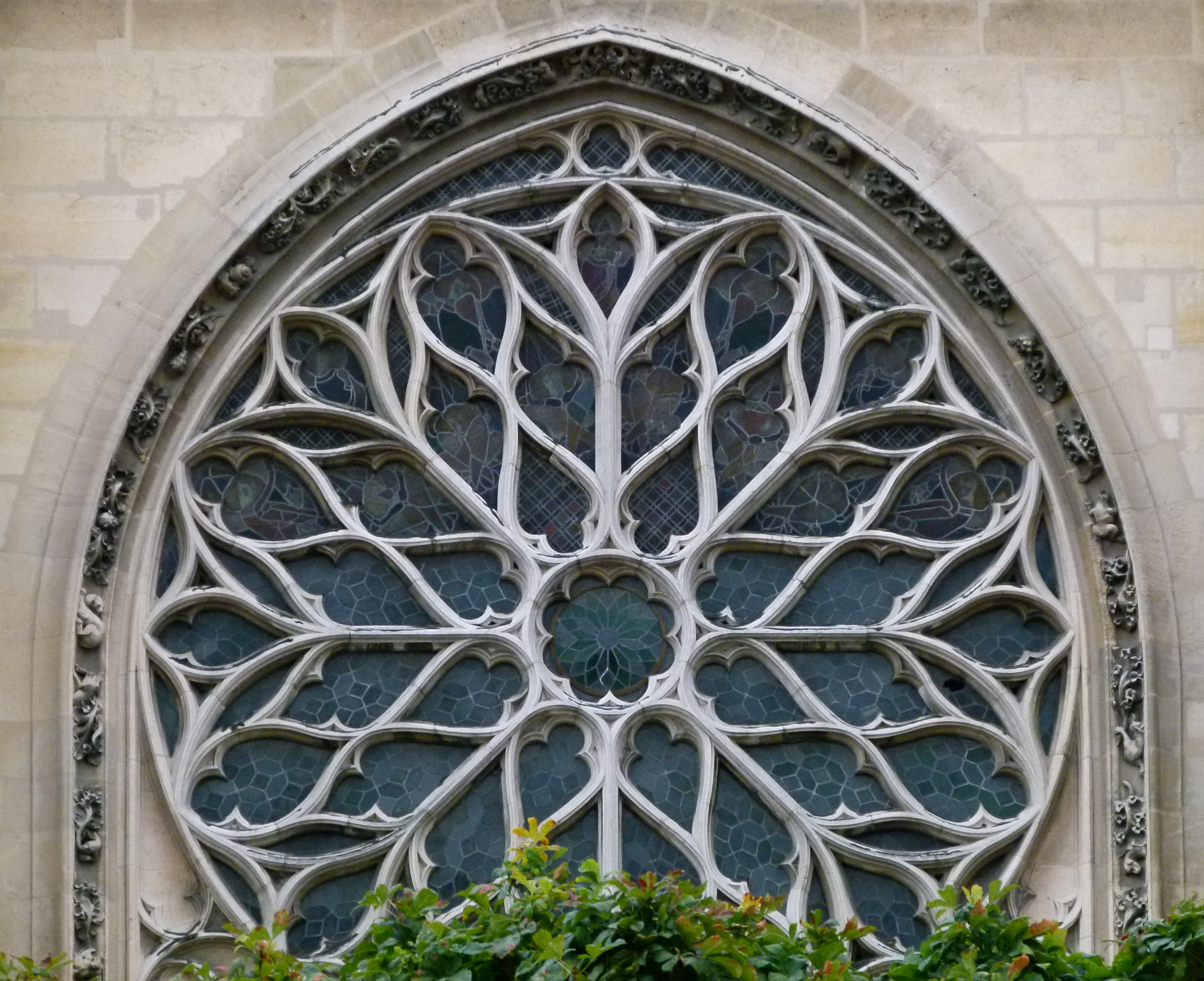
Three rows of inverted soufflets.

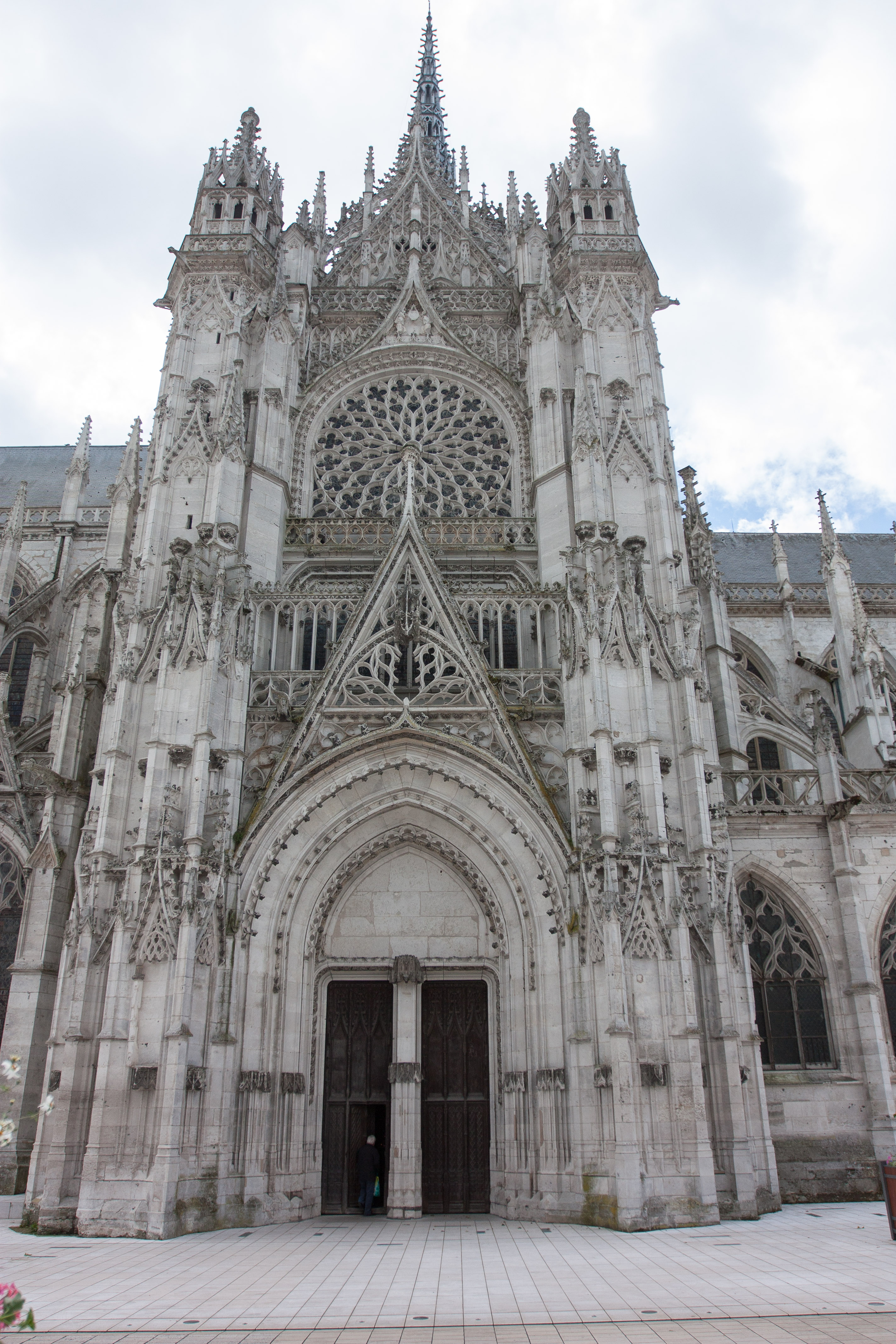
Numerous soufflets in the rose window, windows, portal gable and blind arcading of Évreux Cathedral, 16th century.

== Use ==
The dagger is also found as an openwork motif in tympana of portals and windows, and in balustrades, for example in triforia such as that of the transept of Nantes Cathedral. It is also carved in bas-relief, as in the north aisle of the 16th-century Évreux Cathedral, where it also appears individually in the balustrade of the gallery above the windows. It can also be seen in one of the flying buttresses of Amiens Cathedral, where it may have been added during a 19th-century restoration.

Associated with mouchettes and various other geometric figures, the dagger also appears on its own, either crowning trefoiled lancets or arranged in opposed pairs within balustrades.
