= Bruntsfield =

Area of Edinburgh, Scotland

Coordinates: 55°56′12.54″N 3°12′26.45″W

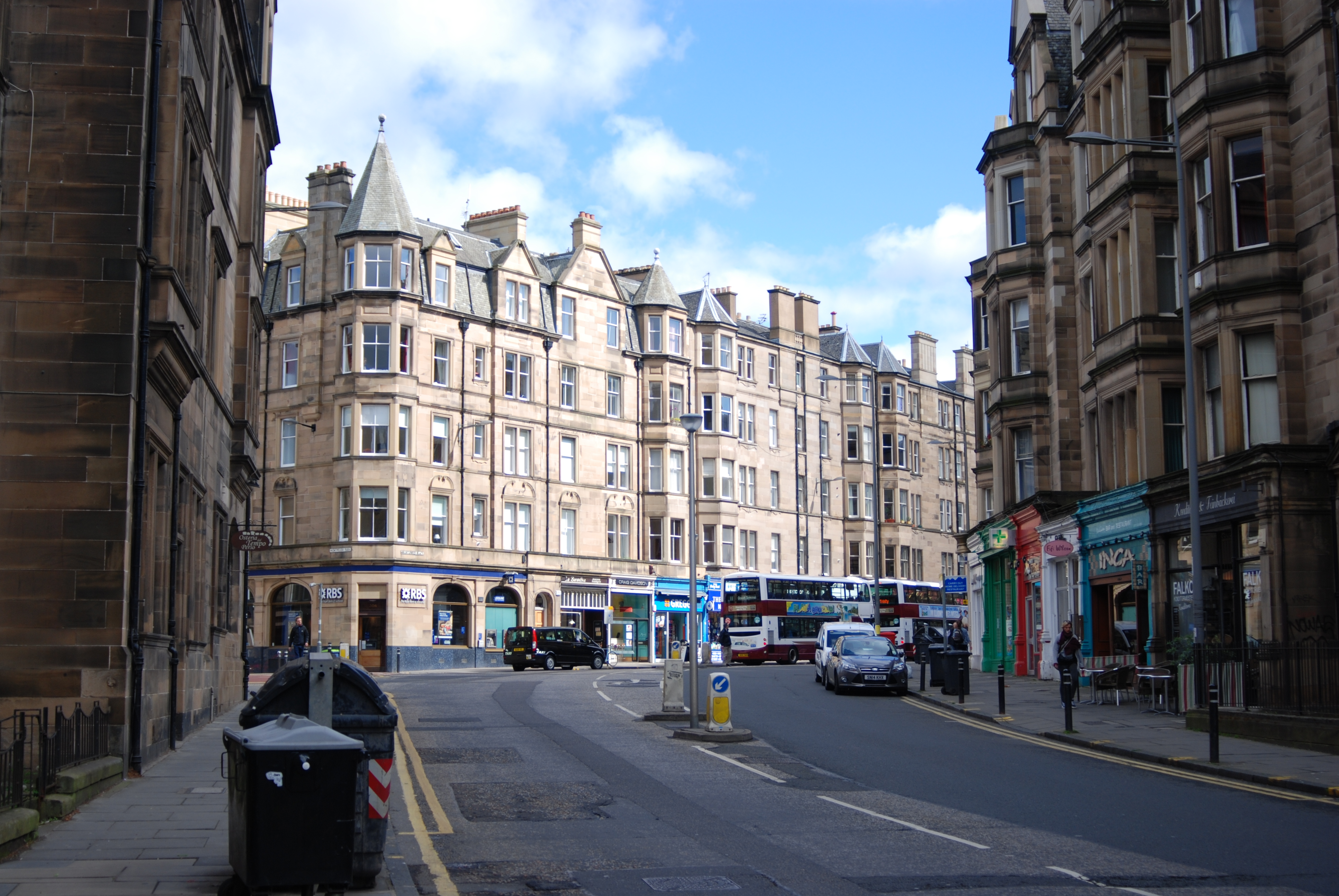
- Bruntsfield Place

- Location within the City of Edinburgh council area Location within Scotland
- OS grid reference: NT249718
- Council area: City of Edinburgh
- Lieutenancy area: Edinburgh
- Country: Scotland
- Sovereign state: United Kingdom
- Post town: EDINBURGH
- Postcode district: EH10
- Dialling code: 0131
- Police: Scotland
- Fire: Scottish
- Ambulance: Scottish
- UK Parliament: Edinburgh East Edinburgh South West Edinburgh South
- Scottish Parliament: Edinburgh Central Edinburgh Southern

Bruntsfield is a largely residential area around Bruntsfield Place in Southern Edinburgh, Scotland. In feudal times, it fell within the barony of Colinton.

== Location ==
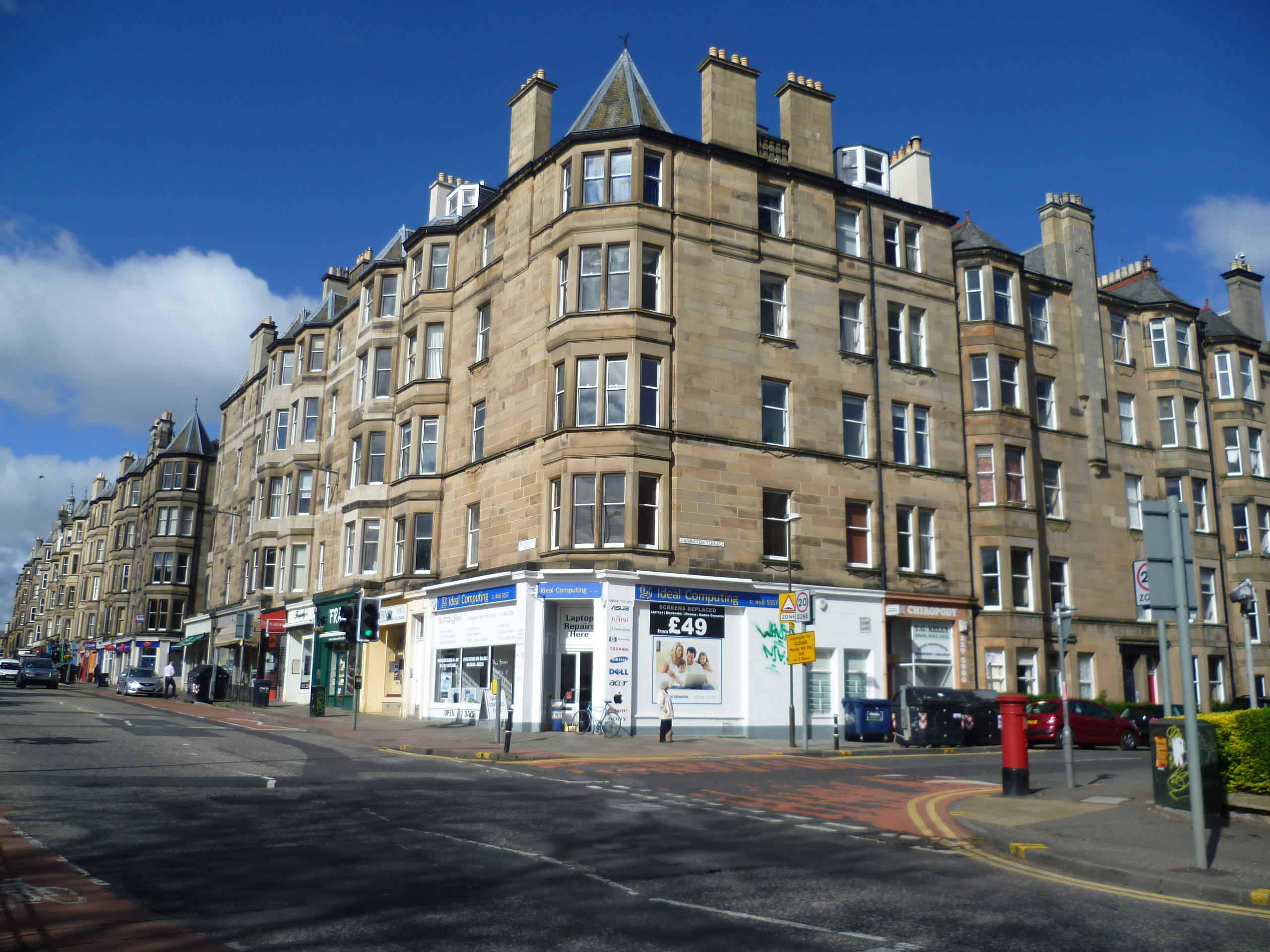
Tenements in Bruntsfield

Bruntsfield Place is less than 1 mile (1.6 km) south on the A702 main road from the West end of Edinburgh's principal street, Princes Street. The modern district of Bruntsfield lies west of Bruntsfield Links, beyond which lies the district of Marchmont. Merchiston is to the west and Tollcross to the north. To the south and east lies the former estate of Greenhill, and to the south Morningside. The estate built on land originally belonging to Bruntsfield House is called Marchmont, which the Warrender family began feuing in 1872. Many of the street names reflect the association with that family. The whole area lay within the Burgh Muir of Edinburgh, from which a former farm Burghmuirhead took its name which passed eventually to a small area within Bruntsfield. The Burgh Muir stretched all the way through from the present-day Meadows to the Braid Burn at the foot of the northern slopes of the Pentland Hills.

== History ==
The original name for the area was "Brounysfelde" or Brown's Fields, after the owner of Bruntsfield House, built on a pocket of land granted by the Crown within the Burgh Muir. A note in appendix 2 (number 1878) of the Great Seal of Scotland, 1306–1424, records a 1381 charter from the reign of Robert II which grants to William Lauder the lands of "Burrowmure in Edinburghshire", which had previously belonged to Richard Broun of Boroumore. He was the elder brother of Alan de Lawedre of the Haltoun House family, and in a further charter of the Great Seal of 4 June 1382, Alan succeeded his brother [fratrem dicti Alani] William de Lawedre in the lands of "Boroughmuir". It appears from subsequent charters that the Lauders acquired "Bruntisfield" at about the same time, unless it was all part and parcel of the 1381 acquisition. Sir Alexander Lauder of Blyth, Provost of Edinburgh, acquired from his father, Sir Alexander Lauder of Haltoun, Knt., in August 1497 "the lands of Brounisfeld, with the manor-house and gardens, park, herbarium, etc., except for one perticate of land at the east end, adjoining the ditch thereof, in the common muir of Edinburgh."

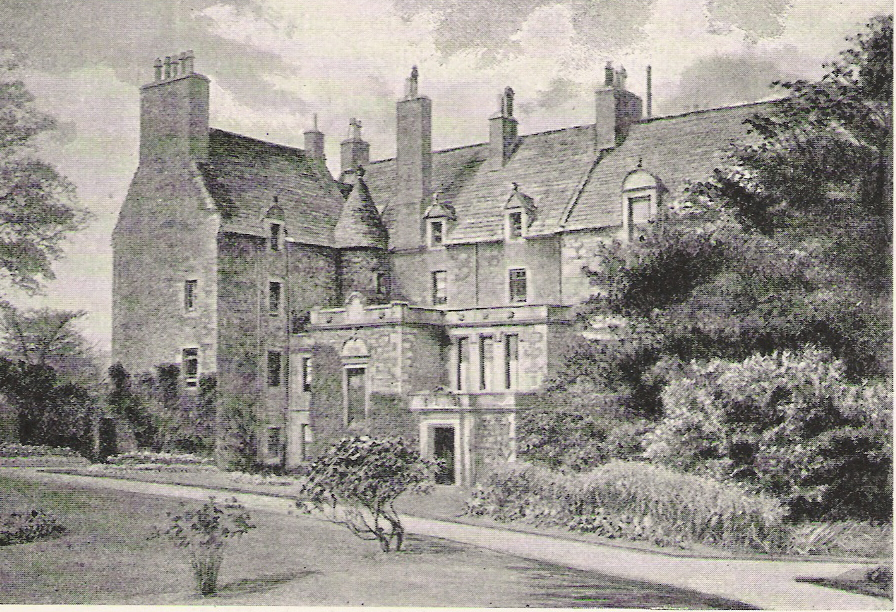
Bruntsfield House in 1897

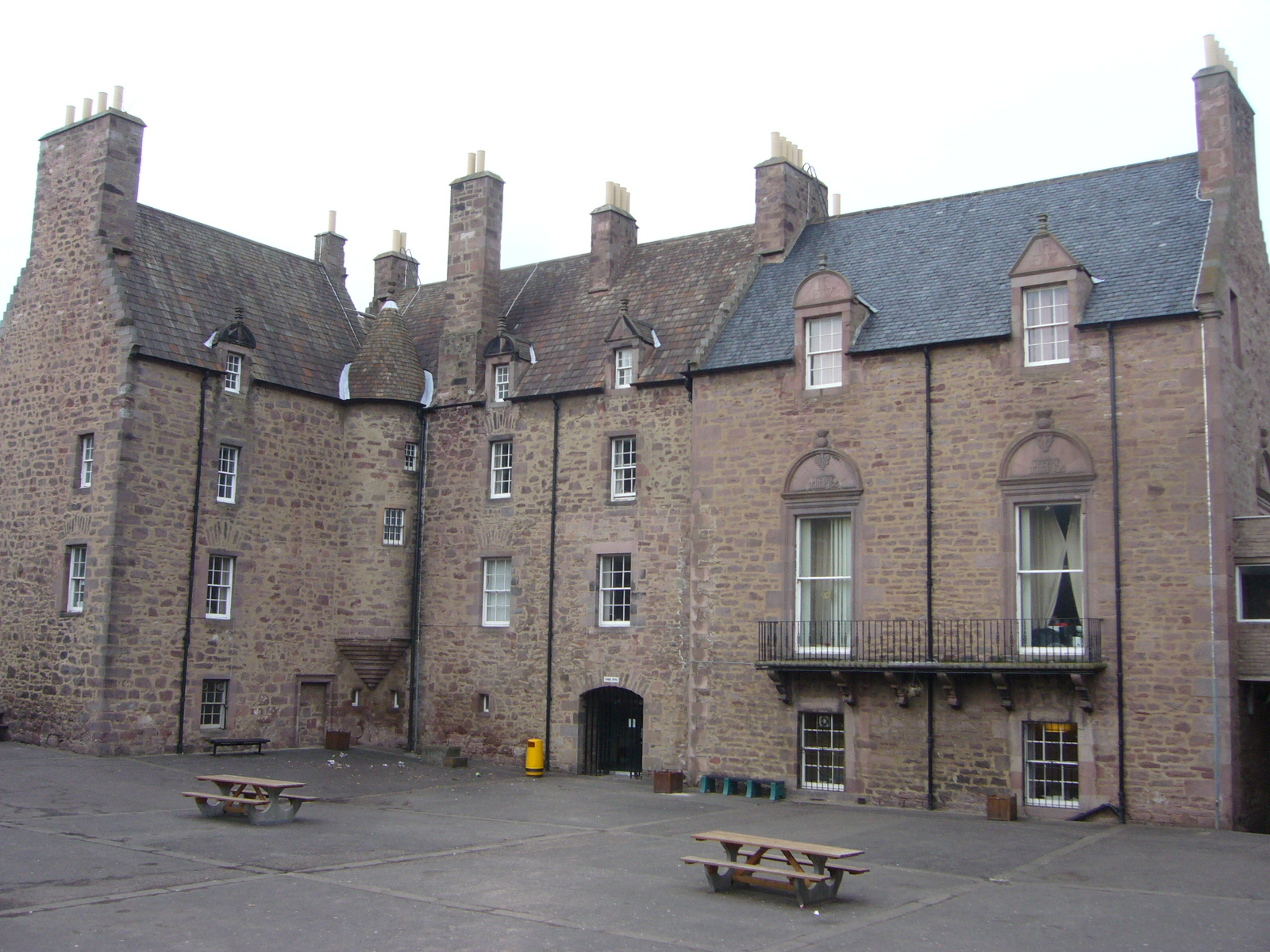
Bruntsfield House in 2009

J.Stewart-Smith states that "Bruntsfield Manor", or as it is known today, Bruntsfield House, had been the dower house of each successive bride of the Lauders of Haltoun for 226 years.

Sir William Lauder of Haltoun (d. Nov 1596) invested his son, Sir Alexander Lauder, Knt., younger of Haltoun and Sheriff Principal of Edinburgh, and his mother in life-rent in Bruntsfield in 1587, and they resided in Bruntsfield Manor, being then estranged from the laird of Haltoun. They significantly rebuilt the mansion house. In 1603 Sir Alexander Lauder sold it to John Fairlie of the family of Braid. Fairlie carried out extensive work to the original building, which is incorporated in the present mansion. His great-grandson, William Fairlie of Brounsfield, was still in possession after the reign of Mary, Queen of Scots. He sold Brounisfield to George Warrender of Lochend – then Baillie (councillor) and afterwards Lord Provost of Edinburgh – in July 1695, and that family were still in possession in 1900. Until just before the Second World War the Union flag flew regularly over the house whenever the family were in residence. By 1915 the feuing of the Bruntsfield Estate Marchmont was complete and no more than seven acres around the house remained in possession of the family. The carriage drive from Whitehouse Loan which swept round the now demolished Victorian wing and along the Lime Walk to the stables with their own entrance close to the twentieth century putting green. Bruntsfield House passed into Council ownership and since the 1970s has been incorporated into James Gillespie's High School as the school's main admin block. The house was categorised as a Listed Building by Historic Scotland in the early days of that agency.

Bruntsfield was home to other mansions, not least that of Wrychtishousis on a site adjacent to present-day Gillespie Crescent. It was replaced by Gillespie's Hospital, built 1803–1805. The site is now occupied by offices of the Royal Blind Asylum and apartments for the elderly run by the Viewpoint Housing Association.

One conspicuous building is the original Boroughmuir School (1905) at Viewpark off Whitehouse Loan, before that school moved to nearby Viewforth in 1914. The building then became James Gillespie's School for Girls until it was transformed into a new comprehensive school built on the grounds of Bruntsfield House in 1973. After serving as an annexe to a number of schools over the years, the Viewpark building has been recently converted into student residences.

== Housing ==
The housing is mostly in the form of relatively high-quality tenements, interspersed with some large villas. In 2006 Bruntsfield was brought into the "S2" (southern zone 2) controlled parking zone, making much of the roadside parking available only to residents paying Council Tax and purchasing a permit. Other bays are pay-and-display.

== Education ==
The area is served by Bruntsfield Primary School and formerly the nearby secondary, Boroughmuir High School. The school closed in 2018 and a new school built to the north near the Union Canal, with the original school being converted to flats.

James Gillespie's High School lies in the south of the district.

== Public transport ==
The area is served by a number of bus routes operated by Lothian Buses including the 11, 15, 16, 23, 36 & 45.

== Communications ==
Bruntsfield falls primarily within the EH10 postcode district, and most of the area's telephone dialling codes (within the Edinburgh 0131 area code) are 228, 229, 447, 477 or the newer 452 (introduced in the 1980s). 656 is also now used.

== Parks ==
Bruntsfield Links is home to a pitch and putt golf course which serves as a reminder that it was one of the earliest places where golf was played in the Edinburgh area. The Links continue north east to Melville Drive where they meet The Meadows, a park formed after the old Burgh Loch was finally drained in the 19th century. At the southern end of the links, near Bruntsfield House, a sunken area formed by a former quarry is known locally as Tumbler's Hollow.

== Retail ==
The area has several restaurants and numerous small shops, many of which are gift shops (a good example being the Pooh Bear shop and Scotland's longest established worker co-operative).

== Religion ==
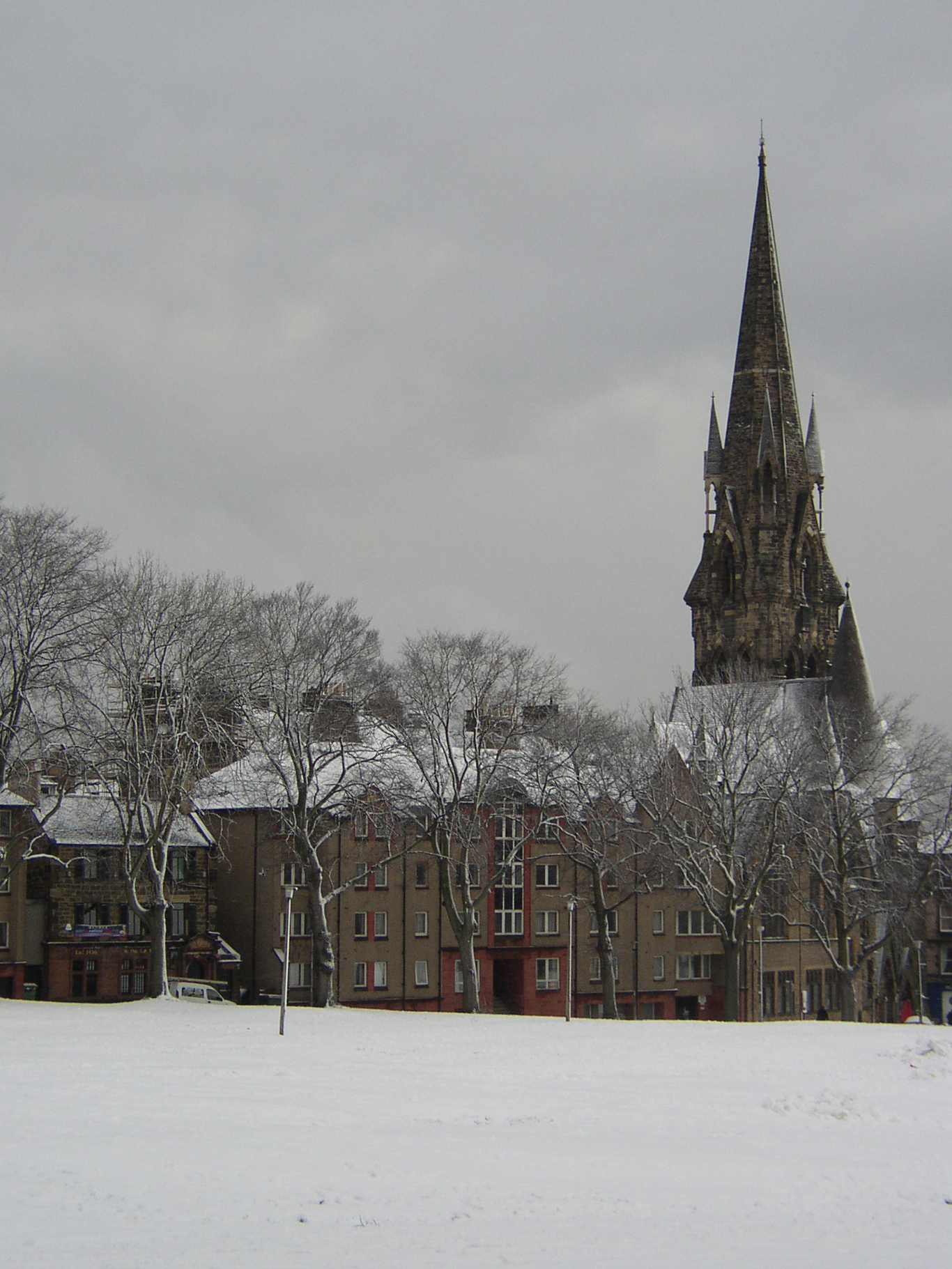
View of Barclay Viewforth Church across Bruntsfield Links

Bruntsfield falls in the Church of Scotland parishes of Barclay Viewforth Church and Morningside United Church. The junction where Bruntsfield meets Burghmuirhead on the road to Morningside is popularly known as "Holy Corner" from its cluster of Victorian churches.

== Bruntsfield in film and fiction ==
Because Muriel Spark, the author of the novel, was a Bruntsfield resident, one of the opening shots in the 1969 film The Prime of Miss Jean Brodie shows the title character setting out for school from her home at Admiral Terrace.

Bruntsfield is home to the character Isabel Dalhousie in The Sunday Philosophy Club series of books by Alexander McCall Smith which includes The Right Attitude to Rain and The Careful Use of Compliments. Isabel is a philosopher turned detective, who lives a "lady of leisure" lifestyle in a Bruntsfield townhouse. She frequents the quaint shops of the district, often visiting her niece who works in the local delicatessen.

== Notable people ==
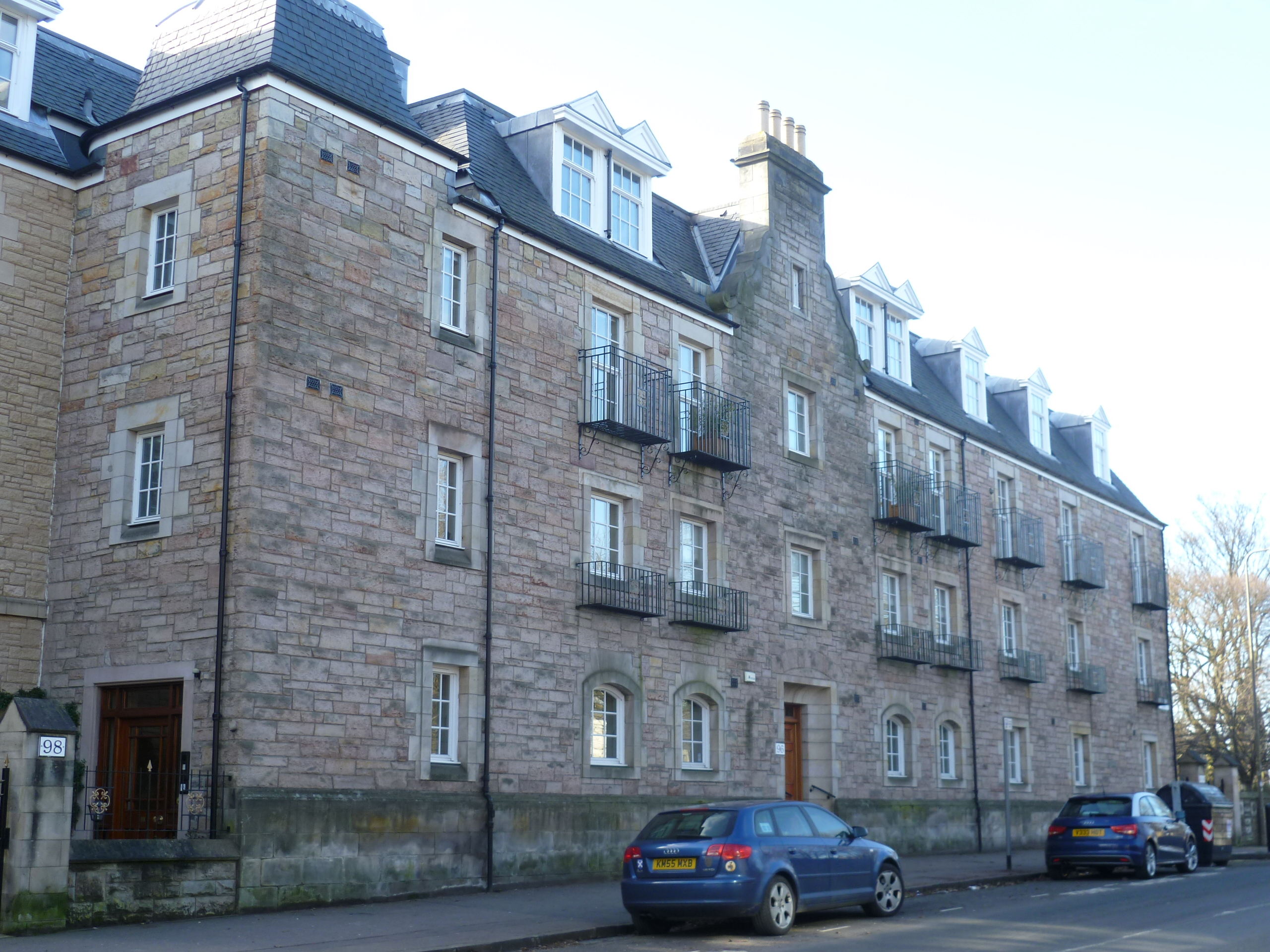
Sophia Jex-Blake's Bruntsfield Hospital, now converted to private apartments, 2010

Francis Moffat Hope (1877-1968), formerly of 18 Hartington Place, in 1910 became Actuary of Occidental Life Insurance Company in Los Angeles and remained until late 1960s.

- Anthony Walter Dayrell Brooke (1912 – 2011), Rajah whose grandson educated at Bruntsfield Primary School
- Chris Connelly (musician) (1964), author and musician
- William Craig (botanist) FRSE (1832-1922)
- Andrew Geddis (1886 – 1976), Bombay businessman
- Alison Grieve, CEO of Safetray Products Ltd (2009 – present)
- Sophia Jex-Blake, (1840 – 1912), English physician, teacher and feminist who established Bruntsfield Hospital for Women
- Alexander Lauder of Blyth, 1506 Great Seal of Scotland charter confirmed Bruntsfield to Alexander
- Chic Murray (1919 – 1985), Scottish comedian/actor who owned, with his wife Maidie, the eccentrically decorated Chic Murrays hotel in Bruntsfield Crescent, later renamed as the Nova Hotel and run by his wife Maidie and son Douglas until it was sold in the 1980s.
- Muriel Spark (1918 – 2006), award-winning Scottish novelist
