= Marchmont =

Area of Edinburgh, Scotland

Coordinates: 55.936540°N 3.1944412°W

Marchmont: Scottish Gaelic: Marc-Mhonadh
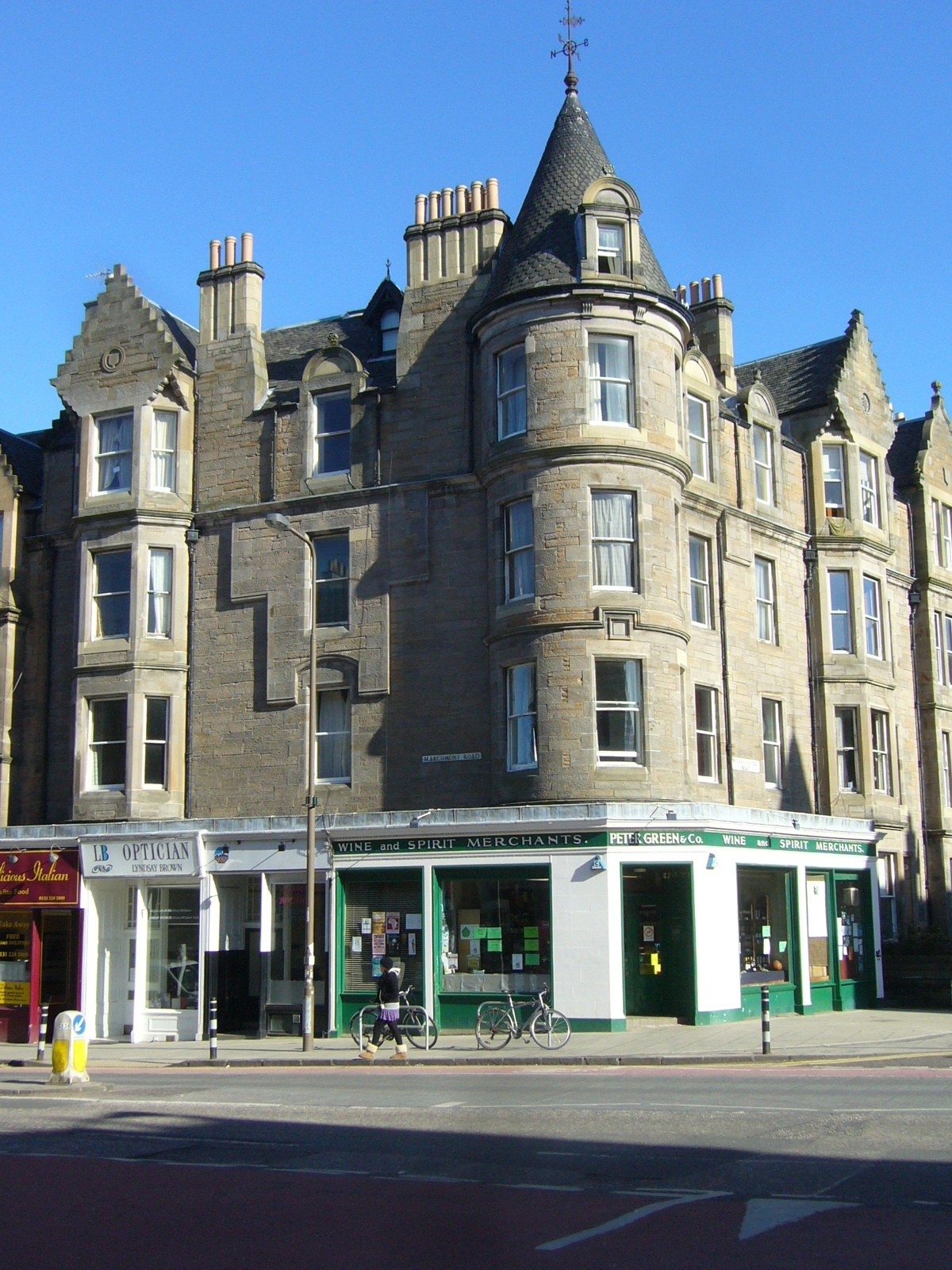
- Tenements with shops in Marchmont Road

- Location within the City of Edinburgh council area Location within Scotland
- OS grid reference: NT254721
- Council area: City of Edinburgh
- Country: Scotland
- Sovereign state: United Kingdom
- Post town: Edinburgh
- Postcode district: EH9
- Dialling code: 0131
- Police: Scotland
- Fire: Scottish
- Ambulance: Scottish
- UK Parliament: Edinburgh South
- Scottish Parliament: Edinburgh Southern

Marchmont (Scottish Gaelic: Marc-Mhonadh) is a mainly residential area of Edinburgh, Scotland. It lies roughly one mile (1.5 kilometres) south of the Old Town, separated from it by The Meadows and Bruntsfield Links. To the west it is bounded by Bruntsfield; to the south-southwest by Greenhill and then Morningside; to the south-southeast by The Grange; and to the east by Sciennes.

The area is characterised by four- and five-storey tenements blocks built in the Scots Baronial style. Most of the area was developed in the 1870s and 1880s and there has been little change to its structure since then. Marchmont remains popular with older residents, young professionals and students. In 1987, it was designated as a conservation area, the boundaries of which were extended in 1996 to include the Meadows, Bruntsfield Links and immediately surrounding streets.

== History ==
Marchmont was named after the 5th Earl of Marchmont, Hugh Hume Campbell, whose title in turn derives from the hill on which Roxburgh Castle was built. The name is Brittonic and probably means “the hill-pasture for horses”.

The area was developed as a planned middle-class suburb by Sir George Warrender (the son-in-law of Hugh Hume Campbell), who owned Bruntsfield House and the surrounding estate (which was also known as the Warrender Park) in the middle of the 19th century. This was at a time of rapid population growth in Edinburgh, stimulating a significant increase in the demand for housing. The original feuing plan laid out by architect David Bryce in 1869 called for mainly terraced villas, with a number of large, detached villas on Marchmont Road. However, this was superseded by a more comprehensive plan prepared by the firm of John Watherston & Sons. This proposed that all buildings were to be four- or five-storey tenements, some with commercial premises on the ground floor frontages.

Most of the buildings were completed in the 1870s and 1880s. The first tenements to go up were mostly in pink sandstone in the Scots Baronial style; these are by architects such as Edward Calvert. The later buildings, which were often in blonde sandstone and in a plainer, more uniform style, include works by Hippolyte Blanc, John Charles Hay and Thomas P. Marwick. Key buildings such as churches are mainly by the then city architect, Robert Morham.

Originally, the area was not allowed to have any premises selling alcohol, although that is no longer the case.

=== Street names ===
As was the usual practice at the time, the area's street names were derived from members of the developer's family or places associated with them. Sir George Warrender's wife, Helen, was the daughter of the 5th Earl of Marchmont, hence the name of the district. Thirlestane Street and Lauderdale Street were named in honour of Sir George's mother, who was the daughter of the Earl of Lauderdale and whose family seat was at Thirlestane Castle. Spottiswoode Street and Spottiswoode Road were named for John Spottiswoode, another Warrender relation, while Arden, as in Arden Street, was the family name of the Earl of Haddington, who married one of the Warrender daughters.

== Marchmont today ==
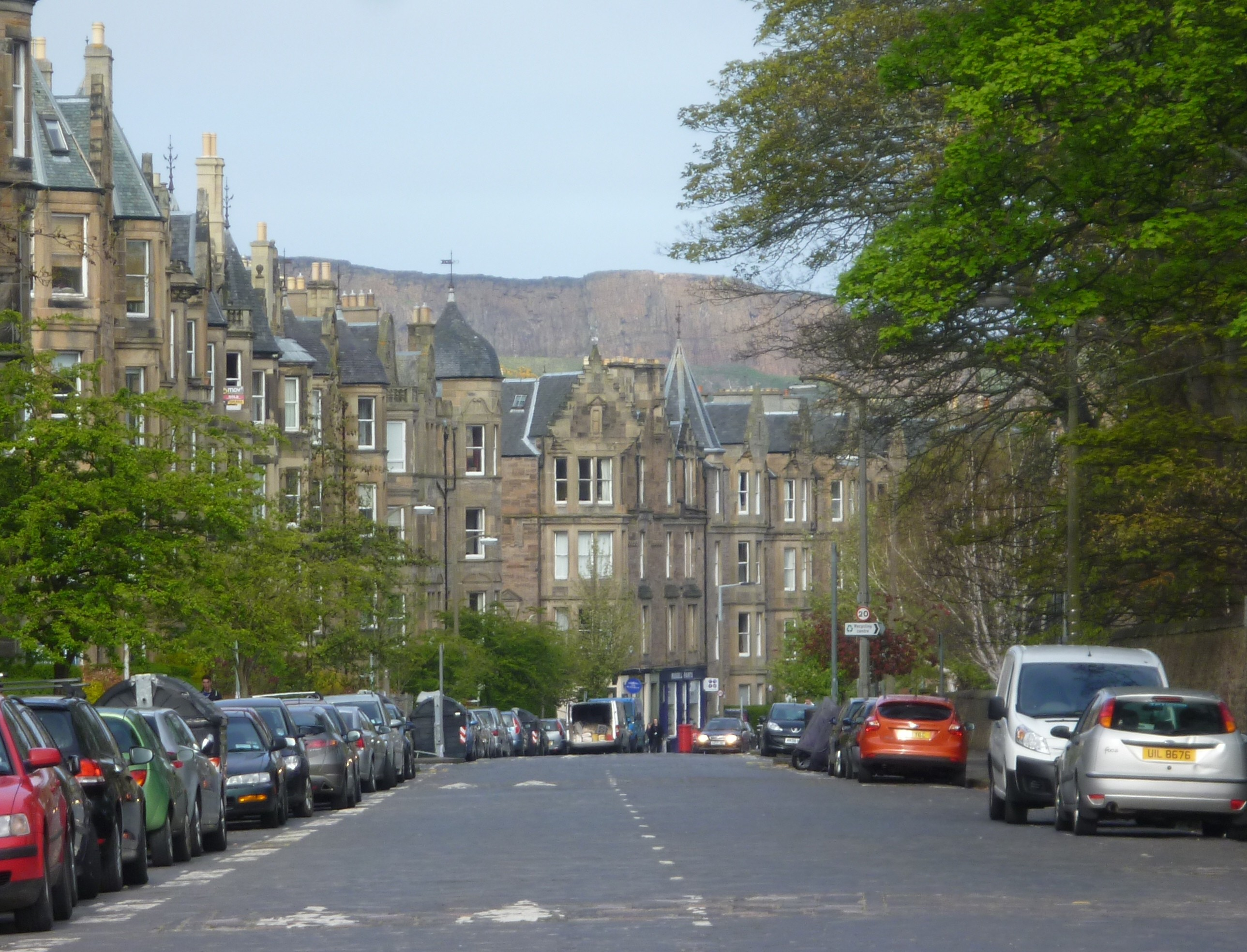
Warrender Park Road, Marchmont

Due to its proximity to the city centre and the presence of local amenities,Marchmont is considered a desirable location in which to live. This is reflected in its generally high property prices. It is popular with students, with both the University of Edinburgh and Edinburgh Napier University within easy walking distance, as well as with young professionals. This has resulted in a certain friction between permanent residents and temporary ones (many of whom are students), with the Marchmont Action Group Promoting Initiatives for the Environment (MAGPIE) unsuccessfully petitioning the Scottish Parliament in 2005 to impose quotas on shared accommodation by restricting the number of licences for Houses in Multiple Occupation (HMOs) granted for the area.

=== Sewer upgrade project ===
Between September 2022 and May 2025, Scottish Water undertook a sewer upgrade project in Marchmont, aimed at reducing the risk of flooding to properties in the neighbourhood by increasing the capacity of the sewer network, which is especially important during heavy rainfall. The project was delivered by their alliance partner Caledonia Water Alliance.

== Notable buildings ==
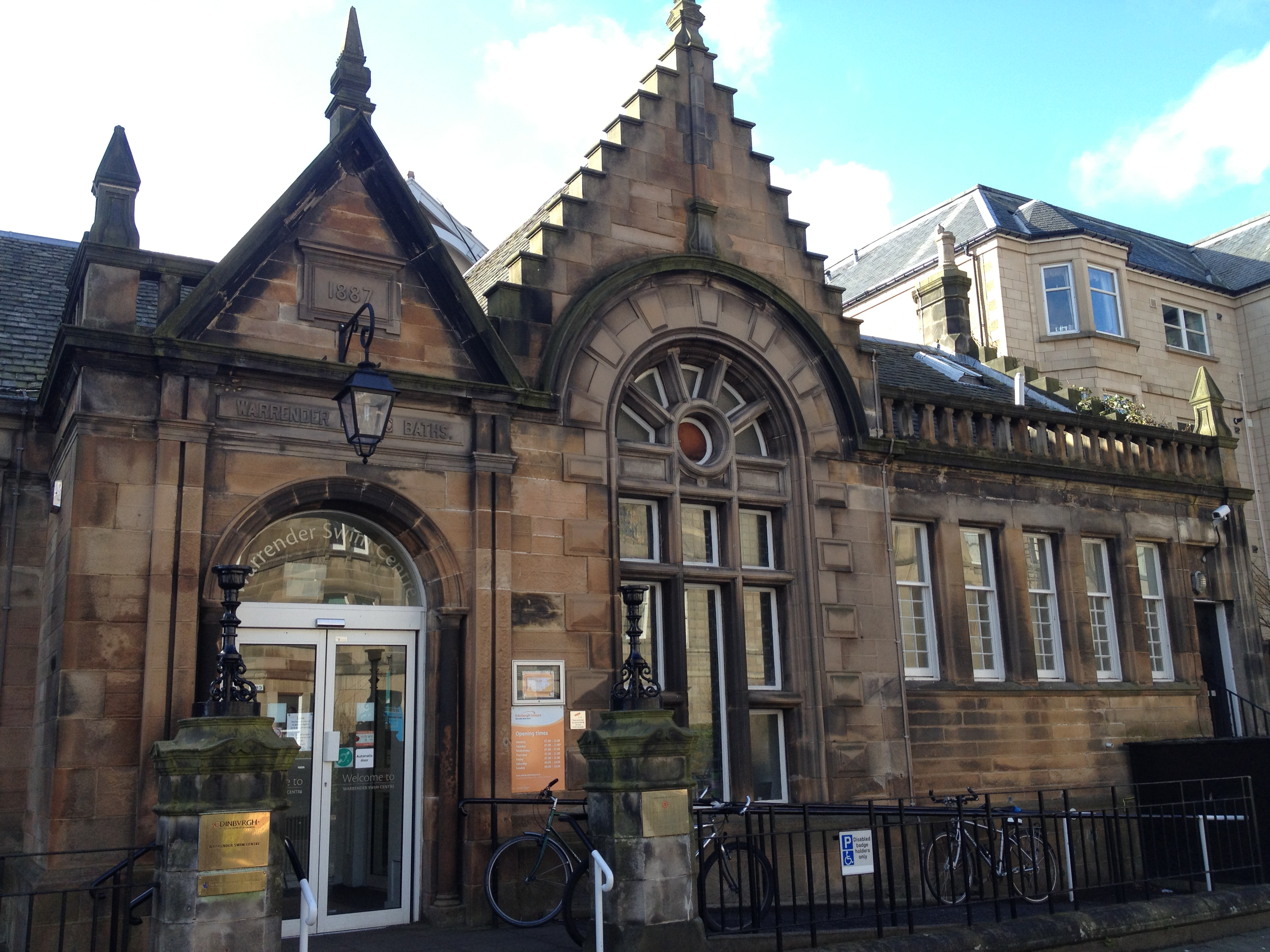
Warrender Baths

The Warrender Baths building in Thirlestane Road, was opened in 1887 on land donated by Sir George Warrender. It houses a swimming pool and a fitness complex. It is noted for its neo-Jacobean frontage, its mosaic tiling and its old-fashioned poolside changing facilities. The building is a Category B listed building.

Marchmont St Giles Church is situated to the immediate south of the area, at the north end of Kilgraston Road. It has been described as one of the most prominent landmarks of south Edinburgh. Designed by Robert Morham, it opened in 1871, replacing a previous iron building. On 1 January 2026, the church merged with Reid Memorial Church and is now known as Blackford and Grange Church.

James Gillespie's High School has occupied its present site between Lauderdale Street and Warrender Park Road since the 1960s. Most of the school buildings on the site were demolished in 2013 to make way for new premises which opened three years later. The site incorporates Sir George Warrender's original Bruntsfield House, which was refurbished as part of the building project.

The Gillis Centre is a group of buildings in Whitehouse Loan which has been occupied by the Catholic Church in Scotland since 1834. It includes a former chapel, convent and seminary, and since 1993 has served as offices for the Roman Catholic Archdiocese of St Andrews and Edinburgh. The chapel, which was designed by James Gillespie Graham is Category A listed; other parts of the site are B-listed. In May 2026, the church announced plans to put the entire site up for sale later that year; the sale was expected to take about two years to complete.

== Notable residents ==
- Ronnie Corbett (1930–2016), actor, broadcaster and comedian. During his childhood, he lived in a top-floor flat at 55 Marchmont Crescent.
- General Stanisław Maczek (1892–1994), World War II Polish tank commander who was instrumental in the Allied liberation of France. He lived at 16 Arden Street from 1948 until his death in 1994. A footpath on Bruntsfield Links is named in his honour.
- Callum Macdonald (1912–1999), publisher and editor of the literary magazine, Lines Review. After leaving the Royal Air Force in 1947, he and his wife settled in Marchmont, where they opened a small stationery and bookselling business.
- Ian Rankin, crime writer, best known for his Inspector Rebus novels. He lived in Arden Street before moving to Merchiston in 2003. Arden Street was also Rebus' own fictional home.
- J. K. Rowling, novelist and screen writer, best known for her Harry Potter books, lived briefly with her sister and brother-in-law in a flat at 140 Marchmont Road in 1993. A blue plaque marks the site.

== Marchmont in fiction ==
Arden Street is home to Ian Rankin's fictional Detective Inspector John Rebus.

In Muriel Spark's 1961 novel, The Prime of Miss Jean Brodie, the Marcia Blaine School for Girls is based on James Gillespie's High School. The title character is based on Christina Kay, a teacher at the school. Spark herself attended Gillespie's from 1923 to 1935.

Pat McGregor, a character in Alexander McCall Smith's 44 Scotland Street series, lives in Spottiswoode Street in the novel Love Over Scotland

== Bibliography ==
- Cant, Malcolm Marchmont in Edinburgh Edinburgh: J. Donald, 1984.
- Cant, Malcolm Marchmont, Sciennes and the Grange Edinburgh: Cant, 2001.
- Edinburgh Council – Marchmont, Meadows & Bruntsfield Conservation Area Appraisal, 2006, updated 2020
