= Edward Calvert =

Edward Calvert may refer to:

- Eddie Calvert (1922–1978), brass musician
- Edward Calvert (architect) (c. 1847–1914), Scottish domestic architect
- Edward Calvert (painter) (1799–1883), English printmaker and painter
