= Annie Hutton Numbers =

British chemist

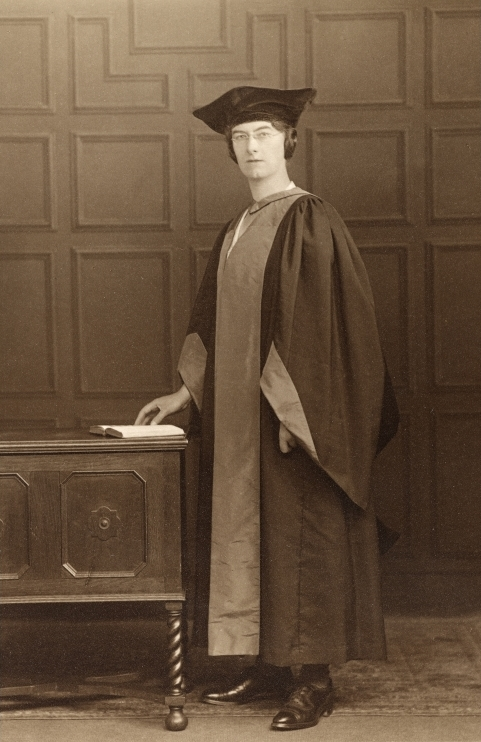
- Born: 6 March 1897; Edinburgh, Scotland
- Died: 10 April 1988 (aged 91); High Wycombe, Buckinghamshire
- Education: University of Edinburgh
- Occupation: chemist
- Employer: University of Edinburgh
- Known for: Chemistry

Annie Hutton Numbers (6 March 1897 – 10 April 1988) was a Scottish chemist and academic.

== Early life ==
Numbers was born on 6 March 1897 in Edinburgh to Maggie and Alexander Numbers. Her father was a joiner and cabinetmaker. She had one sister, Isabella, who was born about 1899. She attended Mrs Steele's Private School in Upper Gray Street in Edinburgh, then joined James Gillespie's High School in 1904, spending three years there. In 1907 she began her secondary education at Mary Erskine's Edinburgh Ladies' College until 1914.

== Education ==
She attended the University of Edinburgh graduating in 1918 with the degrees of MA (Hons) in mathematics and natural philosophy, and in 1920, with a BSc in chemistry.

== Career ==
Numbers joined the Department of Chemistry of the University of Edinburgh as an Assistant Lecturer where she worked on her doctorate. Her PhD thesis was entitled The Influence of Substituents on the Optical Rotatory Power of Compounds which she was awarded in 1926. The same year she published a paper with Harold Gordon Rule that was presented at the Chemical Society.

After four years she started a teaching job in Ipswich and later she worked in High Wycombe.

== Death ==
She retired in 1965 and died on 10 April 1988 (aged 91) in High Wycombe, Buckinghamshire.
