= Stuart Harris (architect) =

Scottish architect and historian

Stuart Lowe Harris (16 May 1920 – 24 February 1997) was a Scottish architect and historian. He worked for 34 years in the Architects Department of Edinburgh Council, where he rose to the post of Depute City Architect. He was responsible for several notable public building projects, including the Meadowbank Sports Centre and the failed plan to build an opera house in the city. He was deeply interested in local Edinburgh history, and published several books and many articles on the subject, including a definitive work on the origins of local place names.

== Early life and education ==
Stuart Harris was born in Edinburgh, Scotland, the son of Ruth Knappett, a legal secretary, and Henry Harris, the manager of a family-owned firm of fruit and vegetable merchants which was founded by Henry’s father, Frank Harris. Stuart was educated at James Gillespie's Boys School and George Heriot's School.

In 1937, he began a course in architecture at Edinburgh College of Art but his studies were interrupted by World War II and he did not complete the course until 1950. He was admitted as an Associate of the Royal Institute of British Architects in 1954, and as an Associate of the Royal Incorporation of Architects in Scotland in 1955.

From 1946 to 1953, he worked on a voluntary basis at the Gateway Theatre. This was at a time when the theatre, which had just re-opened after the War, was mainly run by volunteers on a shoestring budget. Harris served as technical director and set designer. In the latter role, he reconstructed the entire stage after it had been out of use for several years, finishing the job just hours before the curtain went up on the opening night.

While at the Gateway, he met the actor Moultrie Kelsall, with whom he shared an interest in architectural conservation. This led to a joint book, published in 1961, A Future for the Past.

== Architectural career ==
While still a student, Harris worked for a while as an architectural assistant in the Edinburgh office of Basil Spence & Partners.

In 1950, he joined the Architects Department of Edinburgh Corporation as an assistant architect. He became Depute City Architect in 1969, a post which he was to hold until he retired in 1984. During his career, he was responsible for several significant public works projects.

In the early 1960s, he was in charge of a major refurbishment of the early 15th Century Merchiston Tower (also known as Merchiston Castle), highlights of which were the discovery of an entrance drawbridge and the preservation of a 17th Century plaster ceiling. The project involved the integration of the tower with a group of modern buildings to form the nucleus of Napier Technical College, now the Merchiston campus of Edinburgh Napier University.

From 1967 to 1970, he led the design team for the Meadowbank Sports Centre, a multi-purpose sports facility built to host the 1970 British Commonwealth Games. The work included a 15,000-seat stadium with a distinctive cantilevered steel roof, a three-storey sports hall, field courts and a velodrome. It was used again for the 1986 Commonwealth Games. The centre closed in 2017.

In the 1970s, he was a project manager for the proposed opera house on Castle Terrace. The brief for this project was to create a 1,400-seat theatre for opera and drama, a 250-seat studio theatre, as well as the refurbishment and integration of the existing Royal Lyceum Theatre. As part of the project, Harris visited twenty-one theatres and opera houses in West Germany and Switzerland. But owing to delays, rising costs and problems with the design, the project was eventually abandoned, with the site remaining vacant until the late 1980s. The failure of the opera house has often been cited as an example of a white elephant.

His other projects included Hyvot's Bank Primary School (including the janitor's house, the design of which was based on Harris's own house), Clermiston Primary School, Laigh Coffee House and the conversion of part of the Scotsman buildings to form the City Art Centre.

== Works on local history ==
One of Harris's responsibilities at the Architects Department was the naming of streets. This led to research—which he continued into retirement—on the origins of Edinburgh place names. This in turn led to the publication in 1996 of his The Place Names of Edinburgh. This 608-page reference describes the origins of, and changes in, the names of over a thousand streets, roads, former farms, villages and other features in what is now the city of Edinburgh. It is regarded by local historians as the definitive work on the subject and is frequently cited in articles and books on Edinburgh history.

Harris was an active member of the Old Edinburgh Club and a contributor to its Book, a cumulative work, started in 1908, now consisting of 54 volumes of articles and source material about Edinburgh’s history.

He also undertook research into the history of the Longstone district, where he lived and where he worshipped at the parish church. In 1971, he published a book on the history of the district.

== Personal life ==
In 1949, Harris married Catherine Mciver. The couple had three sons and a daughter.

He was an elder of his church, the Slateford Longstone Parish Church, where he ran the choir. He was involved in the Boys Club movement, and produced plays for the North Merchiston Boys Club and was Honorary Architect to the Club. His other interests included sailing, classical music, organ design and the Scots language.

He died in February 1997, survived by his wife, four children and six grandchildren.

== Published books ==
- A Future for the Past (with Moultrie R Kelsall). Oliver and Boyd, 1961
- The Place Names of Edinburgh: Their Origins and History. Gordon Wright Publishing, 1996
- Parish in the Past. Historical Notes about the Parish of Slateford Longstone. Slateford Longstone Parish Kirk, 1971
