= Nazli Tabatabai-Khatambakhsh =

Iranian British Leader and Collaborator (born 1977)

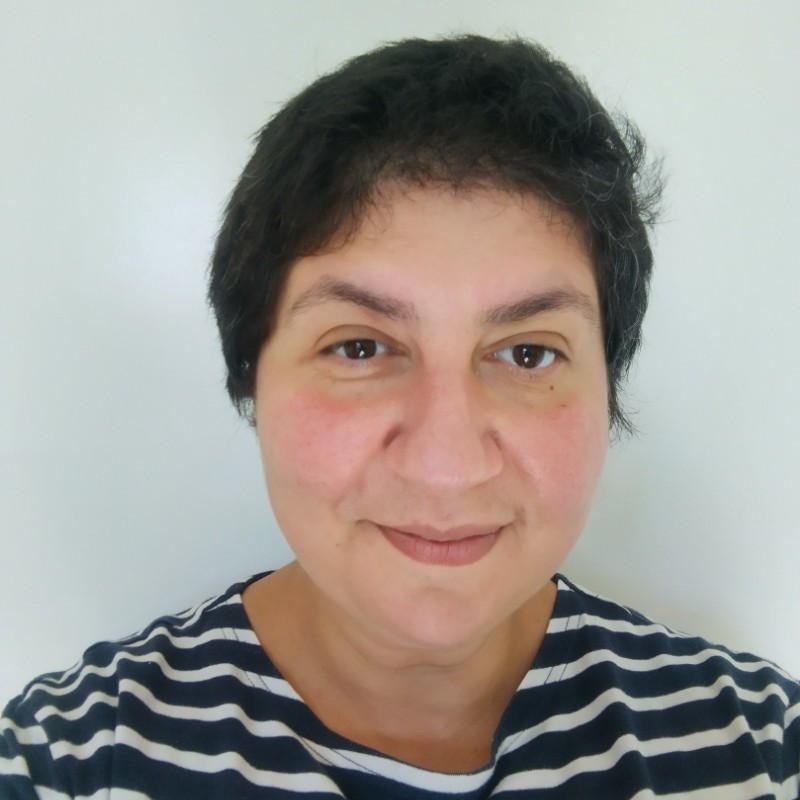
- Born: 23 February 1977 (age 49); Tabriz, Iran
- Occupations: Leader, Collaborator, and Dramaturg
- Website: Nazli Tabatabai-Khatambakhsh on X

Nazli Tabatabai-Khatambakhsh is the inaugural Artistic Doctoral Researcher of Opera Librettist Practice Based at the Guildhall School of Music and Drama where is she is also Dramatic Writing Professor on the MA Opera Making & Writing and Lecturer of Collaborative Performance Making on the MA in Collaborative Performance Making. She is the inaugural Associate Artist at The Oxford School of Drama with a focus on dramaturgy, collaboration, and equitable practices. Her recent opera portfolio includes Royal Ballet and Opera, Aldeburgh Festival Snape Maltings Britten Pears Arts, Birmingham Opera Company, Welsh National Opera, Oxford Song, National Youth Choir, Performance Arts Lab, Tete a Tete and Royal Welsh College of Music and Drama. She was the founder and artistic director (CEO) of ZENDEH, a former Arts Council England National Portfolio Organisation.

== Early life ==
Nazli Tabatabai-Khatambakhsh was born in the northern Iranian city of Tabriz in February 1977. She came to the UK with her parents when she was very young and also spent some of her childhood in France. Her father was an academic, and the family settled in Edinburgh, where he was working. Her mother ran a sweet shop opposite the Royal Lyceum Theatre. Nazli went to James Gillespie's High School in Edinburgh and her favourite subjects included Drama, English and Art.

Her first role in England was in 2001 as an Arts Council England trainee director at Leicester Haymarket Theatre now known as the Curve. She was Staff Director at Derby Playhouse and then Associate Director at the Theatre Workshop Edinburgh. In 2004, she founded the ZENDEH (a theatre company) – the name means "alive" in Persian.

She quotes her influences on her creative practise to include international theatre, politics of Iran and borderlands, sciences, and stories from the silk routes also known as the Royal Road. These can be seen as a direct influence on her creative directing and productions developed within the context of ZENDEH.

== Career ==
Tabatabai-Khatambakhsh is Professor of Dramatic Writing on the Masters in Opera Making and Writing at the Guildhall School of Music and Drama where she is also Associate Artist with a focus on collaboration. She is the inaugural Associate Artist at the Oxford School of Drama and External Examiner for the Royal Central School of Speech and Drama,

Tabatabai-Khatambakhsh was the artistic director of ZENDEH, a theatre company based in the northeast of England that was part of Arts Council England's National Portfolio of Organisations. The company created theatre that combines poetic elements, mythology and explored global political and social perspectives in an approachable way. Many of ZENDEH's shows featured Iranian myths reflecting the cultural heritage of Tabatabai-Khatambakhsh. Although the work itself often rejects cultural representation instead creating a more impressionistic, magical realism, visual and physical style of theatre. ZENDEH's and Nazli's direction and artistic practice is collaborative; working with artists and the wider public, combining art forms and using digital technologies to continually find imaginative ways to share stories and find human connections.

Over Nazli's career, she has developed a strong leadership role in producing diverse theatre in the UK in particular looking at themes of Iran, borderlands and the lives of women.

She has experience of governance, including serving as a member of the International Society of Performing Arts (ISPA) governing committee in New York.

== Achievements ==
Tabatabai-Khatambakhsh received an Amnesty International Commendation for her direction at the Edinburgh Festival Fringe. She has worked as a Director (BBC Drama & National Theatre of Scotland, Traverse Theatre, The Bush); Dramaturg (Royal Court, Tamasha, Peter Groom & Goethe Institute); Director & Dramaturg, current External Examiner (Royal Central School of Speech and Drama); Actor (Edinburgh Festival Fringe Summerhall, Traverse Theatre, Paines Plough Roundabout). She works as a Coach, Mentor, Mediator, Facilitator, Moderator, Trainer and Speaker (ISPA, IETM, Federation of Scottish Theatres, Assembly Theatres and Guildhall School of Music & Drama).

Through her work over more than ten years as artistic director and CEO with ZENDEH, she has developed her own multi-staged method of creating theatrical productions. The seven stages that include, but are not restricted to, blue sky thinking; collaboration in multidisciplinary art forms and working with a wide range of associate artists; emphasis on dramaturgy; and re-approaching joint authorship with participation, engagement and research.

She also led on Arts Council England's Creative Case NORTH, which is a re-imagining of Arts Council England’s approach to diversity and equality, setting out how these areas can and should enrich the arts for artists, audiences and wider society.

== Selected works as playwright, performance poet, librettist, screen writer ==
- Marrigae of... (Oxford, 2026) Opera
- Writing, Traces (London, 2026) Opera
- Brilliant Light (London, 2026) Opera
- Book of Queens (Oxford, 2025) Opera
- The Flying Shadow (London, 2025) Opera
- My Lifelong Prisoner (Cardiff, 2025) Opera
- My House is Your House (Oxford, 2025) Screen
- You are an ocean in a drop (Oxford, 2025) Screen
- Medea on the Mic (Glasgow, 2024) Theatre
- Jo Deer (Oxford, 2024) Screen
- Feathers and Beak (New York, 2024) Performance Poetry
- Feathers and Beak (Brussels, 2023) Performance Poetry
- Leonard (Birmingham, 2023) Opera
- TIDE (Alderburgh Festival, Snape Maltings, 2022) Opera
- Paradise Garden (London, 2021) Chamber Opera
- Paper Dolls (Newcastle, 2010) Theatre
- Khaki (EdFringe, Edinburgh 2006) Theatre
- Safe Passage (Leicester, 2001) Theatre

== Personal life ==
Nazli is the daughter of Dr. M. T. Tabatabai-Khatambaksh and Mrs M. Tabatabai-Khatambakhsh. She is based in London, United Kingdom.
