= Ethel Houston =

Solicitor and Enigma code breaker

Ethel Houston OBE
- Born: 19 April 1924; Albacete, Spain
- Died: 30 November 2017 (aged 93); Edinburgh, Scotland
- Education: University of Edinburgh
- Occupation: Solicitor
- Known for: Solicitor, Enigma code breaker, and the first woman to become senior partner at a Scottish law firm

Ethel Houston OBE (19 April 1924 – 30 November 2017) was a solicitor, Enigma code breaker, and the first woman to become senior partner at a Scottish law firm. She served on the Law Society's Council between 1975 and 1981, one of the first women to hold the position. She also served on the Royal Commission on Legal Services in Scotland, and the Commission for Racial Equality.

== Early life and education ==
Houston was born in Albacete, Spain, in 1924 to Christian Brethren parents who worked as missionaries in the country. Her mother was also called Ethel. Houston had two siblings, including an elder brother James.

Houston's parents moved to Edinburgh in 1931, and sent her to James Gillespie's High School for girls. She later attended Skerry's College, and at the encouragement of her father fitted two years of work into three months, in order to pass entrance exams to the University of Edinburgh.

In 1940, and at the age of 16, Houston entered the University of Edinburgh, along with her elder brother James. Following her graduation with an MA in 1943, she applied for a Bachelor of Laws, whilst undertaking an apprenticeship at Balfour & Manson. However, she was soon called up for military service, the university having alerted the military to her suitability.

== Career ==
She was recruited to work in Bletchley Park in Hut 6 during the final year of World War Two. Under Gordon Welchman's command, Houston worked to improve Alan Turing's Bombe machine and compiled lists of messages used to create its menus. After being demobbed, she returned to University, and in 1947 became a solicitor. Houston spoke about her work at Bletchley only later in life, and her name was added to the Codebreakers’ Wall, a digital commemorative wall for veterans, families and supporters of Bletchley.

In 1949, Houston was made partner of Scottish law firm Balfour and Manson. She was one of only four partners at the firm, and the first woman to be made senior partner at a Scottish firm.

In 1981, she was awarded an OBE, and in 2009, honorary membership of the Scottish Law Society.

== Personal life and interests ==
Her parents' Christian faith, which Houston inherited, shaped her sense of justice and of obligation to the less fortunate in society. Her clients included a number of charities, and she worked with doctors to set up several medical charities. Houston was also a supporter of the arts and helped to establish Leith School of Art in 1988.

Houston enjoyed travel, including to Canada, where her family lived; she owned a flat in Nice and also rented a cottage in Berwickshire. After she retired, she was one of the first women to be admitted members in their own right of the New Club, Edinburgh.

== Death and legacy ==
Houston died in Edinburgh, aged 93 and is survived by nieces and nephews. She was described in her obituary as a "non-conformist, feisty and a fiercely independent thinker".
