= Christina Kay =

Scottish school teacher, inspiration for Miss Jean Brodie

- Born: 11 June 1878; Edinburgh
- Died: 23 May 1951 (aged 72); Midhope, West Lothian
- Education: James Gillespie's School for Girls
- Employer: James Gillespie's School for Girls
- Parents: Alexander Kay, cabinet maker (father); Mary Ann MacDonald (mother)

Christina Kay (11 June 1878 – 23 May 1951) was a Scottish school teacher and served as an inspiration for Miss Jean Brodie, the leading character in the novel The Prime of Miss Jean Brodie by Muriel Spark.

== Private life ==
Kay, an only child, was born at 4 Grindlay Street, Edinburgh, where she lived most of her life. She was a pupil at the James Gillespie's School for Girls from the age of five, and she later taught there. Her father, Alexander Kay, a cabinet maker, died when she was 15. She continued to live with her mother and cared for her until her death in 1913.

Kay was a devout Christian and remained unmarried. She is buried in Abercorn Cemetery, West Lothian, as she had wished.

== Career ==
Kay was trained as a teacher at the Church of Scotland College, Edinburgh, between 1897 and 1899. She was described as an "exemplary" student. She taught at the James Gillespie's School for Girls. Because she did not have a university degree she remained a class mistress and did not get promotion. She retired in 1942.

== Kay as inspiration for Miss Jean Brodie ==
One of Kay's pupils was Muriel Camberg, better known as the author Muriel Spark, whose literary success Kay predicted. The eponymous character in Spark's novel The Prime of Miss Jean Brodie is based on Christina Kay. Like Miss Jean Brodie, Kay told her pupils about her travels in Italy and was an admirer of Mussolini. She had a picture of the Fascisti on her classroom wall. Kay called her class "the crème de la crème" and formed friendships with individual pupils, including Muriel Camberg and her friend Frances Niven. She took some of them on private outings.

Kay's pupils believed a rumour that she had lost a fiancé in the First World War, though she never confirmed it. In The Prime of Miss Jean Brodie Miss Brodie also had a fiancé whom she lost in the war.
