= James Gillespie (philanthropist) =

18th-century Scottish snuff and tobacco merchant

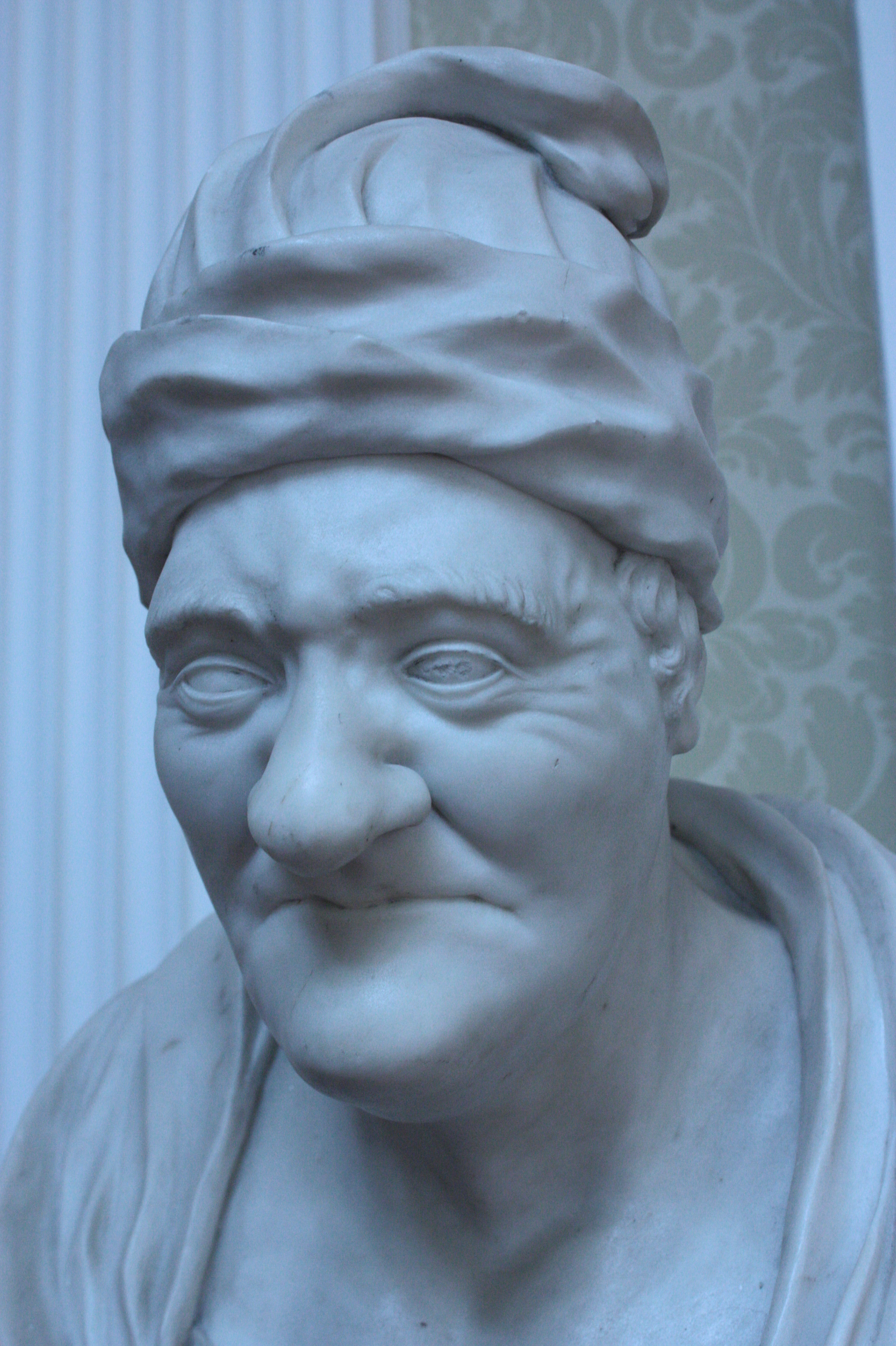
- Born: 28 April 1726; Roslin, Midlothian
- Died: 8 April 1797 (aged 70)
- Occupations: Snuff and tobacco merchant

James Gillespie (1726–1797) was a Scottish snuff and tobacco merchant in Edinburgh in the 18th century. He never married, and upon his death left a fortune with the request that a hospital and school for the poor should be built, now known as James Gillespie's High School. Gillespie Crescent and Gillespie Street (both north of the school) are named after him.

== Life ==
James Gillespie was born in Roslin, Midlothian, south of Edinburgh, on 28 April 1726.

He grew to fame and fortune in the city as a merchant, working with his younger brother John who ran the family shop, and eventually becoming one of Edinburgh's richest men. The tobacco he sold came from America ( Virginia), from slave plantations.

He had a snuff mill at Colinton employing many people, all of whom it is said were treated well. In 1773 he built Spylaw House, an impressive Georgian mansion house, as his home. Most of his staff lived in the house, which was attached to his mill.

He was notoriously thrifty and is credited with inventing the phrase "waste not, want not", though Henry Erskine, alluding to Gillespie's snuff-fortune, said of his handsome carriage, "Who would have thought it, that noses had bought it".

A tablet marks the site of his shop at 231 High Street on the Royal Mile.

He died on 8 April 1797 and is buried in a large enclosed vault on the north side of the church in Colinton Churchyard, near his house. His brother had died five years earlier, and as neither had married there was no direct heir. He left an estate plus £12,000, an important sum at the time.

== School ==
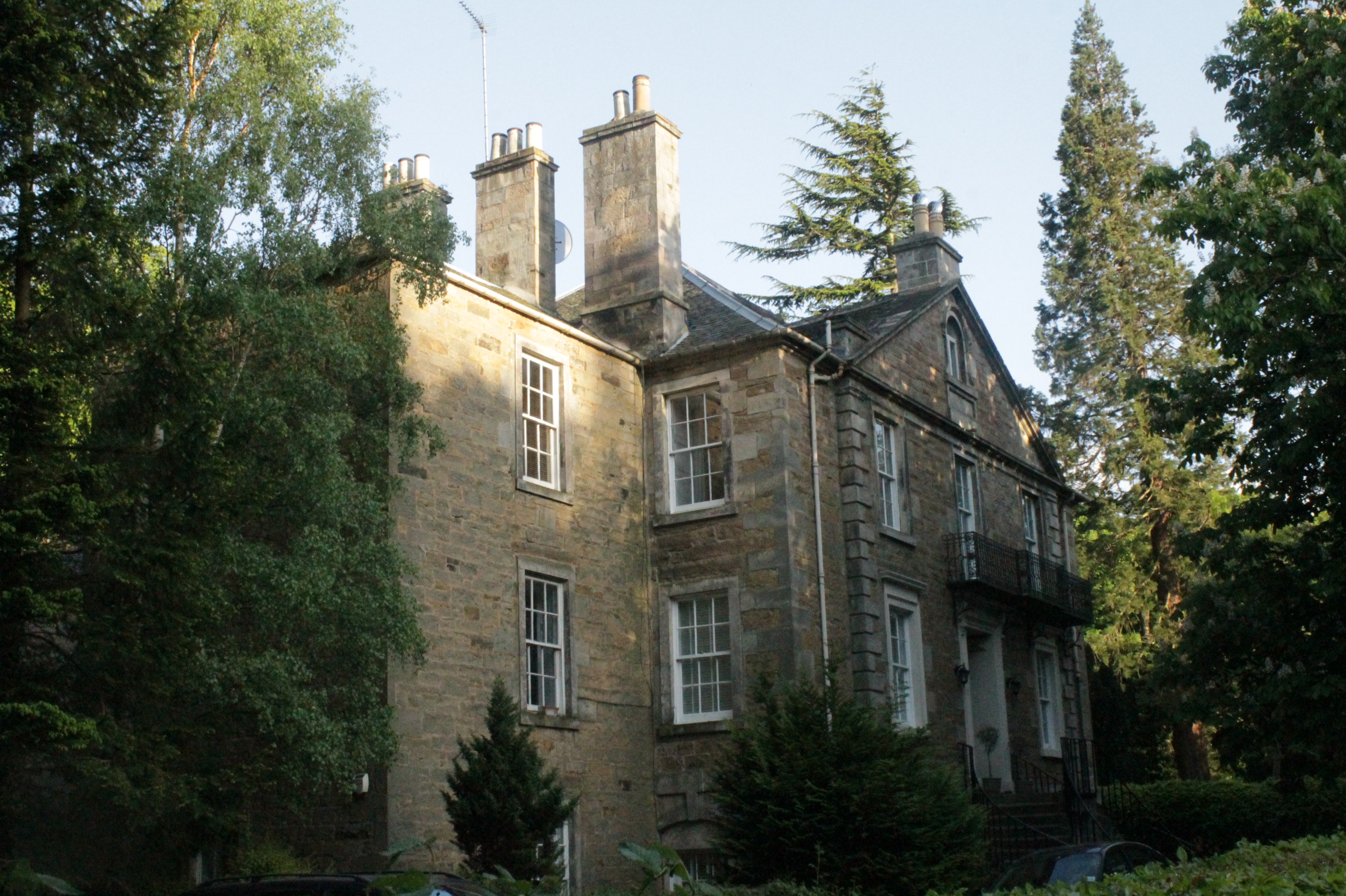
Spylaw House, Edinburgh

A quarter of Gillespie's bequest (£2,700) was left for the establishment of a free school for the education of poor boys. The school was founded in 1803. The school was to educate boys between the ages of six and twelve who were required to produce proof of their poverty and a certificate of good health.

The school is still in operation and has grown significantly. Since its foundation it has moved and changed ownership several times. In 1923 it opened its doors to girls as well as boys. It now comprises James Gillespie's Primary School and James Gillespie's High School, both colocated in Marchmont.

In 2020 growing awareness of Gillespie's links to the Virginian slave trade caused a public petition to be raised to rename the school. “This makes [Gillespie] a direct contributor and benefactor of the slave trade. It is possible that Gillespie may have owned slaves himself. It is time that we change the name of our school to something that truly values the diversity that exists within it.”

== Hospital ==
Gillespie's Hospital (built using the money left in his will) was built on the site of Lord Bargenie's baronial mansion in Bruntsfield, which was demolished in 1800, much to the chagrin of Henry Cockburn who claimed that the historic and picturesque edifice built originally by a branch of the Napier family had been "brutally obliterated" while "the idiot public looked on in silence".

The hospital building which was later built around on its north side by Gillespie Crescent, and thereafter approached via this road, was converted to workshops for the Royal Blind Asylum in 1925 (dealing with the war blinded). It was in turn demolished in 1975 after brief disuse following relocation of the Blind Workshops to Craigmillar in 1973. It was replaced by new apartment blocks for the elderly in 1975.

The hospital, intended to provide for the aged poor, had selection criteria for entry: any person who had worked for the brothers; any person with the surname Gillespie aged 55 or over; persons over 55 from Edinburgh or Leith. All had to be without private resources, "decent, godly and well-behaved".

== Artefacts ==
- James Gillespie's original shop sign is held by the Museum of Edinburgh
- A large snuff jar from his house is held by Lady Stair's House (the Writers' Museum).

== Gallery ==
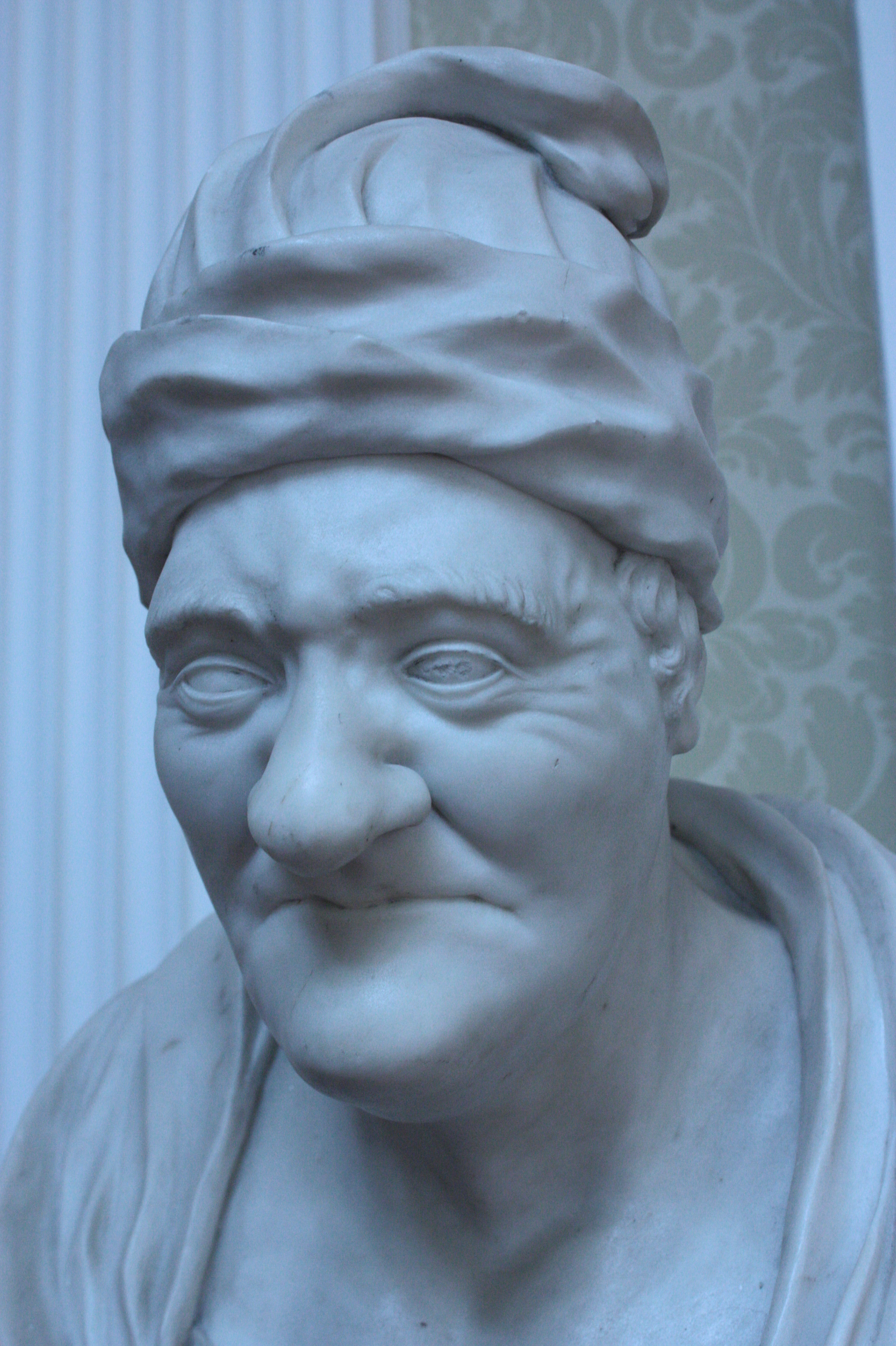
James Gillespie - bust in Merchants Hall, Edinburgh

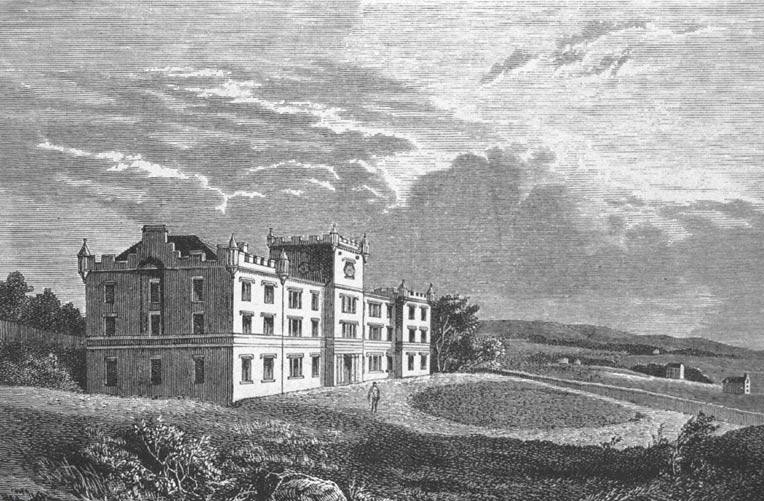
Gillespie's Hospital, c.1805

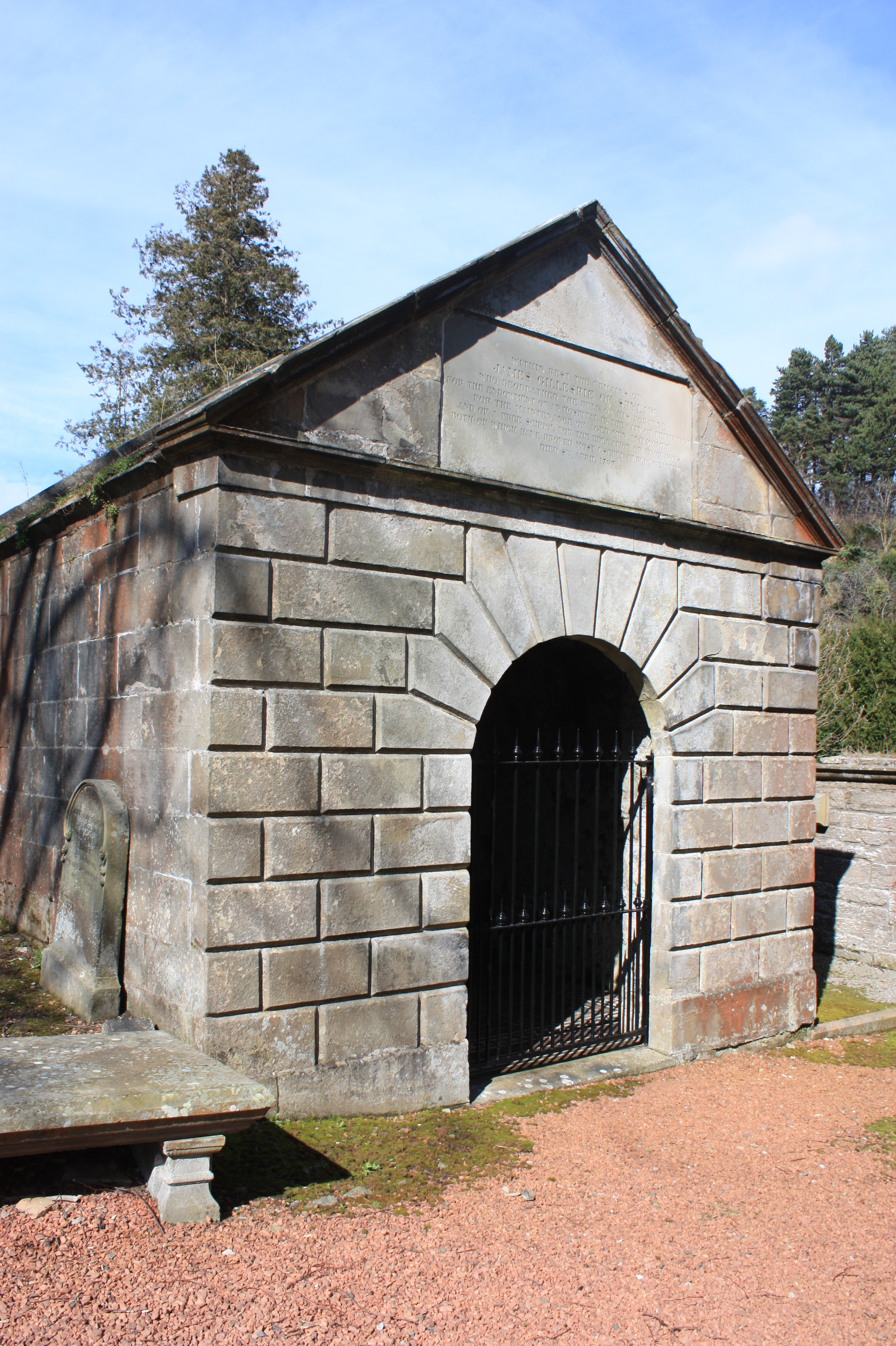
The Gillespie vault, Colinton churchyard

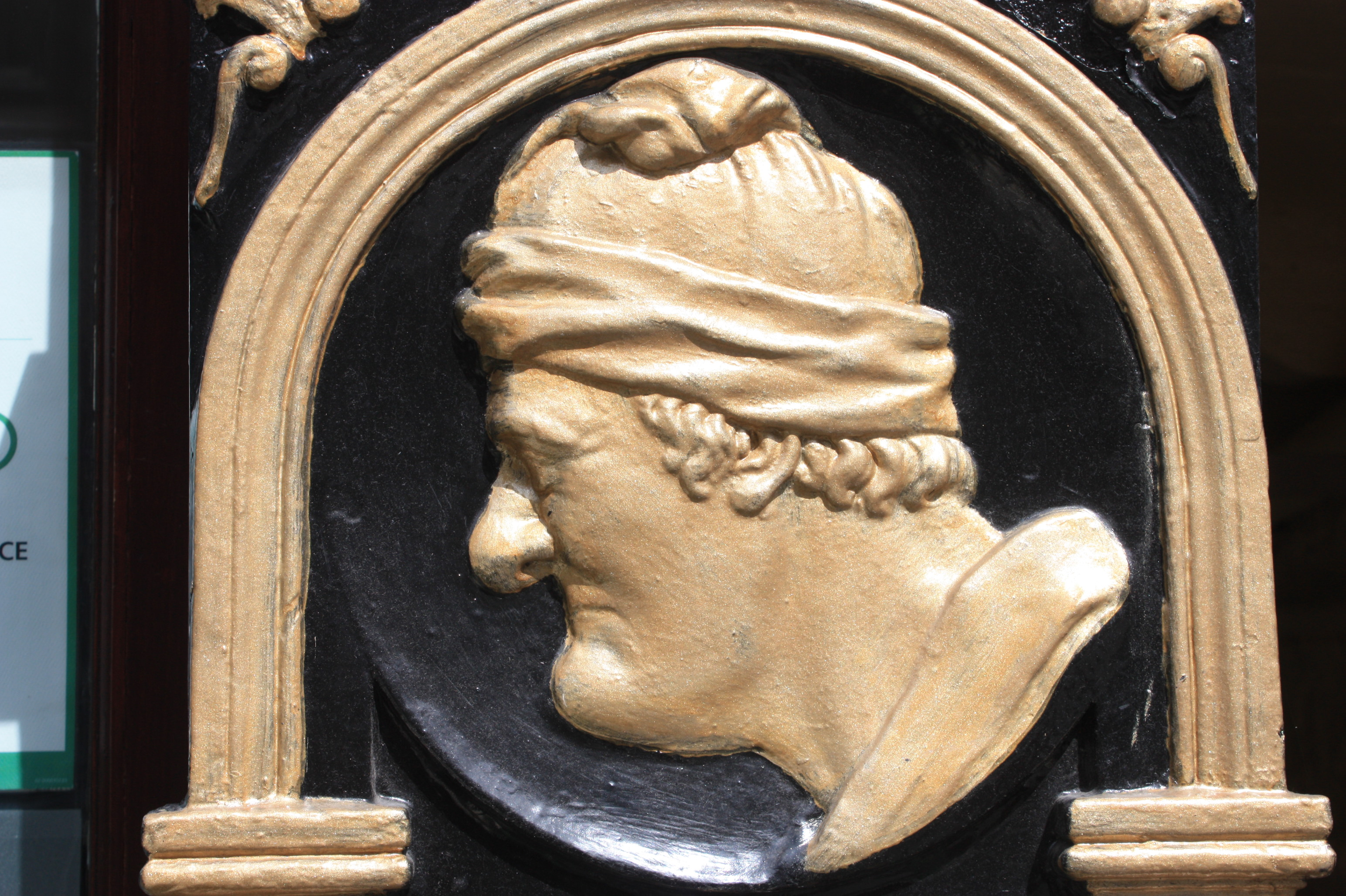
James Gillespie's portrait on the site of his shop on Edinburgh's Royal Mile

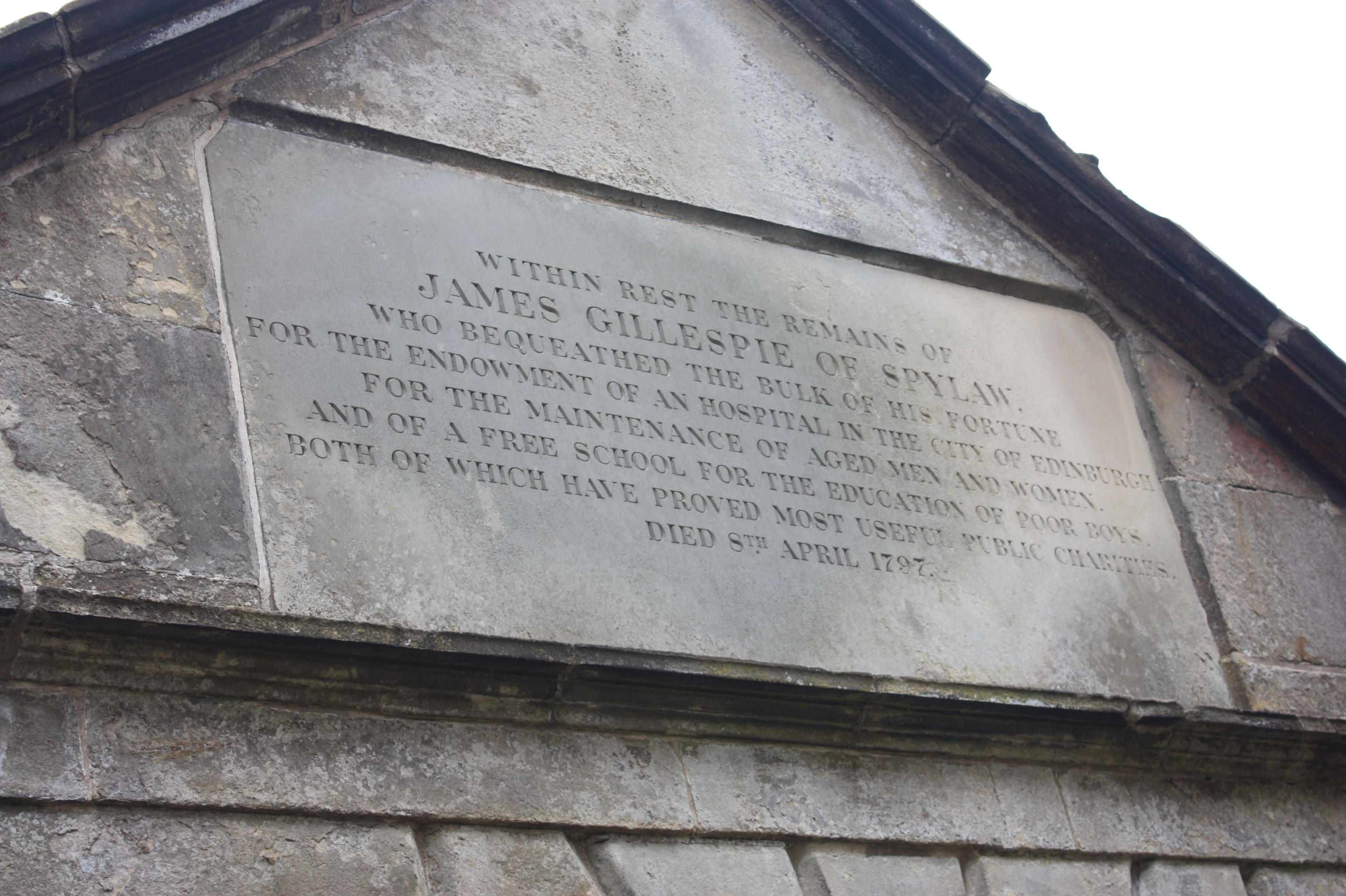
Inscription on James Gillespie's tomb, Colinton, Edinburgh
