= Elizabeth Malloch =

Elizabeth Gilmour Malloch (6 September 1910 – 29 September 2000) was an educator and activist for equality within the Episcopal Church. She was one of the first women to become a priest in the Episcopal Church.

== Early life ==
Malloch was born in Edinburgh, Scotland on September 6, 1910. She was the eldest of four children and the only daughter of Jane Clarke, a telegraphist in the Civil Service, and John Malloch, an accountant.

== Education ==
Malloch attended James Gillespie's High School and the Edinburgh Ladies' College (now The Mary Erskine School). Malloch went on to study at the University of Edinburgh, where she earned a degree in French and Latin and won the University Prize. She then completed a Diploma of Education, as well as qualifications in primary and secondary education at Moray House School of Education and Sport.

== Career ==
Malloch taught at Manchester High School for Girls before beginning her teacher's training at Bingley College of Education in 1942. In 1947, she became an Inspector of Schools in Leeds. In 1949, she became the principal of the Stafford Training College (which became Madeley College of Education and was eventually merged into Staffordshire University).

Malloch was the college principal at Stafford for about 20 years, during which time, she oversaw the school's move and a rising student population from less than 400 to more than 1200.

Malloch was a member of the National Advisory Council on the Training and Supply of Teachers and consulted for organisations about teacher training and education.

Malloch retired to Essex in 1970, after working at Stafford for 21 years. Her retirement ceremony was attended by Princess Margaret, then the Chancellor of Keele University. In 1980, she returned to Edinburgh.

== Volunteer work ==
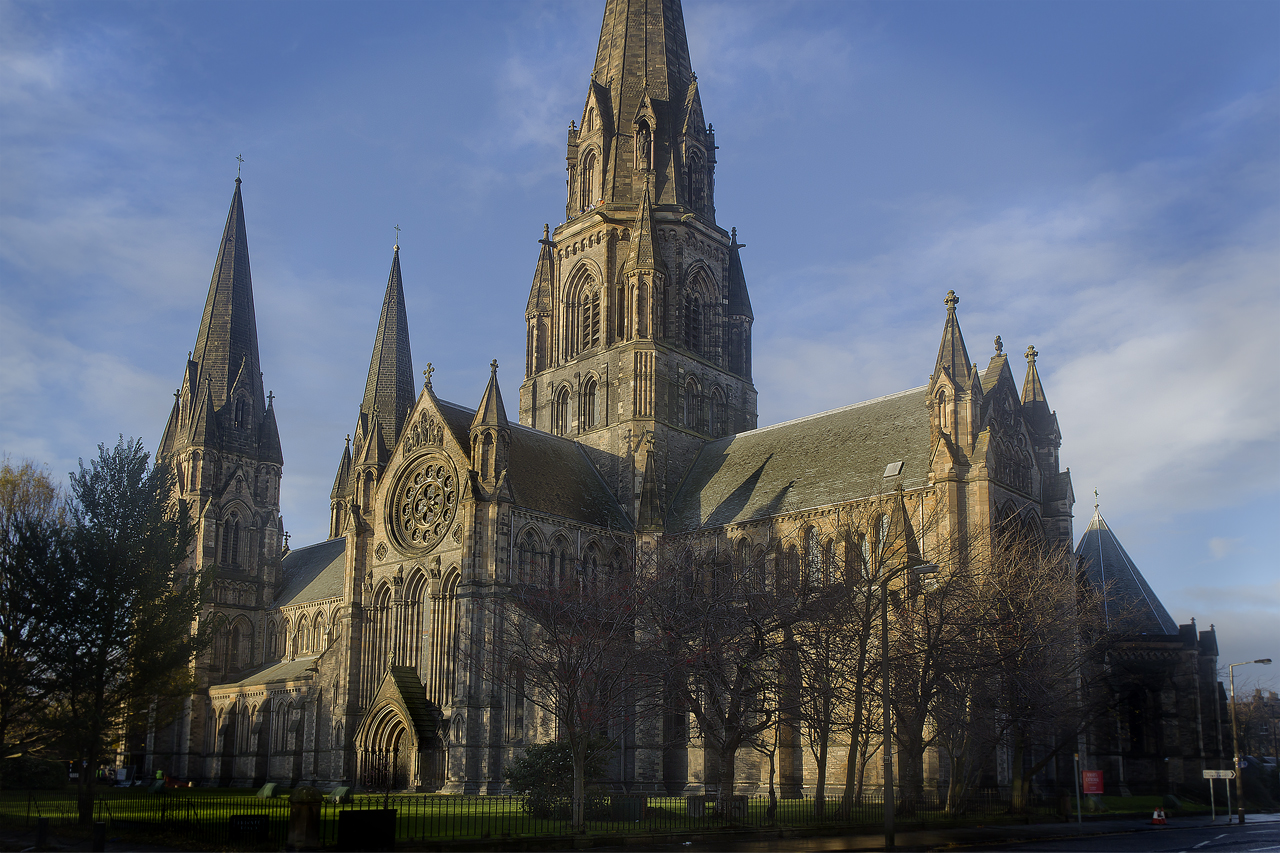
St Mary's Cathedral, Edinburgh

Malloch volunteered with the Girlguiding Movement. In her youth, she was a Brownie at the North Morningside Church, 63rd Company, and went on to become a Guide and a Ranger. When she moved to Manchester, she became the leader of Guide Units, including for Hulme, an area which had been severely damaged by bombing during World War II. Malloch became the vice-president of the Staffordshire County Guide Association.

In her retirement, Malloch volunteered as a Soroptimist International and was an Open University tutor.

== Role in the Episcopalian Church ==
In 1972, Malloch became a pastoral assistant and a reader at her local church. On her return to Edinburgh, she undertook similar roles at St Mary's Episcopal Cathedral before becoming a deacon in 1986. After a campaign for women to be admitted as priests, in 1994, she became one of the first, and oldest, women to become a priest within the Episcopal Church.

Malloch was a member of the Movement for the Whole Ministry, which aimed to make the Church more inclusive. She also volunteered as an English tutor at YWCA Roundabout Centre.
