= The Prime of Miss Jean Brodie (novel) =

1961 novel by Muriel Spark

- First edition cover
- Author: Muriel Spark
- Cover artist: Victor Reinganum
- Language: English
- Set in: Edinburgh, 1930s
- Publisher: Macmillan
- Publication date: 1961
- Publication place: United Kingdom
- Media type: Print
- Pages: 170
- OCLC: 1068257134
- Dewey Decimal: 823.914
- LC Class: PR6037 .P29

The Prime of Miss Jean Brodie is a novel by Muriel Spark, the best known of her works. It was first published in The New Yorker magazine and was published as a book by Macmillan in 1961. The character of Miss Jean Brodie brought Spark international fame and brought her into the first rank of contemporary Scottish literature. In 2005, the novel was chosen by Time magazine as one of the 100 best English-language novels from 1923 to present. In 2026, it placed #31 on The Guardian's list of the 100 best novels of all time.

== Plot summary ==
In 1930s Edinburgh, six 10-year-old girls, Sandy, Rose, Mary, Jenny, Monica, and Eunice, are assigned Miss Jean Brodie, who describes herself as being "in my prime," as their teacher. Miss Brodie, determined that they shall receive an education in the original sense of the Latin verb educere, "to lead out", gives her students lessons about her personal love life and travels, promoting art history, classical studies, and fascism. Under her mentorship, these six girls whom Brodie singles out as the elite group among her students—known as the "Brodie set"—begin to stand out from the rest of the school. However, in one of the novel's typical flash-forwards we learn that one of them later will betray Brodie, ruining her teaching career, but that Brodie herself will never learn the identity of this traitor.

In the Junior School, they meet the singing teacher, the short Mr. Gordon Lowther, and the art master, the handsome, one-armed war veteran Mr. Teddy Lloyd, a married Catholic with six children. These two teachers form a love triangle with Miss Brodie, each loving her, but she loves only Mr. Lloyd. However, Miss Brodie never overtly acts on her love for Mr. Lloyd except once to exchange a kiss with him, witnessed by Monica. During a two-week absence from school, Miss Brodie embarks on an affair with Mr. Lowther on the grounds that a bachelor makes a more respectable paramour: She has renounced Mr. Lloyd as he is married. At one point during these two years in the Junior School, Jenny is "accosted by a man joyfully exposing himself beside the Water of Leith." The police investigation of the exposure leads Sandy to imagine herself as part of a fictional police force seeking incriminating evidence in respect of Brodie and Mr. Lowther.

Once the girls are promoted to the Senior School (around age 12) but now dispersed, they hold on to their identity as the Brodie set. Miss Brodie keeps in touch with them after school hours by inviting them to her home as she did when they were her pupils. All the while, the headmistress Miss Mackay tries to break them up and compile information gleaned from them into sufficient cause for Brodie's dismissal. Miss Mackay has more than once suggested to Miss Brodie that she should seek employment at a 'progressive' school; Miss Brodie declines to move to what she describes as a 'crank' school. When two other teachers at the school, the Kerr sisters, take part-time employment as Mr. Lowther's housekeepers, Miss Brodie tries to take over their duties. She sets about fattening him with extravagant cooking. The girls, now aged 13, visit Miss Brodie in pairs at Mr. Lowther's house, where Miss Brodie frequently asks about Mr. Lloyd in Mr. Lowther's presence. At this point, Mr. Lloyd asks Rose and occasionally the other girls to pose for him as portrait subjects. Each face he paints ultimately resembles Miss Brodie, as her girls report to her in detail, and she is thrilled. One day when Sandy is visiting Mr. Lloyd, he kisses her.

Before the Brodie set turns 16, Miss Brodie tests her girls to discover which of them she can trust, ultimately settling on Sandy as her confidante. Miss Brodie is obsessed with the notion that Rose, as the most beautiful of the Brodie set, should have an affair with Mr. Lloyd in her place. She begins to neglect Mr. Lowther, who then marries Miss Lockhart, the science teacher. Another student, Joyce Emily, steps briefly into the picture, trying unsuccessfully to join the Brodie set. Miss Brodie takes her under her wing separately, encouraging her to run away to fight in the Spanish Civil War on the Nationalist side, which she does, only to be killed in an accident when the train she is travelling in is attacked.

The original Brodie set, now aged 17 and in their final year of school, begin to go their separate ways. Mary and Jenny leave before taking their exams, Mary to become a typist and Jenny to pursue a career in acting. Eunice becomes a nurse and Monica a scientist. Rose lands a handsome husband. Sandy, with a keen interest in psychology, is fascinated by Mr. Lloyd's stubborn love, his painter's mind, and his religion. Sandy and Rose model for Mr. Lloyd's paintings, Sandy knowing that Miss Brodie expects Rose to become sexually involved with Lloyd. Rose, however, is oblivious to the plan crafted for her, and so it is Sandy, now 18 and alone with Mr. Lloyd in his house while his wife and children are on holiday, who has exactly such an affair with him for five weeks during the summer. Over time, Sandy's interest in the man wanes while her interest in the mind that still loves Jean Brodie grows.

In the end, Sandy leaves him, adopts his Catholic religion, and becomes a nun. Beforehand, however, she meets with Miss Mackay and blatantly confesses to wanting to bring a stop to Miss Brodie. She suggests that the headmistress could accuse Brodie of encouraging fascism, and this tactic succeeds. Miss Brodie is forced to retire, placing suspicion upon every member of the set except for Sandy, while maintaining contact in the years following; she considers Mary's death to have been God's judgement for her possible betrayal. Not until her dying moment, a year after the end of World War II in Europe, is Miss Brodie able to imagine that it was Sandy who betrayed her. After her death, Sandy, now called Sister Helena of the Transfiguration and author of The Transfiguration of the Commonplace, maintains that "it's only possible to betray where loyalty is due." One day, an enquiring young man visits Sandy at the convent because of her strange book on psychology. He enquires about the main influences of her school years, asking her: "Were they literary or political or personal? Was it Calvinism?" Sandy answers him by saying: "There was a Miss Jean Brodie in her prime."

== Characters ==
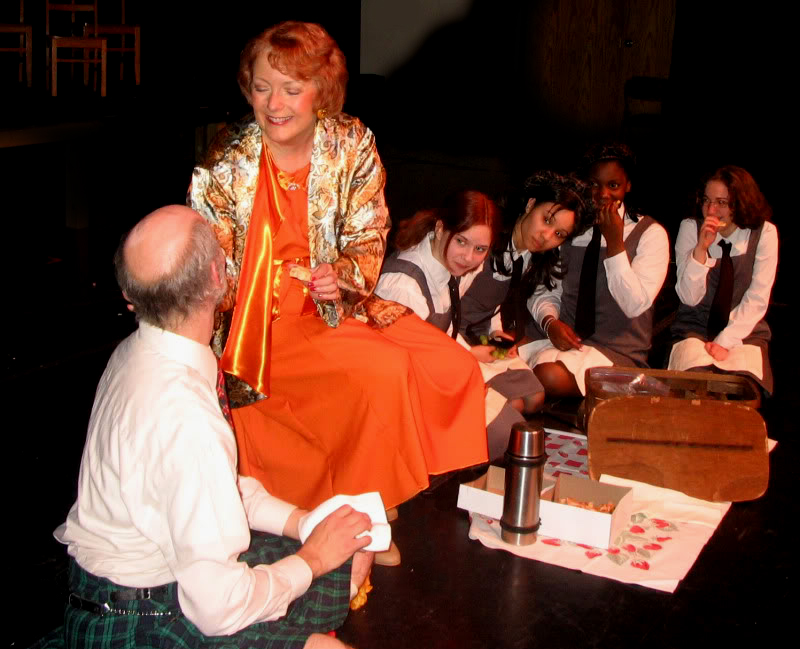
Scene from a stage version: Mr. Lowther, Miss Brodie, Jenny, Sandy, Monica, Mary

=== Main characters ===
Jean Brodie

"She thinks she is Providence, thought Sandy, she thinks she is the God of Calvin." In some ways she is: in her prime she draws her chosen few to herself, much as Calvinists understand God to draw the elect to their salvation. With regard to religion, Miss Brodie "was not in any doubt, she let everyone know she was in no doubt, that God was on her side whatever her course, and so she experienced no difficulty or sense of hypocrisy in worship while at the same time she went to bed with the singing master." Feeling herself fated one way or another, Brodie acts as if she transcends morality.

Sandy Stranger

Of the set, "Miss Brodie fixed on Sandy," taking her as her special confidante. She is characterised as having "small, almost nonexistent, eyes" and a peering gaze. Miss Brodie repeatedly reminds Sandy that she has insight but no instinct. Sandy rejects Calvinism, reacting against its rigid predestination in favour of Catholicism.

Rose Stanley

In contrast to Sandy, Rose is an attractive blonde with (according to Miss Brodie) instinct but no insight. Although somewhat undeservedly, Rose is "famous for sex", and the art teacher Mr. Lloyd asks her to model for his paintings: It becomes clear that he has no sexual interest in her and uses her simply because she is a good model. In every painting, Rose has the likeness of Brodie, whom Mr. Lloyd stubbornly loves. Rose and Sandy are the two girls in whom Miss Brodie places the most hope of becoming the crème de la crème. Again unlike Sandy, Rose "shook off Miss Brodie's influence as a dog shakes pond-water from its coat."

Mary Macgregor

Dim-witted and slow, Mary is Brodie's scapegoat. Mary meekly bears the blame for everything that goes wrong. At the age of 23, she dies in a hotel fire, running back and forth through the hotel, unable to escape.

=== Supporting characters ===
- Monica Douglas – one of the set; famous for mathematics and her anger
- Jenny Gray – one of the set; famous for her beauty
- Eunice Gardiner – one of the set; famous for her gymnastics and glorious swimming
- Teddy Lloyd – the art master
- Gordon Lowther – the singing master
- Miss Mackay – the headmistress
- Miss Alison Kerr – the sewing mistress of Marcia Blaine with her sister Ellen
- Miss Ellen Kerr – Miss Alison's elder sister
- Miss Gaunt – a school mistress and a sister to the minister of Cramond
- Miss Lockhart – a chemistry teacher, the nicest teacher in Marcia Blaine
- Joyce Emily Hammond – a girl who was sent to Marcia Blaine, who later dies in the Spanish Civil War

== Structure ==
Spark creates deep characterisations that are realistic in their human imperfections. Hal Hager, in his commentary on the novel, writes of Sandy and Miss Brodie: "The complexity of these two characters, especially Jean Brodie, mirrors the complexity of human life. Jean Brodie is genuinely intent on opening up her girls' lives, on heightening their awareness of themselves and their world, and on breaking free of restrictive, conventional ways of thinking, feeling, and being". Critic James Wood noted that by "reducing Miss Brodie to no more than a collection of maxims, Spark forces us to become Brodie's pupils. In the course of the novel we never leave the school to go home, alone, with Miss Brodie. We surmise that there is something unfulfilled and even desperate about her, but the novelist refuses us access to her interior. Brodie talks a great deal about her prime, but we don't witness it, and the nasty suspicion falls that perhaps to talk so much about one's prime is by definition no longer to be in it."

== Autobiographical basis of the story ==
The character of Miss Jean Brodie was based in part on Christina Kay, a teacher of Spark's for two years at James Gillespie's School for Girls. Spark later wrote of her: "What filled our minds with wonder and made Christina Kay so memorable was the personal drama and poetry within which everything in her classroom happened." Miss Kay was the basis for the good parts of Brodie's character, but also some of the more bizarre; for example, Miss Kay did hang posters of Renaissance paintings on the wall, but also of Benito Mussolini and Italian fascists marching.

The novel is the best known of Spark's works.

== Adaptations ==
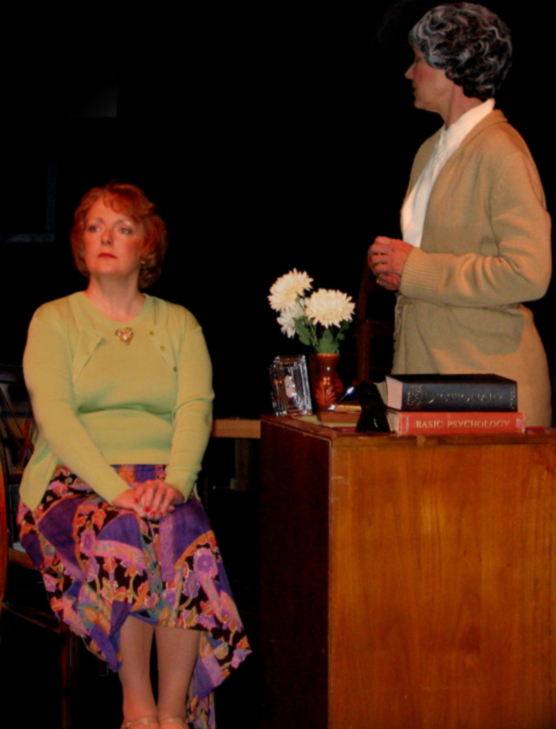
Miss Brodie and Miss Mackay in Jay Presson Allen's stage adaptation of the book

The novel has been adapted for stage, film and television.

The original 1966 London stage version starred Vanessa Redgrave and Olivia Hussey. Redgrave turned down the Broadway production in 1968, which starred Zoe Caldwell who later won the Tony Award. Redgrave also turned down the film role. In 1969, the film The Prime of Miss Jean Brodie was released. It starred Maggie Smith, and she won the Academy Award for Best Actress for her performance. In 1978, Scottish Television produced the seven part serial The Prime of Miss Jean Brodie. It starred Geraldine McEwan. The author preferred the latter's performance.

Jay Presson Allen's adaptation of the novel was staged at the Brunton Theatre, Musselburgh, under the direction of Charles Nowosielski, in October 1987, with Beth Robens in the title role. In 2003, it was produced by the Lyceum Theatre Company, Edinburgh, under the direction of Muriel Romanes, with Siobhan Redmond as Miss Jean Brodie. David Harrower adapted the novel for a 2026 theatrical tour directed by Vicky Featherstone with Gayle Rankin in the titular role.

The National Theatre of Scotland's production of David Harrower's adaptation of the novel, directed by Vicky Featherstone, with Gayle Rankin in the title role, toured Scottish theatres in the autumn of 2026.

== Critical reception ==
In 1998, the Modern Library ranked The Prime of Miss Jean Brodie No. 76 on its list of the 100 best English-language novels of the 20th century.

In 2005, the novel was chosen by Time magazine as one of the 100 best English-language novels from 1923 to present.

In November 2019, The Prime of Miss Jean Brodie appeared on the BBC News list of the 100 most influential novels.

In 2026, it placed #31 on The Guardian's list of the 100 best novels of all time.
