= Jean Brodie =

Fictional school teacher

Maggie Smith as the title character in the film adaptation of The Prime of Miss Jean Brodie

Jean Brodie is the name of a fictional character in the Muriel Spark novel The Prime of Miss Jean Brodie (1961), as well as in the play and 1969 film of the same name—both by Jay Presson Allen—which were based on the novel.

Miss Brodie is a highly idealistic character with an exaggerated romantic view of the world; many of her catchphrases have become clichés in the English language.

The fictional Miss Brodie claims she is a direct descendant of Deacon William Brodie, a fashioner of gibbets who was executed on a gibbet that he may have designed himself.

== Character ==
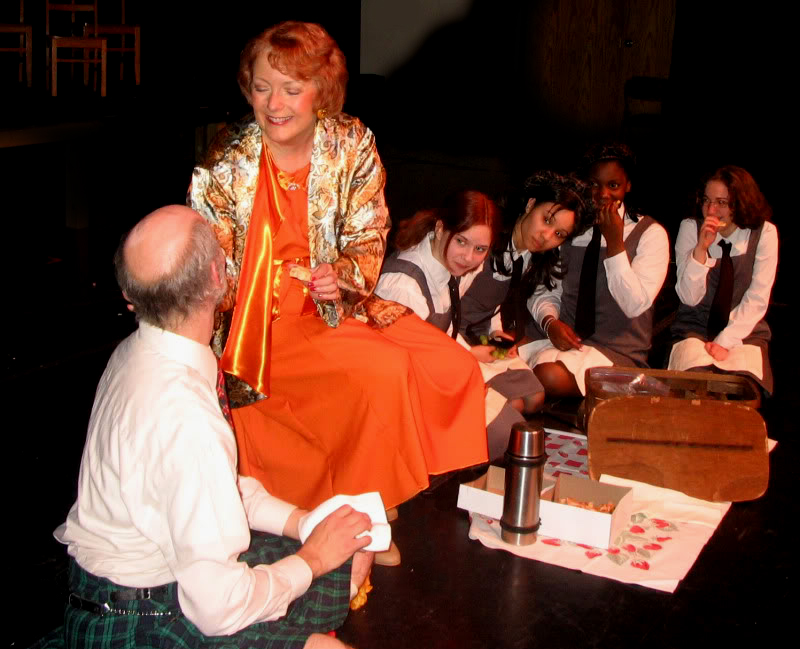
Miss Brodie with Mr. Lowther and the Brodie set in Jay Presson Allen's stage adaptation of The Prime of Miss Jean Brodie

In the novel, Miss Jean Brodie is a school teacher at Marcia Blaine, a conservative girls' school in 1930s Edinburgh, Scotland. She is a charismatic spinster who appears to be out of place in her surroundings. In 1930, she declares that her "prime" has begun and sets out to make sure her class gets the full benefit of her prime by making sure they are aware of drama, art, and fascist beliefs. Out of her class, she selects her favourite girls and attempts to mould them into the "crème de la crème". In the novel, these girls are Sandy, Monica, Jenny, Eunice, Rose, and Mary MacGregor. There is also Joyce Emily, who attempts to force her way into the Brodie set, but she is dismissed by Miss Brodie. Sandy eventually becomes a cloistered nun by the name of Sister Helena; Mary MacGregor is killed in a hotel fire; and Joyce Emily enlists in the Spanish Civil War, where she is killed.

The other teachers and the headmistress Miss Mackay bemoan the fact that Miss Brodie's "special girls" are different from the rest, displaying none of the team spirit the school tries to encourage. Years after Sandy and the others have moved on to the Senior School (where Miss Brodie does not teach) and into the world, Miss Mackay has an appointment with Sandy in which she regrets the fact that "it's still going on", that is, that Miss Brodie is training another group of young girls who will come to think they are better than the other girls. Miss Brodie is betrayed by Sandy as Miss Mackay is told of her penchant for fascist politics (previously, Miss Mackay had tried and failed to get rid of Miss Brodie by catching her in some kind of sex scandal) which, at a school like this one, will not be tolerated by the parents. She then is fired, and she suspects that it was Mary who betrayed her, even though it was Sandy.

In the novel, Miss Brodie dies of cancer in 1946.

The play and film show marked departures from the novel. Being adapted for stage and screen by Jay Presson Allen, the story is told in a largely linear fashion. It begins in 1932, after Miss Brodie has returned from her summer holidays in Italy, having realized her prime is upon her. The essentials of the character and the story are the same, though some characters are different or meet different ends. Mary MacGregor, for example, does not die in a hotel fire that happens years after graduation, but she is killed while in her final year at Marcia Blaine, when she goes to join her brother who is fighting in the Spanish Civil War. She dies when the train on which she is travelling is blown up.

In the play, we see a few scenes showing Sandy in later life as a nun. In the film, we do not know what becomes of Sandy or any of the other girls after graduation. Whereas in the book, Miss Brodie is betrayed by Sandy after she and the girls have all left school, the play and film put the betrayal before graduation and before the end of the school year. Sandy's betrayal is done in response to the death of Mary MacGregor.

== Calvinism ==
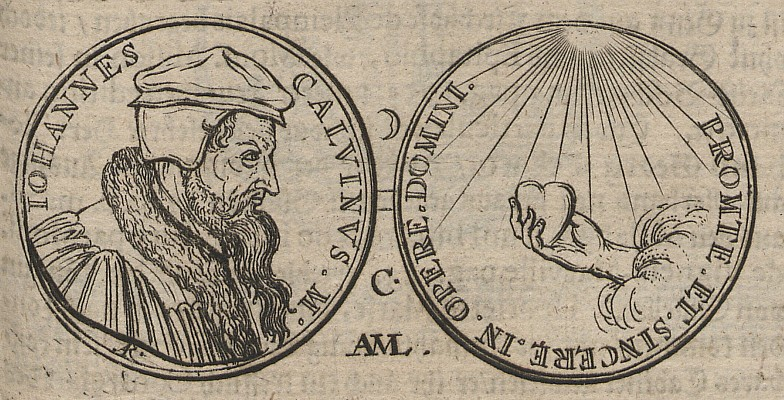
Medal of John Calvin, with the Divine Hand holding a heart

Most literary critics agree that Miss Brodie was written as a representation of "the God of John Calvin", and there are indeed many similarities between her and the Calvinist portrayal of God. In the story, she selects a handful of girls from her class to become "her girls." The girls are not chosen for any particular reason, but simply because they are "her favourites." This is strikingly similar to the Calvinist teaching of Unconditional election (Elects) which teaches God chooses His Elect to go to Heaven, based on "God's will" rather than any reflection of the person's character. Indeed, Miss Brodie attempts to transform these girls into the "crème de la crème", again similar to the Calvinist teaching that the Elect will be moulded into God's image.

The most striking similarity, however, is the way Miss Brodie attempts to predestine the lives of her girls and those around her. She is determined that one of her girls become the lover of the school's art master as her proxy, and seeks a way to make this happen. Another incident involves her encouraging a girl in her class to run to Spain and fight for the Nationalists in the Spanish Civil War, which results in her death from the bombing of her train. This compares with the Calvinist teaching of Predestination; that God has already set out a path for everybody. One of her girls, Sandy Stranger, notices this similarity, saying:

She thinks she is Providence ... She thinks she is the God of Calvin, the Beginning and End.

Ultimately, Miss Brodie's attempts to be the Calvinist God drive Sandy to the Roman Catholic Church. This is similar to Muriel Spark's experience of converting to Catholicism after growing up in Calvinist-dominated Edinburgh.

In the climactic scene of the film, Miss Brodie is confronted by Sandy, and she is pointedly told that she is "not good for people, and children should not be exposed to you." Realizing she has no hope of appealing her dismissal, Miss Brodie can do nothing, but call "Assassin! Assassin!" after Sandy as she walks away. Miss Brodie states she will be transported to Australia for radicalism. The film closes poignantly with a shot of Sandy tearfully walking along after graduation as we hear a voice-over of Miss Brodie saying "Little girls, I am in the business of putting old heads on young shoulders, and all my pupils are the creme de la creme. Give me a girl at an impressionable age, and she is mine for life!"

== Fascism ==
Miss Brodie is described as a "born fascist" by one of her girls. An active teacher while fascism was gaining popularity in Europe, she openly admires Benito Mussolini and praises him in her class. She frequently tours Italy, returning inspired by what she sees as Utopia. When Adolf Hitler becomes Chancellor of Germany, she changes her holiday destination to Berlin, believing Hitler's brownshirts to be more organized than Mussolini's blackshirts. When Sandy meets Miss Brodie for tea in the Braid Hills Hotel in 1946, Miss Brodie concedes that "Hitler was rather naughty." Her advocacy of fascism comes into play when she persuades a troublesome girl to fight for Francisco Franco, which ultimately leads to tragedy.

== Reference in later works ==
The character Domenica Macdonald in the 44 Scotland Street series by Alexander McCall Smith, taking place in contemporary Edinburgh, is compared to Jean Brodie by another character in the book (but sharing none of Brodie's attraction to fascism) and critics noted the comparison. McCall Smith also cites the book as one of his favourite humorous books.

== Portrayals ==
Miss Brodie was portrayed by British actress Dame Maggie Smith in the 1969 film adaption of the novel, The Prime of Miss Jean Brodie. Smith's portrayal earned her the Academy Award for Best Actress at the 42nd Academy Awards in 1970.

Vanessa Redgrave played Miss Brodie in a 1966 theatrical adaption of the novel in London. When the play moved to Broadway in 1968, Miss Brodie was portrayed by Zoe Caldwell, who won a Tony Award for her role.

In 2003 Siobhan Redmond took on the role in Muriel Romanes' production at the Royal Lyceum Theatre, Edinburgh and the Theatre Royal, Glasgow.

Gayle Rankin played Jean Brodie for a 2026 theatrical tour, adapted from the novel by David Harrower and directed by Vicky Featherstone for the National Theatre of Scotland and Royal Lyceum Theatre.
