= James Gillespie's High School =

Coordinates: 55°56′12.20″N 3°12′1.62″W

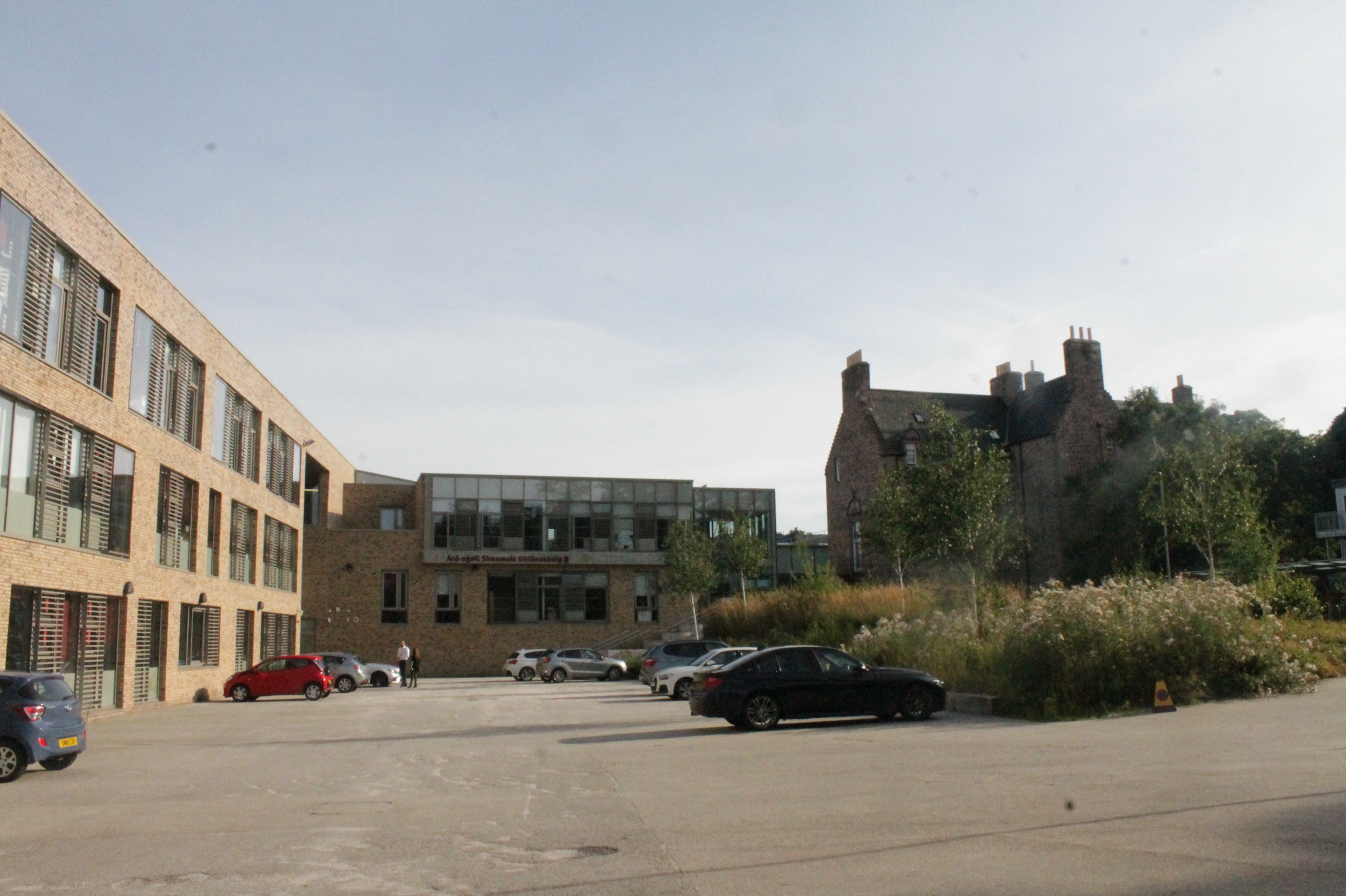

Location
- 57 Lauderdale Street; Edinburgh, EH9 1DD; Scotland

Information
- Type: State school
- Motto: Fidelis Et Fortis (Latin: Faithful and Brave)
- Established: 1803; 223 years ago
- Founder: James Gillespie
- Local authority: Edinburgh City
- Department for Education URN: 5533139 Tables
- Head teacher: Neil McCallum
- Staff: FTE 116.4 (2021)
- Gender: Mixed
- Age: 11 to 18
- Enrolment: 1524 (2019)
- Website: http://www.jamesgillespies.co.uk

James Gillespie's High School (Scottish Gaelic: Àrd-sgoil Sheumais Ghilleasbuig) is a state-funded secondary school in Marchmont, Edinburgh, Scotland. It is a comprehensive high school, educating pupils between the ages of 11 and 18, situated at the centre of Edinburgh. Edinburgh Castle and Holyrood Palace are within the catchment area of James Gillespie's High School.

== History ==
James Gillespie's High School was founded in Bruntsfield Place in 1803 as a result of the legacy of James Gillespie, an Edinburgh tobacco merchant, and was administered by the Merchant Company of Edinburgh. The school acknowledges Gillespie's links to the North Virginia slave trade and, in keeping with best practice, educates students about slavery in its various forms.

The original building was designed by Edinburgh architect Robert Burn.

In 1870, the school moved into a larger building on the south side of what is now Gillespie Crescent. The number of students at the school would later exceed 1,000 and include female students.

In 1908, the Edinburgh School Board took responsibility for this school from the Merchant Company of Edinburgh Education Board.

In 1914, the school moved into the original Boroughmuir School building on Bruntsfield Links, which was previously used by Boroughmuir High School as an annex. The novelist Muriel Spark attended James Gillespie's High School from 1923 to 1935. She based the main character of her 1961 novel The Prime of Miss Jean Brodie on one of her teachers, Christina Kay.

In 1935, Edinburgh Corporation acquired Bruntsfield House and its grounds from the Warrender family.

The construction of the school on Lauderdale Street began in 1964 and was completed in 1966. The school became a secondary school for 800 girls. The project added three teaching blocks, a separate library, a swimming pool, and a gymnasium to the original Bruntsfield House building.

In 1973, the school became a co-educational comprehensive school, taking in boys and girls.

In 1978, ownership of the school was taken over by Lothian Regional Council, and school uniforms became optional. At this time, the school also started to use an annex at 7 Gillespie Street to cope with the rising intake.

In 1989, the school moved to one site at the completion of an extensive building and modernisation program. Prior to the move, the high school divided the student population into four 'houses' — Warrender, Roslin, Spylaw, and Gilmore. The houses would compete in intramural sports events, etc. The house system lasted into the early 1980s before being reformed into three 'communities' - Raeburn, Maxwell and Kyi. In 2016 further reform took place. The previous three 'communities' were abolished and five new ones were established - Roslin, Spylaw, Warrender, Thirlestane and Lauder. In August 2021, due to rising pupil numbers, a further revision was made and as of then, the communities have been Roslin, Spylaw and Lauder. Since the 1980s, buildings on the high school campus have adopted the house names along with the addition of a new name, Bruntsfield. Each of the building names reflects a connection to the name of a locality in, or a historic family from, South Edinburgh.

In 2007, improvements were made to the school buildings after a state inspection found significant deficiencies in several of the 1966 structures. There was a campaign to build a new school. Following consultation with parents, students, staff, and the wider community, building of a new school began on the existing site in December 2013.

In July 2013, work started to replace all the school buildings apart from Bruntsfield House, which is a listed building. The campus was completed in August 2016 and was officially opened by John Swinney, the Deputy First Minister, on 26 October 2016. As of October 2016, it was composed of four buildings: the Bruntsfield House, the Malala Teaching Block, the Muriel Spark Performing Arts Building, and the Eric Liddell Sports Building. In mid-2019, a small set of temporary units serving as a Humanities building were built to better space out these subjects.

In October 2022, Darroch Annexe in the nearby Fountainbridge area of the city opened after it was refurbished. The school will use the facility for additional classes as it provides an additional 12 classrooms, a canteen, and a sports hall. It will also become the home of Gaelic Medium Education at JGHS, and SQA exams are also held there.

== Gaelic language unit ==
There is a Gaelic language unit within the school, catering for around 120 pupils, which allows those students who have been taught through the medium of Gaelic in Primary School (Bun-sgoil Taobh na Pàirce) to continue with their Gaelic Medium Education.

== Notable alumni ==
- Robert Cavanah, Scottish actor
- Ronnie Corbett, stand-up comedian, actor, writer and broadcaster
- Dorothy Dunnett, novelist
- Stuart Harris, architect and local historian
- Sam Heughan, Scottish actor
- Ethel Houston, Enigma code breaker & first woman to become senior partner at a Scottish law firm.
- Damien Hoyland, rugby player
- Kirstin Innes, writer
- Ellen King, swimmer
- John Leslie, television presenter on Blue Peter, Wheel of Fortune and This Morning
- Elizabeth Malloch, educator and priest
- William McRae, botanist and mycologist
- Annie Hutton Numbers, Scottish chemist
- Alistair Sim, actor
- Callum Skinner, Olympic cyclist: Callum won a Silver(individual sprint) and a Gold (Team sprint) medal at the Summer Rio Olympic Games 2016
- Muriel Spark, writer
- Grant Stott, Scottish television and radio presenter
- Nazli Tabatabai-Khatambakhsh, artistic director
- Michael Thomson (actor), Scottish actor
