= Edward Calvert (architect) =

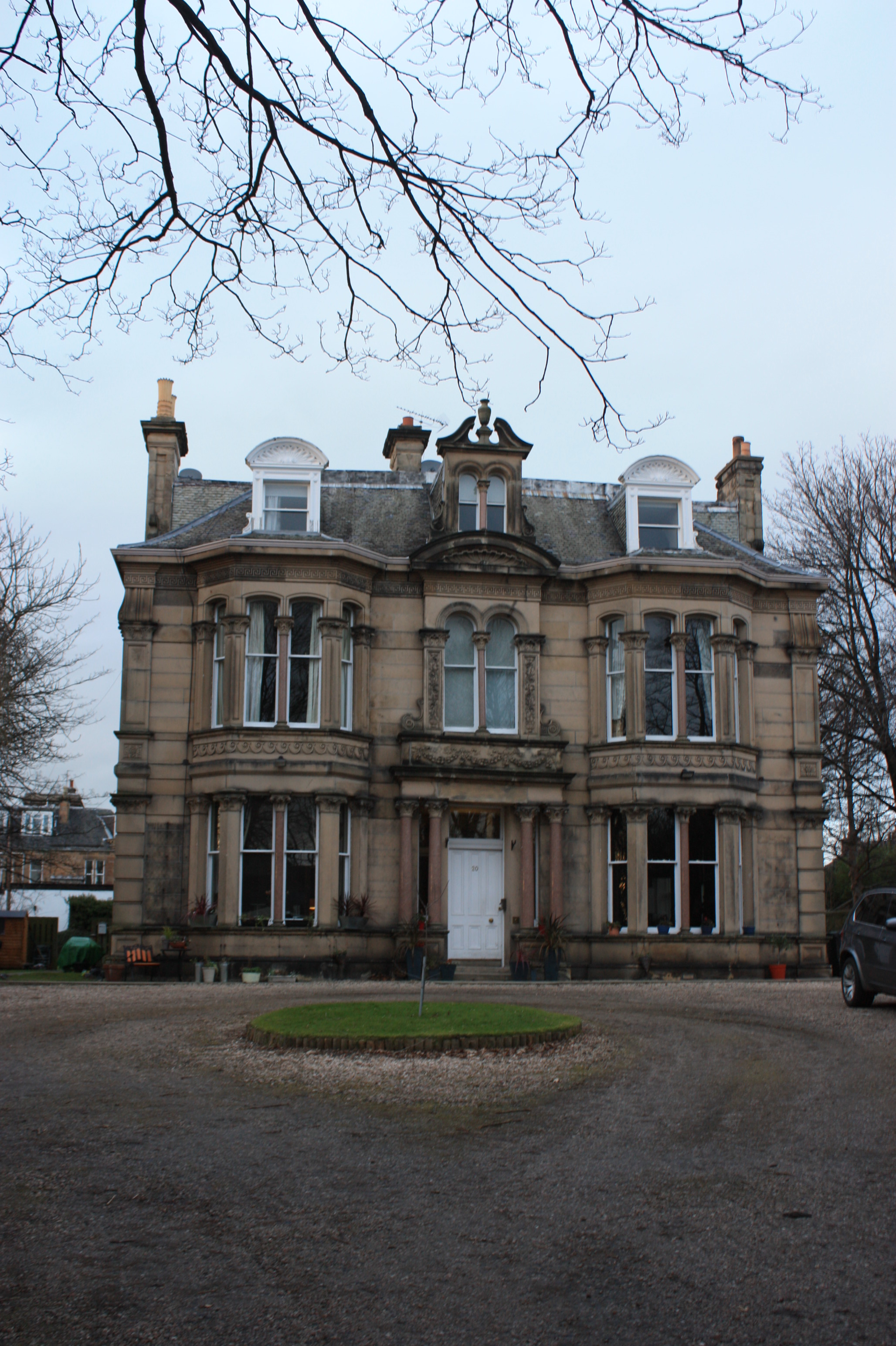
20 Colinton Road by Calvert

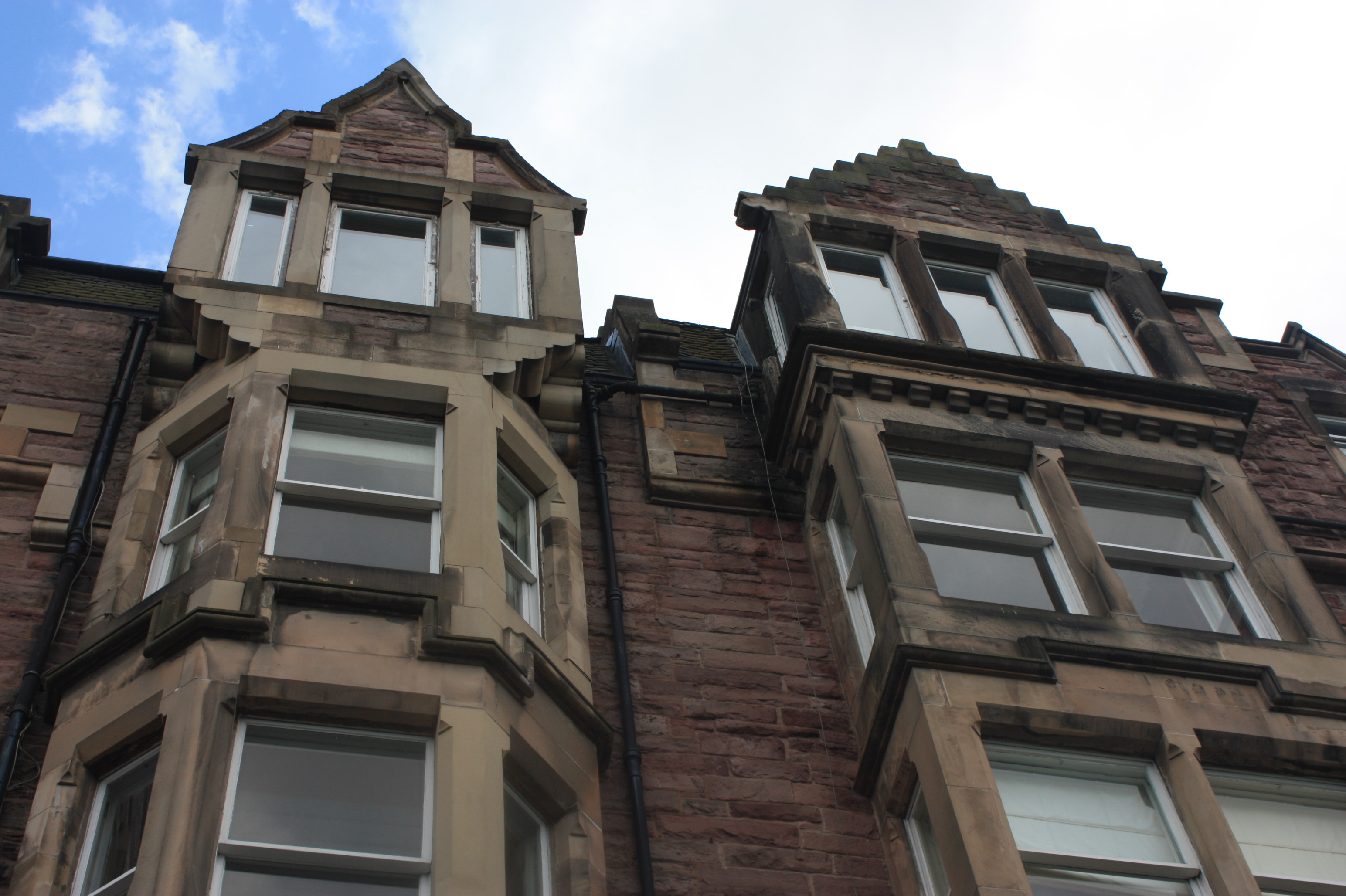
Details on Warrender Park Terrace, Edinburgh

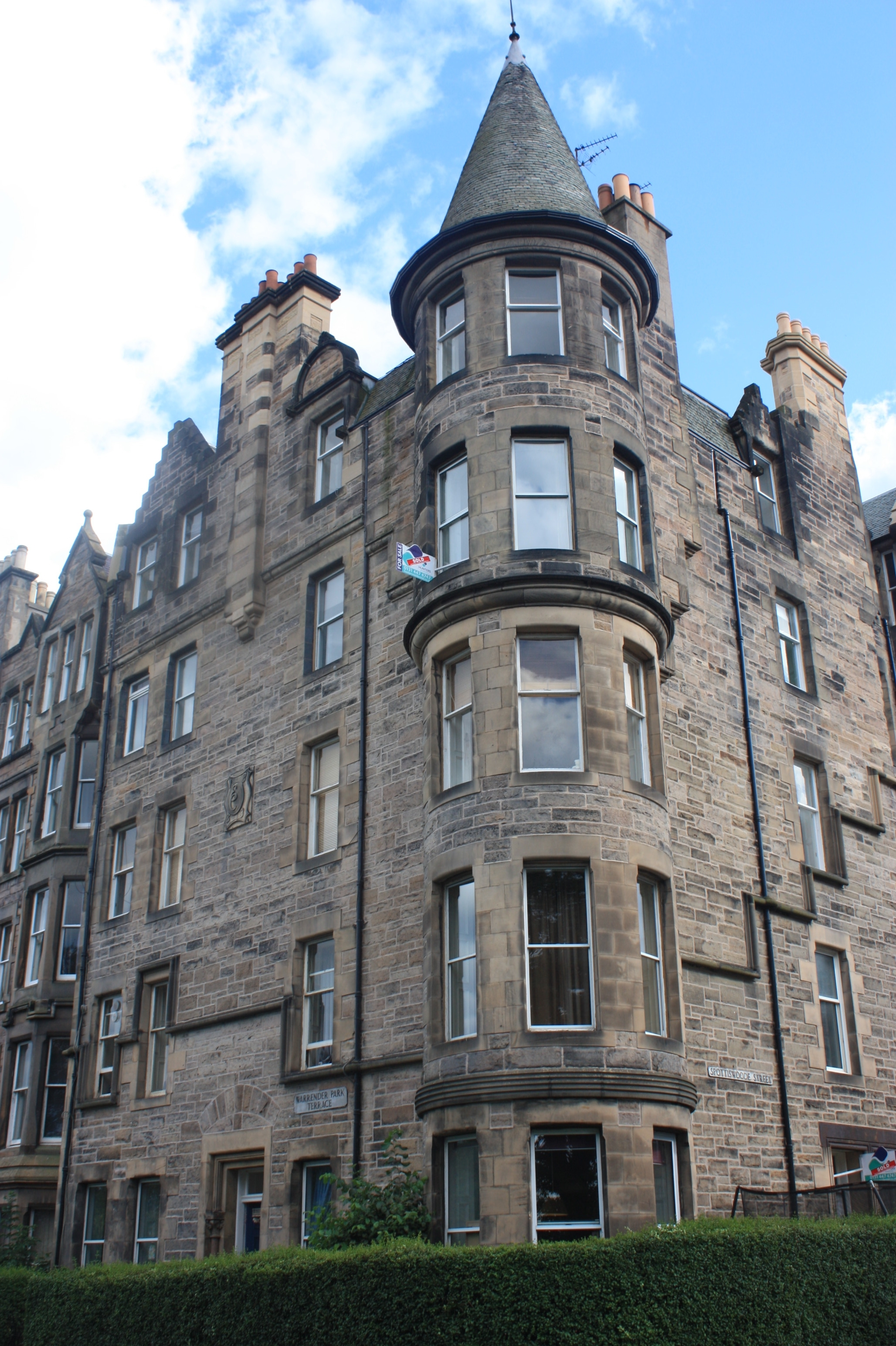
Calvert tenement, Marchmont

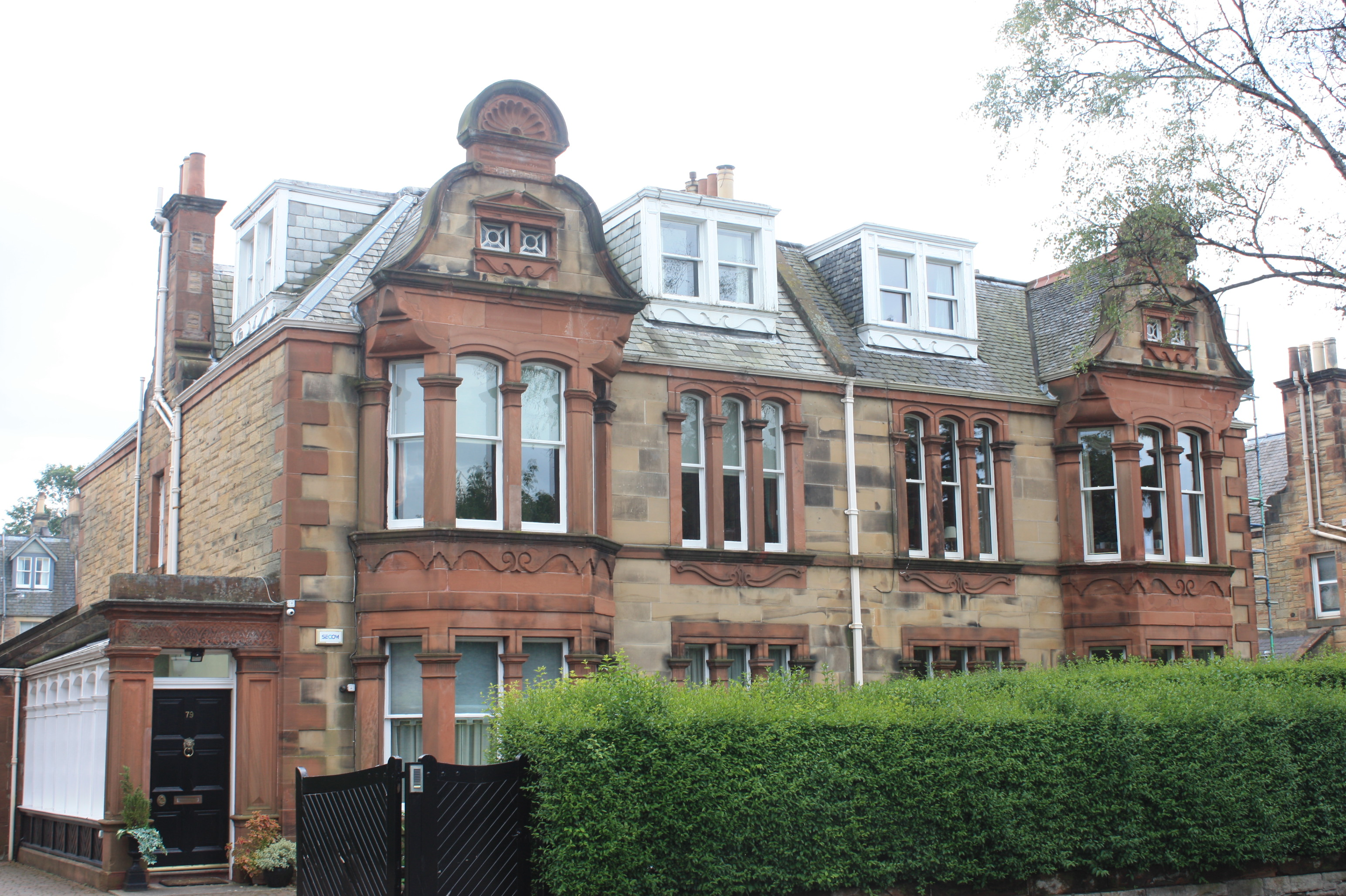
79 & 81 Colinton Road, Edinburgh

Edward Calvert (March 1847 – 26 June 1914) was a Scottish domestic architect.

Calvert's work appears to have been exclusively confined to Edinburgh, and was mostly concerned with the creation of Baronial tenements (particularly in Marchmont) and villas in the Second Empire and Jacobean styles. He is responsible for a varied selection of villas on or in the vicinity of Colinton Road in Merchiston; one of these was for many years the home of author Dorothy Dunnett. He is also known to have designed modifications for at least one New Town building, in Abercromby Place, in 1899.

== Life ==
Calvert was born in Brentford, Middlesex in March 1847, the son of William Calvert, a corn and coal merchant and his wife Esther Roberts.

He trained as an architect under Frederick Thomas Pilkington.

His work appears to be exclusively limited to domestic architecture in Edinburgh and was largely also done in partnership with the builder Peter Craig Renton. Much of his work (especially in Marchmont) shows strong stylistic influence from Sir James Gowans.

He died at his home, 80 Willowbrae Road, Edinburgh and is buried in the Grange Cemetery.

== Works ==
=== Villas ===
- 3 Ettrick Road (1885)
- 20, 22, 38, and 40 Colinton Road (1888)
- 30 Polwarth Terrace (1891)
- Paired villas (120/122), and terrace 80–110 Polwarth Terrace (1893)
- 79/81, 83/85, and 87/89 Colinton Road (1902–04)
- 11 and 13 John Street, Portobello (1904)

=== Tenements ===
- Parsons Green Terrace (1878)
- 56–66 Marchmont Crescent (1881)
- 1–23 (inclusive) Warrender Park Terrace, 2–16 Marchmont Road, and 2–8 Spottiswoode Street (1881–83)
- 158–174 Bruntsfield Place (1887)
- 2–16 Marchmont Road (1890)
- Viewforth Square (1891)
- 39–77 Slateford Road (1898)
- Brighton Mansions, 46–56 Bath Street, Portobello (1899)
- Windsor Mansions, 1–11 Straiton Place, Portobello (1899)
