= George Drever =

Scottish communist and volunteer in International Brigades

- Born: 31 March 1910
- Died: 1996 (aged 85–86)
- Military career
- Allegiance: Spanish Republicans
- Branch: International Brigades
- Rank: Rifleman
- Units: British Bn, 15th International Bde in Spain
- Conflicts: Belchite

George Drever (31 March 1910 – 1996) was a Scottish communist and volunteer with the International Brigades in the Spanish Civil War.

== Early life, education, work, communism ==
Drever was born on 31 March 1910 in Leith, one of eleven children of an Orcadian couple, dock labourer George Drever and his wife Louisa née Balfour. He lived at 41, Ferry Road, Leith was schooled at Leith Academy and passed Scottish Highers in English, Maths, Science (Chemistry & Physics) and became Dux in 1928. Despite his poor home background he was admitted to study pure science at the University of Edinburgh and graduated with a B.Sc in chemistry with First Class Honours and completed a Ph.D. Then he was working for Imperial Chemical Industries in Manchester as a research chemist, before being made redundant, which he claimed was due to his political activism as a communist in 1937. On returning from Spain, he did obtain work as a metallurgist for the English Steel Corporation in Sheffield. He spent some time teaching in the National Council of Labour Colleges.

When he first volunteered for overseas service in the cause of anti-fascism, he was declared as 'too important to lose' to the UK communists.

== Volunteering for the International Brigades ==
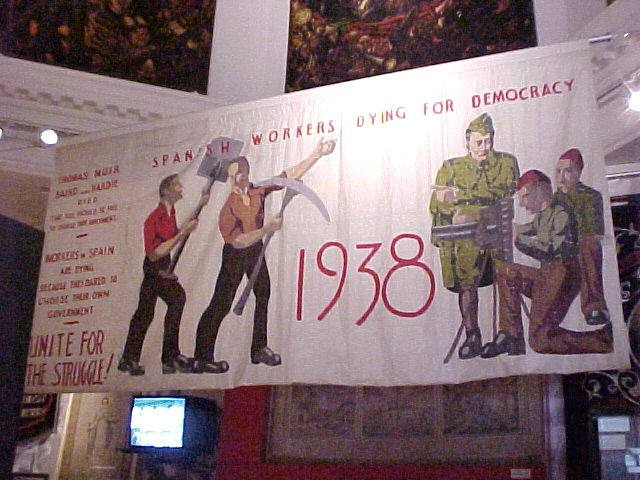
Banner calling Scottish workers to support the Spanish Civil War

Drever was one of around 500 Scottish volunteers who went to Spain in 1937 to fight for the Republicans and the working class struggle against fascism. Although Drever did recognise that a revolution to full communist governance at the same time as a war against the fascists would not be achievable (as proposed by POUM)

He had been a working class communist/socialist and although unfit for normal military service was willing to fight for this cause. He had originally volunteered for Abyssinia when invaded by Mussolini but his service was refused. Through the local communist party Drever heard the call for 'our best comrades' to go to Spain, and felt he was one of these 'best' to go. He was given a rail ticket and did not tell his parents or friends. He was 27 years old. His purpose was not just to fight fascism in Spain but to be trained in weapons ready for 'revolution' back at home. Drever was also one of those who were pragmatically aware that the Republican cause was unlikely to succeed, even before he left.

He was considered it strange that fellow communist thought he would not need to carry his own pack as a volunteer soldier, as he was from the educated classes.

The volunteers assembled at the London Communist Party HQ before arriving in Paris and sending his mother a postcard "don't worry'.

The group entered Spain secretly on foot through the Pyrenees and were greeted at Figueras by some hungry Republican soldiers and local people before travelling on by train to Tarazona for basic training.

In the battalion Drever was attached to first, the political attache was a Bob Cooney from Aberdeen. His first shock was the destruction of towns they marched through together such as Belchite, where he was posted with Jimmy Rutherford, a fellow Edinburgh volunteer from Newhaven whom he had known for couple of years through the Labour League of Youth and Communist Party at home and was a Spanish speaker. Their group got cut off for three days from the rest during a group tank attack and in the confusion came across the enemy and were taken prisoner with John Goldstein, another Spanish speaker from the battalion.

== Prisoner of war and return ==
The prisoners had really expected to be executed at once, but were taken by train to a prison camp at Valladolid, with only tinned fish, bread and figs to eat en route, at stopping points local women gave them water. That camp included Spanish deserters and international prisoners including Germans and Poles. The experience was grim with little food, poor sanitation and lice infestation. They were then moved to a larger camp at Burgos where the German Gestapo were selecting prisoners such as Jews and non Europeans, who were taken and never returned. His comrade Jimmy Rutherford, who had been in Spain before, despite being only 21 also expected to be chosen (as he had disobeyed an interdict on returning to Spain), and was indeed selected and executed. Jimmy's loss was mourned by his fisher community in Newhaven, and he was described as 'one of Scotland's National Heroes, who gave his life for an ideal'. Drever wrote in code to inform their Communist Party comrades in Edinburgh of his loss.

At his next prisoner camp in Palencia, Drever met other Scots like Donald McGregor, who was also dead by the time Drever was interviewed in 1986.

On return after 9 months imprisoned, with his family having been wrongly informed that he was killed in action, and memorials in Leith and his home area of Westray, Orkney, on his return there was celebration organised by Tom Murray at the Free Gardeners' Hall, Picardy Place and an article appeared in the Edinburgh Evening News.

Drever was said to feel some sort of 'survivor guilt', returning home before the battles were finished and some of fellow soldiers were killed. He was pleased that his mother did not repay the death insurance that had been claimed, although he had to pay his return fare from Spain to the British Government. He had trouble finding employment in any of the Edinburgh chemical firms (having been declared dead, as a known Communist) and so had to move to Sheffield. The British Special Branch did confirm in 1967 that 'blacklisting' had taken place in his case and his lack of career progress in both military and civilian life could be attributed to his beliefs and activism in the Spanish Civil War.

== Later recognition ==
Drever kept in touch with fellow volunteers in the International Brigade Association, attending gatherings in Spain and Germany. He was interviewed in the 1980s in a collection of personal stories from the Scottish International Brigade and his photograph hung in the National Galleries of Scotland.

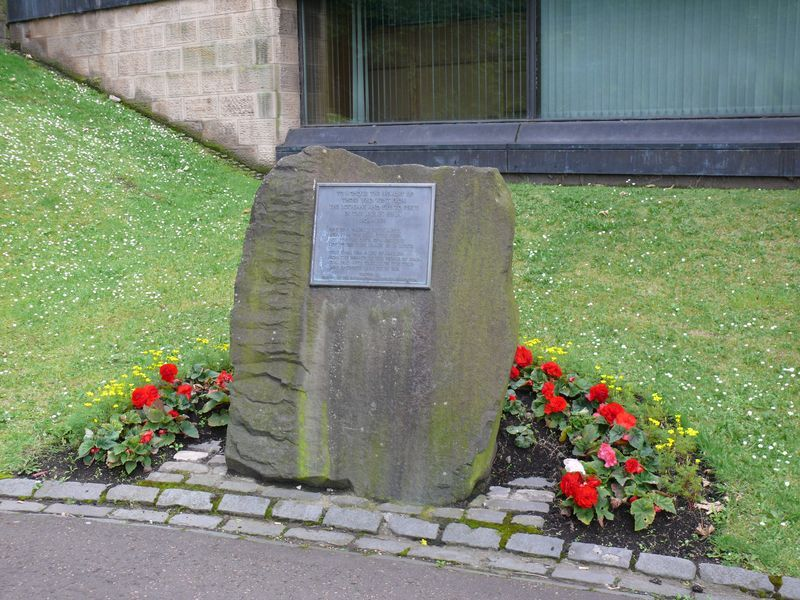
Memorial to Scottish international brigade volunteers in the Spanish Civil War; in Princes Street Gardens, Edinburgh

Drever also was in a group pictured for Glasgow Herald 5 December 1981 and in the National Galleries newsletter in 2009 with a photograph from 1986, when a memorial to volunteers was unveiled in Princes Street Gardens, Edinburgh.

His son David wrote to the National Galleries in 1986, that his family:

..have his death certificate, issued by the Republican government in Spanish, which was sent to my grandmother after he was lost in action. Also his obituary, as a well known Leith communist, appeared in local newspapers and in the Orkney Herald at the time (both his parents were from Westray). In addition a memorial meeting was held to celebrate his life - and no doubt to raise further funds for the struggle. The story had a happy ending and he turned up very alive and was repatriated after the fall of the Republic... ...Socialist politics remains the lifeblood of our family and his children and grandchildren are immensely proud of his part in one of the great democratic struggles of the 20th century.
