= Boroughmuir High School =

Public secondary school in Edinburgh, Scotland

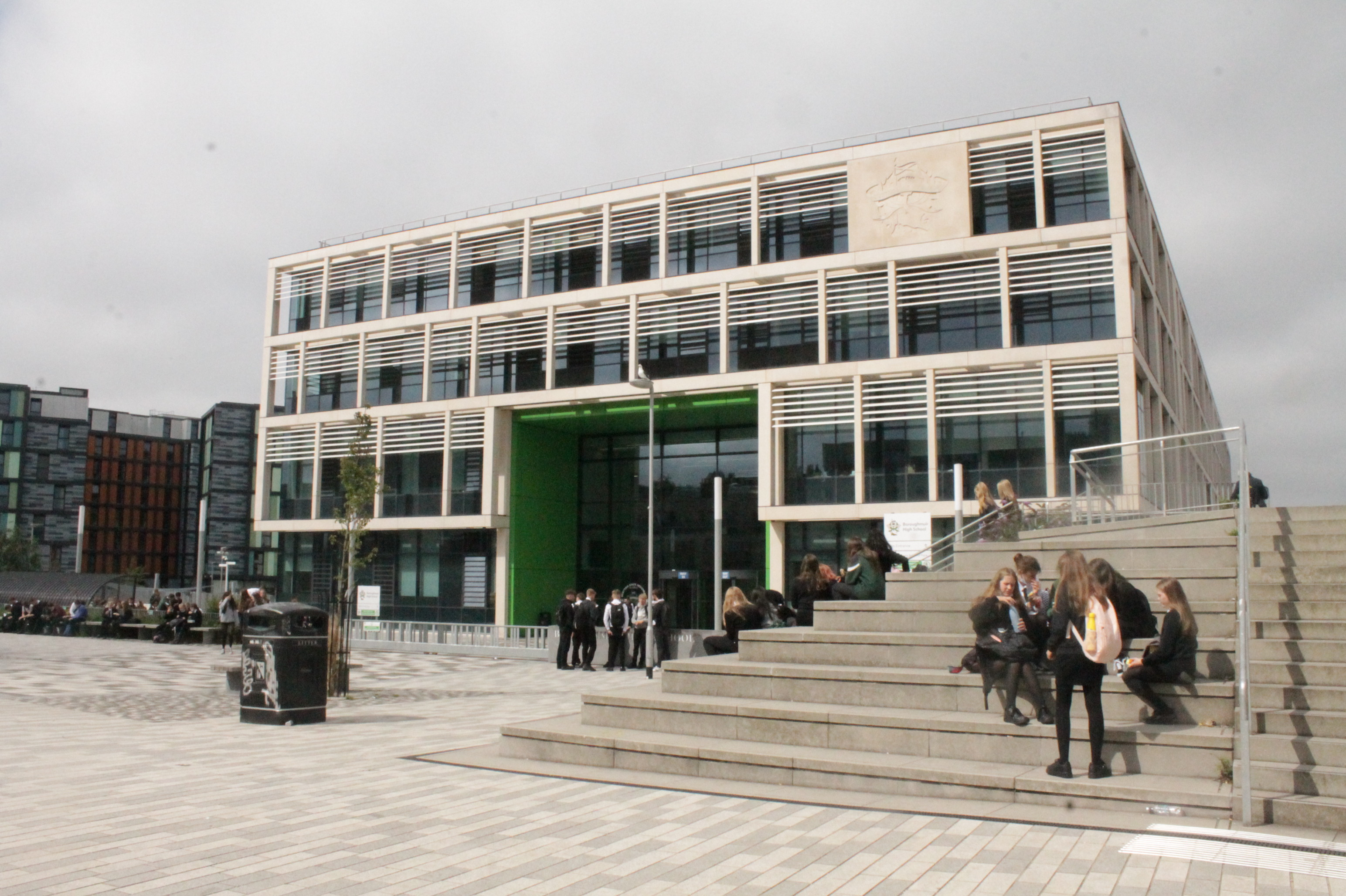

Location
- 111 Viewforth; Edinburgh, EH11 1FL; Scotland; 55°56′27.62″N 3°12′52.6″W

Information
- Motto: Justus et Tenax (Latin: "Just and Tenacious")
- Established: 1904
- Local authority: City of Edinburgh Council
- Headteacher: Kate Fraser
- Staff: 119
- Gender: Coeducational
- Age: 11 to 18
- Enrollment: 1530
- Houses: Westhall, Hartington, Viewforth, Leamington, Montpelier, Bruntsfield
- Colours: Green, navy and black
- Publication: The Crest Newspaper
- Website: https://boroughmuirhighschool.org

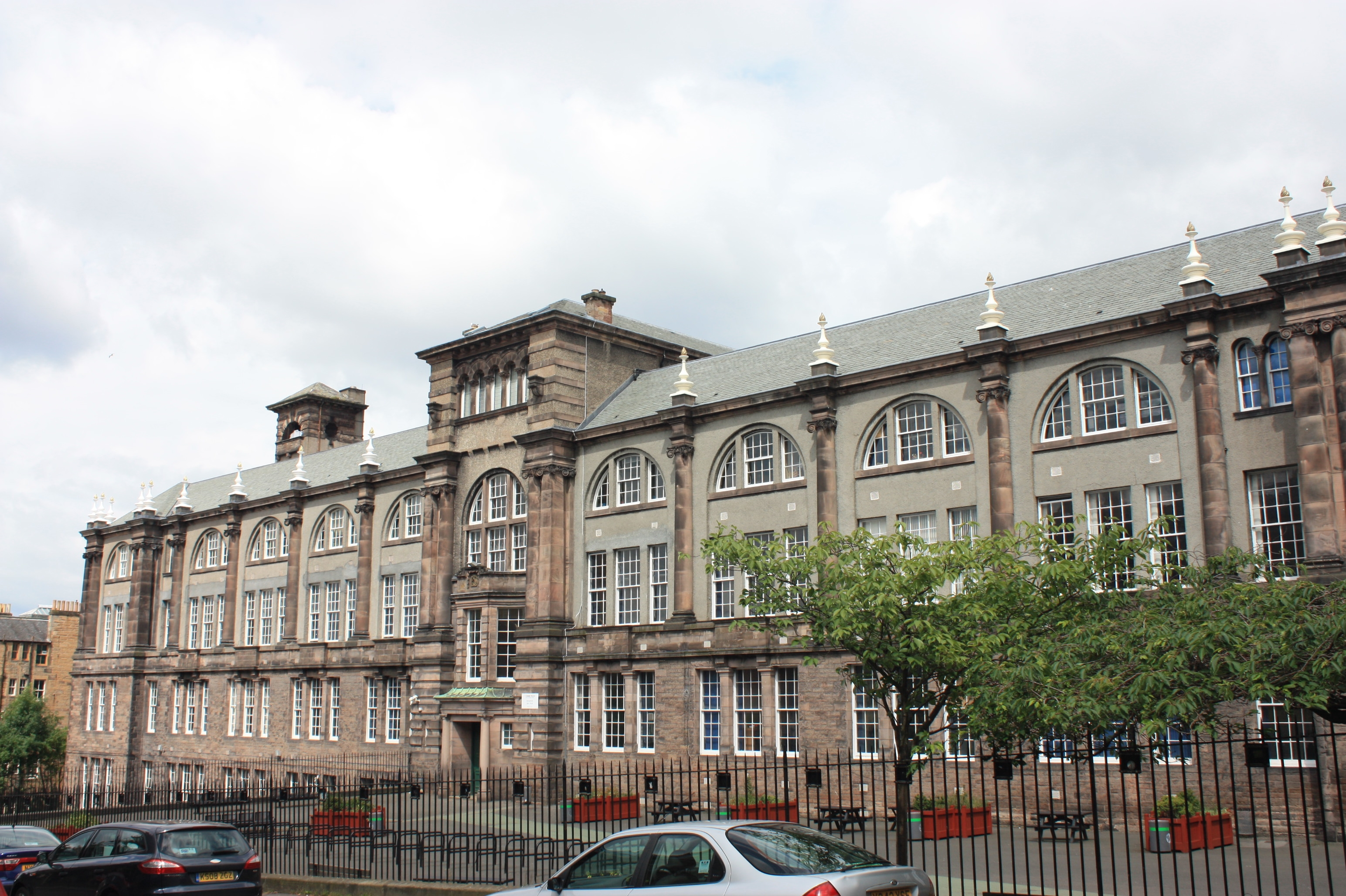
Old Boroughmuir High School - now converted to flats

Boroughmuir High School is a non-denominational secondary school in the Fountainbridge area of Edinburgh, Scotland.

== Buildings ==
The school was founded in 1904, and located at 22–24 Warrender Park Crescent, overlooking Bruntsfield Links in a building designed by John Alexander Carfrae, and remembered by Muriel Spark as "the school on the links". Built as Boroughmuir School, the building became James Gillespie's in 1913 when the new Boroughmuir on Viewforth was opened. After the new Gillespie's was opened, the building became Boroughmuir again as the "Junior School" housing first and second years. The building on the links is now University of Edinburgh student residences.

The school moved to a site at 26 Viewforth, also designed by Carfrae, from 1913 to 2018. Built as a "higher grade" school, the building was designed to accommodate over 1200 pupils in 40 classrooms. It was a large "8 block" centred around two quads (with a gymnasium at the lower ground floor), the perimeter corridor and surrounding classrooms had large tripartite windows and corridor windows facing the quad. Additional wings, dining halls, glazed roofs and mezzanine floors were added later as the school struggled for space. The school also used nearby St Oswalds Hall as an annexe.

In June 2018, the school moved to the new building at 111 Viewforth in Fountainbridge on the site of a demolished brewery. The new building was named the Building of the Year by the Edinburgh Architectural Association, and won the RIAS Award 2018 and RIBA Award for Scotland.

== Achievements ==
In 2011, Boroughmuir's exam results were the fourth best state school results in Scotland. It was also awarded State School of the Year in 2012 and 2018 by the Sunday Times.

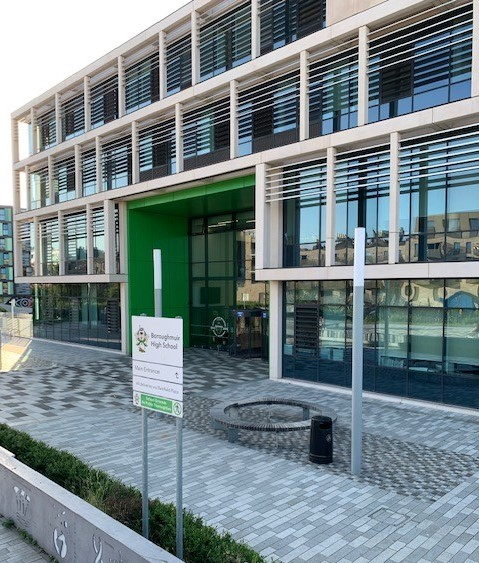
Boroughmuir High School new building

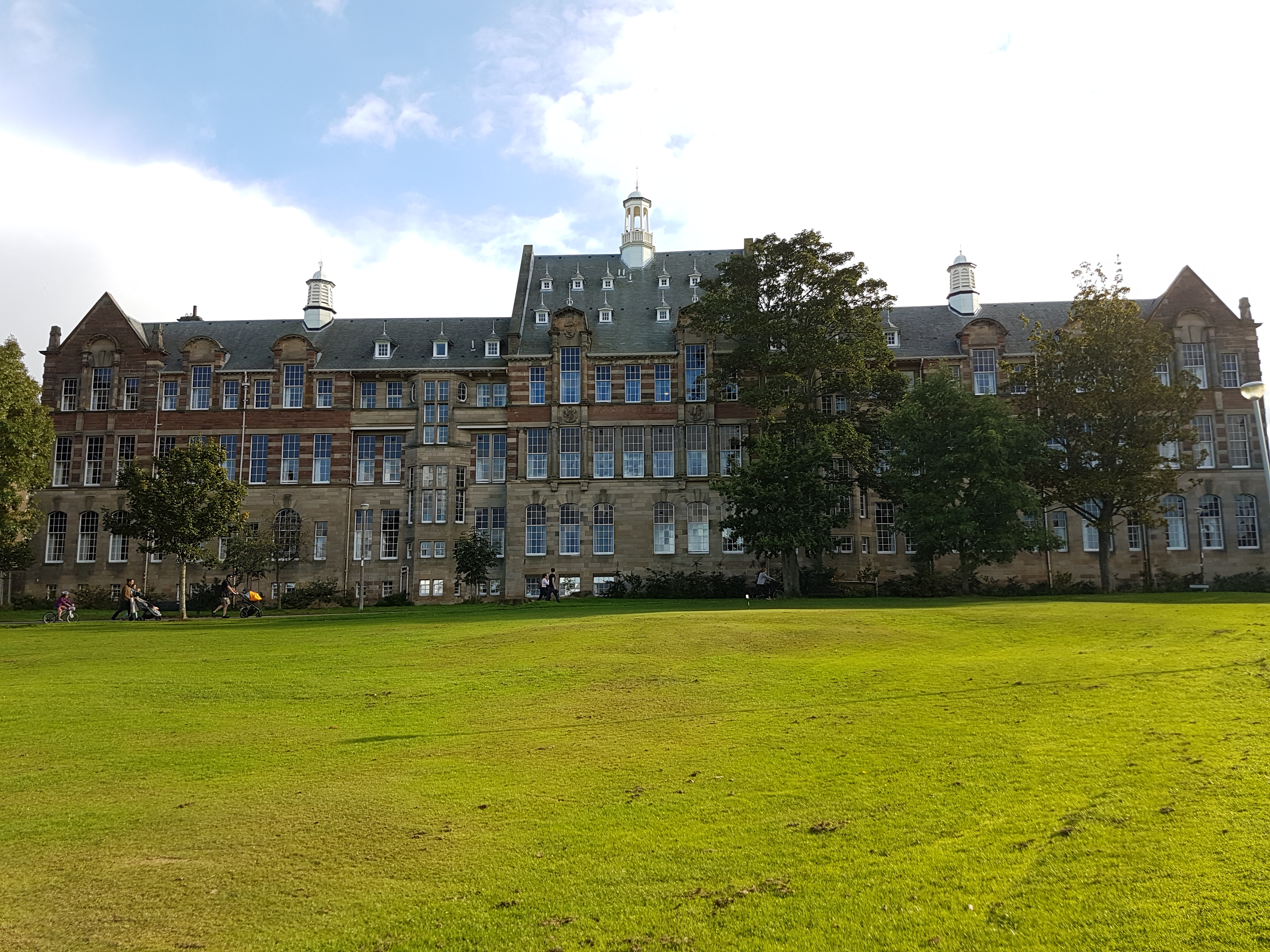
The School on the Links

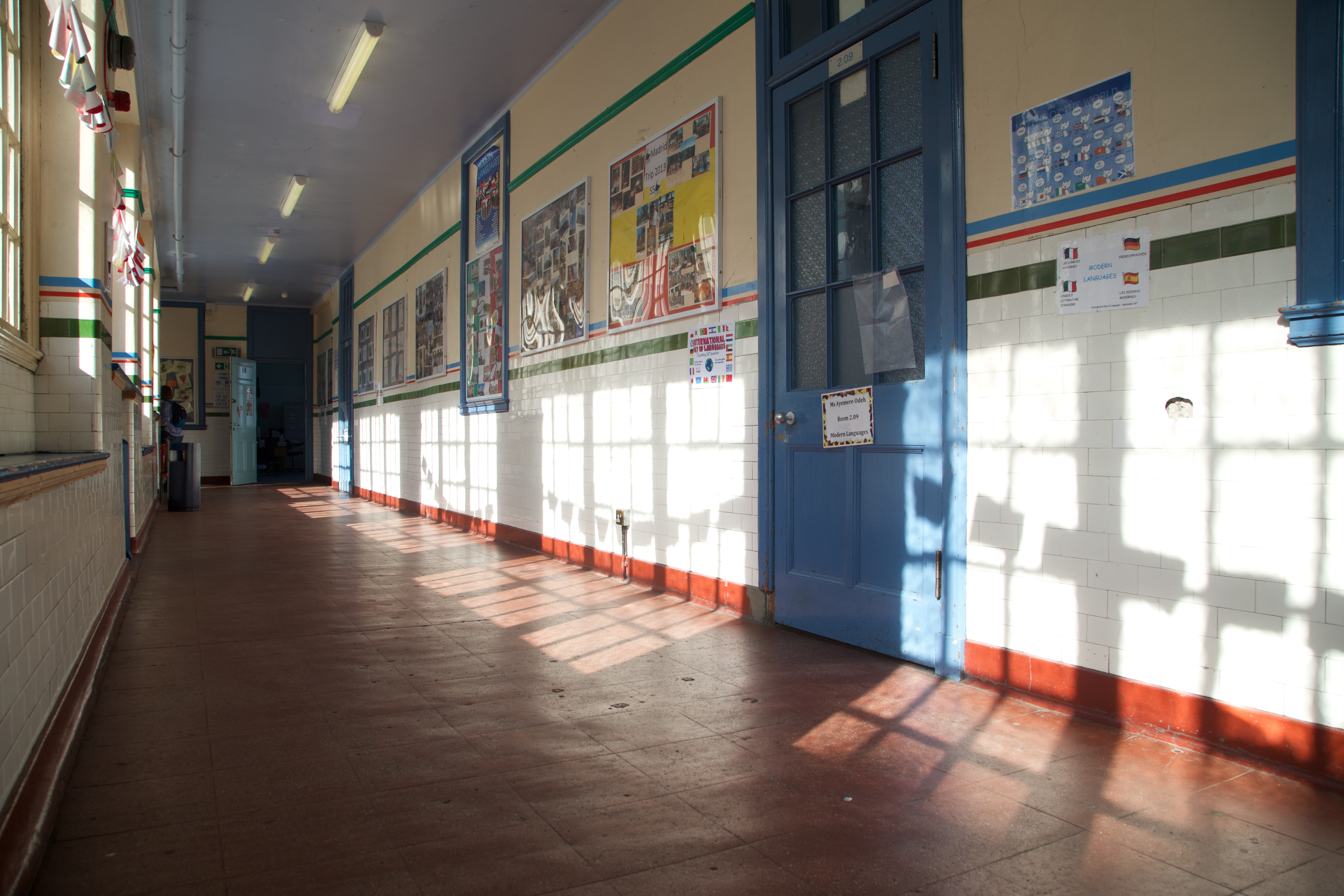
Corridors around the 'quads'

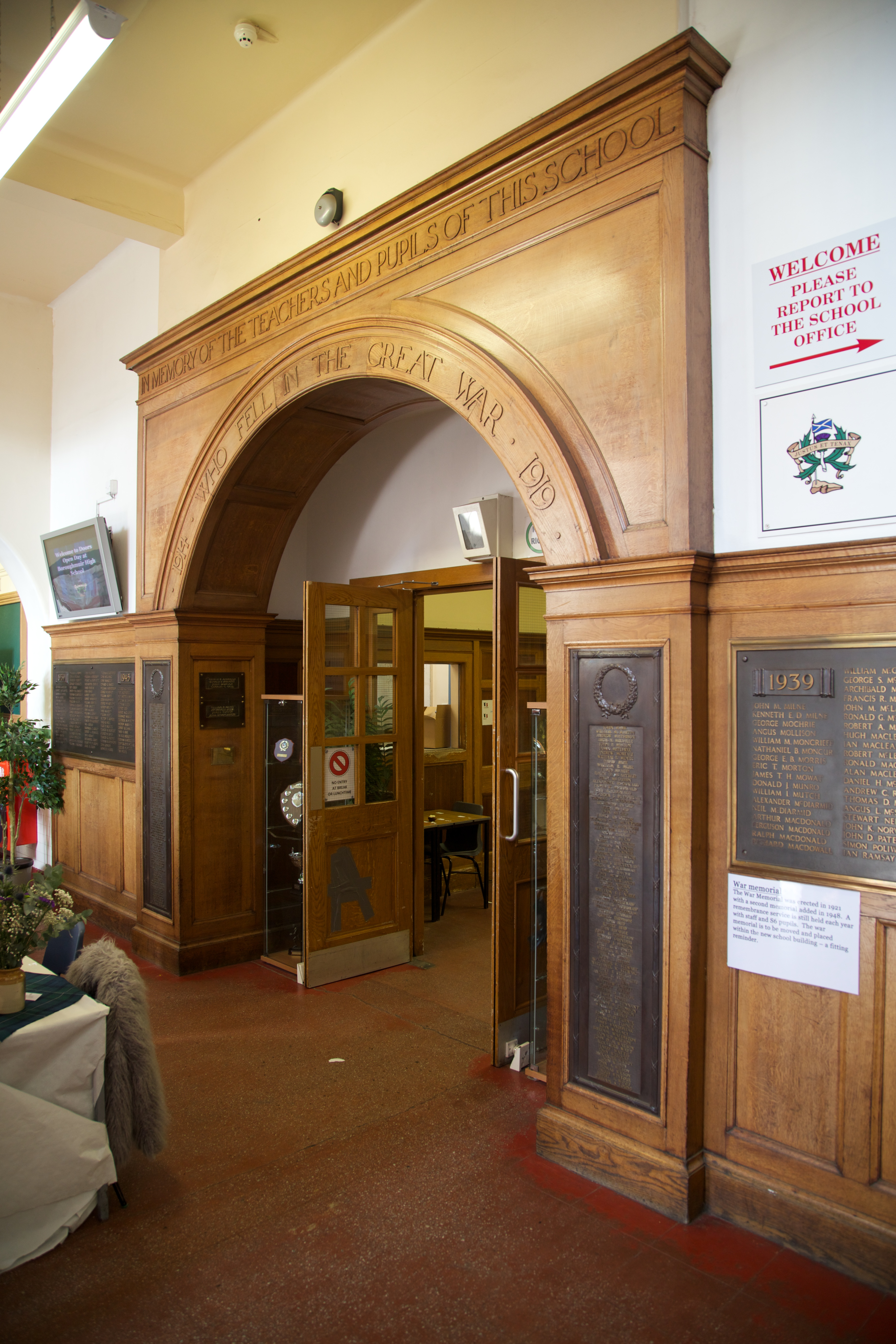
War Memorial Arch

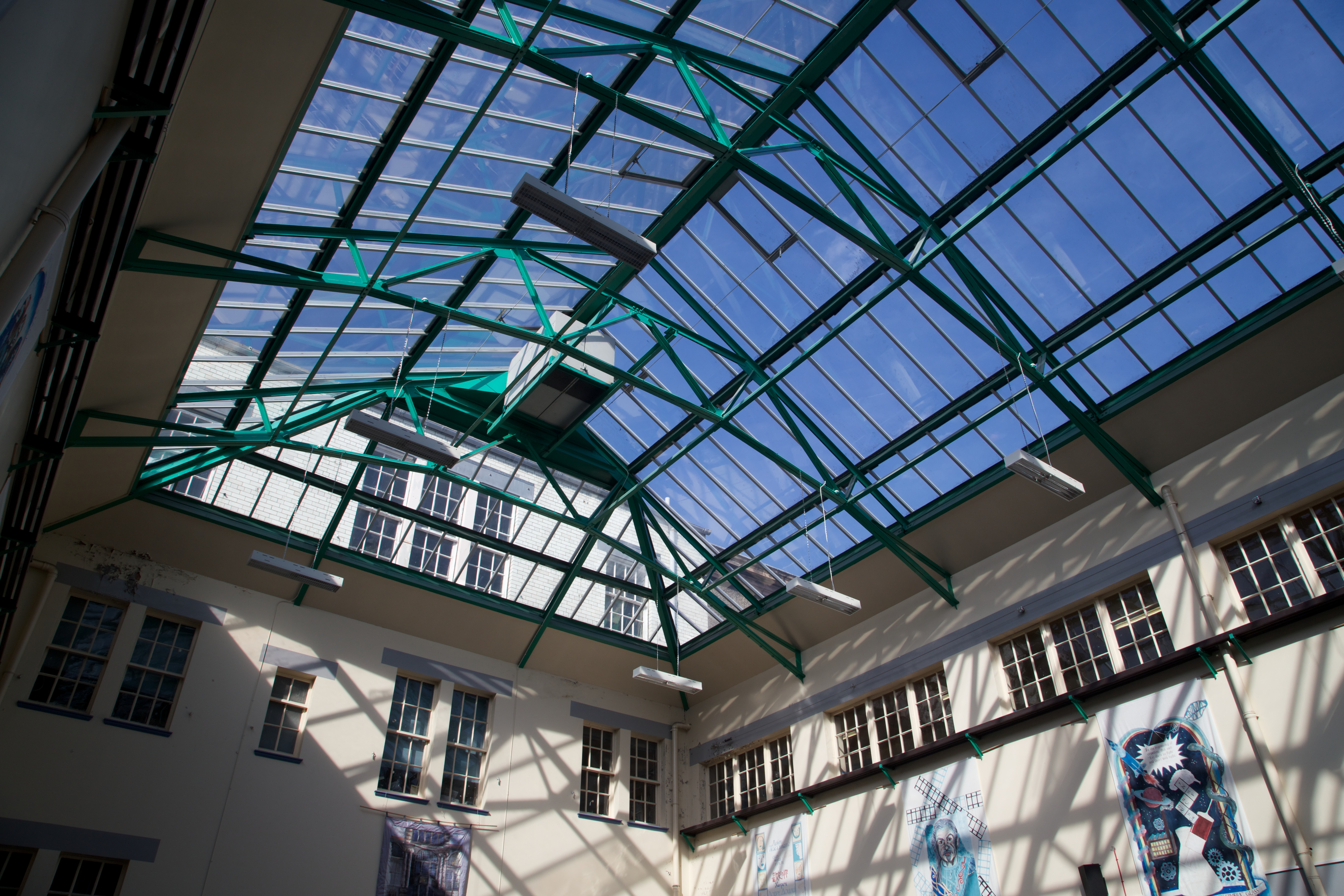
Glazed roof over the quad

== History ==
The school was opened by the Secretary of State for Scotland, Thomas McKinnon Wood in 1914. At the ceremony, he was heckled by a member of the Women's Suffrage Movement. According to reports "an elderly lady seized the opportunity and made her way to the front of the audience, producing a small bag of flour from her muff and, as she threw it on Mr McKinnon Wood, she asked 'Why do you torture women?'".

Lewis Romanis served as headteacher for 16 years from 1967 to 1982. He was succeeded by T.W. Dalgleish who headed the school until 2000. He was followed by Jack Hamilton until 2013. Kate Fraser became the first female head teacher of Boroughmuir High School in August 2024, succeeding David Dempster MBE (2013-2024)

The new school building was opened by the minister for Higher and Further Education and Science, Shirley-Anne Somerville accompanied by Councillor Adam McVey, leader of the City of Edinburgh Council

== War memorial ==
Three volumes of the Boroughmuir High School Magazine, including the Roll of Honour names of pupils who served and died in WW1, were digitised as part of the University of Oxford "lest we forget" project in 2018.

== Notable alumni ==
- Douglas Allan (geologist and director of the Royal Scottish Museum)
- Tommy Armour (golfer)
- Angus Beith (retired footballer)
- Ronnie Browne (founding member of The Corries)
- Dale Carrick (footballer who currently plays for Airdrieonians F.C.)
- Annette Crosbie (actress)
- William Cochran (physicist)
- Neil Cochrane (rugby player)
- Willie Duff (footballer)
- Jim Fleming (international referee)
- Ncuti Gatwa (actor, fifteenth Doctor Who)
- Christine Grahame (Scottish National Party politician)
- Richard Henderson (Nobel Prize-winning biologist)
- Drew Hendry (Scottish National Party politician)
- Robin M. Hochstrasser (scientist known for his work on molecular spectroscopy)
- Peter Hoffmann (born 1 July 1, 1956 is an Edinburgh author and former international sportsman)
- Neve McIntosh (actress)
- Pollyanna McIntosh (actress)
- Scott Robinson (footballer who currently plays for East Fife)
- Sarah Smith (journalist)
- Catherine Smith (Advocate General)
- Edward Stratton (artist)
- Tom Palmer (England national rugby union team player)
- George Taylor (botanist and director of Royal Botanic Garden Edinburgh)
- Alexander Trotman (CEO of Ford Motor Company)
- Harry Wattie (footballer)

== Former teachers ==
- Peter Comrie (mathematician)
- Tam Dalyell (Labour Party politician)
- Robin Harper (Green Party politician)
- George Robin Henderson (mathematician)
- Sorley MacLean (poet)
- Martin O'Neill (Labour Party politician)
- Samuel Robin Spark (artist)
- Anum Qaisar (Scottish National Party politician)
