= A Hard Day's Night (film) =

1964 film by Richard Lester

- British theatrical release poster
- Directed by: Richard Lester
- Screenplay by: Alun Owen
- Produced by: Walter Shenson
- Starring: The Beatles; Wilfrid Brambell
- Cinematography: Gilbert Taylor
- Edited by: John Jympson
- Music by: Musical Director: George Martin; Songs: Lennon–McCartney; George Harrison (Note: Although the film features Harrison's song "Don't Bother Me", he did not receive an onscreen credit for writing it.)
- Production companies: Walter Shenson Films; Proscenium Films
- Distributed by: United Artists
- Release dates: 6 July 1964 (Pavilion Theatre); 10 July 1964 (United Kingdom); 12 August 1964 (United States)
- Running time: 87 minutes
- Countries: United Kingdom; United States
- Language: English
- Budget: £189,000
- Box office: $14 million (equivalent to $145 million in 2025)

A Hard Day's Night is a 1964 musical comedy film directed by Richard Lester and starring the English rock band the Beatles – John Lennon, Paul McCartney, George Harrison and Ringo Starr – that was released during the height of Beatlemania. It was written by Alun Owen and originally released by United Artists. The musical soundtrack makes up the band's album of the same name. The film portrays a fictionalized 36-hour period in the lives of the group as they prepare for a television performance.

The film was a commercial and critical success and was nominated for two Academy Awards, including Best Original Screenplay. In 2004, Time magazine rated it as one of the 100 all-time greatest films. British critic Leslie Halliwell described it as a "comic fantasia with music; an enormous commercial success with the director trying every cinematic gag in the book" and awarded it a full four stars. The film is credited as being one of the most influential of all musical films, inspiring the Monkees' television show and pop music videos, and various other low-budget musical film vehicles starring British pop groups, such as the Gerry and the Pacemakers film Ferry Cross the Mersey (1964).

In 1999, the British Film Institute ranked it the 88th-greatest British film of the 20th century.

== Plot ==
The four Beatles, John Lennon, Paul McCartney, George Harrison and Ringo Starr evade a horde of fans while boarding a train for London to film a televised variety show concert. En route, they meet Paul's trouble-making Irish grandfather, John McCartney. Before arriving in London, the band entertains some schoolgirls and plays cards. They are accompanied by their strict manager Norm (loosely based on Brian Epstein) and his dim-witted assistant Shake (loosely based on Mal Evans). They are quickly driven from the station to a hotel and begin to feel confined. Norm brings each Beatle a pile of fan mail and tasks them with answering each letter, but they sneak out to party. Meanwhile, Paul's grandfather goes gambling at a casino that Ringo was invited to. While The Beatles are dancing at the party, Norm and Shake show up and angrily escort the lads out of the party because it was a private party. When they get back to the room, they found out that Paul's grandfather was at the casino and they go and get him back to the hotel.

The next day, Norm forces the group to attend a mundane cocktail reception where they tease reporters with comic and evasive answers to interview questions. At the TV studio for rehearsals for the variety show, the uptight producer is convinced that the group is plotting against him. After taking over the stage and coaxing a morose Ringo into playing "If I Fell", Norm tries to force them into a dressing room until show time, but they push through an emergency exit, head down a fire escape and cavort in a field until forced off by its caretaker. Back in the studio, they are separated when a woman thinks she recognises John but cannot recall who he is. George is mistaken for an actor, dragged into an advertising agent's office, and auditioned for a clothing advertisement, but offends the agent by telling him that he and his boys say nasty things about the agency's poster-girl when she comes on TV. The band returns to rehearse a second song and, after a quick trip to makeup, smoothly goes through a third before earning a break.

An hour before the final run-through, Ringo is cajoled into chaperoning Paul's grandfather to the studio canteen for tea. He takes issue with a book Ringo is reading and manipulates him into going out "parading" to experience life rather than reading about it in books. Ringo tries to have a quiet drink in a pub, takes pictures, walks alongside the River Thames, chats with a young boy skipping school, and rides a bicycle along a railway station platform. (Note: This scene was filmed at Crowcombe Heathfield on the West Somerset Railway) After being ejected from the pub for nearly injuring a parrot with a dart and accidentally causing a woman to fall into a newly dug hole at a construction site, Ringo is apprehended by a policeman. He is shortly joined by Paul's grandfather, who had triggered a ruckus attempting to sell Beatles photos with autographs he had forged. The grandfather antagonises the policemen at the station with Irish nationalist slogans before running back to the studio to tell the others about Ringo. Norm sends the other three Beatles to retrieve him, which leads to a Keystone Cops-style foot chase. Arriving back at the studio with only minutes to spare before airtime, the Beatles deliver a smashing performance to an audience of screaming, delirious fans. Immediately afterwards, a helicopter whisks the group away toward a "midnight matinée" engagement in Wolverhampton. Paul tosses the forged autographs out of the helicopter as it takes off.

== Cast ==
- John Lennon as a fictionalised version of himself
- Paul McCartney as a fictionalised version of himself
- George Harrison as a fictionalised version of himself
- Ringo Starr as a fictionalised version of himself
- Wilfrid Brambell as John McCartney, Paul's grandfather
- Norman Rossington as Norm, the Beatles' manager
- John Junkin as Shake, the Beatles' road manager
- Deryck Guyler as Police Sergeant
- Anna Quayle as Millie
- Victor Spinetti as T.V. Director
- Richard Vernon as Man on train, Johnson
- Edward Malin as Hotel Waiter
- Robin Ray as T.V. Floor Manager
- Lionel Blair as T.V. Choreographer
- Alison Seebohm as Secretary, Dolly, who works for Simon Marshall
- David Jaxon as Young boy, Charley, who Ringo encounters

=== Uncredited ===
- Kenneth Haigh as Simon Marshall
- Julian Holloway as Adrian, Simon's assistant
- John Bluthal as a car thief
- Michael Trubshawe as the casino manager
- Margaret Nolan as the buxom girl at the casino
- Pattie Boyd as Jean, a blonde schoolgirl on the train
- Prudence Bury as Rita, a brunette schoolgirl on the train
- Jeremy Lloyd as a nightclub dancer
- Charlotte Rampling as a nightclub dancer
- Phil Collins as a schoolboy watching the Beatles' TV performance
- Marianne Stone as Society Reporter at theatre
- Derek Nimmo as Leslie Jackson, the magician
- Douglas Millings as a disgruntled tailor for the Beatles
- Terry Hooper as casino croupier
- David Langton as actor in theatre

== Songs ==
The film's credits incorrectly state that all songs are composed by John Lennon and Paul McCartney – a portion of "Don't Bother Me", written by George Harrison, is heard during one scene. The instrumental versions were recorded by the George Martin Orchestra.

- "A Hard Day's Night" (opening credits)
- "I Should Have Known Better"
- "I Wanna Be Your Man" (sample)
- "Don't Bother Me" (Harrison) (sample)
- "All My Loving" (sample)
- "If I Fell"
- "Can't Buy Me Love"
- "And I Love Her"
- "I'm Happy Just to Dance with You"
- "Ringo's Theme (This Boy)" (instrumental)
- "A Hard Day's Night" (sample, instrumental)
- "Can't Buy Me Love" (reprise)
- "Tell Me Why"
- "If I Fell" (reprise)
- "I Should Have Known Better" (reprise)
- "She Loves You"
- "A Hard Day's Night" (reprise; closing credits)

In addition to the soundtrack album, an EP (in mono) of songs from the film titled Extracts From The Film A Hard Day's Night was released by Parlophone on 6 November 1964, having the following tracks:

- Side A
1. "I Should Have Known Better"
2. "If I Fell"
- Side B
1. "Tell Me Why"
2. "And I Love Her"

=== Song notes ===
- "I'll Cry Instead" was among several songs considered for the film but ultimately not included either as an on-camera performance or for usage as an audio-only track. It was to be used during the police chase sequence, but ultimately, director Richard Lester vetoed it in favour of the more lyrically upbeat "Can't Buy Me Love". Its status as an early contender for inclusion led to the song being included on the US soundtrack album, plus the mono "Something New" LP and Capitol 45. The song was recorded in two sections and was going to be featured in two parts, with the break being when the Beatles returned to the police station to catch their breath. The unique full-length version, which has a repeat of the first verse, was mixed as a rough mono mix and sent to United Artists and Capitol Records in North America. This "lost" section wasn't just an edit of the beginning of the song but a separate take (second "section" of the two-part recording). Eventually, the final mono and stereo mixes edit out this repeat of the first verse.
- In the 1982 US theatrical reissue of the film by Universal Pictures, under licence from Walter Shenson, the song "I'll Cry Instead" was used as the audio track for a prologue sequence to the film which consisted of stills from the film and publicity photographs as a tribute to Lennon consisting of a Swinging Sixties-style collage of photos of the Beatles in 1964 around the time they were shooting the film. The prologue was assembled without the involvement or knowledge of the film's director, Richard Lester, who subsequently expressed his disapproval of the addition. The prologue was not included on the 2000 restoration of the film.
- The song "You Can't Do That" was filmed as part of the film's TV concert sequence but was not included in the final cut of the film. At a point before a decision had been made to excise the song from the film, footage of that performance had been sent by the filmmakers and Brian Epstein to be aired on The Ed Sullivan Show as a tease to promote the forthcoming release of the film. The clip aired on the Sullivan Show on Sunday, 24 May 1964, in conjunction with an interview with The Beatles specially filmed by Sullivan in London. An extract of the footage of the song performance was included in the 1994 documentary The Making of "A Hard Day's Night".
- The song "I Call Your Name" was cut from the film for unknown reasons.

== Screenplay ==
The screenplay was written by Alun Owen, who was chosen because the Beatles were familiar with his 1959 play No Trams to Lime Street, and he had shown an aptitude for writing in the group's native Scouse dialect. McCartney commented, "Alun hung around with us and was careful to try and put words in our mouths that he might've heard us speak, so I thought he did a very good script." Owen spent several days with the group, who told him their lives were like "a train and a room and a car and a room and a room and a room"; Paul's grandfather refers to this in the dialogue. Owen wrote the script from the viewpoint that the Beatles had become prisoners of their own fame, their schedule of performances and recording having become punishing.

The script comments cheekily on the Beatles' fame. For instance, at one point, a fan, played by Anna Quayle, apparently recognises John Lennon, though she cannot put a name to the face, saying only "you are...". He demurs, saying his face is not quite right for "him"; after she puts on her glasses, she agrees that Lennon doesn't "look like him at all", and Lennon says to himself that "she looks more like him than I do". Other dialogue is derived from actual interviews with the Beatles; when Ringo is asked if he is a mod or a rocker, he replies: "Uh, no, I'm a mocker", a line derived from a joke he had made on the TV show Ready Steady Go! The frequent reference to McCartney's grandfather (Wilfrid Brambell) as a "clean old man" both refers to the Beatles being popularly called "very clean" and inverts the stock description of Brambell's character on the TV series Steptoe and Son as a "dirty old man".

Audiences also responded to the Beatles' brash social impudence. Director Richard Lester said, "The general aim of the film was to present what was apparently becoming a social phenomenon in this country. Anarchy is too strong a word, but the quality of confidence that the boys exuded! Confidence that they could dress as they liked, speak as they liked, talk to the Queen as they liked, talk to the people on the train who 'fought the war for them' as they liked. ... [Everything was] still based on privilege—privilege by schooling, privilege by birth, privilege by accent, privilege by speech. The Beatles were the first people to attack this... they said if you want something, do it. You can do it. Forget all this talk about talent or ability or money or speech. Just do it."

Although the original working titles of the film were first The Beatles and then Beatlemania, the group's name is never spoken in the film, although the name appears on Ringo's drum during the variety show.

== Production ==
The Beatles had met with Nat Cohen of Anglo Amalgamated about Anglo financing a film. The meeting came though Cohen's partner, Stuart Levy, who knew Brian Epstein's parents. However Cohen turned down the group.

The Beatles' London in A Hard Day's Night

The film was shot for United Artists using a cinéma vérité style influenced by the French New Wave and British kitchen sink realism in black-and-white. The film was meant to be released in July 1964, and since it was already March when filming began, the entire film had to be produced over a period of sixteen weeks. The film had a low budget for its time of £200,000 (equivalent to £3.5 million in 2025) and filming was finished in under seven weeks, leaving the rest of the time for post-production. At first, the film itself was a secondary consideration to United Artists, whose primary interest was in being able to release the soundtrack album in the United States before the Beatles' American label Capitol Records could; in the words of Bud Ornstein, the European head of production for United Artists: "Our record division wants to get the soundtrack album to distribute in the States, and what we lose on the film we'll get back on this disc." According to film historian Stephen Glynn, A Hard Day's Night was intended as "a low-budget exploitation film to milk the latest brief musical craze for all it was worth."

Unlike most productions, the film was shot in near sequential order, as stated by Lennon in 1964. Filming began on 2 March 1964 at Marylebone station in London; the four Beatles had joined the British actors' union, Equity, only that morning. The first week of filming took place on a train travelling between London and Minehead, Somerset. On 10 March, scenes with Ringo were shot at the Turk's Head pub in Twickenham, and over the following week various interior scenes were filmed at Twickenham Studios. From 23 to 30 March, filming moved to the Scala Theatre in Fitzrovia, and on 31 March, concert footage was shot there, although the group mimed to backing tracks. On the 17 March and the 17 April scenes were shot at the Les Ambassadeurs Club in Mayfair. The "Can't Buy Me Love" segment, which featured creative camera work such as undercranking and the band running and jumping around in a field, was shot on 23 April 1964 at Thornbury Playing Fields, Isleworth. The final scene was filmed the following day in West Ealing, where Ringo obligingly drops his coat over puddles for a lady to step on, only to discover that the final puddle is actually a large hole.

Picture taken during the filming of the "Can't Buy Me Love" segment

Before A Hard Day's Night was released in America, a United Artists executive asked Lester to dub the Beatles' voices with Mid-Atlantic accents. McCartney angrily replied, "Look, if we can understand a fucking cowboy talking Texan, they can understand us talking Liverpool." Lester subsequently directed the Beatles' 1965 film, Help!.

The film's costumes—except for those of the Beatles themselves—were the work of future Academy Award-winning designer Julie Harris. The clothes of the Beatles were credited to Dougie Millings & Son, the tailor who had created the original Beatles look and appeared as a tailor in the film.

=== Casting ===
Irish actor Wilfrid Brambell, who played Paul McCartney's fictional grandfather, John McCartney, was already well known to British television audiences as a co-star in the sitcom Steptoe and Son. The recurring joke that he was very "clean" reflects a contrast to his sitcom role, where he was always referred to as a "dirty old man". For American audiences, the comment was more of a spoof on the Beatles continually being referred to as "very clean". Norman Rossington played the Beatles' manager Norm, John Junkin played the group's road manager Shake, and Victor Spinetti played the television director.

The supporting cast included Richard Vernon as the "city gent" on the train and Lionel Blair as a featured dancer. There were also various cameos. John Bluthal played a car thief and an uncredited Derek Nimmo appeared as magician Leslie Jackson. David Janson (billed as David Jaxon here) played the small boy met by Ringo on his "walkabout". Rooney Massara, who went on to compete in the 1972 Munich Olympics, was the sculler in the river in the "walkabout" scene by the river at Kew (uncredited). Kenneth Haigh appeared as an advertising executive who mistakes George for a "new phenomenon". David Langton also made a cameo appearance as an actor in the dressing room scene.

Mal Evans, one of the Beatles' road managers, also appears briefly in the film—moving an upright bass through a tight hallway as Lennon talks with the woman who mistakes him for someone else.

George Harrison met his wife-to-be, Pattie Boyd, on the set when she made a brief (uncredited) appearance as one of the schoolgirls on the train. His initial overtures to her were spurned because she had a boyfriend at the time, but he persisted and they were married within 18 months. The girl with Boyd in the dining car scene is Prudence Bury. Phil Collins, later a member of the band Genesis, was an uncredited schoolboy extra in the concert audience.

Playing the buxom woman with Paul's grandfather in the casino scene was popular British 1960s pinup model Margaret Nolan, who also appeared as "Dink", the golden girl during the opening credits of the James Bond film Goldfinger, later that same year.

=== Cut for BBFC ===
The film had to be edited slightly to obtain the U certificate for British cinemas. The phrase "get knotted" (allegedly in reel 7 of the original submission) was judged inappropriate for a U film and had to be removed. When the film was submitted for release on VHS, the British Board of Film Censors (BBFC) could not locate the phrase and presumed that the clip was "pre-cut", but stated that the phrase was no longer of any concern. The BBFC noted a number of innuendos and one subtle reference to cocaine, but concluded that it was still within the "natural category" for a U certificate.

== Reception ==
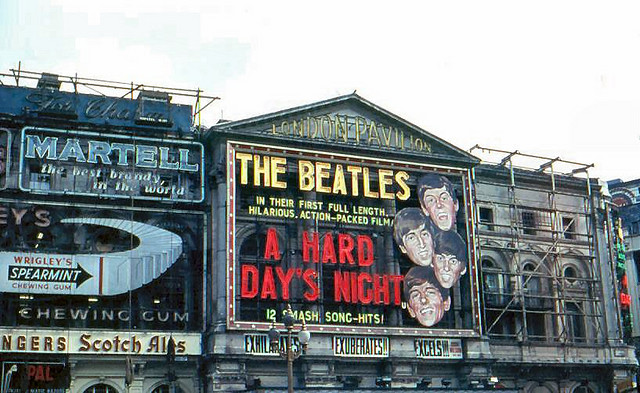
A Hard Day's Night at London Pavilion in August 1964.

The film premiered at the Pavilion Theatre in London on 6 July 1964. The film and its soundtrack were widely released on 10 July. A Hard Day's Night set records at the London Pavilion by grossing over $20,000 in the first week (equivalent to $208,000 in 2025), ultimately becoming so popular that more than 1,600 prints were in circulation simultaneously. The film opened in 500 theatres in the United States and Canada on 12 August. In its initial run it grossed $14 million (equivalent to $145 million in 2025).

=== Critical response ===
Contemporary reviews of the film were mostly positive; one oft-quoted assessment was provided by Andrew Sarris of The Village Voice, who deemed it "the Citizen Kane of jukebox musicals." When The Village Voice published the results of its first annual film poll, A Hard Day's Night placed second among the films of 1964, behind only Dr. Strangelove. On review aggregator Rotten Tomatoes the film holds an approval rating of 98% based on 112 reviews, with an average rating of 8.50/10. The website's critics consensus reads: "A Hard Day's Night, despite its age, is still a delight to watch and has proven itself to be a rock-and-roll movie classic." It is number four on Rotten Tomatoes' list of the Top Ten Musicals and Performing Arts films. On Metacritic, it has a weighted average score of 96 out of 100, based on 24 critics, indicating "universal acclaim".

Time magazine called the film "One of the smoothest, freshest, funniest films ever made for purposes of exploitation." Film critic Roger Ebert described the film as "one of the great life-affirming landmarks of the movies", and added it to his list of The Great Movies. In 2004, Total Film magazine named A Hard Day's Night the 42nd greatest British film of all time. In 2005, Time.com named it one of the 100 best films of the last 80 years. Leslie Halliwell gave the film his highest rating, four stars, the only British film of 1964 to achieve that accolade.

The New York Times film critic Bosley Crowther noted that the film was a subtle satire on Beatlemania and the Beatles themselves, faced with screaming crowds, journalists who ask nonsensical questions, and authority figures who constantly look down upon them and mock youth culture at large. The New Yorker critic Brendan Gill wrote: "Though I don't pretend to understand what makes these four rather odd-looking boys so fascinating to so many scores of millions of people, I admit that I feel a certain mindless joy stealing over me as they caper about uttering sounds."

A Hard Day's Night was nominated for two Academy Awards: for Best Screenplay (Alun Owen), and Best Score (Adaptation) (George Martin). None of the Lennon-McCartney songs were nominated, with the Best Original Song award going to "Chim Chim Cher-ee" from Mary Poppins.

== Influence ==
British critic Leslie Halliwell states the film's influence as "it led directly to all the kaleidoscopic swinging London spy thrillers and comedies of the later sixties". In particular, the visuals and storyline are credited with inspiring the Monkees' television series. The "Can't Buy Me Love" segment borrowed stylistically from Richard Lester's earlier The Running Jumping & Standing Still Film, and it is this segment, in particular using the contemporary technique of cutting the images to the beat of the music, which has been cited as a precursor of modern music videos. Roger Ebert goes even further, crediting Lester for a more pervasive influence, even constructing "a new grammar": "he influenced many other films. Today, when we watch TV and see quick cutting, hand-held cameras, interviews conducted on the run with moving targets, quickly intercut snatches of dialogue, music under documentary action and all the other trademarks of the modern style, we are looking at the children of A Hard Day's Night". Film theorist James Monroe writes, "The lively 1960s films of Richard Lester—especially his Musicals A Hard Day's Night (1964), Help! (1965), and A Funny Thing Happened on the Way to the Forum (1966)—popularised jump cuts, rapid and 'ungrammatical' cutting. Over time, his brash editorial style became a norm, now celebrated every night around the world in hundreds of music videos on MTV and in countless commercials." A Hard Day's Night also inspired a 1965 film featuring Gerry and the Pacemakers, entitled Ferry Cross the Mersey. In an interview for the DVD re-release of A Hard Day's Night, Lester said he had been labelled the father of MTV and had jokingly responded by asking for a paternity test.

== Title ==
The film's title originated from something said by Ringo Starr, who described it this way in an interview with disc jockey Dave Hull in 1964: "We went to do a job, and we'd worked all day, and we happened to work all night. I came up still thinking it was day, I suppose, and I said, 'It's been a hard day ...' and I looked around and saw it was dark, so I said, '... night!' So we came to A Hard Day's Night."

According to Lennon in a 1980 interview with Playboy magazine: "I was going home in the car, and Dick Lester suggested the title, 'Hard Day's Night' from something Ringo had said. I had used it in In His Own Write, but it was an off-the-cuff remark by Ringo. You know, one of those malapropisms. A Ringo-ism, where he said it not to be funny... just said it. So Dick Lester said, 'We are going to use that title.'"

In a 1994 interview for The Beatles Anthology, however, McCartney disagreed with Lennon's recollections, recalling that it was the Beatles, and not Lester, who had come up with the idea of using Starr's verbal misstep: "The title was Ringo's. We'd almost finished making the film, and this fun bit arrived that we'd not known about before, which was naming the film. So we were sitting around at Twickenham studios having a little brain-storming session ... and we said, 'Well, there was something Ringo said the other day.' Ringo would do these little malapropisms, he would say things slightly wrong, like people do, but his were always wonderful, very lyrical ... they were sort of magic even though he was just getting it wrong. And he said after a concert, 'Phew, it's been a hard day's night.'"

Yet another version of events appeared in 1996; producer Walter Shenson said that Lennon had described to him some of Starr's funnier gaffes, including "a hard day's night", whereupon Shenson immediately decided that that was going to be the title of the film.

Regardless of which of these origin stories is the true one, the original tentative title for the film had been "Beatlemania", and when the new title was agreed upon, it became necessary to write and quickly record a new title song, which was completed on 16 April, just eight days before filming was finished. John Lennon wrote the song (credited to Lennon–McCartney) in one night, writing the lyrics on the back of a birthday card sent to his young son Julian, and it went on to win a Grammy for Best Performance by a Vocal Group.

The film was titled Yeah Yeah Yeah in Germany and Sweden, Tutti Per Uno (All for One) in Italy, Quatre garçons dans le vent (Four Boys in the Wind (Note: The expression "dans le vent" means being "in fashion" or "hip".)) in France Yeah! Yeah! Tässä tulemme! (Yeah! Yeah! Here We Come!) in Finland and Os Reis do Iê-Iê-Iê (The Kings of Yeah-yeah-yeah) in Brazil.

== Novelisation ==
In 1964, Pan Books published a novelisation of the film by the author John Burke, described as "based on the original screenplay by Alun Owen". The book was priced at two shillings and sixpence and contained an 8-page section of photographs from the film. It is the first book in the English language to have the word 'grotty' in print.

== Release history ==
- 1964: A Hard Day's Night was released by United Artists.
- 1967: The film premiered on American television on the NBC network on 24 October; the usual Peacock introduction, which preceded all NBC colour broadcasts of the era, was replaced by a humorous black-and-white animated cartoon penguin, with cartoon representations of the Beatles jumping out of its stomach, as A Hard Day's Night was not shot in colour;
- 1970: The film premiered on UK television on BBC1 on 28 December. John Lennon watched the broadcast at home and was inspired to write the song "I'm the Greatest", which was later recorded by Ringo Starr on his 1973 album Ringo.
- 1979: Rights to the film were transferred to its producer, Walter Shenson.
- 1982: Universal Pictures, under licence from Shenson, reissued the film in theatres. This release included a prologue consisting of production stills set to the song "I'll Cry Instead", which would remain on subsequent home video editions until 2000.
- 1984: MPI Home Video, under licence from Shenson, first released A Hard Day's Night on home video in the VHS, Betamax, CED Videodisc, and Laserdisc formats, which all included the prologue.
  - The film was also released by Janus Films as part of The Criterion Collection in both a single-disc CLV and a two-disc CAV Laserdisc format. The additional features section on the CAV edition includes the original theatrical trailer, an interview with Richard Lester, and his The Running Jumping & Standing Still Film.
  - There were notable pitch problems with the songs in this version, precisely one semitone lower than the original recordings. This was fixed in subsequent releases.
- 1993: Voyager Company produced a CD-ROM for Mac and PC platforms with video in QuickTime 1 format, containing most of Criterion's elements, including the original script.
- 1997: MPI Home Video released the first DVD edition. It contains the 1982 prologue and trailer, newsreels, an interview with Richard Lester, and The Running Jumping & Standing Still Film.
- 2000: Miramax Films reissued the film in theatres in the United States and then as a collector's edition DVD two years later, as well as its final issue in the VHS format. The film had been transferred from the restored 35 mm negative and presented in 1.66:1 Widescreen. The prologue that Universal added in 1982 is absent on the Miramax releases.
  - In addition to the original film, the DVD edition contained a bonus disc with over 7 hours of additional material, including interviews with cast and crew members and Beatles associates. The DVD was produced by Beatles historian and producer Martin Lewis, a longtime friend of Walter Shenson.
- 2009: The film was released on Blu-ray Disc in Canada; however, the disc is region-free and will play in any Blu-ray machine. It contains most of the 2000 DVD bonus features.
- 2010: Miramax was sold by Disney to Filmyard Holdings, LLC, and the home video sub-licence transferred to Lionsgate, although no US Blu-ray release date had been announced.
- 2011: A new Blu-ray edition was released in Mexico; this version has Spanish subtitles.
- 2014: Janus Films acquired the rights to the film from Miramax (on behalf of the Shenson Estate, managed by Bruce Karsh) and announced a domestic video re-release via The Criterion Collection on 24 June 2014. This dual-format edition (which incorporates the first-ever US issue on Blu-ray) contains various supplements from all previous video re-issues. This marked the return of this film to Criterion for the first time in two decades. The film was also released in theatres across the US and in the UK (by Metrodome in the latter region) on 4 July 2014. On 6 July 2014, the film was shown in re-mastered HD on BBC Four in the UK to mark its 50th anniversary. Criterion's DVD/Blu-ray release of A Hard Day's Night was duplicated by Umbrella Entertainment in Australia (released 2 July) and Second Sight Films in the UK (released 21 July).
- 2015: On 15 December, Criterion re-released its Blu-ray as part of The Rock Box, a collection of rock music-related films that also includes Monterey Pop (1968), Gimme Shelter (1970) and Quadrophenia (1979).
- 2022: On 11 August 2021, Criterion announced that its first 4K Ultra HD releases, a six-film slate, would include A Hard Day's Night. Criterion indicated that each title would be available in a 4K UHD+Blu-ray combo pack, including a 4K UHD disc of the feature film as well as the film and special features on the companion Blu-ray. A Hard Day's Night was released on 18 January 2022.

=== 40th anniversary cast-and-crew-reunion screening ===
On 6 July 2004, the 40th anniversary of the film's world premiere, a private cast-and-crew-reunion screening was hosted in London by DVD producer Martin Lewis. The screening was attended by McCartney, actors Victor Spinetti, John Junkin and David Janson and many crew members. In media interviews at the event, McCartney disclosed that while he had seen the film many times on video, he had not seen the film on the "big screen" since its 1964 premiere.

== See also ==
- 1964 in film
- Spice World, a 1997 film featuring the Spice Girls with a similar premise and similar gags

== Sources ==
- Miles, Barry (2001). The Beatles Diary Volume 1: The Beatles Years. London: Omnibus Press. ISBN 978-0-7119-8308-3.
