= Jimmy Rutherford (International Brigades) =

International Brigades volunteer, executed aged 20

- Born: James Rutherford; 20 November 1917; Newhaven, Edinburgh, Scotland
- Died: 24 May 1938 (aged 20); San Pedro de Cardona concentration camp, Spain
- Cause of death: Execution by firing squad
- Organization: International Brigades

James Rutherford (20 November 1917 – 24 May 1938) was a Scottish communist and volunteer with the International Brigades, who was captured and expelled from Spain in 1937, but returned to fight against fascism, and was executed in the Spanish Civil War.

== Background ==
Rutherford was born on 20 November 1917 and brought up in the close-knit fishing village of Newhaven on Forth, at 9 Ann Street (near Leith, Edinburgh) where he lived with his grandmother, a Newhaven fishwife who had carried a heavy creel on her back to sell the catch. His father and other family members were active among the 400 year old Society of the Free Fishermen of Newhaven. He worked for Free Fisherman convenor, David Dryburgh, a trawlerman, and Labour party parliamentary candidate, who said of Rutherford that as well as being cheerful, he was 'a keen student of social and economic conditions'. At 19 years old, he left to join the Spanish Civil War, having joined the communist party in 1935.

== Volunteering for the International Brigades ==
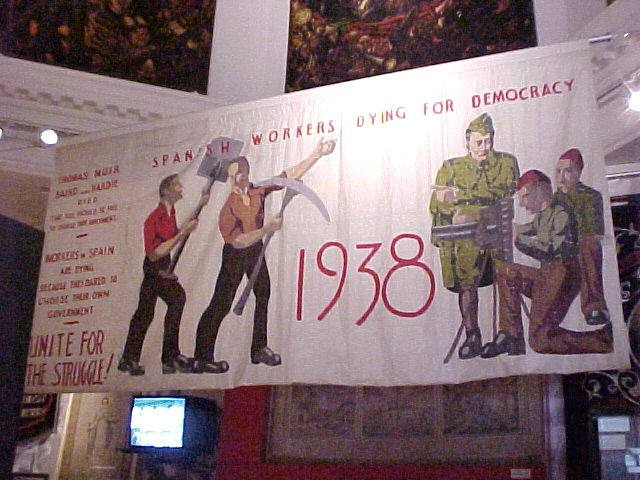
Banner calling Scottish workers to support the Spanish Civil War

Rutherford first volunteered to travel to fight for the Spanish Republican cause in December 1936, crossing via Dover to Dunkirk, with a group of 65 volunteers, including Peter Kerrigan. This group of the International Brigades reached Spain on 22 December 1936, and Rutherford was allocated to join fellow Scot, Harold Fry, a former shoe repairer, who had served as a sergeant in World War One, and led the machine gun company. The two became friends despite their age difference. They were captured at Jarama, two months later (2 February 1937) and Rutherford and Fry were initially sentenced to death, but later deported as part of a prisoner exchange from Spain, on 25 May 1937, on promising not to return.

But Rutherford was back again within six weeks, after trying to raise more support for the cause at home, and joined with 500 Scottish volunteers who to continue the working class struggle against fascism, in 1937-38, having told his father If all the young men had seen what I saw out there, they would be doing as I am doing.

He met George Drever from nearby Leith at the Labour League of Youth. Fellow communist, Drever was also older than Rutherford when he decided to be among the 'best to go' to fight , but was pragmatically aware that the uprising was unlikely to succeed, even beforehand. Rutherford, was said to be more of an idealist.

Entering Spain on foot, travelling in secret through the Pyrenees to Figueras, they met with Republican soldiers and locals who were suffering from hunger. The group went on by rail to Tarazona for basic training, although Rutherford was sent for officer training and was made a lieutenant. The Scottish volunteers marched through towns like Belchite, and saw how much had been destroyed already. Rutherford was again to be led by his friend Harry Fry, who had also returned and been promoted to Commander but was killed at Ebro. Rutherford and the others suffered a tank attack, got lost for three days, and too close to fascist troops, were captured by the Italians, at Calaceite on 31 March 1938, with John Goldstein from their battalion, also a Spanish speaker.

== Prisoner of war and execution ==
As Republican prisoners, under sentence of death from before, Rutherford and others knew they could be executed at once, but were taken to a prison camp at Valladolid, by rail with only tinned fish, bread and figs to eat, and at stopping points, women gave them water. Valladolid camp had a mixture of Spanish and international prisoners like Germans and Poles, suffering hunger and poor hygiene, resulting in getting infested with lice. Then they were moved to Burgos, the San Pedro de Cardena concentration camp, where the German Gestapo were involved and they were deporting Jews and non Europeans. Because Rutherford had fought in Spain, and had promised not to return, he used a false name (James Smalls) but Merry de Val, a fascist officer who was associated with the Spanish Embassy in London, recognised and accused him and his fingerprints confirmed his identity.

At the age of 20, as he had expected and risked when he rejoined the Brigades, he was chosen to be executed. Jimmy Rutherford was killed by firing squad on 24 May 1938.

Drever wrote in code to inform their Communist Party comrades in Edinburgh of his loss, and was said to feel some sort of 'survivor guilt', returning home (although his family initially had been told he died too) but he had eventually left Spain before the fighting ended and knew that more fellow volunteers were killed too,

Jimmy Rutherford's loss was mourned by his fisher community in Newhaven, and the communist and socialist movement. In the Daily Worker, he was described as One of Scotland's National Heroes, who gave his life for an ideal, and it also said that 'he deserves to remain in Scotland's memory for ever'. Drever and other survivors in their group were interviewed in the 1980s in a collection of personal stories from the Scottish International Brigade, their photographs were hung in the National Galleries of Scotland, and a memorial to the International Brigades Lothians and Fife volunteers was placed in Princes Street Gardens, Edinburgh, but to date (2021) there is no specific physical memorial to Jimmy Rutherford. The wording on the International Brigades plaque says

Not to a fanfare of trumpets,

Nor even the skirl o' the pipes,

Not for the offer of a shilling,

Nor to see their name up in lights.

Their call was a cry of anguish,

From the hearts of the people of Spain,

Some paid with their lives it is true

Their sacrifice was not in vain

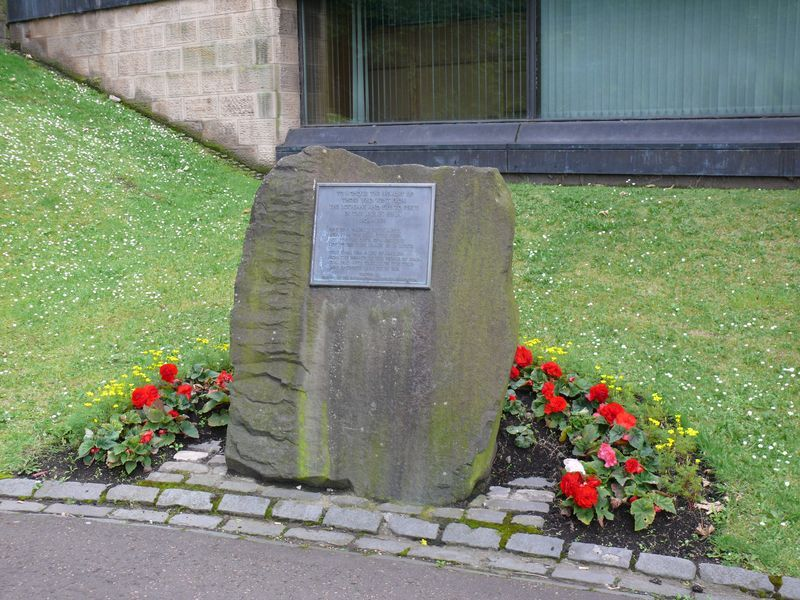
Memorial to the International Brigades, Princes Street Gardens, Edinburgh

A heavy cotton banner with Rutherford's portrait and name Jimmy Rutherford Leith, the sickle red flag and tricoloured flag with the words 'Died for Our Liberty" written above him, is in the Historical Environment Scotland's SCRAN collection.

== External resources ==
- Historic Environment Scotland, Jimmy Rutherford Banner, Scran ID: 000-000-033-443-C: SCRAN
