= Thomas Diery Patten =

Scottish mechanical engineer and educator

Thomas Diery Patten CBE FRSE (1 January 1926 – 4 July 1999) was a Scottish mechanical engineer and educator. He was involved in the development of the Scottish North Sea Oil Industry in the 1960s, heading the Institute of Offshore Engineering. He was President of the Institute of Mechanical Engineers 1991/92. He was known as Tom Patten.

== Life ==
He was born in Ford, Northumberland on New Years Day, 1 January 1926 to Scottish parents: his father was William Ford who had raised himself from a post office telegraph boy to manager of the Prudential Insurance Company.

His family moved to Edinburgh and he was educated at Leith Academy. He then studied engineering at the University of Edinburgh graduating with a BSc. Although too young to serve in the Second World War he served National Service 1947 to 1949, and was posted first to Palestine (during its critical years), and then to the British Military Mission in Greece where he attached to the Royal Electrical and Mechanical Engineers with the notional rank of captain. In 1950 he returned to Edinburgh and began lecturing in engineering at the University of Edinburgh. He became senior lecturer in 1952 and gained his first doctorate in 1954. He ran the University's Officer Training Corps. In 1957 he had a sabbatical year at McGill University in Canada. In 1967 he was given a professorship at Heriot-Watt University. He later became Vice Principal of the University.

In 1961 he was elected a Fellow of the Royal Society of Edinburgh. His proposers were John F. Allen, William Ewart Farvis, Norman Feather and Mowbray Ritchie. He served as Secretary to the Society from 1972 to 1976 and as Vice President 1976 to 1979. Queen Elizabeth II appointed him a Commander of the Order of the British Empire (CBE) in the 1981 Birthday Honours.

He retired in 1981 and died on 4 April 1999.

== Family ==
In 1950 he married Jacqueline Wright. They had two daughters, Diane and Gail and one son, Colin Patten.
