= Newhaven Heritage Museum =

Former museum in Newhaven, Edinburgh, Scotland

The Newhaven Heritage Museum was a museum located in the village of Newhaven, within the City of Edinburgh, Scotland.

The museum opened in 1993 and was established in the former fish market, close to the harbour. It detailed the history of the village, from its inception as a naval shipyard in the early 16th Century. The museum closed in September 2006 for work on the building but there are no plans for its reopening.
