= Blacklisting =

Practice of prohibiting people or entities

Blacklisting is the action of a group or authority compiling a blacklist of people, countries or other entities to be avoided or distrusted as being deemed unacceptable to those making the list; if people are on a blacklist, then they are considered to have done something wrong, or they are considered to be untrustworthy. As a verb, blacklist can mean to put an individual or entity on such a list. A blacklist is synonymous with a list of banned persons or organizations, and is the opposite of a whitelist.

== Origins of the term ==
The English dramatist Philip Massinger used the phrase "black list" in his 1639 tragedy The Unnatural Combat.

After the restoration of the English monarchy brought Charles II of England to the throne in 1660, a list of regicides named those to be punished for the execution of his father. The state papers of Charles II say "If any innocent soul be found in this black list, let him not be offended at me, but consider whether some mistaken principle or interest may not have misled him to vote". In a 1676 history of the events leading up to the Restoration, James Heath (a supporter of Charles II) alleged that Parliament had passed an Act requiring the sale of estates, "And into this black list the Earl of Derby was now put, and other unfortunate Royalists".

Edward Gibbon wrote in The History of the Decline and Fall of the Roman Empire (1776) of Andronicus that "His memory was stored with a black list of the enemies and rivals, who had traduced his merit, opposed his greatness, or insulted his misfortunes".

== History ==
=== Employment ===
The first published reference to blacklisting of an employee dates from 1774. This became a significant employment issue in American mining towns and company towns, where blacklisting could mean a complete loss of livelihood for workers who went on strike. The 1901 Report of the Industrial Commission stated "There was no doubt in the minds of workingmen of the existence of the blacklisting system, though it was practically impossible to obtain evidence of it." It cited a news report that in 1895 a former conductor on the Atlantic and Pacific Railroad committed suicide, having been out of work ever since a strike: "Wherever he went, the blacklist was ahead of him".

Though the USA National Labor Relations Act of 1935 outlawed punitive blacklists against employees who supported trade unions or criticised their employers, the practice continued in common use in the USA. The Taft-Hartley Act of 1947 made amendments which sustained blacklisting by affirming the right of employers to be anti-union, and by requiring trade union leaders to make loyalty oaths which had the same effect as the Hollywood blacklist. Since then, lawsuits for unfair dismissal have led to blacklisting being covert or informal, but it remains common.

In 1981, following the PATCO workers' refusal to return to work, the Reagan administration fired the 11,345 striking air traffic controllers who had ignored the order, and banned them from federal service for life.

==== Hollywood blacklist ====
The Hollywood blacklist was an entertainment industry blacklist instituted in 1947 to block screenwriters and other Hollywood professionals who were purported to have Communist sympathies from obtaining employment. It started by listing 151 entertainment industry professionals and lasted until 1960 when it was effectively broken by the acknowledgement that blacklisted professionals had been working under assumed names for many years.

=== Spanish Civil War and communists blacklisted ===
At least one Scottish volunteer (George Drever) in the International Brigades who went to Spain to fight Franco's fascists and who was also well known in the British Communist Party in the 1930s was informed by the police Special Branch that his failure to progress in military or career was due to his volunteering in this cause and his beliefs.

=== World Wars I and II ===
During World War I, the British government adopted a "blacklist" based on an Order in Council of 23 December 1915, prohibiting British subjects from trade with specified firms and individuals in neutral countries; the lists were published in the London Gazette.

In the summer of 1940, the SS printed a secret list called Sonderfahndungsliste G.B. ("Special Search List Great Britain") as part of Nazi Germany's preparations for invasion code-named Operation Sea Lion. When this booklet was found after the war, it was commonly called the Black Book and described as a blacklist.

=== Medical context ===
In 1907, the Transvaal Medical Union in South Africa blacklisted patients if they could not pay cash in advance. There was a physical list kept by the community of physicians.

=== 2004 Venezuelan recall referendum ===
After the 2004 Venezuelan recall referendum, ruling party deputy Luis Tascón published on his website a database of more than 2,400,000 Venezuelans who had signed the petition to recall President Hugo Chávez, together with their national identity card numbers (cédula). The list "made sectarianism official", and Venezuelans who signed against Chávez were denied jobs, benefits, and documents, and often subjected to harassment. Once the list was posted, Chávez, on a Venezolana de Televisión broadcast, encouraged use of the website to "verify illicit use of national identity cards". Roger Capella, Minister of Health declared that "those who signed against President Chávez would be fired because they are committing an act of terrorism". There was a public outcry, in particular by the organization Súmate, and because of reports that people who worked for the government were fired, denied work, or denied issuance of official documents because of their appearance on the list. In July 2004, access to the database under management of Comando Maisanta was granted to members of the "Batallones Bolivarianos de Internet (BBI)" (Internet Bolivarian Battalions), which previously had to register on Tascón's website to gain access under the strict requisite that they had not signed the petition for the referendum.

== Computing ==
In computing, a blacklist is an access control system that denies entry to a specific list (or a defined range) of users, programs, or network addresses.

== Terminology concerns ==
In 2018, a medical journal commentary regarding predatory publishing was published, arguing that whitelist, blacklist, among other terms, reinforce existing racial biases and should be avoided in medical literature. The commentary gained public attention in Summer 2020 following the George Floyd protests in the United States wherein a black man died in the custody of Minneapolis police officers, sparking protests against police brutality.

The commentary cites examples of the use of black as a shorthand for disreputable sources and other negative judgements, and white for trustworthiness and safety. The article also notes the origins of blacklist as a label for censure and punishment of workers involved in labor unions, and that early use of the term coincides with the rise of slavery in the Americas, but does not claim its etymology as referring directly to skin color. However, the authors criticize the continued use of blacklist and similar language as inappropriate and harmful due to the ubiquity of white and black as descriptors of racial groups in common parlance, arguing that this association results in use of this type of language perpetuates racism, regardless of its linguistic origin.

Conflict around this issue often emerges in computing industries where whitelist and blacklist are prevalent (e.g. "IP whitelisting"). Some companies, open-source communities, and software developers have chosen to deprecate use of whitelist and blacklist in favor of names which describe the purpose of those lists less ambiguously and are unlikely to come across to a reader as insensitive such as allow list and deny list. An IETF draft technical proposal has been underway since 2018 presenting arguments for avoiding potentially exclusionary language in technical documentation and a standardized set of recommendations for their replacement. Before garnering wider public attention in 2020, similarly motivated changes have also been enacted in years prior to replace terminology such as master/slave with alternatives due to concerns over their potential role in workplace discrimination.

Some critics of these terminology changes question the interpretation of the deprecated language as racial in nature due to the linguistic root of blacklist as being most likely derived from the term black book, which originated in the 1400s as a reference to "a list of people who had committed crimes or fallen out of favor with leaders," popularized by King Henry VIII's literal use of a black book. Others note the prevalence of positive and negative connotations to white and black in some Bible translations into English, taking the position that this historical usage invalidates the claim of racial connotations in modern usage because it predates the emergence of "Black" as a widespread word to refer to one's race as a person of color in America during the 1960s Black power movement.

== See also ==
- Affair of the Cards
- Black Book (gaming) – List of people barred from entering United States casinos
- Blackballing – Rejection via secret ballot
- Blacklisting (Soviet policy) – Soviet Union monetary penalty
- Book censorship – Book removed or banned from public and/or private usage
- Brandmauer – Political strategy in Germany
- Cancel culture – Modern form of social rejection
- Closure (sociology) – Social phenomena
- Debarment – Legal state of being excluded from certain rights or privileges
- Deplatforming – Denying access to a platform to express opinions
- Involuntary unemployment – Condition in which a person is unemployed despite being willing to work
- List of books banned by governments
- Media transparency – Aspect of journalism and communications
- Opt-out – Option avoid receiving unsolicited product or service information
- Ostracon – Broken piece of pottery with inscription
- Persona non grata – Unwelcome foreign person in a country
- Redlining – Systemic denial of services to some areas
- Social exclusion – Form of social disadvantage and relegation to the fringe of society
- Social rejection – Exclusion of someone from social relations
- Social undermining – Type of anti-social behavior
- Whitelisting – Practice of allowing people or entities, generally
