= Isla Dewar =

Scottish novelist (1946–2021)

- Born: Isla White; 29 June 1946
- Died: 20 June 2021 (aged 74)
- Education: Leith Academy
- Known for: Novelist and screenwriter

Isla Dewar (29 June 1946 – 20 June 2021) was a Scottish novelist and screenwriter, known for her novel Women Talking Dirty, turned into a film starring Helena Bonham Carter and Gina McKee. She wrote seventeen novels.

== Biography ==
Isla Dewar was born in Edinburgh to Ian White, a tax inspector, and Marjory (née Roberts). She attended Leith Academy and then worked in the lab of an Edinburgh yogurt factory, rather than attending university. She started her writing career working for teenage magazines including Jackie and Romeo. She married cartoonist Bob Dewar in 1966, and had two sons. She died, aged 74, of a heart attack at her home in Fife.

== Literary career ==
She was a compulsive writer and her first writing job was writing about girls trying to find boyfriends for Romeo romance weekly in Dundee. She wrote about subjects that were thought to interest girls and she did some writing as an agony aunt. She also wrote for My Weekly which was also based in Dundee.

Dewar's first book, Keeping Up with Magda, was published in 1995. Her second book, Women Talking Dirty, published a year later, attracted the interest of Elton John and David Furnish, who purchased the rights for Rocket Pictures. Furnish became the producer and Dewar was engaged to write the screenplay. She moved to John and Furnish's mansion in Windsor where she worked on the screenplay. She used a book by Butch Cassidy and the Sundance Kid's screenwriter William Goldman, Adventures in the Screen Trade, to explain the details of scriptwriting. Dewar assisted the stars of the film with honing their Scottish accents. The film, starring Helena Bonham Carter, James Nesbitt and Gina McKee, was screened at the 1999 Toronto Film Festival. The story concerned the friendship and betrayals of two women living in 1970s Edinburgh.

Dewar became an established Scottish novelist and writer. In 2004 a collection of short stories, Scottish Girls About Town: And Sixteen Other Scottish Women Authors was published. Dewar, Jenny Colgan and Muriel Gray feature on the cover and Dewar's "In the Garden of Mr Pink" was the first story. At the height of her career, Dewar published a book a year, and her work was translated into 17 languages. Her books are known for their humour. To quote from Women Talking Dirty: "You must master the vices. You know that if a thing is worth doing it's worth doing well. If, however, a thing is not worth doing then it's worth doing fabulously, amazingly, with grace, style and panache."

Her seventeenth and final novel A Day Like Any Other was, like her second novel, concerned with the friendship of two women. In this case they had stories that they were not proud of. She was inspired to write the story after seeing two smartly dressed women outside a supermarket laughing with each other. She said that she was able to write it because she was older. She said about life, "It ain’t over until it’s over. You can still have fun. You can still laugh and you can still do stupid things. None of it ends."
