= Douglas Allan =

British geologist and curator

- Born: 28 January 1896; Edinburgh, Scotland
- Died: 30 July 1967 (aged 71)
- Education: George Watson's College, Boroughmuir Student Centre, University of Edinburgh
- Awards: CBE, FRGS, FRSE, FMA
- Scientific career
- Fields: Geology
- Workplaces: Royal Scottish Museum, Ministry of Munitions

Douglas Alexander Allan, CBE, FRSGS, FRSE, FMA (28 January 1896 – 30 July 1967) was a geologist and curator, eventually becoming the director of the Royal Scottish Museum in Edinburgh, from 1945 until 1961.

== Early life and education ==
Born in Edinburgh in 1896 and the son of James Allan and Agnes Annie Logan, Douglas Allan was educated at George Watson's College and Boroughmuir Student Centre before going on to serve throughout World War I at the Department of Explosives Supply, Ministry of Munitions and the Royal Field Artillery. He graduated from the University of Edinburgh with BScs in Geology and Chemistry in 1921 and furthered his education with a PhD from the same University in 1923 and a DSc in 1927. Allan took part in the William Speirs Bruce expeditions to Spitsbergen from 1919 to 1921 and worked as an assistant in the Department of Geology under T. J. Jehu from 1921 to 1925.

== Career ==
He started working as a lecturer at Armstrong College, University of Durham from 1925 to 1929 and was elected as a fellow of the Royal Society of Edinburgh in 1927, having been proposed by Thomas James Jehu, Robert Campbell, John Horne, George Walter Tyrrell, going on to serve as a councillor from 1955 to 1958. In 1929, Allan became the Director of Liverpool Public Museums and stayed in this job until 1945, when he became the Director of the Royal Scottish Museum until his retirement in 1961.

Douglas Allan took an active role in his field and was chairman of the Museums Association and a member of the Post-War Reconstruction Committee on Museums and Art Galleries. He was the Vice-President of the Royal Scottish Geographical Society from 1948 until his death in 1967, serving as President from 1954 to 1958. The Royal Society of Edinburgh awarded him their Neill Prize in 1941 for his papers on "The Geology of the Highland Border."

== Works ==
- Allan, Douglas Alexander (1926). "The volcanic history of Southern Fife". Excerpt from the Proceedings of the Society. VII (2).
- Allan, Douglas A. (1937). The City of Liverpool Public Museums. Liverpool Museum.
- Allan, Douglas Alexander (1946). Shipping museums.
- Allan, Douglas Alexander (1949). The Geology and Scenery of Scotland: Swiney Lectures December 1948-January 1949.
- Allan, Douglas Alexander; UNESCO (1954). International Seminar on the role of Museums in Education, 14 September - 12 October 1952: Brooklyn, New York, U.S.A. UNESCO.
- Allan, Douglas Alexander (1955). James Watt: a memory and a motive for technological museums ... Presidential address to the Watt Club. R. Clark.
- Allan, Douglas Alexander (1957). Folk museums at home and abroad.
- Allan, Douglas Alexander (1960). "John George Bartholomew". Scottish Geographical Magazine. 76 (2): 85–88. doi:10.1080/00369226008735789.
