= Douglas Millings =

British fashion designer

Arnold "Dougie" Millings (30 July 1913, in Manchester – 20 September 2001, in London) was a London-based tailor known as "the Beatles' tailor".

== Early life ==
Millings was born in Manchester, but attended school in Edinburgh at the Leith Academy, going on to apprentice as a tailor at the Edinburgh department store Jenners. He moved on to Leeds for further training before traveling to London in the 1930s and getting a job as a cutter at the Regent Street tailor Hector Powe.

Millings worked as a dispatch rider during World War Two, but suffered an accident in 1944 and was discharged as an invalid. He became head of the tailoring department at Austins on Shaftesbury Avenue during the 1950s, where he met Tito Burns, who introduced him to Cliff Richard. Before long Millings had a long list of celebrity clients, and set up his own shop in 1958.

== Celebrity tailoring ==
Millings' shop was located on 63 Old Compton Street in Soho and began designing for British pop stars such as Cliff Richard, Tommy Steele, and Adam Faith in the early 1960s and made the collarless suits the Beatles wore at the height of Beatlemania in 1963 (inspired by Pierre Cardin) as well as their stage suits for the movie Help!. Millings made more than 500 outfits for the band.

Millings had a small part as a frustrated tailor in the movie A Hard Day's Night.
