= Peter Comrie =

Scottish mathematician and educator

Peter Comrie FRSE LLD EIS (1868 – 1944) was a Scottish mathematician and educator. He served as Rector of Leith Academy 1922 to 1933 and President of the Edinburgh Mathematical Society 1916–17.

== Life ==
He was born on 17 July 1868 in Muthill the son of Peter Comrie, master blacksmith and Elizabeth Ritchie. He was educated at Muthill School and then Morrison's Academy in Crieff. He then won a place at St Andrews University studying Mathematics, graduating BSc, MA. From 1895 he began working as a mathematics teacher, firstly in Greenock Academy, then Hutcheson's Grammar School, and Robert Gordon's College. In 1904 he moved to Edinburgh and remained there for the rest of his life, but teaching in various schools. Firstly in Boroughmuir High School then in 1917 received his first role as headmaster: at Castlehill School at the head of the Royal Mile. In 1922 he moved to be headmaster of Leith Academy where he remained until retiral in 1933.

He was elected a Fellow of the Royal Society of Edinburgh in 1909 his main proposer being Sir James Donaldson. St Andrews University awarded him an honorary doctorate (LLD) in 1928.

He died at home 19 Craighouse Terrace in Edinburgh on 20 December 1944.

== Memberships ==
- President of the Edinburgh Mathematical Society (1916 and 1917)
- President of the Educational Institute of Scotland (1928)
- Co-opted member of the Education Committee for Edinburgh Corporation (1933–44)
- Governor of George Heriot's Trust
- Member of the Edinburgh Provincial Committee
- Member of the Central Executive Committee for Training of Teachers (in Scotland)

== Publications ==
- Chambers New Commercial Arithmetic (1911)

== Family ==
Comrie was married to Charlotte Aikman from St Andrews.
