= Women Talking Dirty =

2001 film

- DVD cover
- Directed by: Coky Giedroyc
- Written by: Isla Dewar
- Based on: Women Talking Dirty by Isla Dewar
- Produced by: David Furnish; Jean Doumanian
- Starring: Helena Bonham Carter; Gina McKee
- Music by: Simon Boswell
- Production companies: Jean Doumanian Productions; Petunia Productions; Rocket Pictures
- Distributed by: Universal Pictures (through United International Pictures)
- Release date: 7 December 2001 (UK)
- Running time: 97 minutes
- Country: United Kingdom
- Language: English
- Budget: $5 million

Women Talking Dirty is a 1999 British comedy film directed by Coky Giedroyc and starring Helena Bonham Carter, Gina McKee and James Nesbitt. It is an adaptation of the novel Women Talking Dirty written by Isla Dewar, who also wrote the screenplay.

The story centers on Cora and Ellen, two women who strike an unlikely friendship over their love of drinking and amidst the rakish men in their lives.

== Plot ==
Cora and Ellen are two women living in Edinburgh. Ellen, the more straight-laced of the pair, is a budding cartoonist with prospects to run her own business alongside her colleague Stanley. Quirky Cora is a single mother-to-be who dropped out of university.

The pair first meet when Ellen goes to a pub after a falling out with her womanizing, gambling-addicted husband Daniel, who has revealed to Ellen he does not want children. There she meets a heavily pregnant Cora. Despite the women's obvious differences, they immediately become friends and Ellen becomes Cora's coach as she goes into hospital to give birth to her son Sam.

A year and a half later, Cora has a run-in with Daniel, who seduces her under a fake name. After their one-night stand, Cora is horrified when Daniel turns up at the café where she works and kisses Ellen in front of her. Even more horrifying is the realization she has become pregnant once again, this time with her best-friend's husband. Although Cora decides to keep the child, Daniel decides he wants nothing to do with her and refuses to support her financially, leaving Cora once again a single mother with no additional income.

Years pass, and Ellen and Daniel go through a rather messy divorce which is left slightly easier by the fact that he has taken off to Barbados. Regardless of the hurt he has caused her, Ellen is still in love with him, fully unaware that Daniel has fathered her best friend's youngest son Col. Cora, on the other hand, is still struggling with life, and is depressed and guilty over her secret betrayal. She has never been able to reveal the truth of her son's paternity to Ellen.

When Daniel returns, Cora, feeling she is running out of time to tell Ellen the truth, and urged by friends and neighbours who know her secret, decides to come clean to Ellen at a dinner party at her loft. Ellen is humiliated at Cora's disclosure and throws all the guests out, locking herself in her flat for days with depression over the fact Cora had the child with Daniel that Ellen had always wanted. Daniel returns to Ellen following the dinner party but she rejects him. In the meantime, Cora develops a relationship with Ellen's co-worker, Stanley, and, after a near-death experience, begins to feel more confident within herself and about what she wants from life. Finally she works up the courage to go to Ellen and apologise.

Regardless of their row, the friends manage to come to a mutual understanding just as Daniel bursts into the flat with a friend to remove a purple velvet Victorian-style couch he had given Ellen as a wedding gift. An argument between the women and Daniel ensues, resulting in Ellen forfeiting the couch and throwing both of the men out. Immediately afterwards, Ellen retrieves a bag from a cupboard that contains £25,000 that Daniel had won from gambling and stashed away. Ellen splits the money, giving £13,000 of it to Cora to make up for the funds Daniel had never given for Col, and takes the remaining money to the bookmakers where she bets the lot on a no-chance horse. Seconds after leaving the bookmakers, Daniel confronts her, having realised his mistake and demanding his money back. Ellen hands him the betting slip and walks away with Cora, having finally gotten her revenge on him.

== Cast ==
- Helena Bonham Carter as Cora
- Gina McKee as Ellen
- James Nesbitt as Stanley
- James Purefoy as Daniel
- Eileen Atkins as Emily
- Richard Wilson as Ronald
- Kenneth Cranham as George
- Freddie Highmore as Sam
- Bertie Highmore as Col

== Production ==
The original story was Isla Dewar's second book written when she was living in Scotland with her husband, Bob. The film rights were bought by Rocket Pictures after Elton John and David Furnish liked the story. The Dewar family moved to a mansion in Windsor where Dewar wrote the screenplay. Dewar used a book by Butch Cassidy and the Sundance Kid's screenwriter William Goldman, "Adventures in the Screen Trade", to explain the details of scriptwriting.

== Reception ==
=== Release ===
The film was screened at the Toronto International Film Festival on 17 September 1999 and was re-edited after a poor reception. It released theatrically in the UK on 7 December 2001.

=== Critical reception ===
Women Talking Dirty received positive to mixed reviews from critics. Jamie Russell of BBC gave the film 3 out of 5 stars and added "Women Talking Dirty is an above average relationship drama. It benefits enormously from the chemistry between its two female leads and an excellent supporting cast...". Philip French of The Guardian wrote, "The plotting is as chaotic as the film's handling of Edinburgh's geography, but the performances keep it afloat". William Thomas from Empire gave the film 3 out of 5 stars and stated it is "one of those films which will keep perfectly well until the video release, but if you've seen everything else, you could do a lot worse than give this one a go".

A critical review from Variety stated the film is "Desperately peppy, disappointingly free of dirty talk and overall about as believable as thesp Helena Bonham Carter's Scottish accent" with a script that has "no clear idea of what it wants to be". Angus Wolfe Murray of Eye for Film wrote Carter does not "make Cora's feisty personality believable. Anna Friel did a far better job in Me Without You. McKee is calm, serene and lovely. It's an easier role - the victim - but she fits it beautifully."
