= Leith Academy =

Coordinates: 55°58′1.90″N 3°9′59.64″W

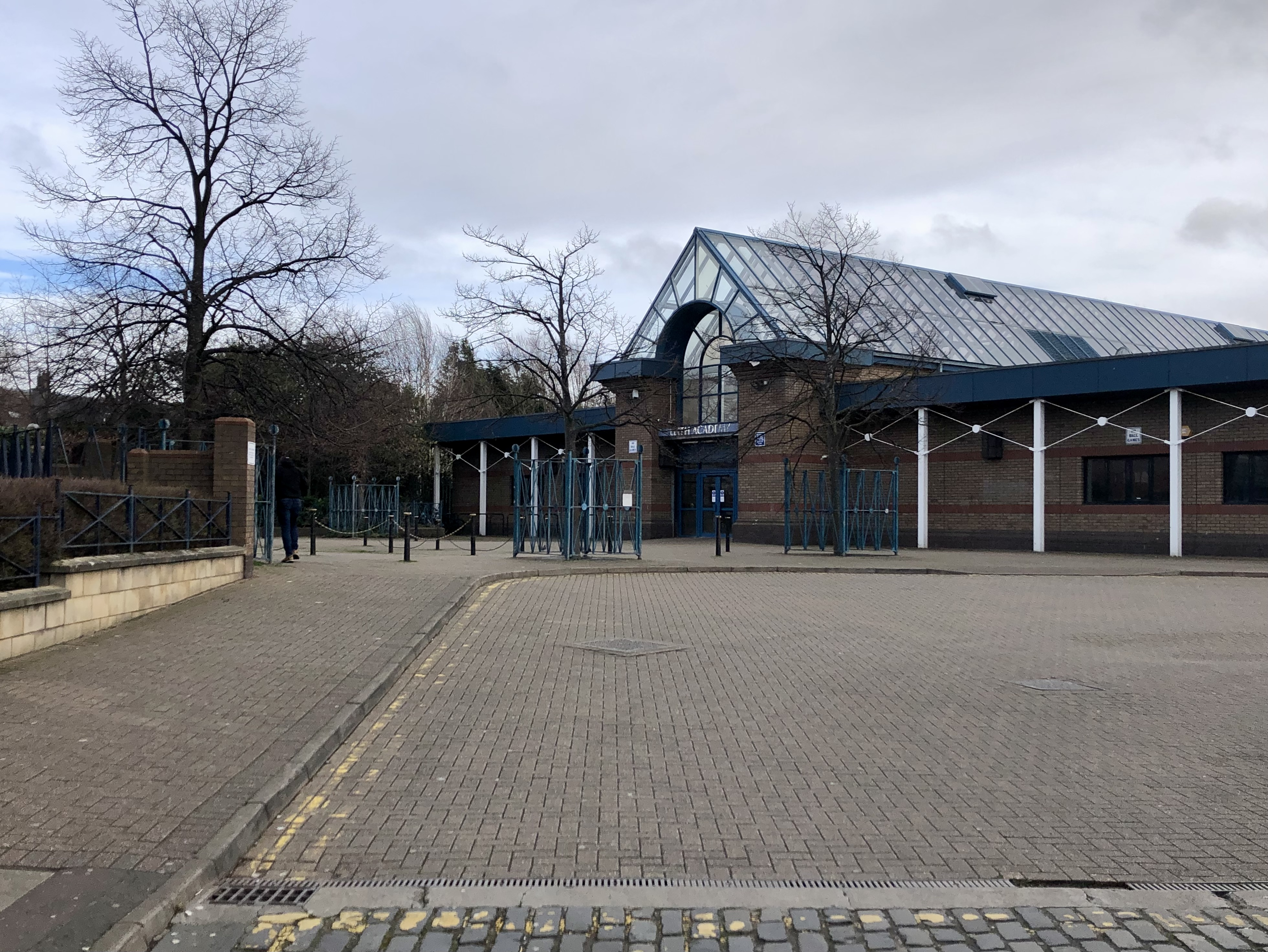

Location
- 20 Academy Park; Edinburgh, EH6 8JQ; Scotland

Information
- Type: State school
- Motto: Persevere
- Religious affiliation: Non-denominational
- Established: 1560; 466 years ago
- Local authority: Edinburgh City
- Department for Education URN: 5533236 Tables
- Head Teacher: Mike Irving (2017–present)
- Staff: 120 (2017)
- Gender: Mixed
- Age: 12 to 18
- Enrolment: 1000 (2021/22)
- Houses: Barton; Cowan; Port; Anderson
- Colours: Blue
- Website: https://leithacademy.uk/

Leith Academy is a state school in Leith, Edinburgh. It currently educates around 1000 pupils and around 2,800 part-time adult learners. Mike Irving has been head teacher since August 2017.

== History ==
It is one of the oldest schools in Scotland, with its founding usually credited to 1560, though there are records of a Leith grammar school as early as 1521 ("maister of the gramer scule of Leith"). To begin with the school was under the control of the kirk session of South Leith Parish Church. It remained so until 1806. It is not known where the school met until 1636 when records make reference to meeting in Trinity House. The school met there until 1710 when, after a disagreement about rent, the kirk session decided to move the school to King James hospital which stood on what is now South Leith Parish churchyard.

In 1792 the kirk agreed to a purpose-built building for the school. The building, by Robert Burn, beside Leith Links, was completed in 1806. The school changed its name to Leith Academy in 1888. The Leith Links school was demolished and replaced by a new building opened in 1898. In turn, due to continued growth in the number of pupils, by 1931 a new building was required and the school on the Duke Street site was built. The Links building is now used as Leith Primary School. The Duke Street school was used as part of Queen Margaret University College and has been (2014) converted to flats. The school's current building, off Easter Road, was completed in 1991 after much campaigning by staff, students and parents.

== Building ==
The current Leith Academy building was completed in May 1991. The building incorporated the design principles of "planning for change" developed by the OECD Programme on Educational Building (PEB). It features an innovative design based around a "Main Street" leading from one end of the school to the other with all departments and facilities, including a swimming pool, leading off it. The Main Street has a glass roof and is lined on either side by plants. These plants were featured on the BBC Television programme The Beechgrove Garden.

In 2016 the school played host to the BBC's The Big Questions.

== Notable alumni ==
- Mark Bonnar, actor
- Kitch Christie, South African rugby union coach
- Forrester Cockburn, professor of paediatrics, University of Glasgow
- Frederick Coutts, General from 1963 to 1969 of the Salvation Army
- Isla Dewar, novelist and screenwriter
- Frank Doran, British Labour MP (Aberdeen North), married to Joan Ruddock
- Leigh Griffiths, footballer
- Sir Peter Heatly CBE, Chairman from 1982 to 1990 of the Commonwealth Games Federation
- Walter Balmer Hislop, artist
- David McLetchie, politician
- Andrew McNeil, footballer
- John David McWilliam, Labour MP for Blaydon (1979–2005)
- Douglas Millings, tailor
- Suzanne Mulvey (formerly Malone) International footballer
- Prof Tom Patten CBE, Vice-Chancellor from 1980 to 1981 of Heriot-Watt University, Professor of Mechanical Engineering from 1967 to 1982, and President from 1991 to 1992 of the Institution of Mechanical Engineers
- Jamie Sives, actor
- George Spence, Canadian politician
- David Torrance, journalist
- Unicorn Kid, (Oliver Sabin), musician
- Jock Wilson (1903–2008), oldest D-Day veteran

=== Grammar School ===
- John Home, minister and writer.
- Robert Jameson, naturalist and mineralogist.
- Andrew MacDonald, poet

== Notable former staff ==
- Peter Comrie FRSE (d.1944) mathematician, Rector 1922-33
- Dr John Mackie FRSE (d.1955) maths teacher then rector, 1933-53
- J K Rowling (b.1965) bestselling author of the Harry Potter series, foreign languages teacher 1990s.
- John W Tait FRSE (1862-1932) rector for over 20 years including the First World War

== See also ==
- List of the oldest schools in the United Kingdom
