= George Robin Henderson =

Scottish mathematician

- Born: 23 April 1941; Caithness
- Died: 21 February 2016 (aged 74); Edinburgh
- Education: Wick High School (Dux); University of Edinburgh (BSc Mathematics & Physics)
- Awards: Honorary Membership of the Scottish Brass Band Association

George Robin Henderson (23 April 1941 – 21 February 2016) was a Scots mathematician with a flair for music. Noted as an inspirational character in his field he taught at Boroughmuir High School, lectured at Napier College, consulted in statistics and published a book.

At Napier he developed a degree in mathematics and engineering technology. He played cornet and tuba, and through the 1980s and 90s as a member of the MacTaggart Scott Works Band he revived the band and pushed them to have a "positive impact on the community"
