= Newhaven, Edinburgh =

Suburb of Edinburgh, Scotland

Coordinates: 55°58′46″N 3°11′36″W

Newhaven
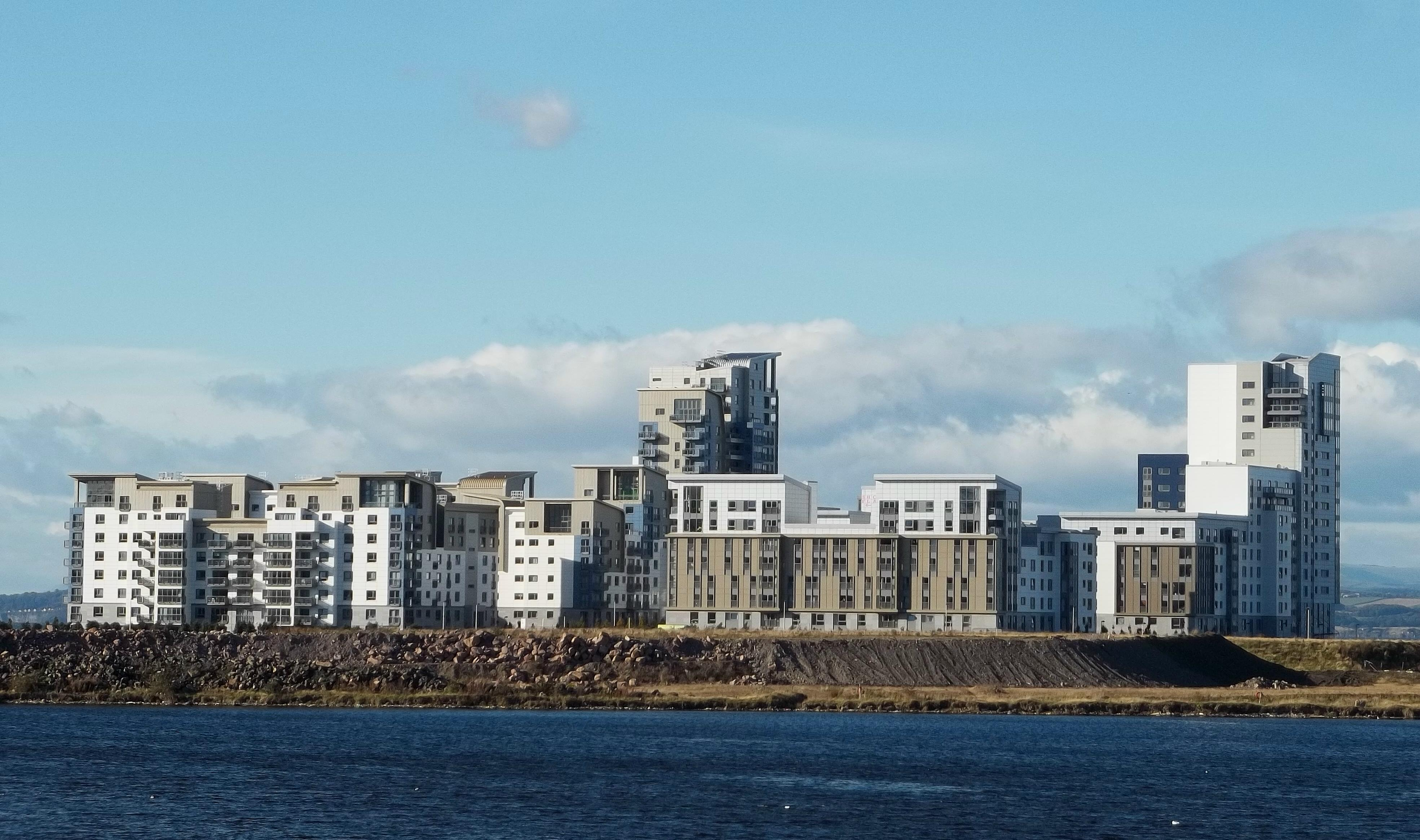
- Newhaven Harbour, October 2010

- Location within the City of Edinburgh council area Location within Scotland
- Community council: Leith Harbour & Newhaven
- Council area: City of Edinburgh
- Lieutenancy area: Edinburgh
- Country: Scotland
- Sovereign state: United Kingdom
- Post town: EDINBURGH
- Postcode district: EH6
- Dialling code: 0131
- Police: Scotland
- Fire: Scottish
- Ambulance: Scottish
- UK Parliament: Edinburgh North and Leith
- Scottish Parliament: Edinburgh Northern and Leith

Newhaven is a district in the capital city of Scotland, Edinburgh, which lies between Leith and Granton and is about 2 miles (3.2 km) north of the city centre of Edinburgh, just north of the Victoria Park district.

Formerly a village and harbour on the Firth of Forth, it had a population of approximately 5,000 inhabitants at the 1991 census. Newhaven was designated a conservation area, one of 40 such areas in Edinburgh, in 1977. It has a very distinctive building form, typical of many Scottish fishing villages, with a "forestair" leading to accommodation at first floor level. The lower ground floor was used for storing nets.

More modern housing dating from the 1960s has replicated the style of these older buildings. Victoria Primary School, created in 1844, is a historic, listed building in Newhaven Main Street and was the oldest council primary school still in use within the City of Edinburgh council area until pupils and staff moved to a new building across in Western Harbour in 2021. It latterly had a school roll of around 145 children. The site has now been acquired under the Community Asset Transfer scheme, by the Heart of Newhaven Community, a volunteer-led charity, who will be running it as a community hub.

The new Western Harbour development extends north into the Firth of Forth from Newhaven. It is also the home of Next Generation Sports Centre (now named David Lloyd Newhaven Harbour).

== History ==
=== Early history ===
The village lies on the line of a prehistoric raised beach. It was part of North Leith Parish, being situated north of the Water of Leith which divided Leith into north and south parishes. It was once a thriving fishing village and a centre for shipbuilding. King James IV wanted to build a Scottish navy, but the existing port of Leith proved unsuitable for large warships. In 1504 he created "Newhavin" (meaning literally "new harbour") as a custom-built port, specifically for the construction of the warship Michael (popularly called the "Great Michael"). The ship was built between 1507 and 1511. The site of the original harbour is the current open space at Fishmarket Square (see photo above).

Surviving walls of the Chapel of St. Mary and St. James, believed to have been built for the dockyard workers and mariners, can still be seen in Lamb's Court and Westmost Close off Main Street. The chapel was ruinous by 1611; the grounds were acquired for use as a graveyard by the Society of Free Fishermen in 1766 and used as such until 1848.

In the reign of James VI the Flemish entrepreneurs Cornelius de Vos and Eustachius Roche set up salt pans at Newhaven to make sea salt. On 13 August 1594, the Dutch ambassadors Walraven III van Brederode and Jacob Valcke arrived at Newhaven and were met by the courtier James Melville of Halhill and the resident agent Adrian Damman.

Between 1572 and 1890, Newhaven was a major port for landing oysters. In 1881, out of a population of 400 fishermen in the village at the time, 17 fishermen from Newhaven, including boats crewed by a father and son(s), or brothers were among the one hundred and eighty-nine who lost their lives in a severe storm, known as the Eyemouth disaster. There were nine widows and 57 children bereaved from those lives lost just in Newhaven.

=== Fishing ===
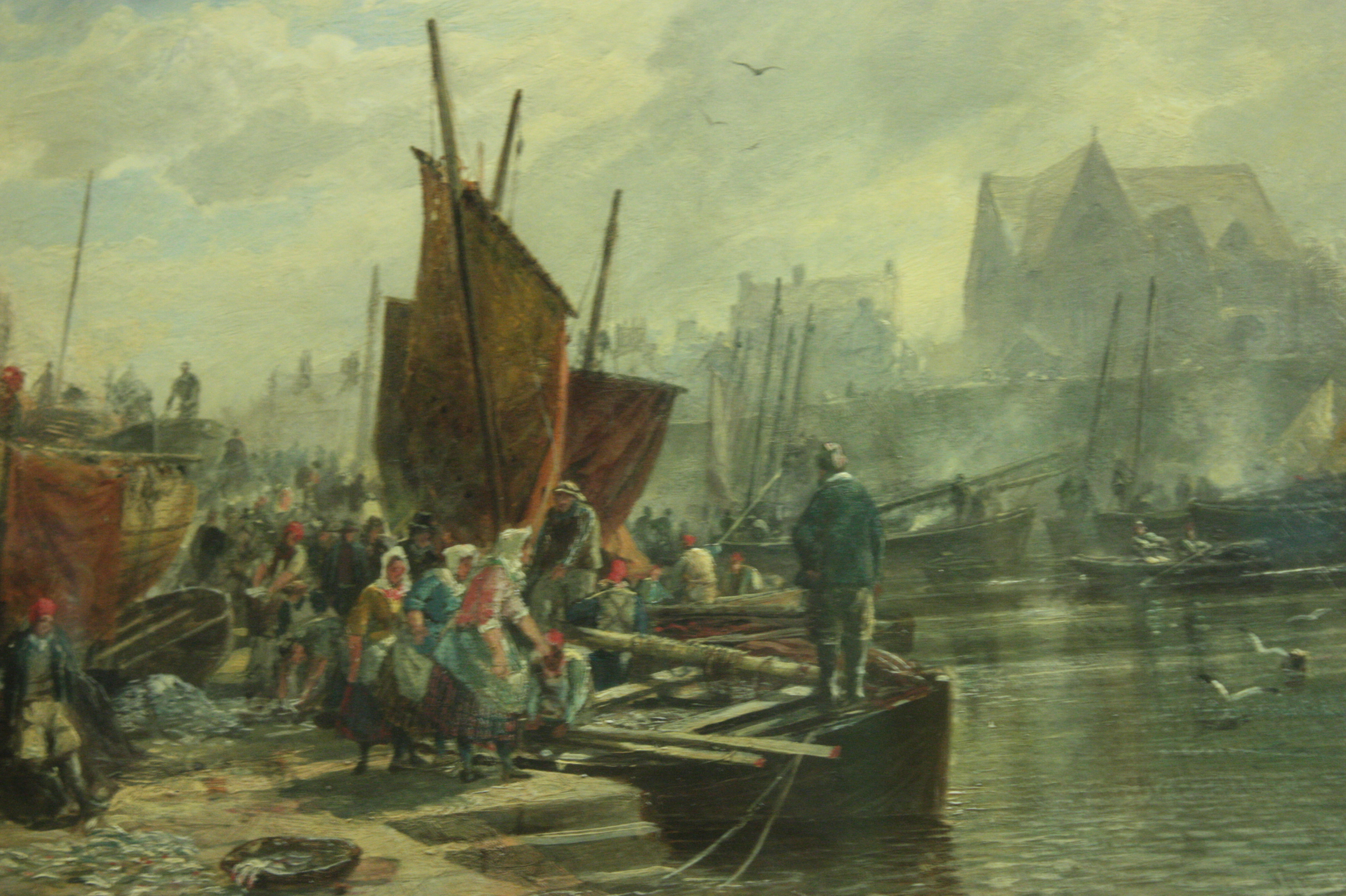
Unloading the Catch (Newhaven Harbour) by Sam Bough 1861

Although close to Edinburgh, the people of Newhaven remained distinctive in dress and tradition. As a result, the village and its residents have been well documented in photographs and postcards intended to show the distinctive local character, notably by the pioneer Victorian photographers David Octavius Hill and Robert Adamson who photographed many of the fishermen and fishwives of Newhaven in both their village surroundings and the partnership's Calton Hill studio in Edinburgh.

The Society of Free Fishermen of Newhaven, dating from at least 1572, was one of the oldest friendly societies in Scotland. It survived until 1989. The history of fishing in Newhaven in the years before the First World War has to be understood in conjunction with that of Granton. Trawling became focussed on Granton, while Newhaven was engaged in herring fishing in the Firth of Forth. From 1901 to 1909 the Board chose to group the results for Newhaven and Granton together. The following statistics refer only to Newhaven - hence the gaps in the data.

Fishery Statistics

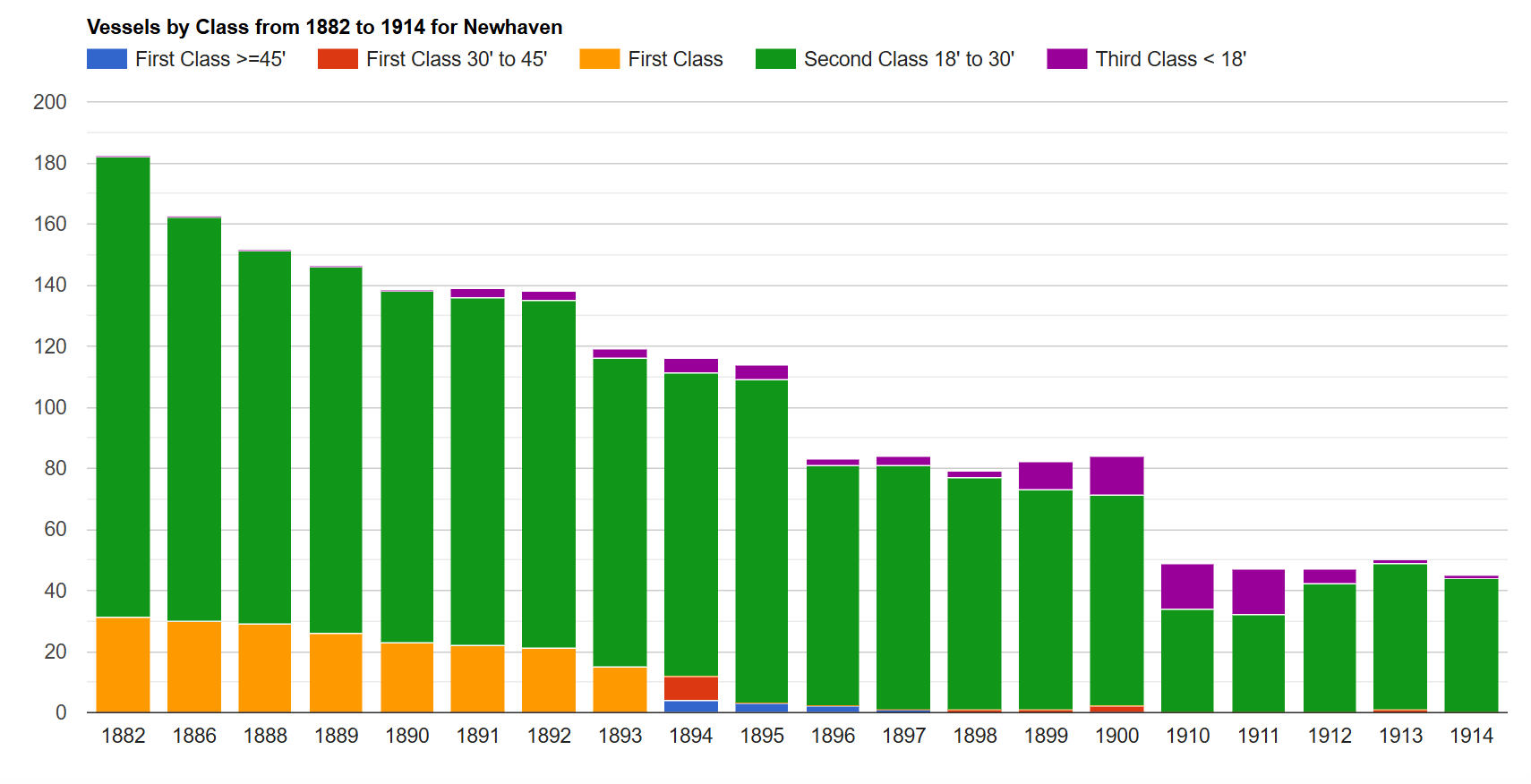
Vessels by class

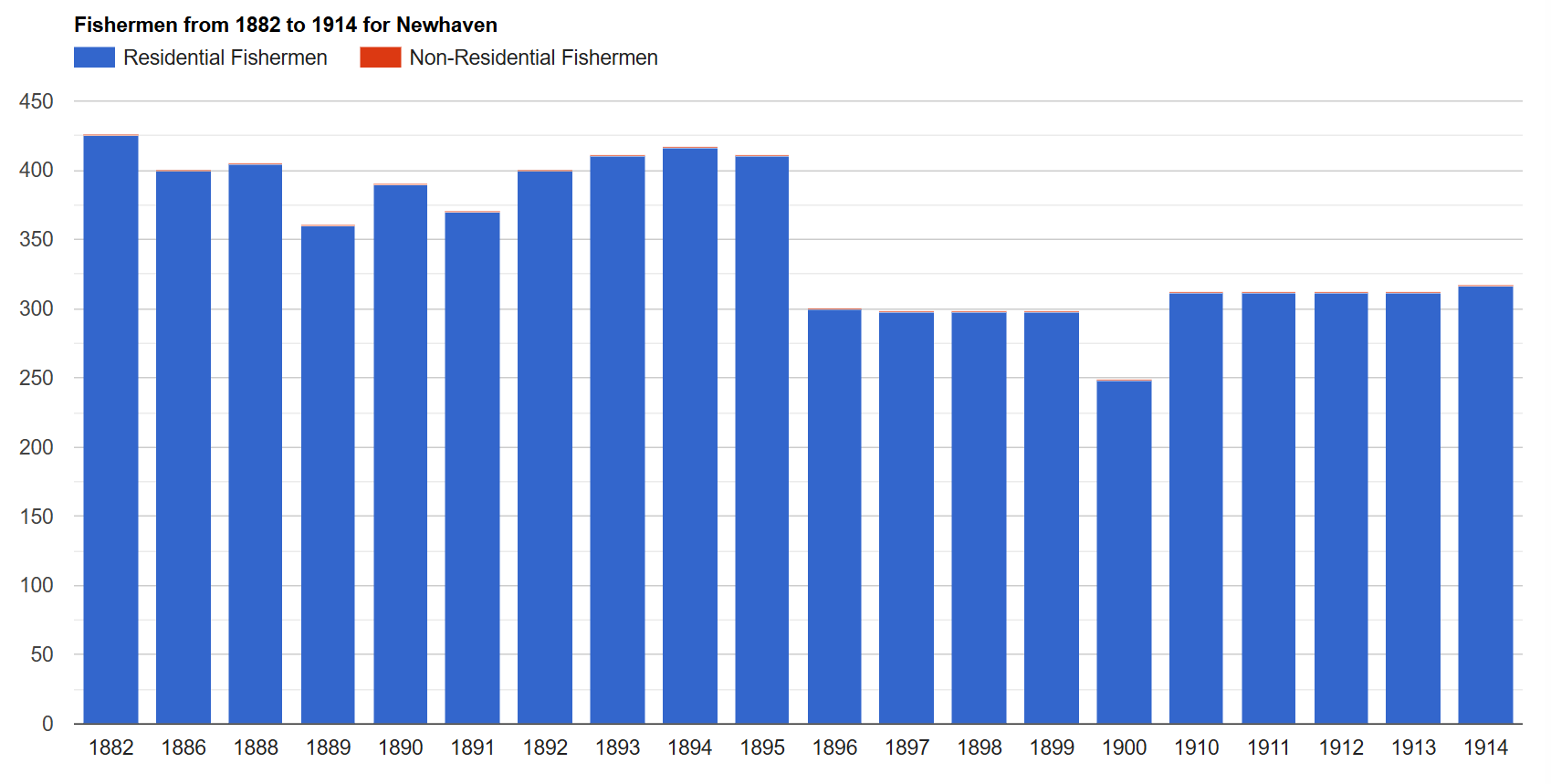
Fishermen

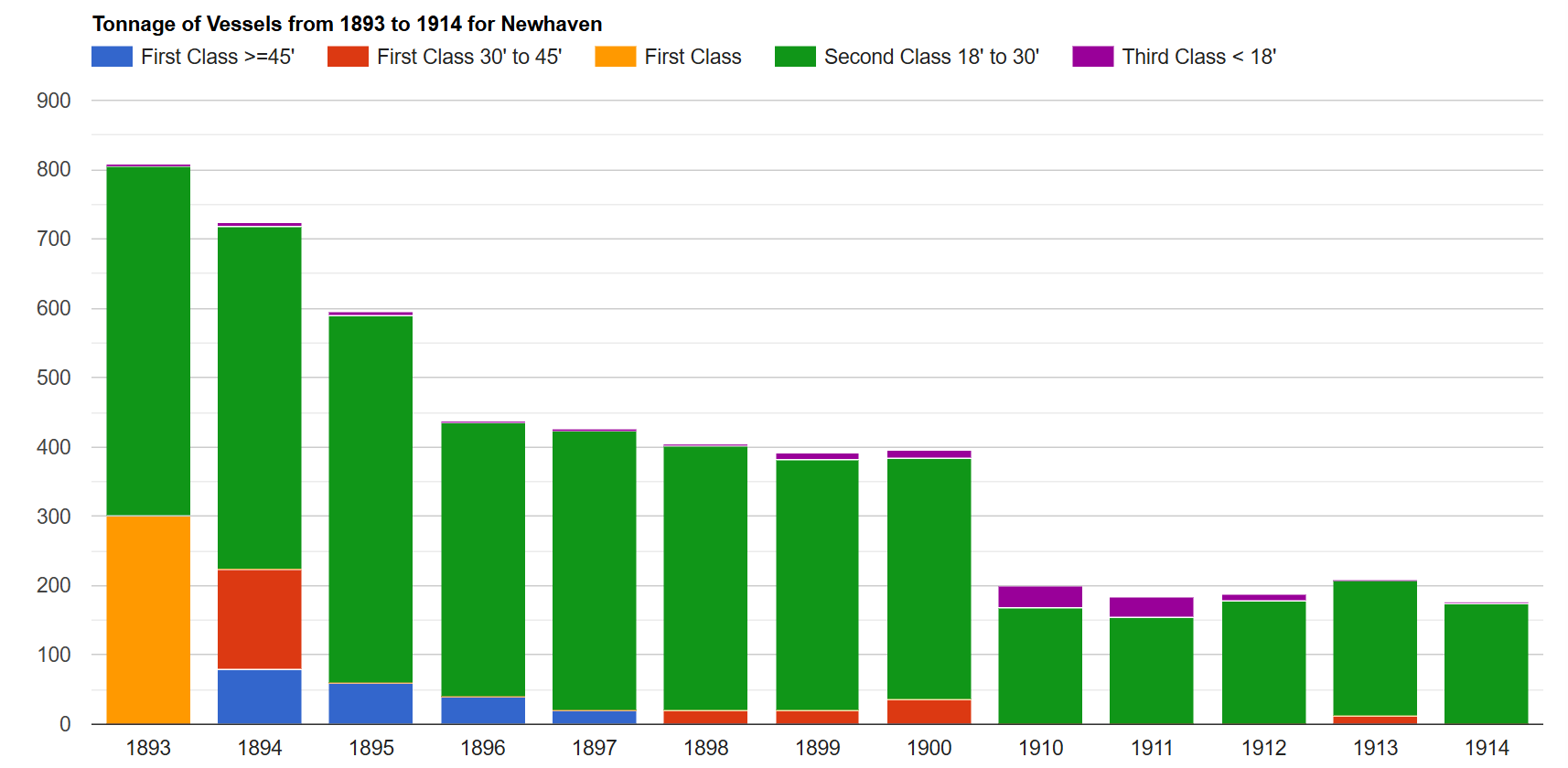
Tonnage of vessels

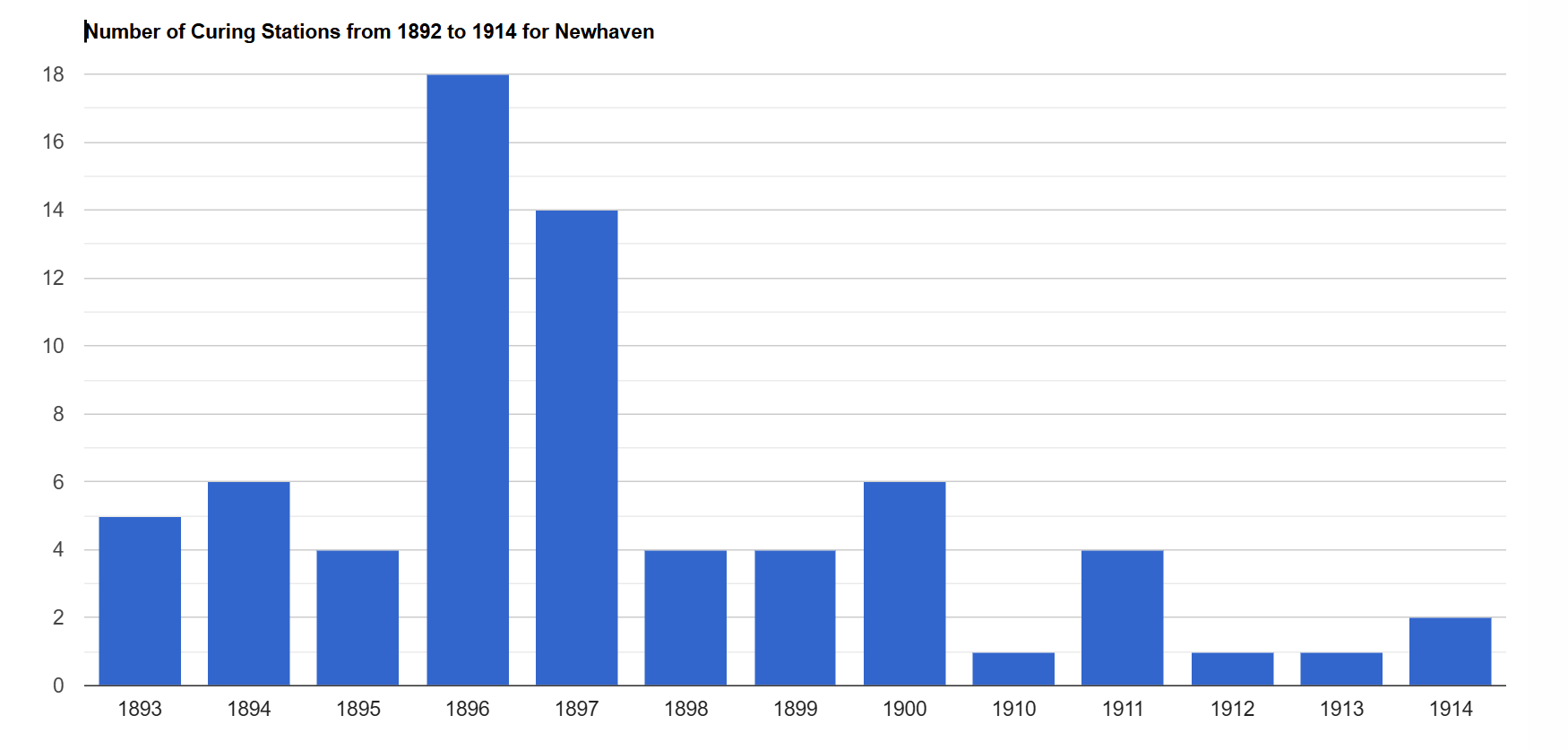
Number of curing stations

=== 19th and 20th centuries ===
Up to the end of the 20th century, pilots of ships on the Firth of Forth traditionally came from a close-knit group of Newhaven families. The early pilots provided their own crews and sailing cutters which were regarded as the fastest and most seaworthy available.

The village was once connected by the Edinburgh, Leith and Newhaven Railway to Edinburgh and Leith, but the line closed in 1956. The station building and platform still exists off Trinity Crescent. Other stations also existed at the end of Annfield and on Craighall Road. It was also connected to Stirling by steamboat managing the 42 miles in just over 3 hours.

The Newhaven fleet also played a role in the whaling industry, recalled in the name "Whale Brae" at the northmost end of Newhaven Road. The whalemaster's house (13) at the centre of what is now Park Road had clear views down to the harbour over the lower buildings to the north. Originally brick built as an oddity and novelty it was later rendered then doubled in size using stone (i.e. unusually the stone section is the extension). It was split into two flats in the 1970s.

=== Recent history ===
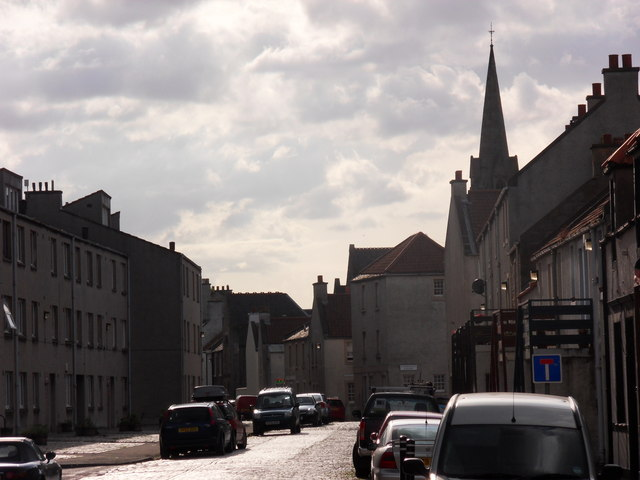
Newhaven main street in August 2009

Newhaven was redeveloped by Edinburgh's town planners in the 1950s and 1960s under the control of both the city architect (for the demolition elements) and Ian Lindsay and Partners (for the reconstruction). Main Street was almost wholly obliterated but rebuilt in "replica" on its north side. The south side was rebuilt as uncompromisingly modern three storey flats in a typically bland 1960s style. Other redevelopment in the area, at New Lane, Great Michael Rise and on Laverockbank Crescent, was the work of the eminent Scottish modern architect Sir Basil Spence.

A 16th century stone armorial panel on the south side of Main Street, known locally as the "Newhaven Stone", appears to have come from the long vanished Trinity Mains Farm, a farm estate linked to Trinity House in Leith whose crest appears on the tablet. The farm gave its name to the adjacent suburb of Trinity. The panel is copied in part on a plaque in the local primary school.

The upper section of the village contained larger villas, looking down over the more crowded village of fishing cottages.

The Victorian fishmarket on the east side of the harbour was rescued from demolition in 1990 by its listing. Originally converted to a huge Harry Ramsden's it is now the Loch Fyne restaurant. The Newhaven Heritage Museum placed in a small room in the northern section did not survive, but the fishmarket function itself has now been revitalised, including a publicly accessible fishmonger.

New development north and north-east of the village has quickly dwarfed the original village, both in the sense of scale and population. Much of the village now looks out onto high-rise modern apartments rather than the Firth of Forth.

=== Transport ===
==== Buses ====
Newhaven is served by Lothian buses: 7 and 11 going direct to the city centre, and the 16/N16 linking to Leith and from there again to the city centre.

==== Tram ====
Newhaven was part of the early 20th century tram route until 1956.

The Edinburgh Trams light rail extension opened to passengers in June 2023 providing connection to the city centre and the airport.

The line terminates at Newhaven tram stop which is located to the north side of Lindsay Road.

Preceding station	Edinburgh Trams	Following station
Terminus	Newhaven – Edinburgh Airport	Ocean Terminal towards Airport

==== Harbour ====
A lighthouse built at the harbour entrance in 1869 is a local landmark. The harbour has now been dwarfed by the enlarged Leith Harbour. The once thriving Victorian fishmarket is now converted into a smaller still functioning fishmarket, and the Loch Fyne restaurant. The Newhaven Heritage Museum which used to occupy a small section of the old fishmarket closed in 2007. It has since been converted into a retail fishmonger, linked to the adjacent fishmarket. Some of its exhibits have been kept by the Victoria Primary School. In 2021, the historical school building was confirmed as a future home for a charity Heart of Newhaven Community following a community grant from the Scottish Land Fund to buy it.

== Heritage events ==
In common with other historical villages, an Annual Gala Day has been held in May or June in Newhaven, with a traditional decorated 'royal barge' bringing the 'Gala Queen' and 'Fisher King' (young children, 'crowned' each year) across the harbour to lead processions, celebrations and music, to the present day

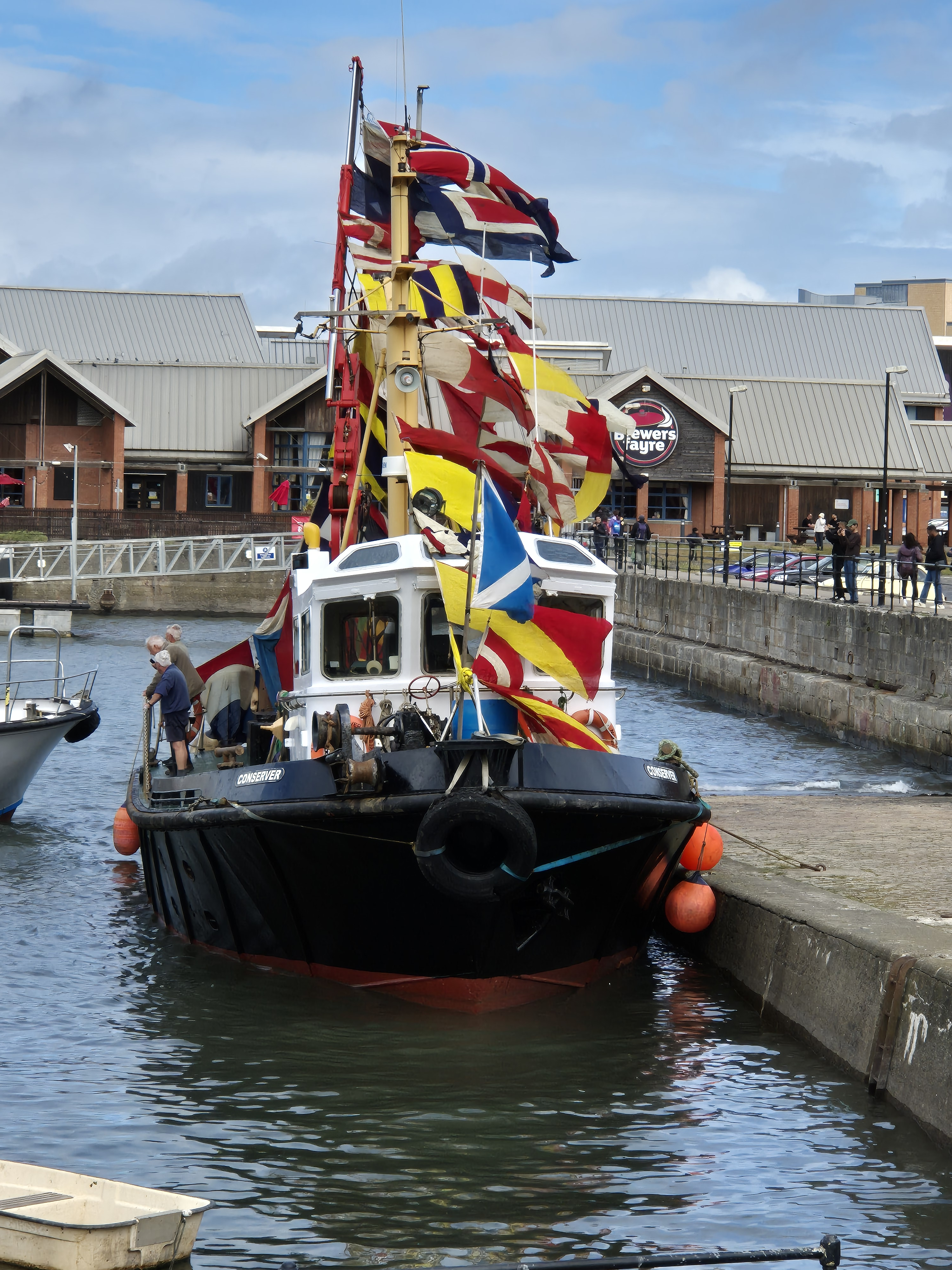
Arrival of the Gala Queen and Fisher King at Newhaven harbour

The war memorial on the side of the Victoria School is the site of annual Armistice Day ceremonies. On 14 October 2021, a 140-year memorial for the men lost in the Eyemouth disaster (and remembering all those lost at sea) is proposed with an appeal for descendants of those lost to take part in person/virtually as some are in USA, Canada and Australia.

== Notable inhabitants ==
- Jimmy Campbell professional football player who was capped for Scotland in 1913
- Hannah Gordon (born 1941), actress
- Jimmy Rutherford (born 1917) volunteer with the International Brigades, executed aged 20
- 17 men lost in the Eyemouth disaster: from The Perseverance (Wooden Lugger LH950): John Wilson Gordon Carnie, William Inglis, Peter Murray Inglis, Johnston Wilson, David Lyle, John Lyle, Boreas Lyon Hall; from The Stormy Petrel (Pilot Boat): David Stevenson, Hugh Stevenson, Philip Stevenson; from Concord (Pilot Boat): John Johnston, James Johnston Walter Johnston; from The Robinas: William Liston, Alexander Noble, William Rutherford, Matthew Main Hume.
