= The Education of Jane Cumming =

British period drama film

- Directed by: Sophie Heldman
- Screenplay by: Flora Nicholson; Sophie Heldman
- Based on: Scotch Verdict by Lillian Faderman
- Produced by: Bettina Brokemper; Karin Koch; Nadira Murray
- Starring: Flora Nicholson; Clare Dunne; Mia Tharia; Fiona Shaw; Sadie Shimmin
- Cinematography: Kate Reid
- Edited by: Isabel Meier
- Music by: Balz Bachmann
- Production companies: Heimatfilm; Dschoint Ventschr Filmproduktion; Sylph Productions
- Release date: 15 February 2026 (Berlinale)
- Countries: Germany; Switzerland; United Kingdom
- Language: English

The Education of Jane Cumming is based on a true story and inspired by the book Scotch Verdict by Lillian Faderman. It is a 2026 period drama film directed by Sophie Heldman, co-written by Heldman and Flora Nicholson and stars Nicholson, Clare Dunne, Mia Tharia, Fiona Shaw, and Sadie Shimmin.

The film had its world premiere at the Panorama section of the 76th Berlin International Film Festival on 15 February 2026.

== Premise ==
The story is based on the real life story of Marianne Woods and Jane Pirie who were accused by their pupil Jane Cumming of lesbianism in Scotland in the early 19th Century.

== Cast ==
- Flora Nicholson as Jane Pirie
- Clare Dunne as Marianne Woods
- Mia Tharia as Jane Cumming
- Fiona Shaw as Lady Cumming Gordon
- Sadie Shimmin as Ann Woods
- Rebecca Martin as Alexandra Dunbar
- Amy Louise Walker as Margot Dunbar
- Eva McMurray as Little Miss Hunter
- Frankie Corio as Mary Cunynghame

== Production ==
The film is written by Flora Nicholson and Sophie Heldman, with Heldman directing and Nicholson a member of the lead cast. It is based on a true story and inspired by the book Scotch Verdict by Lillian Faderman. The real-life story was also an inspiration for Lillian Hellman's 1934 play The Children's Hour. William Wyler adapted the play twice into a feature film, These Three (1936) and The Children's Hour (1961) starring Shirley MacLaine and Audrey Hepburn.

It is a German, Swiss and British co-production produced by Bettina Brokemper of Heimatfilm, Karin Koch of Dschoint Ventschr Filmproduktion and Nadira Murray of Sylph Productions. Alongside Flora Nicholson, Clare Dunne, Mia Tharia and Fiona Shaw are also in the lead cast. Funding also came from the UK Global Screen Fund.

Principal photography took place in Edinburgh, Scotland and surroundings in March and April 2025.

== Release ==
The Education of Jane Cumming had its world premiere at the 76th Berlin International Film Festival on 15 February 2026 and is currently on festival tour. Its theatrical release in multiple territories is planned for early 2027.

== Accolades ==
Award	Date of ceremony	Category	Recipient(s)	Result	Ref.
Teddy Award	20 February 2026	Best Feature Film	Sophie Heldman	Nominated	
Sunny Bunny LGBTQIA+ Film Festival	24 April 2026	Best Feature Film	Sophie Heldman	Won	
Filmkunstfest MV	09 May 2026	Young Talent Award for Best Acting Performance	Mia Tharia	Won	
Fünf Seen Filmfestival	13 September 2026	Audience Award	Sophie Heldman	Won	
Zurich Film Prize	17 September 2026	Best Feature Film	Sophie Heldman	Won	
Dinard Festival du Film	11 October 2026	Hitchcock for Best Performance	Flora Nicholson & Clare Dunne	Won	
Camerimage	14 November 2026	Golden Frog (Directors' Debuts Competition)	Sophie Heldman	Nominated	
Filmnächte Ahrenshoop	14 November 2026	Best Feature Film	Sophie Heldman	Won	
Filmnächte Ahrenshoop	14 November 2026	Audience Award	Sophie Heldman	Won	
British Independent Film Awards	06 December 2026	Best Joint Lead Performance	Flora Nicholson, Clare Dunne, Mia Tharia	Nominated	
