= List of teachers portrayed in films =

The following real-life inspirational/motivational/controversial instructors/mentors have been portrayed in popular films:

- W. H. Balgarnie, inspiration for Mr Chipping, in James Hilton's Goodbye, Mr. Chips and the three movie adaptations (1939, 1969, 2002) of the novella
- Stacey Bess, in the 2010 film Beyond the Blackboard
- Herman Boone and Bill Yoast, high school football coaches portrayed in the 2000 film Remember the Titans
- Bill Bowerman, track and field coach portrayed in the 1998 film Without Limits
- E. R. Braithwaite, British secondary school teacher and visiting professor at Manchester Community College portrayed in the 1967 film To Sir, with Love
- Herb Brooks, hockey coach portrayed in the 1981 TV film Miracle on Ice and the 2004 film Miracle
- Paul "Bear" Bryant, American football coach portrayed in the 2002 television movie The Junction Boys and the 1984 theatrical feature The Bear. Bryant is also a minor character in Forrest Gump, in which he coaches the title character during his college years.
- William Carlock in the 2010 biographical film Temple Grandin
- Ken Carter, education activist and former high school basketball coach portrayed by Samuel L. Jackson in the 2005 film Coach Carter
- Noel Chestnut, track team coach and prison guard portrayed in the 2008 film Racing for Time
- Joe Louis Clark, high school principal credited with the turnaround of a troubled and dangerous New Jersey high school. Clark was portrayed by Morgan Freeman in the 1989 film Lean on Me.
- Ron Clark, portrayed by Matthew Perry in the 2006 film The Ron Clark Story
- Brad Cohen, teacher with Tourette Syndrome, portrayed in the 2008 Hallmark film Front of the Class
- Marva Collins, American educator who in 1975 started Westside Preparatory School in the impoverished Garfield Park neighborhood of Chicago, portrayed in the 1981 docudrama TV movie The Marva Collins Story
- Pat Conroy, teacher and later writer portrayed in 1974 film Conrack and 2006 TV movie The Water Is Wide
- Sarah Grace Cooke, on whom the character Miss Moffatt was closely modeled in the 1945 film and the 1979 made-for-TV movie The Corn Is Green
- Richard Dadier, English teacher portrayed by Glenn Ford in Blackboard Jungle (1955), a film based on Evan Hunter's experience among unruly students at the Bronx Technical High School
- William "Red" Dawson, assistant coach of Marshall University Thundering Herd football portrayed in the 2006 film We Are Marshall
- Bill Dellinger, assistant track and field coach portrayed in the 1997 film Prefontaine
- Pierre Dulaine, dancer and dance educator portrayed in the documentary films Mad Hot Ballroom and Dancing in Jaffa and in the fictionalized film Take the Lead
- Jim Ellis, swimming coach portrayed in the 2007 film Pride
- Jaime Escalante, high school math teacher portrayed in the 1988 film Stand and Deliver
- Gary Gaines, football coach portrayed in the 2004 film Friday Night Lights
- Marilyn Gambrell, parole officer-turned high school teacher portrayed in the 2005 Lifetime movie Fighting the Odds: The Marilyn Gambrell Story
- Larry Gelwix, coach of the Highland Rugby team, featured in the 2008 movie Forever Strong
- Erin Gruwell, high school teacher portrayed in the film Freedom Writers
- Roberta Guaspari, music teacher and violinist portrayed in the 1995 documentary film Small Wonders and 1999 film Music of the Heart
- G. H. Hardy, Cambridge mathematics professor and mentor to Indian mathematician Srinivasa Ramanujan, portrayed in the 2015 film The Man Who Knew Infinity
- Don Haskins, American collegiate basketball coach portrayed in the 2006 film Glory Road
- Ip Man, kung fu grandmaster and teacher, portrayed in the action films Ip Man film series
- LouAnne Johnson, teacher and retired United States Marine, portrayed in the film Dangerous Minds
- Harold Jones, T. L. Hanna High School football coach portrayed in the 2003 film Radio
- Bel Kaufman, author of the novel on which the film Up the Down Staircase (1967) was based, and whose experiences as a teacher for 30 years in New York City schools were the inspiration for the film's main character, Sylvia Barrett, portrayed by Sandy Dennis
- Christina Kay, inspiration for the character Jean Brodie in the 1969 film The Prime of Miss Jean Brodie
- Jack Lengyel, coach of Marshall University Thundering Herd football portrayed in the 2006 film We Are Marshall
- Anna Leonowens, teacher and tutor to the children of Mongkut, King of Siam, portrayed in the 1946 film Anna and the King of Siam, a 1956 film and a 1999 film both entitled The King and I, and the 1999 film Anna and the King
- Mary Kay Letourneau, high school teacher, portrayed in the made-for-TV-movie All-American Girl: The Mary Kay Letourneau Story
- C. S. Lewis, held academic positions teaching English literature at both Cambridge and Oxford, portrayed in the 1993 film Shadowlands by Anthony Hopkins.
- John Edensor Littlewood, professor of mathematics at Cambridge, portrayed by Michael Lieber in the 2014 film Ramanujan and by Toby Jones in the 2015 film The Man Who Knew Infinity
- Lionel Logue, speech therapist who coached George VI, portrayed in The King's Speech (2010).
- Butet Manurung, anthropologist and educator who teaches Orang Rimba children living in Bukit Duabelas National Park, Jambi, to read and count. Portrayed by Prisia Nasution in 2013 drama film The Jungle School.
- Christa McAuliffe, social studies teacher from New Hampshire who was killed aboard the Space Shuttle Challenger disaster in 1986, portrayed by Karen Allen in the 1990 TV movie Challenger
- George McKenna, educator, teacher, administrator, and superintendent, portrayed by Denzel Washington in the 1986 TV film The George McKenna Story
- Jim Morris, high school science teacher and baseball coach who became a major league baseball player after his students encouraged him to try out, portrayed in the 2002 film The Rookie
- John Forbes Nash Jr., mathematics professor at MIT and Princeton portrayed in the 2001 film A Beautiful Mind
- Mickey O'Keefe, boxing coach and police sergeant portraying himself in the 2010 film The Fighter
- J. Robert Oppenheimer, physicist and physics professor, portrayed in the fictionalized biography Oppenheimer (2023).
- Bruce Pandolfini, chess master who instructed young prodigy Joshua Waitzkin, portrayed in the 1993 film Searching for Bobby Fischer
- Samuel Pickering, former teacher at Montgomery Bell Academy, inspiration for the character Mr. Keating, played by Robin Williams in the film Dead Poets Society.
- Jane Pirie and Marianne Woods, inspiration for the characters Martha Dobie and Karen Wright in the 1936 film These Three and the 1961 film The Children's Hour, both based on a play by Lillian Hellman
- Sean Porter, Kilpatrick Mustangs' coach and corrections officer portrayed in the 2006 film Gridiron Gang
- William Pleeth, cello teacher of Jacqueline du Pré, portrayed in the 1998 film Hillary and Jackie about du Pré and her sister.
- Freida J. Riley, teacher who inspired a love for science and mathematics in her rural West Virginia high school students, particularly future NASA engineer Homer Hickam, in the 1999 film October Sky
- Knute Rockne, football coach portrayed in the 1940 film Knute Rockne, All American
- Ben Schwartzwalder, football coach portrayed in the 2008 film The Express: The Ernie Davis Story
- Catana Starks, former Tennessee State Tigers swim coach, who became the first woman ever to coach a college men's golf team in the 2014 film From the Rough
- Iris Stevenson, award-winning choir instructor portrayed in the 1993 film Sister Act 2: Back in the Habit
- Anne Sullivan, teacher and mentor to Helen Keller, a blind and deaf girl, portrayed in the 1962 film The Miracle Worker and remakes in 1979 and 2000
- J. R. R. Tolkien, professor of languages and literature at Leeds and Oxford, featured in the 2019 film Tolkien
- Melvin B. Tolson, debating coach and teacher who was featured in 2007 film The Great Debaters
- Maria von Trapp, music teacher for her Austrian family, and previously a teacher at the Nonnberg Abbey, portrayed in the 1956 film The Trapp Family, the 1958 film The Trapp Family in America, and the 1965 film The Sound of Music
- Jim Valvano, basketball coach portrayed in the 1996 television movie Never Give Up: The Jimmy V Story
- Dick Vermeil, football coach portrayed in the 2006 film Invincible and the 2021 film American Underdog
- Jim White, high school cross country coach at McFarland High School portrayed by Kevin Costner in the 2015 film McFarland, USA
- Marvin Wood, basketball coach portrayed in the 1986 film Hoosiers as Norman Dale
- Marianne Woods (see Jane Pirie in this list)
- Zhang Guimei, educator, portrayed in the 2023 film Beyond the Clouds
