= Bad Gays =

Queer history podcast

- Genre: LGBTQ; history; human interest; culture
- Language: English

Cast and voices
- Hosted by: Huw Lemmey; Ben Miller

Production
- Length: 45–90 minutes (approximate)

Publication
- Original release: April 19, 2019
- Updates: Fortnightly

Related
- Website: badgayspod.com

Bad Gays is a queer history podcast about "evil and complicated queers" in history hosted by Huw Lemmey and Ben Miller.

Each episode of Bad Gays explores the story of a complicated queer person in history.

== Reception ==
The Advocate listed Bad Gays in its 2023 list of "Five Gloriously Gay Podcasts You Need To Listen To." Bad Gays was also reviewed by Vice Media, Another Magazine, Vox Media, The Washington Post, and The Boar.

== Book ==
Based on research for the podcast, Lemmey and Miller wrote a book, Bad Gays: A Homosexual History, published by Verso Books. The book won the 2022 Goodreads Choice Award for History and Biography.

== Episodes ==
Season One
Episode number	Topic	Release date	Ref
1	Ernst Röhm	March 19, 2019	
2	Lord Alfred Douglas	March 26, 2019	
3	T. E. Lawrence	April 2, 2019	
4	James VI and I	April 9, 2019	
5	Andrew Sullivan	April 16, 2019	
6	Anthony Blunt	April 23, 2019	
7	Friedrich Radszuweit	April 30, 2019	
8	Ronnie Kray	May 7, 2019	
9	Leopold and Loeb	May 14, 2019	
10	Roy Cohn	May 21, 2019	
Bonus	Andy Warhol	June 24, 2019	

Season Two
Episode number	Topic	Release date	Ref
1	Alexander the Great	September 24, 2019	
2	Andrew Cunanan	October 1, 2019	
3	Pietro Aretino	October 8, 2019	
4	Frederick the Great	October 15, 2019	
5	Charles George Gordon	October 22, 2019	
6	Pim Fortuyn	October 29, 2019	
7	Nicky Crane	November 5, 2019	
8	The Stonewall Colony	November 12, 2019	
9	Piers Gaveston	November 19, 2019	
10	J. Edgar Hoover	November 27, 2019	
Bonus	Victor Barker	December 25, 2019	
Bonus	Pete Buttigieg	January 29, 2020	

Season Three
Episode number	Topic	Release date	Ref
1	Nikolai Yezhov	March 24, 2020	
2	James Buchanan	March 31, 2020	
3	Robert Stewart, Viscount Castlereagh	April 7, 2020	
4	Barney Frank	April 14, 2020	
5	Elmyr de Hory	April 21, 2020	
6	Philip Johnson	April 28, 2020	
7	Roger Casement	May 4, 2020	
8	Aileen Wuornos	May 11, 2020	
9	Morrissey	May 19, 2020	
10	Lisa Miller	May 26, 2020	
Bonus	Radclyffe Hall	July 28, 2020	
Bonus	John Maynard Keynes	September 1, 2020	

Season Four
Episode number	Topic	Release date	Ref
1	Cecil Rhodes	October 20, 2020	
2	Liberace	October 27, 2020	
3	Jeremy Thorpe	November 3, 2020	
4	Benjamin Britten	November 10, 2020	
5	Carl Van Vechten	November 17, 2020	
6	Truman Capote	November 24, 2020	
7	Prince Albert Victor	December 1, 2020	
8	Gertrude Stein	December 8, 2020	
9	Camilla Hall	December 14, 2020	
10	Violette Morris	December 22, 2020	
Bonus	Dennis Cooper	February 23, 2021	
Bonus	Arthur Gary Bishop	April 13, 2021	
Bonus	Pacchierotto (15th century sodomite)	August 10, 2021	

Season Five
Episode number	Topic	Release date	Ref
1	Francis Bacon	December 24, 2021	
2	Joe Carstairs	January 4, 2022	
3	Ernst vom Rath	January 11, 2022	
4	Philipp, Prince of Eulenburg	January 18, 2022	
5	Anne Bonny	January 25, 2022	
6	Franco Zeffirelli	February 1, 2022	
7	Freddie Mercury	February 8, 2022	
8	Cressida Dick	February 22, 2022	
9	Cressida Dick	February 22, 2022	
10	John Wojtowicz	March 1, 2022	
11	Jeffrey Dahmer	March 15, 2022	
Bonus	Eugen Sandow	June 1, 2022	
Bonus	Magnus Hirschfeld	October 5, 2022	
Live Show	Jack Saul	December 25, 2022	

Season Six
Episode number	Topic	Release date	Ref
1	George Santos	March 20, 2023	
2	Julie d'Aubigny	March 28, 2023	
3	Jorge Horacio Ballvé Piñero	April 4, 2023	
4	Mustapha Ben Ismaïl	April 11, 2023	
5	André Gide	April 25, 2023	
6	Griselda Blanco	May 2, 2023	
7	Tom Driberg	May 9, 2023	
8	Dong Xian	May 16, 2023	
9	Tokugawa Iemitsu	May 30, 2023	
10	Benedetta Carlini	June 6, 2023	
Live Show	Simeon Solomon, Sascha Schneider	December 25, 2023	

Season Seven
Episode number	Topic	Release date	Ref
1	Karl Lagerfeld	February 13, 2024	
2	Joe Orton and Kenneth Halliwell	February 20, 2024	
3	Ahebi Ugbabe	February 27, 2024	
4	Elagabalus	March 5, 2024	
5	James Levine	March 12, 2024	
6	John Whitgift	March 19, 2024	
7	Marthe Hanau	April 2, 2024	
8	Qutbuddin Mubarak Shah	April 9, 2024	
9	Franz Nopcsa von Felső-Szilvás	April 18, 2024	
10	Rotha Lintorn-Orman	April 25, 2024	
Bonus	Christopher Marlowe	June 25, 2024	
Bonus	Jerome Robbins	August 25, 2024	
Bonus	Marianne Woods and Jane Pirie	October 30, 2024	

Season Eight
Episode number	Topic	Release date	Ref
1	Olive Yang	December 23, 2024	
2	Tom Mitford	December 30, 2024	
3	Elisar von Kupffer	January 7, 2025	
4	Albrecht Muth	January 14, 2025	
5	Reed Erickson	January 20, 2025	
6	Abd al-Ilah	January 29, 2025	
7	Larry Kramer	February 5, 2025	
8	Anne Lister	February 11, 2025	
9	Adele Spitzeder	February 19, 2025	
10	Jacques de Molay	March 11, 2025	
Bonus	Alexander von Humboldt	April 30, 2025	
Bonus	Gavin Arthur	June 10, 2025	
Bonus	Coil	August 12, 2025	

Season Nine
Episode number	Topic	Release date	Ref
1	Little Richard	November 04, 2025	
2	Dorian Corey	November 11, 2025	
3	Charles Hitchen	November 18, 2025	
4	Jacob Israël de Haan	November 25, 2025	
5	Angela Calomiris	December 01, 2025	
6	Tracey Wigginton	December 16, 2025	
7	Captain Moonlite	December 23, 2025	
8	E. M. Forster	December 30, 2025	
9	William Beckford	February 3, 2026	
10	Tom of Finland	February 10, 2026	
Bonus	Daniel Dunglas Home	Apr 2, 2026	

Season Ten
Episode number	Topic	Release date	Ref
1	Peter Mandelson	April 29, 2026
2	Peter Mandelson	May 6, 2026
3	Peter Mandelson	May 13, 2026
4	Peter Mandelson	May 20, 2026
5	Peter Mandelson	May 27, 2026
6	Peter Mandelson	June 3, 2026
