= Maud Galt =

Scottish woman accused of witchcraft

- Born: c. 1620
- Died: c. 1670
- Years active: mid 17th century
- Known for: Scottish lesbian accused of witchcraft
- Spouse: John Dickie

Maud Galt (c. 1620 – c. 1670) was a lesbian accused of witchcraft in Kilbarchan, Scotland.

== Biography ==
Maud Galt lived in Kilbarchan, Scotland in the mid 17th century. She hid her sexual identity by marrying John Dickie, a wright.

The couple lived with their two servants. Galt had a relationship with one of her servants, Agnes Mitchell.

She was accused of witchcraft when Mitchell lodged a complaint against her employer at a Kirk Session in September 1649. Mitchell claimed that Galt had been:

‘abusing ane of hir servants with ane peis of clay formed lyk the secreit member of ane man’

At the Kirk Session, Mitchell presented several of their neighbours with the clay phallus Galt supposedly used on her. She stated that the shame of the 'injury done to her' had hindered her from reporting any of this to the local laird.

"Women throughout Europe had been burned for possession of such prostheses, especially when used while cross-dressed. This specifically represents the idea of ‘counterfeiting the office of husband', a type of deception in which the woman threatened to replace the man, not only economically but sexually".

Two neighbours testified to Mitchell's complaint. Marion Semphill had intervened in an argument between Mitchell and Galt to discourage Mitchell going to complain to the laird. Several people also reported 'suffering misfortune' following crossing Galt, suggesting she could have been an assertive character.

== Charged with witchcraft ==
The charges against Galt ran to several pages, with Mitchell describing multiple instances in which Galt allegedly attempted to rape several servants, and the servants of her neighbours also.

Having listened to these allegations, the Privy Council abandoned the issue and decided to investigate the case under the charge of witchcraft. For historian Julian Goodare, Galt's case demonstrated "the shocked authorities found the idea of witchcraft easier to cope with than lesbianism."

The presbytery of Glasgow sent the witness testimonies and a supplication to 'the rycht honorable Comite of Estaites or Lords of His majesties Priwie Council' requesting a commission to try Maud Galt.

However, there is no evidence of a commission being granted for her trial so the case may have been dropped. Yet, handling requests to try accused witches could be a lengthy process, not least as a result of uncertainty at a local level about which central government body was responsible for granting commissions.

No further legal action in regards to Maud Galt is recorded.

She died c. 1670.

== Historical significance ==
Given that women were burned to death elsewhere in Europe when faced with similar allegations, Galt's case resulting in no legal ramifications in 17th century Scotland is all the more surprising and unusual.

Beyond this, Brian Dempsey, Lecturer at the University of Dundee wrote for History Scotland that:

"Although Scotland possesses rich sources for lesbian, gay, bisexual and/or transexual (lgbt) history, this is a sadly neglected aspect of our national history... Women-loving women are particularly difficult to find in the Scottish records".

The Biographical Dictionary of Scottish Women only records eleven entries under 'sexuality'. Jackie Foster is the only entry positively identified as a lesbian with Maud Galt, Jane Pirie and Marianne Woods (whose story was made famous as the inspiration for Lillian Hellman's 1934 play 'The Children's Hour') "accused" of lesbianism.

In this context, Galt's case has significance and "has the potential to inform Scottish social history in general".
