= History of homosexuality in American film =

Since the transition into the modern-day gay rights movement, homosexuality has appeared more frequently in American film and cinema.

One of the current movements in LGBTQ cinema is to ensure that LGBTQ actors are employed to play queer roles; roles that have been historically almost exclusively been portrayed by straight actors, complicating authentic representation for gay people among fictional characters.

== Early films and productions ==
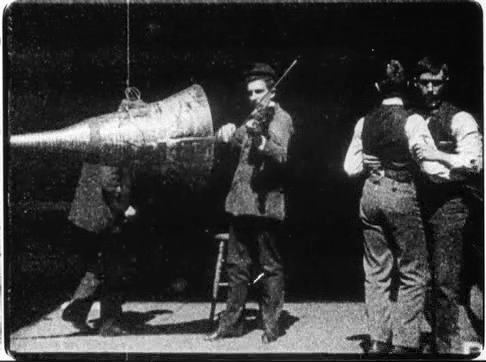
The Dickson Experimental Sound Film (1895)

The first notable suggestion of homosexuality on film was in 1895, when two men were shown dancing together in the William Kennedy Dickson motion picture The Dickson Experimental Sound Film, commonly labeled online and in three published books as The Gay Brothers. At the time, the men were not seen as "queer" or even flamboyant, but merely as acting fancifully. However, film critic Parker Tyler stated that the scene "shocked audiences with its subversion of conventional male behavior". During the late 19th century and into the 1920s and 30s, homosexuality was largely depicted through gender-based conventions and stereotypes. Oftentimes male characters intended to be identified as gay were flamboyant, effeminate, humorous characters on film. The terms "pansy" and "sissy" became tagged to homosexuality and described "a flowery, fussy, effeminate soul given to limp wrists and mincing steps". Because of his high-pitched voice and attitude, the pansy easily transitioned from the silent film era to the talking pictures where those characteristics could be taken advantage of. Gay male characters were depicted as having stereotypically feminine jobs, such as a tailor, hairdresser, or choreographer; reinforcing the stereotype that gay men were limited to certain careers. Lesbian characters did not have a title like gay men, but were still associated with crossdressing, a deep voice, and having a stereotypically masculine job.

The first erotic kiss between two members of the same sex in a film was in Cecil B. DeMille's Manslaughter (1922). Marlene Dietrich was the first leading lady to kiss another female on screen in 1930's Morocco. During the period of the Great Depression in the 1930s, the cinema audience had significantly waned. Filmmakers produced movies with themes and images that had high shock value to prompt people to return to the theaters. This called for the inclusion of more controversial topics such as prostitution and violence, creating a demand for pansies and their lesbian counterparts to stimulate or shock audiences. With the new influx of these provocative subjects, debates arose regarding the negative effects these films could have on American society.

It was during this same time that the United States Supreme Court ruled in the 1915 case Mutual Film Corp. v. Industrial Commission of Ohio that films did not have First Amendment protection, due to the film industry being a business that could be easily used for "evil", and several local governments passed laws restricting the public exhibition of "indecent" or "immoral" films. The media publicity surrounding several high-profile celebrity scandals and the danger of church-led boycotts also pressured the leadership within the film industry to establish a national censorship board, which became the Motion Picture Production Code.

The Motion Picture Production Code, also simply known as the Production Code or as the "Hays Code", was established both to curtail additional government censorship and to prevent the loss of revenue from boycotts led by the Catholic Church and fundamentalist Protestant groups, who had wanted to judge the moral impact of Hollywood cinema on the general public. In terms of homosexuality, the code marked the end of the "pansy" characters and the beginning of depictions that were more reserved and buried within subtext. While the code did not explicitly state that depictions of homosexuality were against the code, the code barred the depiction of any kind of sexual perversion or deviance, which homosexuality fell under at the time. Gay characters on screen also came to be represented as villains or victims who commit crimes due to their homosexuality. Per the production code these homosexual villains would have to be punished by the law to coincide with the code's rule stating that films could not place crime above law. An example of the enforcement of the production code is the character Joel Cairo in the 1941 film The Maltese Falcon. In the original novel the character is clearly homosexual, though in the movie his homosexuality is made vague. The production code not only affected what was cut from movies containing homosexual characters, but also often removed them completely. The stage play The Children's Hour by Lillian Hellman was released as a film in 1936 titled These Three directed by William Wyler. The stage play contained a storyline of two teachers being accused of having a lesbian affair, yet the film version created a heterosexual love triangle between two women and one man. Critics came to favor the production code as it allowed for unsavory behaviors to be eliminated from the public eye. Many critics stated that the film version of The Children's Hour was more enjoyable with the absence of the lesbian characters when compared to the original stage play.

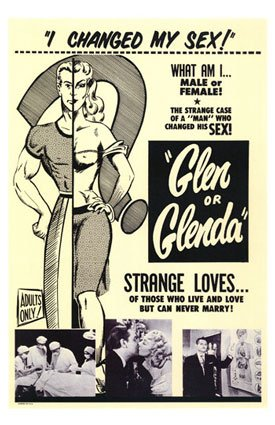
Poster for Glen or Glenda (1953)

Sean Griffin, author of Tinker Belles and Evil Queens: The Walt Disney Company from the Inside Out, said Disney's cartoon Ferdinand the Bull (1939) is "not necessarily gay, but it's definitely queer". The short film depicts a "sleepy eyed bull who doesn't conform to expectations of masculinity". Nico Lang of Harper's Bazaar said Disney's 1941 film The Reluctant Dragon "is extremely queer, even if it's not necessarily gay". He also noted the inclusion of a gay couple (two male antelopes) in Zootopia.

=== Early gender-role reversals ===
The time period prior to the Hays code included gender role-reversal productions, most notably Charlie Chaplin's A Woman (1915), in which Chaplin dresses as a woman and plays with the affections of men. Films such as Miss Fatty (1915), featuring Fatty Arbuckle, and Sweedie (1914–16), starring Academy Award-winning actor Wallace Beery, created a comedic view of drag that audiences found entertaining. However, with the establishment of the Hollywood Production Code, drag depictions almost disappeared from mainstream commercial films. Various other notable drag films of the early to mid-20th century include:

- A Florida Enchantment (1914), directed by and starring Sidney Drew
- Mabel's Blunder (1914), directed by and starring Mabel Normand
- Charley's Aunt (1915), based on the stage play and starring Oliver Hardy
- Morocco (1930), starring Marlene Dietrich, in which she performs a song in tuxedo and kisses another woman
- Queen Christina (1933), directed by Rouben Mamoulian and starring Greta Garbo
- Wonder Bar (1934), starring Al Jolson, features a brief, but explicit homosexual reference
- Sylvia Scarlett (1936), starring Katharine Hepburn, a widely unsuccessful film, but significant due to the female-to-male transformation
- I Was a Male War Bride (1949), directed by Howard Hawks and starring Cary Grant as a French officer who must impersonate a female war bride
- Glen or Glenda (1953), a film by Ed Wood starring himself
- Some Like It Hot (1959), featuring Tony Curtis, Marilyn Monroe, and Jack Lemmon

From 1950 to 1956 Jerry Lewis appeared in several film remakes in roles originally written for women. He appeared in drag in the films At War with the Army, Scared Stiff, and Money From Home and routinely adopted effeminate mannerisms and gender ambiguous role-playing with his partner Dean Martin. He was criticized by the press for his 'prancing and mincing' homosexual references.

=== World War II era to 1960s ===
During the Second World War and the subsequent Cold War, Hollywood increasingly depicted gay men and women as sadists, psychopaths, and nefarious, anti-social villains. These depictions were driven by the censorship of the code, which was willing to allow "sexual perversion" if it was depicted in a negative manner, as well as the fact that homosexuality was classified as a mental illness and gay men and women were often harassed by the police. This can be examined in Alfred Hitchcock's 1948 film Rope. In his article "The History of Gays and Lesbians on Film", author Daniel Mangin explains:

In the film, Jimmy Stewart plays a dabbler in philosophy who introduces the two boys to the "Superman" theory of the superiority of some humans over others. He becomes horrified when he realizes that the theories he espoused have led to murder. His character's somewhat hysterical repudiation of his formerly held beliefs mirrored the fears of some Americans about the infiltration of alien ideas. That the homosexuals in Rope were connected to the arts, as were many of those investigated, seems apt in view of longstanding suspicions about the politics and sexual practices of people so engaged.

The censorship code gradually became liberalized during the 1950s and 1960s, until it was replaced by the current classification system established by the Motion Picture Association of America in 1968. Legally, it was the 1952 case Joseph Burstyn, Inc. v. Wilson that extended First Amendment legal protection to films, reversing its original verdict, and, via a separate case in 1948, United States v. Paramount Pictures, Inc., ended the once common practice of film studios owning the theaters. That practice had made it difficult for films produced outside of these studios, such as independent or international films, to be screened widely, let alone to be commercially successful.

Culturally, American consumers were increasingly less likely to boycott a film at the request of the Catholic Church or fundamentalist Protestant groups. This meant that films with objectionable content did not necessarily need the approval of the Hollywood Production Code or religious groups to be successful. As a result, Hollywood gradually became more willing to ignore the code to compete with television and the growing access to independent and international cinema.

During the 1950s–60s, gay characters in American films were identified with more overtly sexual innuendos and methods (e.g., a reference in The Seven Year Itch (1955) to two male tenants who are "interior decorators or something"), but having a gay or bisexual sexual orientation was largely treated as a trait of miserable and suicidal misfits who frequently killed themselves or other people.

During this post-war era, mainstream American cinema might have advocated tolerance for eccentric, sensitive young men wrongly accused of homosexuality, such as in the film adaptation of Tea and Sympathy (1956), but gay characters were frequently eliminated from the final cut of the film or depicted as dangerous misfits who would fall prey to a well-deserved violent end. Others had homosexual themes almost completely removed such as in the 1958 film adaptation of Cat on a Hot Tin Roof, which sees the plot surrounding Paul Newman's character of Brick coping with the death of his friend Skipper, a man he is alluded to having had feelings for, changed to themes of immaturity and grief of a friend. An early example of homoeroticism in American film was 1957's The Strange One.

The code was relaxed somewhat after 1961, and the next year William Wyler remade a more faithful adaptation of The Children's Hour with Audrey Hepburn and Shirley MacLaine. After MacLaine's character admits her love for Hepburn's, she hangs herself; this set a precedent for miserable endings in films addressing homosexuality. Advise & Consent (1962) depicted a married senator who is being blackmailed over a wartime homosexual affair, and was the first mainstream American movie to show a gay bar.

The film Lawrence of Arabia in 1962, widely seen as one of the best films ever created, was revolutionary for several reasons including depicting not only a character who is heavily implied to be gay, but also implying a relationship between two men. Though T.E. Lawrence's sexuality remains ambiguous, director David Lean had Peter O'Toole play his version of the desert hero as a gay man. Beyond this, Lean also implied a relationship between Lawrence and his companion Sherif Ali, played by Omar Sharif. Years later, when asked about the homosexuality in his hit film, Lean commented, "Throughout, Lawrence was very, if not entirely, homosexual. We thought we were being very daring at the time: Lawrence and Omar..." This is one of the first examples of an LGBT+ film being a box office success without an incredible amount of innuendo to disguise the homosexual nature of the film. The Best Man (1964), where a character, played by Cliff Robertson, is accused of being homosexual, was the first American film to use the word "homosexual".

Brock Peters played one of the first expressly homosexual characters in an American film in The Pawnbroker in 1964. Inside Daisy Clover in 1965, based on the novel of the same name, was another early example to depict an expressly gay or bisexual character who, while forced to marry a woman for his career, is not uncomfortable with his sexual orientation and does not commit suicide or fall victim to murder. Yet, beyond a few lines of dialogue, the character's bisexuality was largely restricted to bits of subtext and innuendo.

Homosexuality began to become more prominent in film including in films such as Reflections in a Golden Eye (1967), The Detective, The Legend of Lylah Clare, P.J., and The Sergeant (all 1968) and The Killing of Sister George (also 1968) became the first English-language film to have consenting adult homosexuals as the focus of the film.

In America, efforts at creating complex gay or bisexual film characters were largely restricted to people such as Andy Warhol and Kenneth Anger. However, mainstream American cinema efforts at marketing films for an LGBT audience did not begin until the 1970s.

== After Stonewall ==
Following the 1969 Stonewall riots in New York City and its catapulting of the gay liberation movement, Hollywood began to look at gay people as a possible consumer demographic. It was also in the 1970s that some anti-gay laws and prejudicial attitudes changed through the work of an increasingly visible LGBT-rights movement and overall attitudes in America about human sexuality, sex and gender roles changed as a result of LGBT-rights, women's liberation and the sexual revolution.

Movies including gay content and sex became more critically successful during this time, with the film Midnight Cowboy (1969) featuring multiple moments of homosexual characters and themes, albeit in what some deem problematic ways, finding success in the awards circuit, earning 6 Academy Award nominations and winning the awards for Best Picture, Directing, and an award for Writing.

The Boys in the Band (1970) was the first attempt of Hollywood to market a film to gay consumers and present an honest look at what it meant to be a gay or bisexual man in the United States. The film, based on a play of the same name, was often hailed in the mainstream press as presenting a "landmark of truths", but was often criticized for reinforcing certain anti-gay stereotypes and for failing to deal with LGBT-rights and showing a group of gay and bisexual men who are all unhappy, miserable, and spiteful.

In contrast, Fortune and Men's Eyes (1971), was co-produced by MGM, dealt with the issue of homosexuality in prison, and depicted gays in a relatively "open and realistic, non-stereotypical and non-caricatured manner".

Despite the criticism and setbacks with The Boys in the Band film, the treatment of homosexuality in mainstream American film did gradually improve during the 1970s, especially if the film was directed at a gay audience (i.e. A Very Natural Thing (1973)), or a more cosmopolitan-liberal audience (i.e. Something for Everyone (1970), Cabaret (1972) and Ode to Billy Joe (1976)).

Despite the growing tolerance of homosexuality during the 1970s, some Hollywood films throughout the decade still depicted homosexuality as an insult or a joke. Gay characters were sometimes depicted in mainstream films as dangerous misfits who needed to be cured or killed. Some films would even use anti-gay derogatory comments, often made by the protagonist, in a manner that was not done in Hollywood films with regards to other minority groups. Films like Cruising (1980) and Windows (1980), for example, portrayed gays in an unrelentingly negative light.

The slowly growing acceptance of homosexuality in film continued into the early 1980s, with the addition of two new factors; the rising political clout of Christian fundamentalist groups, committed to a conservative, traditionalist social and economic agenda, and the emergence of the HIV/AIDS pandemic.

=== 1980s–1990s ===
In the mid-1980s, an organized religious-political movement arose in America to oppose LGBT rights. The political clout of the "religious right", as it became known, grew as its role in helping to elect mostly Republican Party candidates and move the party further to the political right.

As a result, a Hollywood film in the mid-1980s that depicted gay people as being complex human beings entitled to their rights and dignity was deemed a potential commercial liability and was at risk of a boycott from the stronghold conservative, right wing movement. Throughout the 1980s, if a Hollywood film was not made primarily for a gay audience or a cosmopolitan–liberal audience, homosexuality was often depicted as something to laugh at, pity or fear.

Along with the clout of fundamentalist Christian groups, Hollywood's treatment of homosexuality and gay characters was also shaped by the emergence of the HIV/AIDS pandemic. Ignorance about the disease, and how it was spread, was commonplace and the fact that many of the early American victims were gay or bisexual men helped to fuel the myth that gave the disease its first name; GRID (Gay Related Immune Disorder).

As mainstream American films began to depict or make reference to the pandemic, the ignorance about the disease, including the idea that if one is gay, then they must have AIDS, spread. The first American film about the pandemic, and the ignorance and homophobia that it promoted, was an independent film, Parting Glances (1986). It was followed by a mainstream television movie, An Early Frost (1985), but the first mainstream Hollywood film about the pandemic, and its impact on the gay community, would be released at the end of the decade; Longtime Companion (1989), followed up by Philadelphia (1993) a few years later.

All of these initial films and television movies about the pandemic followed a similar demographic pattern in that person living with AIDS was a white man from a middle-class or upper-class family, who was usually somber and emotional. Though homosexual characters and the disease were often shown in a negative light, they were also shown together as something manageable and "okay".

In the late 1980s and into the 1990s, the cultural and political backlash that had occurred against gay people and gay rights issues began to dissipate, impacting how Hollywood treated LGBT-issues. The clout of Christian fundamentalism also had its limits; in 1988, Pat Robertson, a prominent Christian fundamentalist, ran for president in the Republican Party primary and was soundly defeated. During the decade, more LGBT people came out, including celebrities and politicians and the AIDS-HIV pandemic had forced the broader society to more openly talk about human sexuality, including homosexuality.

A younger and more outspoken generation of gay people were not only coming out at younger ages, but became involved in helping to build what became known in the early-to-mid 1990s, as "LGBT Cinema".

== Modern-day film ==
New Queer Cinema of the 1990s represented a new era of independent films. Often directed and or written by openly gay people they featured mostly LGBT characters who were open about their sexual orientation or gender identity and oftentimes openly rejected both homophobia (and transphobia) as well as the idea that all LGBT characters in film needed to be "positive" or politically correct role models.

Alongside these independent films, mainstream Hollywood increasingly began to treat homosexuality as a normal part of human sexuality and gay people as a minority group entitled to dignity and respect. Overt homophobia on screen became akin to overt racism, sexism or anti-Semitism. A-list Hollywood stars were more eager to play a gay character in a film.

Initially, most of these Hollywood depictions were in the context of campy, funny characters, often in drag on some sort of adventure or farce, while teaching a lesson in tolerance, if not equality. Drag portrayals also made a comeback in many films of the 1990s, notably The Birdcage (1996), starring Robin Williams and Nathan Lane, Mrs. Doubtfire (1993), also starring Robin Williams, The Adventures of Priscilla, Queen of the Desert (1994), starring Guy Pearce, and To Wong Foo, Thanks for Everything! Julie Newmar (1995), starring Patrick Swayze, Wesley Snipes, and John Leguizamo.

While likable, decent gay characters were more common in mainstream Hollywood films, same-sex relationships, public displays of affection and intimacy were still generally taboo in mainstream Hollywood films. In the 1990s, the protagonist, or his best friend, in a Hollywood film could be LGBT, and a decent person, but, compared to heterosexual characters in films, the price of this progress was little to no on-screen same-sex intimacy or sexuality.

Gaston and LeFou in the 1991 film Beauty and the Beast and Jafar from the 1992 film Aladdin were created by a gay animator named Andreas Deja, and sang music by Howard Ashman, who was also gay. The fact that Deja had also worked on Scar in The Lion King and the titular character in Hercules, for example, has been discussed as an influence on the development of some Disney characters. This queer coding, however, had its disadvantages, with networks not wanting to show overt representation. Rebecca Sugar argued that it is "really heavy" for a kid to only exist "as a villain or a joke" in an animated series. In 2011, Deja told news.com.au Disney would have a "family that has two dads or two mums" if they find the "right kind of story with that kind of concept." However, other critics criticized such queer-coded villains as contributing to "homophobic discourse" and equating queerness with evil itself. In 1995, the British animated short film Achilles depicted Achilles and Patroclus in a same-sex relationship. The film was a landmark in gay representation in animation.

Outside of independent films or films made primarily for a gay audience, this trend did not really change in America until Ang Lee's Brokeback Mountain (2005), which was a major benchmark in modern gay cinema. It was one of the first major motion pictures to feature a love story with two leading homosexual roles. The film provided a new mainstream outlook of homosexuality on film and in society and drew large critical acclaim, earning 8 nominations and taking home the awards for Directing, Music, and Writing (Adapted Screenplay). Other films such as Monster (2003), Milk (2008) and Carol (2015) all feature famous actors and actresses portraying homosexual characters searching for love and happiness in oppressive societies.

On June 13, 2014, How to Train Your Dragon 2 was released in U.S. theaters. In the film, the voice actor for Gobber the Belch, Craig Ferguson ad-libbed a line in the second film in which he mentions that he never got married for an undisclosed reason. Ferguson and director Dean DeBlois have confirmed that this was in reference to the character's homosexuality. His sexuality was also hinted at again in the third film, in 2019, where he seems to fall for Eret. On March 4, 2016, Zootopia, an animated buddy cop film, was released in the United States. In the film, Bucky Oryx-Antlerson and Pronk Oryx-Antlerson are an anthropomorphic kudu and oryx, respectively, who are loud and argumentative neighbors to main protagonist Judy Hopps. Given their differing species and sharing a hyphenated surname, viewers and fans speculated the pair were a married same-sex couple. This was later confirmed by co-director Jared Bush. In July 2017, In a Heartbeat, an animated short film produced by Ringling College of Art and Design and funded through Kickstarter, was released. The short film concerns a closeted gay boy, Sherwin who has a crush on another boy named Jonathan and his heart desires to be with him.

On May 22, 2020, an animated short film titled Out premiered on Disney+. This short Pixar film revolves around Greg attempting to hide a framed photo of him and his boyfriend, Manuel, from his parents, out of fear for their disapproval. The seventh short film in the SparkShorts series, it is both Disney's and Pixar's first short to feature a gay main character and storyline, including an on-screen same-sex kiss. In June 2021, Luca was released on Disney+. Some argued that the film felt "gay" even if not "explicitly queer," and more ambiguous, comparing it to the 2020 animated film, Wolfwalkers. Strange World which was released on November 23, 2022, features Ethan Clade, who is the first gay lead character in a Disney animated film. Ethan Clade is voiced by gay comedian Jaboukie Young-White.

Gay romance films also began to become more mainstream in the 21st century due to the growing success of movies featuring gay characters. Films such as But I'm a Cheerleader (1999), Love, Simon (2018), and others continued the rising amount of movies tackling themes of homosexuality within the romance and comedy genres, with the romantic comedy film Bros released in 2022 as the first gay romantic comedy film made by a major film studio. This also would include the 2016 film Moonlight, which would go on to win the Academy Award for Best Picture, being among the only gay themed movies to win the award.
