= Jane Cumming =

Witness in a libel suit (1795/6 – 1844)

- Born: 1795/6; Patna, India
- Died: 24 April 1844; Dallas, Moray
- Known for: Witness in libel suit

Jane Cumming m. Tulloch (1795/6 – 24 April 1844) was a witness in a libel suit made famous in the Lillian Hellman play, The Children's Hour.

== Biography ==
Jane Cumming was the daughter of George Cumming, a writer working for the East India Company, and an unknown Indian mother. She also had a brother named Yorrick. George Cumming had travelled to India, aged eighteen years old, to work for the company as his father and uncles had done before him. He was the eldest son of Lieutenant Colonel Alexander Penrose Cumming, 1st Baronet of Gordonstoun and Altyre.

Alexander Cumming's friendship with Henry Dundas, President of the Board of Control for India Affairs, had afforded his son George an advantageous position in Patna, India, with the expectation that George would go on to achieve great things. However, George passed away before he reached his twenty-seventh birthday.

Jane was born at either the end of 1795 or the beginning of 1796 and was given the last name Cumming at the insistence of her Indian grandfather. George continued to court her mother and promised to restore her honour and provide for the baby.

When Jane turned four years old, George informed his mother, Lady Helen Cumming Gordon, of Jane's existence. After her father's death, Jane was sent first to a Christian boarding school in Kolkata, where she and her brother were the only eurasian children, and then to another school of both Indian and European pupils. In 1802 Jane was sent to live in Scotland at the Gordonstoun estate, after Lady Cumming Gordon's husband, Alexander Cumming Gordon, became seriously ill. At first, Jane trained to become a milliner. Lady Cumming Gordon moved to Edinburgh in 1807 after her husband's death, and did not see Jane for two years until she, following a dream about Jane, sent for her and legitimised her as "a daughter of the family". This was provided she enroll and succeed at a new school for ladies, run by teachers Marianne Woods and Jane Pirie.

Jane married William Tulloch, a schoolmaster, in 1818. At the time of her marriage, her grandmother had settled 700 pounds on her. Jane and William had three children, George Cumming, Charles Lennox and Eliza Maria Campbell, named for Jane's father, uncle and aunt, and two other children who died in infancy; William Gordon and Helen Grant Cumming Tulloch, named for Jane's grandmother.

== The libel suit ==
Jane Cumming attended the Edinburgh boarding school run by Marianne Woods and Jane Pirie. On Saturday 10 November 1810, Cumming went to her grandmother's home at 22 Charlotte Square, and told her the teachers were sexually intimate and had been woken frequently by Woods joining Pirie in the bed shared by her, Pirie, and Cumming. Jane was the first pupil to be removed from the school, although all the others left within days.

In 1811, Woods and Pirie sued Jane's grandmother, Lady Helen Cumming Gordon for libel. Jane gave testimony in the case, claiming she was frequently woken at night to find Woods visiting Pirie's bed. Nine years later the case reached the House of Lords, where they ruled in favour of Woods and Pirie, as the accusations were 'not proven'. Jane Cumming's testimony was ascribed to the racially biased argument that her Indian upbringing had exposed her to sexual knowledge and deviancy.

The story of the court case was the inspiration for Lillian Hellman's 1934 play The Children's Hour and a later film version The Children's Hour in 1961, directed by William Wyler, which set the story in the United States and starred Audrey Hepburn, Shirley MacLaine and James Garner as well as These Three in 1936 which starred Miriam Hopkins, Merle Oberon and Joel McCrea.
