= Fernando Carrere =

Mexican art director

- Born: 31 December 1910; Mexico
- Died: 2 September 1998 (aged 87); Los Angeles, California
- Occupation: Art director
- Years active: 1947–1980

Fernando Carrere (31 December 1910 – 2 September 1998) was a Mexican art director. He was nominated for an Academy Award in the category Best Art Direction for the film The Children's Hour.

== Selected filmography ==
- The Children's Hour (1961)
- The Great Escape (1963)
- The Pink Panther (1963)
- The Party (1968)
