= Kilbarchan =

Coordinates: 55.8362°N 4.5537°W

Kilbarchan: Scottish Gaelic: Cill Bhearchain
- Location within Renfrewshire
- Population: 3,300 (2020)
- OS grid reference: NS401633
- Council area: Renfrewshire
- Lieutenancy area: Renfrewshire
- Country: Scotland
- Sovereign state: United Kingdom
- Post town: Johnstone
- Postcode district: PA10
- Dialling code: 01505
- Police: Scotland
- Fire: Scottish
- Ambulance: Scottish
- UK Parliament: Paisley and Renfrewshire South
- Scottish Parliament: Renfrewshire South

Kilbarchan (/kɪlˈbɑːrxən/; Scottish Gaelic: Cill Bhearchain) is a village and civil parish in central Renfrewshire, in the west central Lowlands of Scotland. It is almost contiguous with Johnstone, about 5 miles or 8 km west of the centre of Paisley. The village's name means "cell (chapel) of St. Barchan". It is known for its former weaving industry.

A preserved weaver's cottage from 1723 can be visited. It is run by the National Trust for Scotland

The garden contains botanical specimens which would have used to make natural dyes for the weaver's use.

These include madder and woad.

== History ==
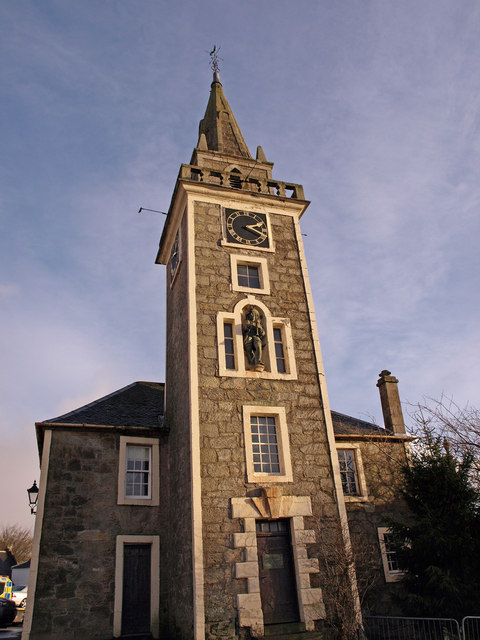
The Steeple (1755) – a statue of Habbie Simpson is visible.

Kilbarchan was the birthplace of Mary Barbour, who led Glasgow's rent strike of 1915 and later became Glasgow Corporation's first woman councillor.

Kilbarchan was used as a location for the BBC TV show Dr. Finlay's Casebook in the 1960s.

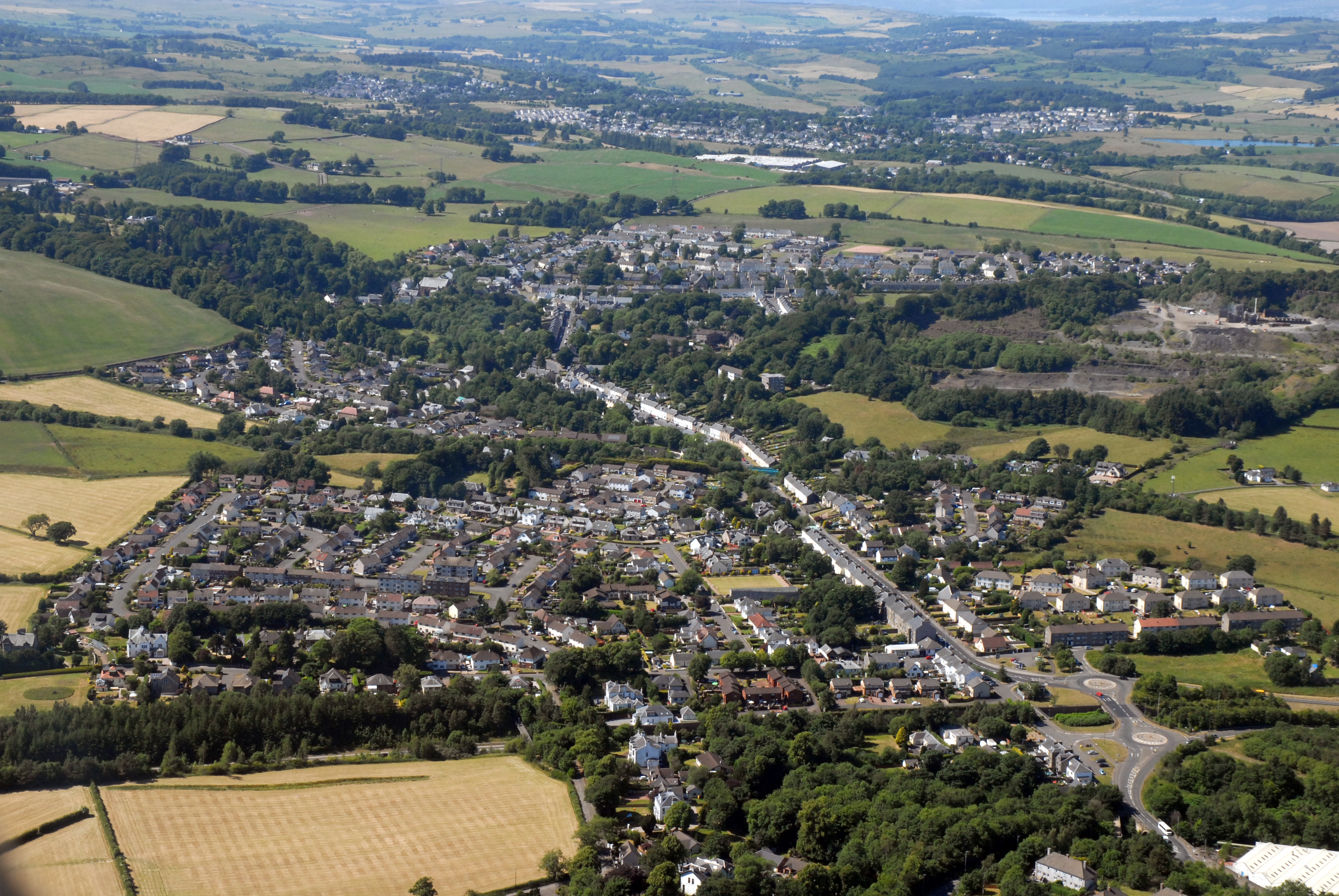
Kilbarchan

== Transport ==
Kilbarchan railway station opened on 1 June 1905, and closed to passengers on 27 June 1966.

== Notable people ==
- Mary Nicol Neill Armour (1902–2000), artist
- Mary Barbour, political activist, was born here
- Campbell Douglas, architect, was born and raised here
- Maud Galt (c. 1620 – c. 1670), lesbian accused of witchcraft, lived here with her husband
- Prof Thomas Gibson FRSE, professor of plastic surgery and bioengineering, born here
- Agnes Lyle, a ballad singer, lived here in 1825
- Hugh McIver, recipient of the Victoria Cross
- John Stirling (1654–1727), Principal of Glasgow University and Moderator of the General Assembly in 1707
