= Marthe Hanau =

French fraudster

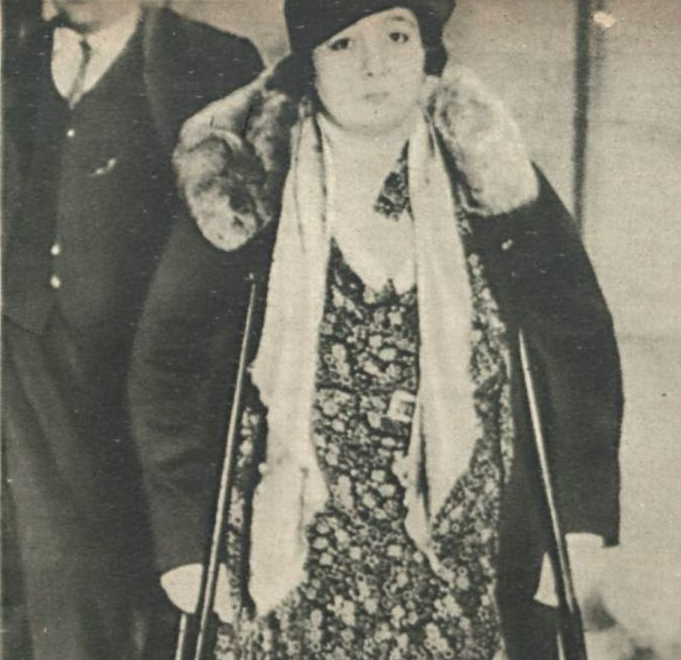
- Marthe Hanau in 1935.
- Born: 1 January 1886; Lille, France
- Died: 19 July 1935 (aged 49); Fresnes Prison, Fresnes, Val-de-Marne, France
- Spouse: Lazare Bloch (m. 1908, divorced)

Marthe Marie Hanau (1 January 1886 – 19 July 1935) was a Frenchwoman who successfully defrauded French financial markets in the 1920s and the 1930s.

== Early life ==
Marthe Marie Hanau was born in Lille to the family of a Jewish industrialist.

She married Lazare Bloch in 1908; they later divorced. In 1925, she and Bloch, who remained business partners after their divorce, founded an economic newspaper, La Gazette du Franc et des Nations. Hanau used the newspaper to dispense stock tips to financial speculators.

== Fraud ==
Hanau's paper promoted mainly the stocks and securities of her own business partners, whose businesses were mere shells or paper companies. Still, the value of their stock kept rising when stockbrokers bought and traded them. Hanau expanded her investing advice network and later formed her own financial news agency, Agence Interpresse. She even released short-term bonds that promised 8% interest.

French banks and Agence Havas, the rival financial news agency, turned against her. Banks began to investigate the nonexistent companies and soon were numerous rumours about Hanau's shady business practices. At first, Hanau managed to quell the rumours by bribing cooperative politicians.

However, when charges continued to swirl around her, police arrested Hanau, Bloch, and many of their business partners on 17 December 1928. They were charged with fraud and confined in Saint-Lazare Prison. By then, her investors had lost approximately 120,000,000 contemporary French francs.

The preliminary trial began 15 months later. Hanau protested that the court did not understand financial business, could return all the money, and should be released on bail. When court denied the bail, she went on a hunger strike.

Three weeks later, Hanau was moved to Cochin Hospital in Paris, where she was forcibly fed. When she was left alone, she made a rope out of bedsheets, climbed out of the window, and returned to Saint-Lazare Prison. Paris Police Prefect Jean Chiappe from Corsica was afraid that she would die in his hands and requested for her to be released on bail. She was moved to a hospice, where she still announced that she would return all of the money, but not everybody believed her.

Her trial began in earnest on 20 February 1932. During the trial, Hanau revealed the names of all the politicians that she had bribed and caused a scandal. Hanau received two years in prison, but the court credited her with the 15 months that she had already spent in prison. Bloch received 18 months, and the other partners were released with fines.

When Hanau was released later that year, she bought the Forces magazine. In April 1932, she published an article about the shady side of the financial markets and quoted a Sûreté file about herself. Police arrested her, but she refused to reveal who had leaked the file except that it had been taken from Finance Minister Pierre-Étienne Flandin. She was sentenced to three months in prison for receiving stolen documents, and contempt of court after she declared in court that "justice is rotten". She appealed, but after the appeal was rejected, she fled. She was soon arrested and returned to prison.

== Death ==
Hanau committed suicide on 19 July 1935 by taking an overdose of sleeping pills. She died in Fresnes Prison a few days before the end of her prison term.

== Legacy ==
A French movie, "La Banquière" (The Lady Banker), by Francis Girod, was made in 1980, starring Romy Schneider as "Emma Eckhert", a thinly-fictionalized Hanau.

Season 7, Episode 7 of the Bad Gays podcast covers her life and crimes.

== See also ==
- 6 February 1934 crisis

== Sources ==
- Janet Flanner, "The Swindling Presidente," The New Yorker, 26 August & 2 September 1939.
