= Agnes Lyle =

British ballad singer

- Born: 1700s
- Died: 1800s
- Known for: singing ballads

Agnes Lyle or Agnes Lile (1700s – 1800s) was a British ballad singer who lived in Kilbarchan in Renfrewshire. Her songs which she had learnt from her father were transcribed by William Motherwell and published by Francis James Child.

== Life ==
Lyle was born to a weaver who lived from about 1731 to about 1811. His name is unknown and Lyle's birth date is only estimated to be about 1775. She is only known because in 1825 she met William Motherwell several times. Motherwell was gathering ballads and he met several Scottish women but Lyle was his best source. She supplied 22 songs and in some cases she gave him the tune and the words. Lyle's neighbours in Kilbarchan supplied other songs. She told Motherwell that she had obtained the songs she sang him from her father.

She sang songs of love triangles and patriotic songs but she was said to be cynical about their themes. However when she sang the lyrics of Sheath and Knife she was moved to tears. The song involves the incestual relationship of a brother and sister. The song was later recorded by Maddy Prior.

== Legacy ==
Her songs came to wider notice when Motherwell's gatherings were included in Harvard Professor Francis James Child's publication, English and Scottish Popular Ballads, 1882–98.

In 1978 her ballads were republished by Indiana University.
