= Mimi Gibson =

American actress

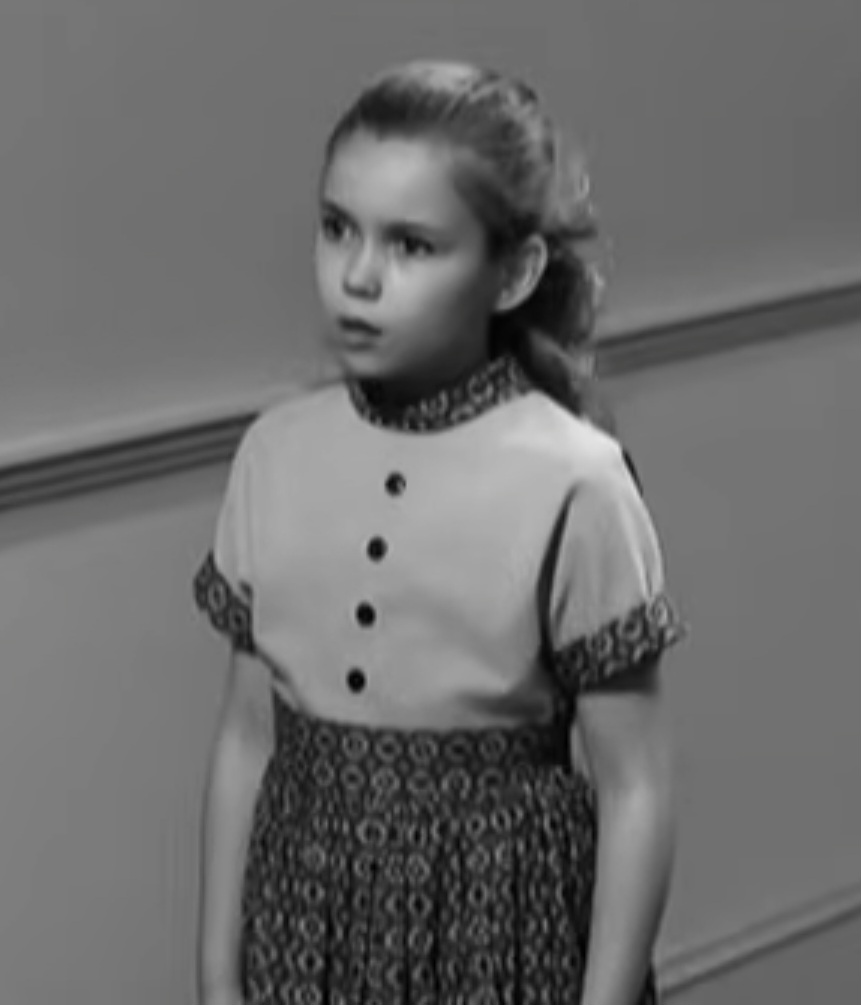
- Gibson in an episode of One Step Beyond (1959)
- Occupations: Actress, real estate agent
- Years active: 1951–1968
- Spouse(s): Joseph Schoenbaum (m. 1969; div. 1977); John Bardet (m. 1978; div. 19??); Carl Rahal (m. 1980; died 2009)

Mimi Gibson is an American real estate agent and a former child actress, from 1951 to 1968.

== Early life ==
After the early death of her father due to a congenital heart condition, her mother, Agnes Gibson, took Mimi and her sister to Los Angeles.

She started her career as a calendar girl, appearing in postcards and advertisements before turning to movies and TV shows.

She had an agent before she was 3 years old, and soon thereafter she began appearing in films. Her income supported the three of them.

In 1951, Gibson was designated Miss Glamour in Miniature during ceremonies in Sun Valley.

== Career ==
During the 1950s and early 1960s, Gibson appeared in 34 films and approximately 200 television episodes. Her film debut came in I'll See You in My Dreams (1951).

Her last TV roles came as a teenage girlfriend in episodes of My Three Sons in the late 1960s. In 1957, she and child actress Evelyn Rudie played the daughters of John Wayne and Maureen O'Hara in The Wings of Eagles. Although they had some significant scenes, she and Rudie were not credited. The same year she was in the horror B movie The Monster That Challenged the World.

In 1958, Gibson portrayed Cary Grant's daughter — with Paul Petersen and Charles Herbert playing her brothers — in the romantic comedy Houseboat, which also starred Sophia Loren. Gibson said, "I'd like to be remembered for Houseboat. Houseboat was fun, wonderful and I loved it". After the film was completed, Loren gave Gibson a pendant with a houseboat on one side and "To Mimi from Sophia" on the other. Grant gave each of the children a $50 savings bond.

In 1961, Gibson appeared in The Children's Hour, based on the play by Lillian Hellman. Gibson played a schoolgirl at a small private school run by two friends (portrayed by Audrey Hepburn and Shirley MacLaine) who were falsely accused of being in a lesbian relationship which was somewhat risque for its time. Gibson said Hepburn was very nice to the girls, but that "Shirley MacLaine despised kids" and would not speak to them. That same year, in One Hundred and One Dalmatians, Gibson voiced the puppy named Lucky, alongside Mickey Maga, Barbara Beaird, Sandra Abbott, and several other children. Gibson became known for this film for her line, "I'm tired and I'm hungry and my tail's froze...and my nose is froze and my ears are froze. And my toes are froze."

On television, Gibson appeared in five Playhouse 90 dramas and many episodes of The Red Skelton Show, as well as some episodes of Whirlybirds, and Leave it to Beaver.

By age 19, Gibson, along with other acting friends, found it difficult to get roles due to overexposure, and the casting directors were looking for "new faces".

== Personal life ==
In 1999, she testified before a California legislative panel on the need for statutory protection for child actors' earnings. Actor Paul Petersen, who played her older brother in Houseboat, also testified. Petersen remained a lifelong friend and in 1990 founded A Minor Consideration, a nonprofit group devoted to protecting and advancing the interests of child actors. Gibson has also been active in this group. Her autobiography Working Kid was released on June 20, 2021.

When she was 20 years old, Gibson got married "to get away from my mom" due to her being very controlling, but they reconciled later. Gibson went on to make a career in real estate.

Gibson was married to Joseph Schoenbaum, John Bardet, and Carl Rahal. The latter marriage lasted until his death on November 21, 2009.

== Filmography ==
- Corky of Gasoline Alley (1951) - Clovia (uncredited)
- I'll See You in My Dreams (1951) - Irene (age 3)
- Everything I Have Is Yours (1952) - Pamela (age 3)
- My Pal Gus (1952) - Judy (uncredited)
- A Slight Case of Larceny (1953) - Mary Ellen Clopp
- Sweethearts on Parade (1953) - Lou (uncredited)
- Torch Song (1953) - Susie (scenes deleted)
- The Egyptian (1954) - Princess (uncredited)
- There's No Business Like Show Business (1954) - Katy Donahue (age 4) (uncredited)
- Alfred Hitchcock Presents (1955) (Season 1 Episode 12: "Santa Claus and the Tenth Avenue Kid") as First Girl in line to see Santa
- Prince of Players (1955) - Little Girl (uncredited)
- The Eternal Sea (1955) - Mary Sue Hoskins (uncredited)
- Lay That Rifle Down (1955) - Terry Fetcher (uncredited)
- At Gunpoint (1955) - Cynthia Clark (uncredited)
- The Bottom of the Bottle (1956) - Jeanie Martin - Donald's Daughter
- World Without End (1956) - Ginny Jaffe (uncredited)
- Three for Jamie Dawn (1956) - Cindy Lorenz (uncredited)
- Rebel in Town (1956) - Lisbeth Anstadt
- Strange Intruder (1956) - Libby Carmichael
- The Ten Commandments (1956) - Egyptian Girl - The Blind One's Granddaughter
- Drango (1957) - Ellen Bryant
- The Wings of Eagles (1957) - Lila Wead (uncredited)
- Official Detective (1957) TV series episode 'The Creeper'- Barbara
- The Oklahoman (1957) - Louise Brighton
- The Monster That Challenged the World (1957) - Sandy MacKenzie
- Courage of Black Beauty (1957) - Lily Rowden
- The Brothers Rico (1957) - Mary Felici, Little Girl (uncredited)
- The Three Faces of Eve (1957) - Eve (younger)
- No Down Payment (1957) - Sandra Kreitzer (uncredited)
- Houseboat (1958) - Elizabeth Winters
- The Buccaneer (1958) - Marjorie
- The Remarkable Mr. Pennypacker (1959) - Elizabeth Pennypacker (uncredited)
- Alcoa Presents: One Step Beyond (1959) - TV series episode The Dead Part of the House
- I'll Give My Life (1960) - Jodie Bradford
- One Hundred and One Dalmatians (1961) - Lucky (voice) (age 11)
- The Children's Hour (1961) - Evelyn
- If He Hollers Let Him Go (1968) - Marion

== Bibliography ==
- Parla, Paul; Charles P. Mitchell (2000). "Mimi Gibson: Unleashing the Monster That Challenged the World". Screen Sirens Scream! Interviews with 20 Actresses from Science Fiction, Horror, Film Noir and Mystery Movies, 1930s to 1960s. Jefferson, N.C. and London: McFarland. pp. 105–114. ISBN 0-7864-0701-8.
