= Tracey Wigginton =

Australian murderer

Tracey Avril Wigginton
- Born: August 1965 (age 61); Australia
- Other name: Lesbian Vampire Killer
- Status: Paroled
- Conviction: Murder
- Criminal charge: Murder
- Penalty: Life imprisonment

Tracey Avril Wigginton (born 4 August 1965), known as the "Lesbian Vampire Killer", is an Australian murderer who achieved notoriety for killing Edward Baldock in 1989, supposedly to drink his blood. This was described as "one of the most brutal and bizarre crimes Australia has ever seen." Wigginton was sentenced to life imprisonment in 1991, and was paroled in 2012.

== Early life ==
Wigginton grew up in the northern Australian city of Rockhampton. She was adopted at the age of three by her wealthy maternal grandparents, George and Avril Wigginton, after her mother could no longer care for her following a divorce. Wigginton claims that her grandparents were controlling, and had physically and sexually abused her.

In 1981, Wigginton's grandparents died and left 15 year-old Wigginton $75,000 ($310,640 in 2022 dollars). Wigginton briefly moved back in with her mother, who was not accepting of her lesbianism, and then moved in with a family friend who described her as "a loving girl, gifted artist and devout Catholic."

Following a miscarriage, Wigginton stopped attending Mass, and started communicating with a white witch in Adelaide. Following a move to Brisbane, Wigginton began to immerse herself in the occult: keeping black magic items on her person, and using blood from animals to draw occult symbols.

== Murder ==
Wigginton, who allegedly killed and drank the blood of animals, had been planning for some time to escalate to murdering a man so that she could "feed" on him. On the night of the murder, Wigginton (then aged 24), Lisa Ptaschinski (aged 24), Kim Jervis (aged 23) and Tracy Waugh (aged 23) had been out drinking and then drove around in Wigginton's Holden Commodore in search of a victim. At the time, Wigginton stood 183 cm (6 feet) tall and weighed 95 kg (209 pounds).

Edward Baldock (47), a council worker and father of four, was waiting for a taxi after drinking heavily and playing darts with friends. Jervis persuaded him to get into their car and they drove him to a park on the banks of the Brisbane River. It is disputed whether Wigginton got Baldock in the car by offering him a lift or by pretending to be a sex worker. There, he undressed while Wigginton returned to the car to retrieve a knife. She then stabbed him 27 times, nearly severing his head before drinking his blood.

When police arrived at the scene, they located Wigginton's bank card in one of Baldock's shoes among his neatly folded pile of clothes. The four women were then quickly arrested. A few days after the murder, Wigginton told police that she ‘felt nothing’ while stabbing Baldock and that she sat down to smoke a cigarette while she watched him die.

== Trial ==
Wigginton was the only one of the four co-accused who pleaded guilty to the charge of murder. Therefore, there was no trial for her and few details were disclosed to the court as to why this incident occurred by Wigginton; Ptaschinski, Jervis, and Waugh stated that Wigginton had claimed to have vampiric tendencies. They said that the reason for the murder was to enable the drinking of the man's blood. During the trial, Wigginton said to the media "‘It's hard to be famous, isn't it? A legend in my own mind’."

In 1991, Wigginton was sentenced to life imprisonment by the Supreme Court of Queensland with a minimum of 13 years. Ptaschinski was also convicted of murder, and Jervis of manslaughter. Waugh was acquitted.

== Aftermath ==
In 2006, Wigginton assaulted a fellow inmate and a prison guard.

The case still commands strong media interest and public reaction. In April 2008, it was reported that Wigginton was being released. However, it was actually Ptaschinski who was being released under the resettlement leave program, given a maximum of 12 hours leave every two months for six months.

Wigginton made four unsuccessful parole applications until 2011 when the parole board granted her application. Wigginton was released from prison on 11 January 2012 despite lying to the parole board.

In 2021, interest in Wigginton was revived when it was revealed that she was posting images on Facebook of vampires, witches, and a pile of skull and bones. Following this, the officers who investigated the case said that Wigginton's parole should be revoked.
