= Jane Pirie =

Scottish educator (1779–1833)

- Born: 27 March 1779
- Died: 6 March 1833 (aged 53)
- Occupation: educator
- Known for: libel case taken with Marianne Woods, school co-founder, after being accused of same-sex relations. The case against Lady Helen Cumming Gordon grandmother of one of the pupils Jane Cumming was won on appeal to the House of Lords, with original claims not proven

Jane Pirie (27 March 1779 – 6 March 1833) was a Scottish woman who opened an exclusive girls' school in Drumsheugh Gardens, Edinburgh in 1809 and who became involved in a libel court case about lesbian sex, which was found 'not proven'.

This was a result of being accused of displays of "inordinate affection" with the co-founder of the school, Marianne Woods (1781–1870). Her accuser was Jane Cumming, a pupil and a granddaughter of Lady Helen Cumming Gordon, who alleged that the two women "engaged in irregular sexual practices" and "lewd and indecent behavior."

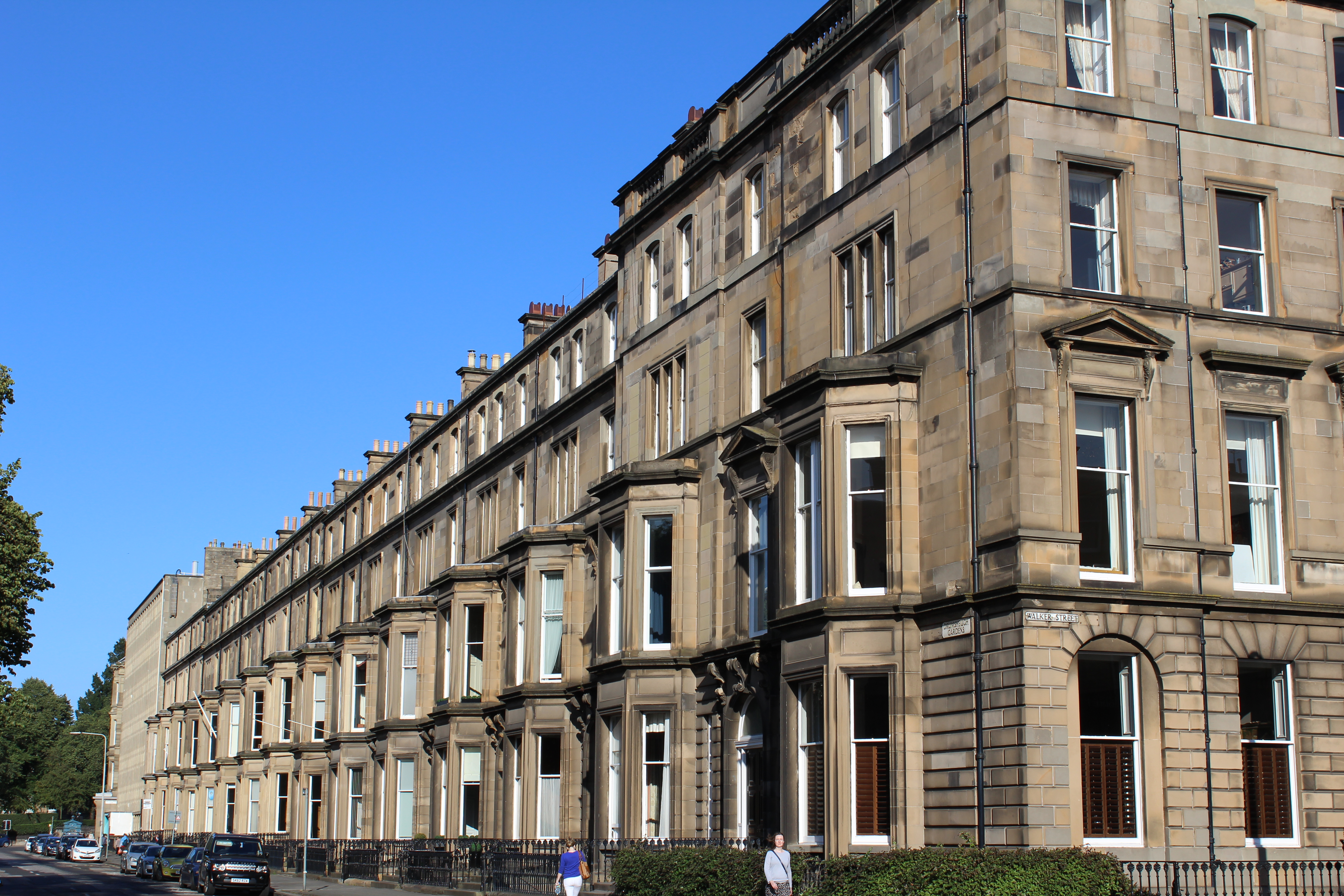
Drumsheugh Gardens, Edinburgh (site of the girls' boarding school)

Lady Cumming Gordon spread rumours of these allegations. Jane Cumming was the first pupil to leave the school, and within days, all the other pupils had left as well. This risked financial as well as reputational damage for Pirie and Woods.

Jane Pirie and Marianne Woods denied the allegations and sued Lady Cumming Gordon for £10,000. Despite the teachers winning the case, which was held in secret, in 1812, it was appealed by Lady Cumming Gordon, to the House of Lords, which ultimately dismissed the appeal.

The court cases heard details from pupils statements of the alleged sexual behaviour but the Law Lords disagreed with each other on the reliability of this evidence, given that alternative 'facts' about bed sharing, which was common between women at the time, had been stated by the complainants (Pirie and Woods). Lord Meadowbank stated (in what would now be considered racism), that it was 'notarious' that British children could be adversely influenced by lewd gossip of Indian servants. He also stated that lesbian sex would be "equally imaginary with witchcraft, sorcery, or carnal copulation with the devil".

In the end, bringing this case financially ruined the school teachers, who received little more than £1,000 after paying significantly high legal costs. Although Marianne Woods obtained part-time employment as a teacher in London, Jane Pirie stayed in Edinburgh and was unable to find employment, and "possibly had a nervous breakdown."

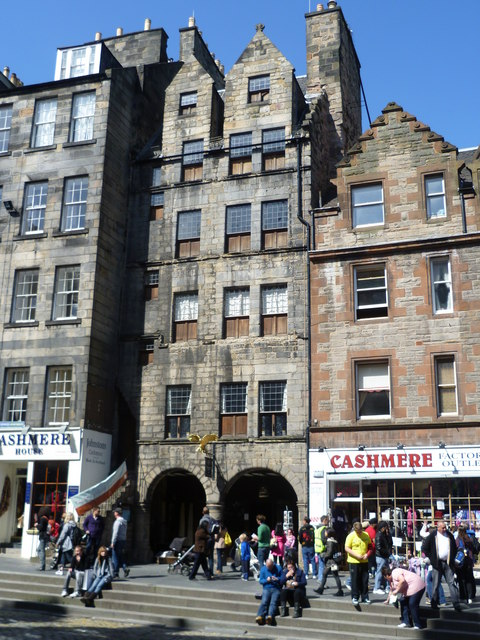
Gladstone's Land, where Pirie lived

Pirie, who was living in Gladstone's Land, during this period, later took her sister to court over the division of their parent's property, eventually moved to live with her sister in Glasgow, where she died, aged 54 in 1833.

== In popular culture ==
As well as being considered as a landmark case in legal circles, the story of the court case was the inspiration for Lillian Hellman's 1934 play The Children's Hour. Two Hollywood films were inspired by this story: These Three in 1936 which starred Miriam Hopkins, Merle Oberon and Joel McCrea, and The Children's Hour in 1961, both directed by William Wyler, which set the story in the United States and starred Audrey Hepburn, Shirley MacLaine and James Garner Several decades later, a new international cinema production directed by Sophie Heldman, The Education of Jane Cumming, was shot in the original setting of Scotland, and premiered at the Berlinale Film Festival 2026.

== See also ==
- The Children's Hour (1934 play)
- These Three (1936 film)
- The Children's Hour (1961 film)
- The Education of Jane Cumming (2026 film)
