= The Children's Hour (play) =

1934 play by Lillian Hellman

- First edition 1934
- Original language: English
- Written by: Lillian Hellman
- Characters: Evelyn Munn; Mrs Lily Mortar; Peggy Rogers; Helen Burton; Lois Fisher; Catherine; Rosalie Wells; Mary Tilford; Karen Wright; Martha Dobie; Doctor Joseph Cardin; Agatha; Mrs Amelia Tilford; A Grocery Boy
- Subject: A child's lies destroy the lives of two women at a boarding school for girls
- Genre: Drama

Premiere
- Date: November 20, 1934
- Place: Maxine Elliott Theatre, New York City

The Children's Hour is a 1934 American play by Lillian Hellman. It is a drama set in an all-girls boarding school run by two women, Karen Wright and Martha Dobie. An angry student, Mary Tilford, runs away from the school and, to avoid being sent back, tells her grandmother that the two headmistresses are having a lesbian affair. The accusation proceeds to destroy the women's careers, relationships, and lives.

The play was first staged on Broadway at the Maxine Elliott Theatre in 1934, produced and directed by Herman Shumlin. In 1936, it was presented in Paris and at London's Gate Theatre Studio.

== Synopsis ==
Two women, Karen Wright and Martha Dobie, have worked hard to build a girls' boarding school in a refurbished farmhouse. They run and teach at the school with the somewhat unwelcome help of Lily Mortar, Martha's aunt. One pupil, Mary Tilford, is mischievous, disobedient, and untruthful, and often leads the other girls into trouble. One day, Mary feigns illness and is being examined by Dr. Joe Cardin, a physician who is Mary's cousin and also Karen's fiancé. Martha asks Lily whether she would like to go back to traveling to the places she misses, now that they can afford it. Lily becomes angry and starts shouting about how, whenever Joe is around, Martha becomes irritable, unreasonable, and jealous, taking her jealousy of Joe out on her. Two of Mary's schoolmates, Peggy Rogers and Evelyn Munn, who were listening at the door trying to discover Mary's condition, overhear Lily's outburst.

Mary is found healthy and is sent to her room. She squeezes the information out of Peggy and Evelyn. Mary plans to ask her indulgent grandmother, Amelia Tilford – who also helped Karen and Martha in setting up the school and enrolling pupils – to allow her not to return. When Amelia refuses, Mary cleverly twists what the girls have overheard. With the help of several well-crafted lies and a book that the girls have been reading in secret, Mary convinces her grandmother that Karen and Martha are having a lesbian affair. On hearing this, Amelia Tilford begins contacting the parents of Mary's classmates. Shortly afterwards, most of Mary's schoolmates have been pulled out of school. Rosalie Wells, a student whose mother is abroad, stays with Mary.

Seeing that Rosalie is vulnerable, Mary blackmails her into corroborating everything she says. When Karen and Martha realize why all their pupils were pulled out of their school in a single night, they go to Mrs. Tilford's residence to confront her. Amelia tells Mary to repeat her story. When Karen points out an inconsistency, Mary pretends to have been covering for Rosalie, who reluctantly corroborates Mary's story for fear of being exposed herself. Resolving to take Amelia to court, Martha and Karen leave.

Seven months later, after Martha and Karen have lost the case, everyone still believes the allegation that they were lovers. When Lily returns from abroad, the women are angry with her for not being available to testify to their innocence. Meanwhile, Joe, who has remained loyal throughout, has found a job in a distant location. He tries to convince Karen and Martha to come with him and start over. As Martha goes to cook dinner, Joe continues his attempts to persuade Karen, who now believes that she has ruined his life and destroyed everything she and Martha had worked so hard to achieve.

At Karen's insistence, Joe reluctantly asks her whether she and Martha had ever been lovers. When Karen says that they were not, he readily believes her. Nevertheless, Karen decides that she and Joe must part. She says things can never be the same between them after all that they have been through. She asks Joe to leave; he refuses, but agrees to leave if Karen will think things through first. When Martha returns and learns from Karen what has happened, she is consumed with guilt. Her discovery that she might indeed have feelings for Karen overwhelms and terrifies her. Before Martha tells Karen how she feels, Karen tells Martha that she would like to relocate in the morning and wants her to come with her. Martha says it's impossible for them to live comfortably again and eventually admits her feelings for Karen. Karen responds dismissively, saying that they never felt this way for each other. Martha continues, but Karen tells Martha that she is tired and they can talk about it in the morning. As Karen sits in her room, she hears a shot. Martha has killed herself. Shortly after, Amelia Tilford arrives to beg Karen's forgiveness, since Mary's lies have now been uncovered. Karen explains to her that it is too late: Mary's lies, together with the community's willingness to believe and spread malicious gossip, have destroyed three innocent lives.

== History ==
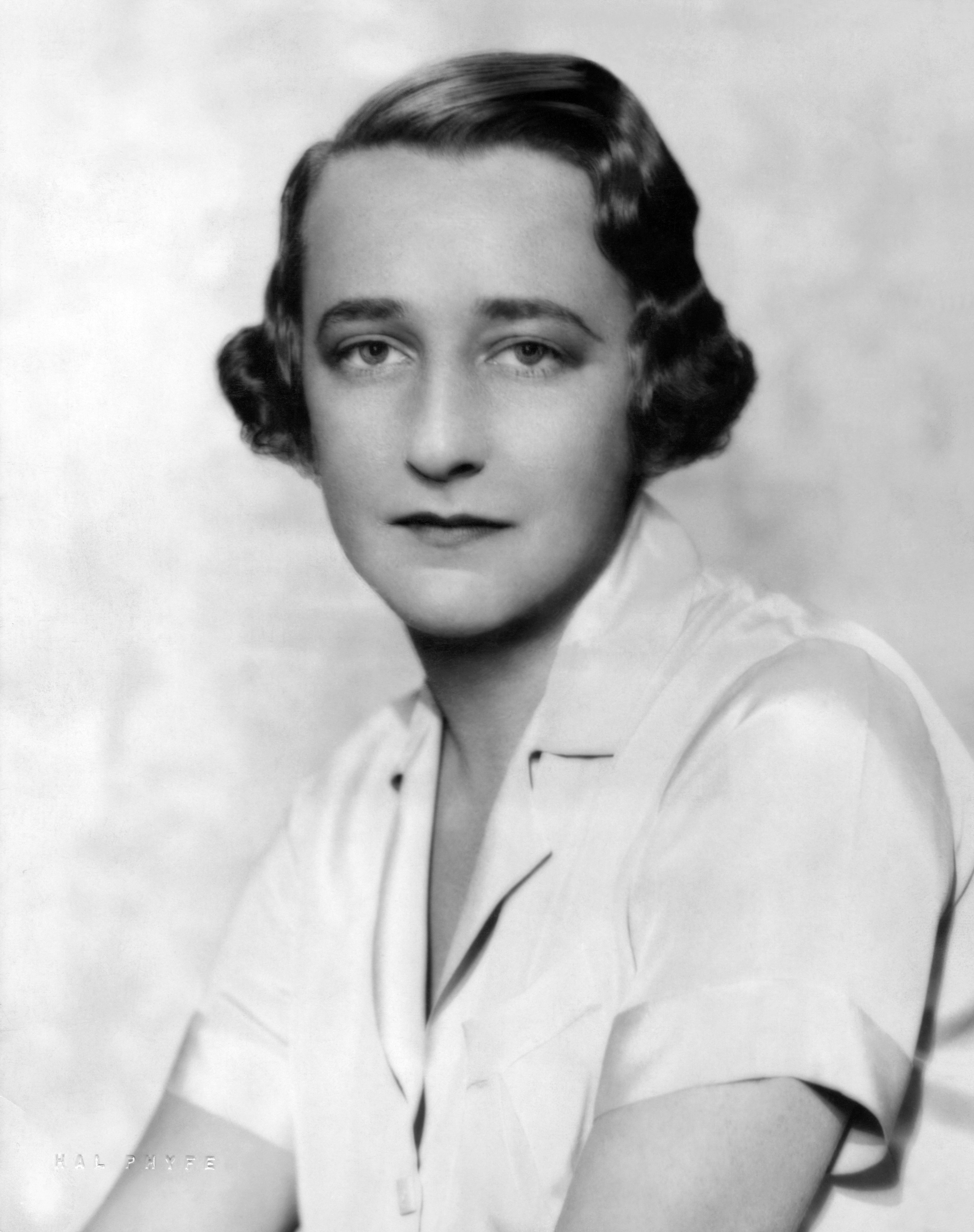
Lillian Hellman in 1935

After graduating from New York University, Hellman was a play reader in the office of theatrical producer Herman Shumlin. In May 1934, she asked Shumlin to read a play of her own—the sixth draft of The Children's Hour. He read it as she waited. After he read the first act Shumlin said, "Swell". After reading the second act he said, "I hope it keeps up". After reading the third act he said, "I'll produce it."

Shumlin and Hellman worked through the details of the production together over the next months. Shumlin felt the title of the play was misleading and wanted Hellman to change it, but Hellman loved it and refused. Hellman recalled being rudely treated by Lee Shubert, owner of the Maxine Elliott Theatre, at a rehearsal. Shumlin faced Shubert down and barked, "That girl, as you call her, is the author of the play."

Hellman had written The Children's Hour as an exercise, to teach herself how to write a play after writing one unsuccessful play with Louis Kronenberger. Believing that she would do better to find a subject based in fact, Dashiell Hammett suggested the idea for the play to Hellman after he read a book titled Bad Companions (1930), a true-crime anthology by William Roughead. It related an incident that took place in 1810 at a school in Edinburgh, Scotland. A student named Jane Cumming accused her schoolmistresses, Jane Pirie and Marianne Woods, of having an affair in the presence of their pupils. Dame Cumming Gordon, the accuser's influential grandmother, advised her friends to remove their daughters from the boarding school. Within days the school was deserted and the two women had lost their livelihood. Pirie and Woods sued and eventually won, both in court and on appeal, but given the damage done to their lives, their victory was considered hollow.

== Production ==
Produced and directed by Herman Shumlin, The Children's Hour opened November 20, 1934, at the Maxine Elliott Theatre in New York City. The settings by Aline Bernstein were executed by Sointu Syrjala. The three-act drama closed in July 1936 after 691 performances.

=== Cast ===
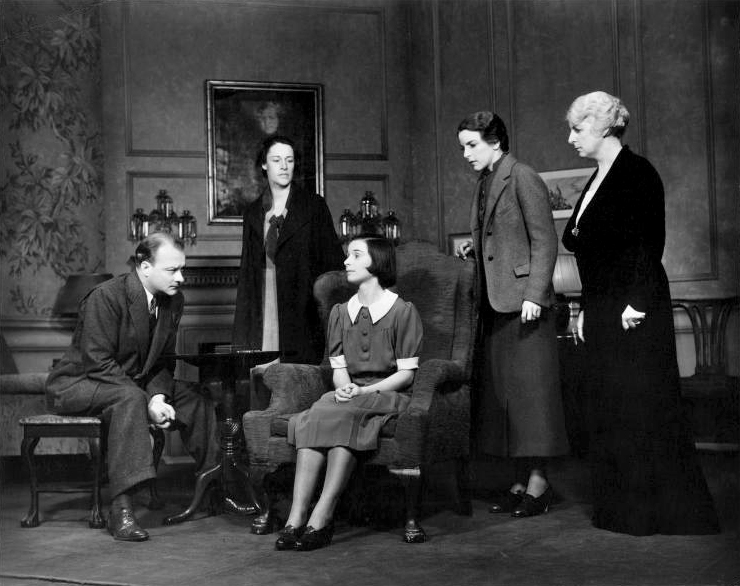
Robert Keith, Anne Revere, Florence McGee, Katherine Emery and Katherine Emmet in the original Broadway production of The Children's Hour (1934)

- Eugenia Rawls as Peggy Rogers
- Aline McDermott as Mrs. Lily Mortar
- Elizabeth Seckel as Evelyn Munn
- Lynne Fisher as Helen Burton
- Jacqueline Rusling as Lois Fisher
- Barbara Leeds as Catherine
- Barbara Beals as Rosalie Wells
- Florence McGee as Mary Tilford
- Katherine Emery as Karen Wright
- Anne Revere as Martha Dobie
- Robert Keith as Dr. Joseph Cardin
- Edmonia Nolley as Agatha
- Katherine Emmet as Mrs. Amelia Tilford
- Jack Tyler as A Grocery Boy

The financial and critical success of the New York production encouraged Shumlin to present The Children's Hour in other cities. In December 1935, authorities in Boston declared that the play did not meet the standards of the Watch and Ward Society and that it could not be performed there the following month as scheduled. Shumlin filed a $250,000 suit for damages, but in February 1936 a Federal judge refused to prevent the city from interfering in the presentation of the play. In January 1936, a municipal censorship ordinance was used to decline granting a performance permit for The Children's Hour in Chicago.

Les Innocentes, André Bernheim's French-language translation of The Children's Hour, was first presented April 21, 1936, at the Théâtre des Arts in Paris. Although the Lord Chamberlain banned the public performance of The Children's Hour in Great Britain in March 1935, the play was presented in its entirety on November 12, 1936, at a private performance at the Gate Theatre Studio in London, managed by Norman Marshall.

=== Characters ===
Philip M. Armato, an assistant professor of Northern Illinois University, argued that while members of the public perceived Karen and Martha as overall good characters, he felt they overlooked the two treating Mary Tilford and Lily Mortar without mercy, before the spreading of the rumors. He argued that when Karen forgives Amelia Tilford, this breaks a cycle of vengeance that occurs between those characters.

Tanfer Amin Tunc wrote that because Mary Tilford spread the rumor to deliberately attack the teachers, many reviewers had perceived Mary as "a corrupt and immoral child or adolescent".

== Reception ==
Screenwriter and playwright Paddy Chayefsky considered The Children's Hour to be one of the most carefully structured plays ever written, and learned play structure in his youth by copying in longhand the entire script.

Some readers and critics perceived the work as a "melodrama" with each character being a completely good one or a completely bad one, with a 1942 preface talking about "goodness" and "badness" used as evidence; Hellman responded in a 1965 interview that none of her characters were completely good or bad and that the preface was misinterpreted.

=== Accolades ===
The Children's Hour was in serious consideration for the Pulitzer Prize for Drama for 1934–35. The award was presented instead to Zoë Akins' play The Old Maid. Accused of rejecting Hellman's play because of its controversial subject—one of the Pulitzer judges had refused to see it—the selection committee replied that The Children's Hour was not eligible for the award because it was based on a court case and was therefore not an original drama. Critics responded that since The Old Maid was based on a novella by Edith Wharton, it also should have been deemed ineligible. Angered by the Pulitzer Prize decision, the New York Drama Critics' Circle began awarding its own annual prize for drama the following year.

Hellman's play was inspired by the 1810 true story of two Scottish school teachers, Miss Marianne Woods and Miss Jane Pirie, whose lives were destroyed when one of their students accused them of engaging in a sexual relationship. But in the Scottish case, they eventually won their suit, although that did not change the devastation wrought on their lives. At the time of the play's premiere (1934) the mention of homosexuality on stage was illegal in New York State, but authorities chose to overlook its subject matter when the Broadway production was acclaimed by the critics.

== Revivals ==
Patricia Neal, Iris Mann and Kim Hunter in the 1952 Coronet Theatre production directed by Lillian Hellman

Lillian Hellman directed a Broadway revival of The Children's Hour, produced by Kermit Bloomgarden and presented December 18, 1952 – May 30, 1953, at the Coronet Theatre. The cast included Kim Hunter as Karen Wright, Patricia Neal as Martha Dobie, Iris Mann as Mary Tilford, and Katherine Emmet reprising her original role as Mrs. Amelia Tilford. The revised stage production was construed as an implied criticism of the House Un-American Activities Committee.

In 2008, Sarah Frankcom directed a production at the Royal Exchange in Manchester. It starred Maxine Peake (who won a MEN Award) as Karen Wright, Charlotte Emmerson as Martha Dobie, Kate O'Flynn (who won a TMA Award) as Mary Tilford and Milo Twomey as Dr Joseph Cardin.

A revival starring Keira Knightley and Elisabeth Moss, directed by Ian Rickson, was presented at London's Harold Pinter Theatre January 22 – May 7, 2011.

== Adaptations ==
In 1936, the play was made into a film directed by William Wyler. However, because of the Production Code, the story was adapted into a heterosexual love triangle, the controversial name of the play was changed, and the movie was eventually released as These Three. Hellman reportedly worked on the screenplay, keeping virtually all of the play's original dialogue, and was satisfied with the result, saying the play's central theme of gossip was unaffected by the changes.

In 1961, The Children's Hour, also directed by Wyler and starring Audrey Hepburn, Shirley MacLaine, and James Garner, was released. In the UK, New Zealand, and Australia it was titled, The Loudest Whisper.

In 1971, the play was produced for the radio by the BBC in its Saturday Night Theatre series starring Jill Bennett (British actress) and Prunella Scales.

In 1994, the play was again produced for the radio by the BBC in its Monday Play series, starring Clare Holman, Buffy Davis, Miriam Margolyes and Margaret Robertson.

In October 2021, it was reported that Anonymous Content would be adapting the play into a television series.

== Casting ==
Character	1934 Maxine Elliott Theatre production	1935 Gate Theatre Studio production	These Three (1936 film)	1952 Coronet Theatre production	The Children's Hour (1961 film)
Martha Dobie	Anne Revere	Valerie Taylor	Miriam Hopkins	Patricia Neal	Shirley MacLaine
Karen Wright	Katherine Emery	Ursula Jeans	Merle Oberon	Kim Hunter	Audrey Hepburn
Dr. Joseph Cardin	Robert Keith	Leo Genn	Joel McCrea	Robert Pastene	James Garner
Amelia Tilford	Katherine Emmet	Alma Kruger	Mary Merrall	Katherine Emmet	Fay Bainter
Mary Tilford	Florence McGee	Mavis Edwards	Bonita Granville	Iris Mann	Karen Balkin
Lily Mortar	Aline McDermott	Vera Hurst	Catherine Doucet	Mary Finney	Miriam Hopkins
Rosalie Wells	Barbara Beals	Pamela Standisl	Marcia Mae Jones	Janet Parker	Veronica Cartwright
Agatha	Edmonia Nolley	Enid Lindsey	Margaret Hamilton	Leora Thatcher	Hope Summers
Evelyn Munn	Elizabeth Seckel	Hilary Windsor	Carmencita Johnson	Denise Alexander	Mimi Gibson
Helen Burton	Lynne Fisher	Joan Newell		Toni Hallaran	
Mr Burton					William Mims
The mother of Rosalie Wells					Sally Brophy
Peggy Rogers	Eugenia Rawls	Audrey Orme		Sandra March	
Lois Fisher	Jacqueline Rusling	Annabel Maule		Carolyn King	
Catherine	Barbara Leeds	Jenny Lovelace		Nancy Plehn	
Grocery boy	Jack Tyler	Michael Morice		Gordon Russell	Jered Barclay
