= The Children's Hour (film) =

1961 film by William Wyler

- Theatrical release poster
- Directed by: William Wyler
- Screenplay by: John Michael Hayes
- Adaptation by: Lillian Hellman
- Based on: The Children's Hour by Lillian Hellman
- Produced by: William Wyler
- Starring: Audrey Hepburn; Shirley MacLaine; James Garner; Miriam Hopkins; Fay Bainter; Karen Balkin
- Cinematography: Franz F. Planer
- Edited by: Robert Swink
- Music by: Alex North
- Production company: The Mirisch Company
- Distributed by: United Artists
- Release date: December 19, 1961
- Running time: 107 minutes
- Country: United States
- Language: English
- Budget: $3.6 million
- Box office: $3 million or $1.8 million (US/Canada rentals)

The Children's Hour (released as The Loudest Whisper in the United Kingdom, Australia, and New Zealand) is a 1961 American psychological drama produced and directed by William Wyler from a screenplay by John Michael Hayes, based on the 1934 play of the same title by Lillian Hellman. The film stars Audrey Hepburn, Shirley MacLaine, and James Garner, with Miriam Hopkins, Fay Bainter (in her final film role), and Karen Balkin.

In the film, two women open their own boarding school for girls. A female student overhears an argument about an "unnatural" relationship between the two partners, and then starts spreading tales about the duo being lesbian lovers. The women's reputation is consequently ruined by the slander.

== Plot ==
Former college classmates Martha Dobie and Karen Wright open a private boarding school for girls. After an engagement of two years to Dr. Joe Cardin, Karen finally agrees to set a wedding date. Joe is a nephew of the influential Amelia Tilford, whose granddaughter Mary is a student at the school. Mary is a spoiled, conniving child who bullies her classmates.

While being punished for a lie Mary had told, one of her roommates overhears an argument between Martha and her Aunt Lily. Lily accuses Martha of being jealous and having an "unnatural" relationship with Karen. On hearing this, Mary spreads this gossip to her grandmother and Amelia spreads it around the parents of the school.

Karen learns of this and confronts Amelia about Mary accusing Martha and Karen of being lovers. Mary is foiled at convincing others that she personally saw the interactions between Martha and Karen. Using her knowledge that her roommate, Rosalie, has stolen jewelry and other personal items from a number of people, Mary coerces Rosalie into corroborating her story.

The two women file a suit of libel and slander against Amelia. A few months later, Martha and Karen are isolated at the school, having lost all of their students and ruined their reputations after losing the lawsuit. Karen calls off her engagement with Joe when he asks her if what was said about Martha and her was true. When she finds out, Martha points out that other female couples have persevered after being discovered, because of the strength of their love, then admits that she has been in love with Karen for years. Karen says that Martha is just confused about her feelings, but Martha insists it is love, breaking down in tears.

Rosalie's mother finds the collection of stolen items her daughter has kept, leading to the revelation of Mary's lie about Martha and Karen. Amelia tells the judge, who will overturn the outcome of the lawsuit, publish the results in the newspaper, and a full financial settlement will be paid to the teachers. Karen tells Martha that they are still friends, and can work again.

Aunt Lily asks Karen about Martha's whereabouts as her door is locked. Karen breaks loose the door's slide lock with a candleholder and discovers Martha has hanged herself in her room. Karen attends Martha's funeral and silently walks away as Joe, Amelia, and several other townspeople watch her.

== Cast ==
- Audrey Hepburn as Karen Wright
- Shirley MacLaine as Martha Dobie
- James Garner as Dr. Joseph Cardin
- Miriam Hopkins as Lily Mortar
- Fay Bainter as Mrs. Amelia Tilford
- Karen Balkin as Mary Tilford
- Veronica Cartwright as Rosalie Wells
- Mimi Gibson as Evelyn
- Debbie Moldow as Catherine
- William Mims as Mr. Burton
- Sally Brophy as Mrs. Wells (credited as Sallie Brophy)
- Hope Summers as Agatha

== Production ==
=== Background ===
Hellman's play was inspired by the true story of two Scottish school teachers in 1810, Miss Marianne Woods and Miss Jane Pirie, whose lives were destroyed when one of their students accused them of engaging in a sexual relationship; in the Scottish case, they eventually won their suit, although that did not change the devastation wrought on their lives. At the time of the play's premiere (1934), the mention of homosexuality on stage was illegal in New York State, but authorities chose to overlook its subject matter when the Broadway production was acclaimed by the critics.

The first film adaptation of the play was These Three directed by Wyler and released in 1936. Because the Hays Code, in effect at the time of the original film's production, would never permit a film to focus on or even hint at lesbianism, Samuel Goldwyn was the only producer interested in purchasing the rights. He signed Hellman to adapt her play for the screen, and the playwright changed the lie about the two school teachers being lovers into a rumor that one of them had slept with the other's fiancé. Because the Production Code refused to allow Goldwyn to use the play's original title, it was changed to The Lie, and then These Three.

By the time Wyler was ready to film the remake in 1961, the Hays Code had been liberalized to allow screenwriter John Michael Hayes to restore the original nature of the lie. Aside from having Martha hang rather than shoot herself as she had in the play, he remained faithful to Hellman's work, retaining substantial portions of her dialogue.

In the acclaimed 1996 documentary film The Celluloid Closet, Shirley MacLaine said she and Audrey Hepburn never talked about their characters' alleged homosexuality. She also claimed Wyler cut some scenes hinting at Martha's love for Karen because of concerns about critical reaction to the film.

=== Casting ===
The film was James Garner's first after suing Warner Bros. to win his release from the television series Maverick. Wyler broke an unofficial blacklist of the actor by casting him.

Hayley Mills was originally offered the role of Mary.

Miriam Hopkins, who portrays Lily Mortar in the remake, appeared as Martha in These Three.

=== Filming ===
The film's location shooting was done at the historic Shadow Ranch, in present-day West Hills of the western San Fernando Valley.

== Reception ==
=== Critical response ===
Bosley Crowther of The New York Times observed:

In short, there are several glaring holes in the fabric of the plot, and obviously Miss Hellman, who did the adaptation, and John Michael Hayes, who wrote the script, knew they were there, for they have plainly sidestepped the biggest of them. They have not let us know what the youngster whispered to the grandmother that made her hoot with startled indignation and go rushing to the telephone ... And they have not let us into the courtroom where the critical suit for slander was tried. They have only reported the trial and the verdict in one quickly tossed off line. So this drama that was supposed to be so novel and daring because of its muted theme is really quite unrealistic and scandalous in a prim and priggish way. What's more, it is not too well acted, except by Audrey Hepburn in the role of the younger of the school teachers ... Shirley MacLaine as the older school teacher ... inclines to be too kittenish in some scenes and do too much vocal hand-wringing toward the end ... James Garner as the fiancé of Miss Hepburn and Miriam Hopkins as the aunt of Miss MacLaine give performances of such artificial laboring that Mr. Wyler should hang his head in shame. Indeed, there is nothing about this picture of which he can be very proud.

Variety said, "Audrey Hepburn and Shirley MacLaine ... beautifully complement each other. Hepburn's soft sensitivity, marvelous projection and emotional understatement result in a memorable portrayal. MacLaine's enactment is almost equally rich in depth and substance." TV Guide rated the film three-and-a-half out of four stars, adding, "The performances range from adequate (Balkin's) to exquisite (MacLaine's)."

On the review aggregator website Rotten Tomatoes, the film holds an approval rating of 78% based on 9 reviews, with an average rating of 6.8/10. Metacritic, which uses a weighted average, assigned the film a score of 49 out of 100, based on 7 critics, indicating "mixed or average" reviews.

=== Accolades ===
Award	Category	Nominee(s)	Result	Ref.
Academy Awards	Best Supporting Actress	Fay Bainter	Nominated	
Academy Awards	Best Art Direction – Black-and-White	Art Direction: Fernando Carrere; Set Decoration: Edward G. Boyle	Nominated	
Academy Awards	Best Cinematography – Black-and-White	Franz Planer	Nominated	
Academy Awards	Best Costume Design – Black-and-White	Dorothy Jeakins	Nominated	
Academy Awards	Best Sound	Gordon E. Sawyer	Nominated	
Directors Guild of America Awards	Outstanding Directorial Achievement in Motion Pictures	William Wyler	Nominated	
Golden Globe Awards	Best Actress in a Motion Picture – Drama	Shirley MacLaine	Nominated	
Golden Globe Awards	Best Supporting Actress – Motion Picture	Fay Bainter	Nominated	
Golden Globe Awards	Best Director – Motion Picture	William Wyler	Nominated	
Laurel Awards	Top Female Dramatic Performance	Audrey Hepburn	4th Place	
Laurel Awards	Top Female Dramatic Performance	Shirley MacLaine	Won	
Laurel Awards	Top Female Supporting Performance	Fay Bainter	Nominated	

== See also ==
- History of homosexuality in American film
- List of American films of 1961
- List of LGBT-related films
