= Marianne Woods =

School founder (b. 1779, d. 1833)

- Born: 1781
- Died: 1870 (aged 88–89)
- Occupation: Schoolteacher
- Known for: Libel case in Edinburgh in 1811

Marianne Woods (1781 – 1870) was an English woman who opened a girls' school in Drumsheugh Gardens, Edinburgh in the autumn of 1809 and who became involved in a court case as a result of being accused of lesbianism with the co-founder of the school, Jane Pirie (1779–1833).

Her accuser was Jane Cumming, a pupil of mixed race, and a granddaughter of Lady Helen Cumming Gordon, who alleged that the two women "engaged in irregular sexual practices" and "lewd and indecent behaviour." Jane Cumming was the first pupil to leave the school, and within forty-eight hours, all the other pupils left as well. Lady Cumming Gordon spread rumours of these allegations and the school was forced to close in November 1810, depriving Woods and Pirie, both in their 20s, of their good names and only means of support.

"I am utterly ignorant of what was laid to my charge and I am not conscious of anything," Marianne Woods told one mother.

Marianne Woods and Jane Pirie sued Lady Cumming Gordon for libel and the case went to court on 15 March 1811. Despite winning the case in 1812, the case was appealed to the House of Lords over the level of the damages, which ultimately dismissed the appeal years later in 1819. The pair had successfully claimed £10,000 from their wealthy accuser. Yet they were financially ruined as they received no more than £1000 each after legal fees.

Although Marianne Woods obtained employment in London, at Camden House Academy where she had previously taught, Jane Pirie stayed in Edinburgh and was unable to find employment, and "possibly had a nervous breakdown."

The story of the court case was the inspiration for Lillian Hellman's 1934 play The Children's Hour.
