= These Three =

1936 American drama film directed by William Wyler

- Original poster
- Directed by: William Wyler
- Written by: Lillian Hellman
- Based on: The Children's Hour by Lillian Hellman
- Produced by: Samuel Goldwyn
- Starring: Miriam Hopkins; Merle Oberon; Joel McCrea; Bonita Granville
- Cinematography: Gregg Toland
- Edited by: Daniel Mandell
- Music by: Alfred Newman
- Production company: Samuel Goldwyn Productions
- Distributed by: United Artists
- Release date: March 18, 1936
- Running time: 93 minutes
- Country: United States
- Language: English

These Three is a 1936 American drama film directed by William Wyler and written by Lillian Hellman, based on her play The Children's Hour. Miriam Hopkins, Merle Oberon, Joel McCrea, and Bonita Granville stars.

A 1961 remake of the film, also directed by Wyler, was released as The Children's Hour in the US and The Loudest Whisper in the UK.

== Plot ==
Following graduation, college friends Karen Wright and Martha Dobie transform Karen's Massachusetts farm into a boarding school. Although new to the area, they are able to find pupils with the assistance of the wealthy Amelia Tilford, who enrolls her malevolent granddaughter Mary and encourages other families to enroll their daughters. Shortly before the school opens, Martha's aunt, Lily Mortar, arrives and forces her way into a teaching position as a way to continue sponging off Martha.

Karen and local doctor Joe Cardin begin to date, unaware that Martha is in love with him. One evening, Joe falls asleep in a chair in Martha's room while waiting for Karen to return to the school. He wakes with a start and breaks a glass, which wakes up Mary Tilford. Before he leaves, he casually refers to his and Karen's plans to marry, and Mary watches from the shadows as Martha sobs quietly once she thinks she is alone.

When Karen punishes Mary for missing classes and lying, Mary acts as though she has a pain and falls to the floor in a faint. Although they are not convinced by Mary's performance, Karen and Martha call Joe to examine her. While Joe and Karen are busy with Mary, Martha decides to finally fire Aunt Lily, who is not a good teacher. Lily feels slighted, even though Martha offers to continue to support her, and they have an argument before she goes, during which Lily confronts Martha with her suspicions about the young woman's true feelings for Joe. Martha hears a noise and discovers Rosalie Wells and Evelyn Munn, who are Mary's roommates, listening at the door. Flustered, she accidentally closes the door on Rosalie's arm, slightly injuring her. Back in their room, Evelyn tells Mary about the argument between Martha and Lily.

Feeling persecuted, Mary decides to run away from the school. When her grandmother Amelia just wants to send her back, she tells Amelia a grossly distorted version both of what she witnessed between Martha and Joe and of the argument between Martha and Lily, suggesting Martha and Joe engaged in an illicit sexual affair. To verify the story, Mary has Amelia talk to Rosalie, who she has brought with her and coerced by threatening to reveal that Rosalie stole another student's bracelet. Mary even says that Martha injured Rosalie's arm intentionally. Amelia is shocked by the revelation of a love triangle between Karen, Joe, and Martha, and alerts the other parents who have girls at the school, all of whom withdraw their daughters.

The trio sue Amelia for slander, but they lose their case. Karen and Martha are unable to enroll any new students, and Joe is fired from his job at the hospital. Lily returns, but Martha resents her for not coming back to testify during the case and tells her to leave. Joe asks Karen to come with him to Vienna, where he has gotten a job. She balks when he mentions that Martha is also invited and finally asks if there was ever anything between Martha and him. Unable to fully believe his denial after what she heard in court, she tells him to go to Vienna by himself.

Once Joe is gone, Martha admits to Karen that she loves Joe, though she says she never told him, and then gets on the same train as Lily. In passing, Lily mentions having seen Mary and Rosalie with the missing bracelet, and Martha realizes what happened. She gets off the train and convinces Rosalie to tell Amelia the truth. Amelia offers Martha compensation, but Martha refuses, asking only that Amelia take Karen a message from her: "stay with Joe, wherever he is." Martha leaves, Amelia talks to Karen, and Karen goes to Vienna to be with Joe.

== Cast ==
- Miriam Hopkins as Martha Dobie
- Merle Oberon as Karen Wright
- Joel McCrea as Dr. Joseph Cardin
- Catharine Doucet as Mrs. Lily Mortar
- Alma Kruger as Mrs. Amelia Tilford
- Bonita Granville as Mary Tilford
- Marcia Mae Jones as Rosalie Wells
- Carmencita Johnson as Evelyn Munn
- Mary Ann Durkin as Joyce Walton
- Margaret Hamilton as Agatha
- Walter Brennan as "Taxy" Driver

== Production ==
Lillian Hellman's 1934 play The Children's Hour was inspired by the true story of two Scottish school teachers whose lives were destroyed in 1810 when they were falsely accused by one of their students of engaging in a lesbian relationship. At the time, the mention of homosexuality on stage was illegal in New York State, but authorities chose to overlook the play's subject matter when its Broadway production was acclaimed by critics.

Because the Hays Code, which was in effect when the film was produced, would never permit a film to focus on or even hint at lesbianism, Samuel Goldwyn was the only producer interested in purchasing the film rights to the play. He signed Hellman to adapt her play for the screen, and the playwright changed the lie from being that the two school teachers were lovers to it being that one of the teachers had slept with the other's fiancé. The Hays Office even prevented the use of, or a reference to, the play's original title, so Hellman also changed the title of her script to The Lie; it was not until after principal photography was completed that the film was rechristened These Three.

Goldwyn had already cast the three leads when he offered William Wyler, who, until then, had helmed mostly B pictures and Westerns, the opportunity to direct the film, along with a five-year contract. This film would be the first of eight films Wyler and Goldwyn would work on together. Although Wyler wasn't completely happy with Goldwyn's casting choices, he accepted the offer, though he insisted on a three-year contract instead. He tried to convince Goldwyn to replace contract player Joel McCrea with Leslie Howard, but the producer refused and, unwisely, told McCrea about Wyler's preference, which led to difficulties between the actor and director during filming.

The Lux Radio Theatre aired a one-hour adaptation of the film on December 6, 1937, with Barbara Stanwyck as Martha Dobie, Errol Flynn as Dr. Joe Cardin, Mary Astor as Karen Wright, and Constance Collier as Lily Mortar. Alma Kruger and Marcia Mae Jones reprised their roles from the film as Amelia Tilford and Rosalie Wells, respectively.

== Critical reception ==
Frank S. Nugent of The New York Times wrote: "Miss Hellman's job of literary carpentry is little short of brilliant. Upon the framework of her stage success she has constructed an absorbing, tautly written and dramatically vital screen play. To it, in turn, a gifted cast headed by Merle Oberon, Miriam Hopkins and Joel McCrea has contributed lavishly of its talents, aided by superb direction and exceptionally fine photography. In its totality the picture emerges as one of the finest screen dramas in recent years . . . Strong, turbulent and caustic, These Three is an unusual picture and it has been brought to the screen with perception, beauty and a keen sense of drama."

The review in Variety said of Bonita Granville and Marcia Mae Jones: "Theirs are inspired performances." It added: "Hellman, if anything, has improved upon the original in scripting the triangle as a dramatis personae of romantic frustration, three basically wholesome victims of an unwholesome combination of circumstance. McCrea was never better in translating a difficult assignment intelligently and sympathetically. The well bred restraint of Hopkins and Oberon in their travail with the mixture of juvenile emotions at their boarding school is likewise impressive."

Writing for The Spectator in 1936, Graham Greene observed: "I have seldom been so moved by any fictional film . . . After ten minutes or so of the usual screen sentiment, quaintness and exaggeration, one began to watch the incredulous pleasure of nothing less than life." Greene praised the acting of the protagonists portrayed by Oberon, Hopkins, and, to a lesser extent, McCrea, as well as the "shocking mastery" of the performances by Granville and Jones as the antagonists.

The review in Film Daily read, in part: "Tense, dramatic, this is one of the most powerful pictures that has come to the talking screen . . . Miriam Hopkins and Merle Oberon give splendid performances, but it is the work of little Bonita Granville, as the troublemaker, which will attract the most attention."

John Mosher of The New Yorker wrote that "quite a good piece of work has been done with this somewhat problematic drama". He added: "With all the drastic alterations made in the plot, it is surprising how many of the original episodes and scenes have been retained."

In the 21st century, TVGuide.com rated the film 4½ out of five stars, calling it "gripping, adult cinema" and commenting that "Oberon gives one of her best dramatic performances and McCrea is also quite fine. The two child actresses have the showiest parts, but the real performances to watch are those of Alma Kruger and Miriam Hopkins. Hopkins, in particular, has rarely been better, her intense, high-strung quality perfectly suited to the role of a woman unable to stop her world from falling apart around her."

== Awards and nominations ==
At the first ceremony at which the category was contested, Bonita Granville was nominated for the Academy Award for Best Supporting Actress, but lost to Gale Sondergaard (who won for her performance in Anthony Adverse).
