= Absurdist fiction =

Genre of novels, plays, poems, films, or other media

Absurdist fiction is a genre of novels, plays, poems, films, or other media that focuses on the experiences of characters in situations where they cannot find any inherent purpose in life, most often represented by ultimately meaningless actions and events that call into question the certainty of existential concepts such as truth or value. In some cases, it may overlap with literary nonsense.

The absurdist genre of literature arose in the 1950s and 1960s, first predominantly in France and Germany, prompted by post-war disillusionment. Absurdist fiction is a reaction against the surge in Romanticism in Paris in the 1830s, the collapse of religious tradition in Germany, and the societal and philosophical revolution led by the expressions of Søren Kierkegaard and Friedrich Nietzsche.

Common elements in absurdist fiction include satire, dark humor, incongruity, the abasement of reason, and controversy regarding the philosophical condition of being "nothing". Absurdist fiction in play form is known as Absurdist Theatre. Both genres are characterised by a focus on the experience of the characters, centred on the idea that life is incongruous, irreconcilable and meaningless. The integral characteristic of absurdist fiction involves the experience of the struggle to find an intrinsic purpose in life, depicted by characters in their display of meaningless actions in the futile events they take part in.

Absurdism as a philosophical movement is an extension of, or divergence from, Existentialism, which focuses on the pointlessness of mankind and specifically the emotional angst and anxiety present when the existence of purpose is challenged. Existentialist and agnostic perspectives are explored in absurdist novels and theatre in their expression of plot and characters. Major absurdist authors include Franz Kafka, Albert Camus, Samuel Beckett, and Eugène Ionesco.

== Characteristics ==
A great deal of absurdist fiction may be humorous or irrational in nature. The absurdist humor is described as a manner of comedy that relies on non-sequiturs, violation of causality, and unpredictable juxtapositions. However, the hallmark of the genre is neither comedy nor nonsense, but rather, the study of human behavior under circumstances (whether realistic or fantastical) that appear to be purposeless and philosophically absurd. Absurdist fiction posits little judgment about characters or their actions; that task is left to the reader. Also, the "moral" of the story is generally not explicit, and the themes or characters' realizations — if any — are often ambiguous in nature. A story has the essence of presenting logic followed rigorously to an illogical end.

Additionally, unlike many other forms of fiction, absurdist works will not necessarily have a traditional plot structure (i.e., rising action, climax, falling action, etc.). The conventional elements of fiction such as plot, characterization, and development tend to be absent. Some scholars explain that this fiction entails a "going away from" a norm. There is also the case of the questioning of the validity of human reason, from which perceptions of the natural laws arise.

The absurdist fiction also does not seek to appeal to the so-called collective unconscious as it is fiercely individualistic and almost exclusively focuses on exploring an individual's or a being's subjective feelings of its existence.

== Overview ==
The absurdist genre grew out of the modernist literature of the late 19th and early 20th century in direct opposition to the Victorian literature which was prominent just prior to this period. It was largely influenced by the existentialist and nihilist movements in philosophy, and the Dada and surrealist movements in art. Existential and nihilistic philosophical influences on absurdist fiction were resultant of the post-war disillusionment. Absurdist fiction novelists and composers demanded freedom from the conventions prevalent in the 1940 philosophical movement in France. Other historical events that impacted the literary movement's style and philosophy include the atomic bomb and the Cold War.

Psychologists at the University of California, Santa Barbara, and the University of British Columbia published a report in 2009 showing that reading absurdist tales improved test subjects' ability to find patterns. Their findings summarized that, when people have to work to find consistency and meaning in a fragmented story, it increases "the cognitive mechanisms responsible for implicitly learning statistical regularities".

== Context and origins ==
Franz Kafka, Jean-Paul Sartre, Samuel Beckett, Eugène Ionesco, Albert Camus, Saul Bellow, Donald Barthelme and Cormac McCarthy are considered to be the most well-known composers of absurdist fiction. Kafka (1883–1924) was a German-speaking Bohemian novelist, and a notorious absurdist. Writers that influenced Kafka include Friedrich Nietzsche, Edgar Allan Poe, Charles Dickens and more. Kafka's most popular fictional stories include "The Judgment", published in 1912; The Metamorphosis, published 1915; "In the Penal Colony", published 1919; and "A Hunger Artist", published 1922. The Trial, written between 1914 and 1915, is recognised as Kafka's most well-known fiction. In its "mythic symbolism of a world gone berserk", Kafka's use of mythology, comedy, aphorism and surrealism epitomise the distinctive features of absurdist fiction. Franz Kafka's influence on absurdism was so great that he is referred to by some as the "King of the Absurd" and a leader of the absurd movement. Others argue that Kafka was predominantly a Surrealist, however Kafka clarifies his unique style as "the blend of absurd, surreal and mundane which gave rise to the adjective 'Kafkaesque'". Samuel Beckett was also an early absurdist; an Irish novelist, playwright, short story writer, theatre director, poet, and literary translator. Beckett's well-known Waiting for Godot, premiered in 1953, is classified within absurdist theatre using techniques of tragicomedy. The characteristics introduced by Beckett included bitter humour and despair, and a vivid and spontaneous improvisation on the absurdity of theatre (Dickson, Andrew, 2017). Eugène Ionesco was a Romanian French playwright, one of the foremost composers of French avant-garde theatre and a leader of absurdism. Ionesco's The Chairs (1952) was branded as a "tragic farce" by Ionesco himself in its experimentation of absurdist motifs, existentialism and nonsensical verse, of which elaborates on incommunicability in our human lives.

== Ideology ==
The term "absurd" has roots in the Latin "absurdus", meaning "contrary to reason" or "inharmonious". The term elaborates on the concept of the modern word corresponding to the identification of the irrational and incongruous nature of everyday life. The ideology and philosophy behind the absurdist fiction genre stems from nihilism and existentialism extracted from the 20th-century world. Søren Kierkegaard (1813–1855), known as the "father of existentialism", was a prolific Danish writer who opposed conventional boundaries of philosophy, psychology, theology, fiction and literary criticism. Kierkegaard's philosophy contends with the plausibility of Christendom, and inherently disputes the sense of purpose it prompts in personal life. The concept of the absurd was used by Kierkegaard to term the point in which faith becomes indefensible, yet valid for those who employ it, and it alone. Kierkegaard heavily influenced the work of Jean-Paul Sartre and Albert Camus. Existentialism as a philosophical approach or theory emphasises the single individual's existence and the concept of an individual as a free agent in determining their own meaning or purpose in life. On the other hand, nihilism is the recognition that life has no intrinsic meaning. Absurdist fiction in relation to existentialism expresses what happens when human existence has no meaning or purpose, therefore all communication breaks down. Eugène Ionesco's The Bald Soprano (1950) is an absurdist fiction text which emphasises in depth the notion of mankind's inability to communicate with each other. Friedrich Nietzsche (1844–1900) was a cultural critic, composer, poet, philologist, and a Latin and Greek egg scholar who also yielded profound inspiration in Western philosophy and modern intellectual history. Nietzsche is another primary influencer on the philosophy and ideology behind the absurd. His interest in nihilism, in particular his views on Christianity and God, alludes to the traditions of the Western world in their reliance on religion as a "moral compass" and source of meaning. Nietzsche claimed that this dependence is now unviable, appearing in his book The Gay Science, published 1882, translated in 1974. The writings of Nietzsche influenced absurdist fiction in the influence on Sartre and Albert Camus. Particularly, Camus' understanding of nihilism was heavily motivated by the conception that Nietzsche put forth of life and death and the nihilistic perspectives of such.

=== Absurdist fiction in novels ===
French writer Albert Camus is the novelist that most literary critics date the concept of absurdist fiction to, with Camus' most famous novel, L'Étranger (The Stranger, 1942), and his philosophical essay "The Myth of Sisyphus" (1942). The Bohemian, German-speaking, Franz Kafka is another absurdist fiction novelist. Kafka's novel The Trial was published in 1925 after Kafka's death in 1924. Kafka's novel encompasses mankind's inability to engage in communication in a purposeless world.

== Examples ==
Examples of absurdist fiction writers include:

- John Swartzwelder
- Edward Albee
- Samuel Beckett (e.g., Waiting for Godot, The Unnamable)
- Albert Camus
- Fyodor Dostoevsky
- Jean Genet (e.g., The Maids)
- Nikolai Gogol
- James Kelman (e.g., How Late It Was, How Late)
- Franz Kafka (e.g., The Metamorphosis, The Trial, The Castle)
- Haruki Murakami
- Jean-Paul Sartre
- Witold Gombrowicz (eg. Ferdydurke, Ivona, princess of Burgundia)
- Sławomir Mrożek (e.g. The Police (play), The Ugupu Bird
- Philip K. Dick (e.g., A Scanner Darkly)
- Maccio Capatonda
- Kurt Vonnegut
- Kōbō Abe
- Daniil Kharms
- Osamu Dazai
- Boris Vian (e.g., Froth on the Daydream)
- Terry Pratchett (e.g., Discworld)
- Grant Morrison (e.g., Doom Patrol)

Individual absurdist works include:

- Dino Buzzati's The Tartar Steppe
- Ralph Ellison's Invisible Man
- Muriel Spark's The Driver's Seat and The Hothouse by the East River
- Edward Albee's Seascape and The American Dream
- Joseph Heller's Catch-22
- Thomas Pynchon's V. and The Crying of Lot 49
- John Irving's The World According to Garp
- Stanley Kubrick's Dr. Strangelove
- Plays by Eugène Ionesco (e.g., The Bald Soprano; The Lesson, etc.)
- Some early plays of Harold Pinter
- Some works by Tom Stoppard (e.g., Rosencrantz and Guildenstern Are Dead)
- Alexander Sukhovo-Kobylin's Tarelkin's Death
- Witold Gombrowicz's Cosmos
- Netflix TV series BoJack Horseman
- Lars von Trier's Riget
- Brian Patrick Butler's Friend of the World
- Noah Baumbach's White Noise adapted from the novel written by Don Delillo
- Adhik Ravichandran's Good Bad Ugly
- Guillermo Stitch's Lake of Urine

Examples of notable absurdist filmmakers include:

- Ingmar Bergman
- Luis Buñuel
- Daniels (e.g., Swiss Army Man and Everything Everywhere All at Once)
- Werner Herzog
- Harmony Korine
- Coen brothers
- Charlie Kaufman
- Yorgos Lanthimos
- David Lynch
- Roman Polanski (e.g., Knife in the Water, Repulsion, Cul-de-sac, Carnage, etc.)
- Tim Heidecker and Eric Wareheim
- Quentin Dupieux

=== Characteristics and techniques ===
Albert Camus' The Myth of Sisyphus (1942) extracts from the Greek fable of a man forced to continuously roll a rock up a mountain only for it to roll back down the mountain due to its own weight, a dilemma that lasts for eternity. Camus elucidates his own symbolism as a representation of the human condition in a world where we face the universal difficulty of making sense of events; however instead of turning to suicide that we must reconcile with the "elusive feeling of absurdity" and endure it to the best of our abilities. Franz Kafka's The Trial (1925) follows the tale of Josef K., a man who is arrested and prosecuted by an authority that is remote and inaccessible; neither he nor the reader is told the nature of his crime or why he was prosecuted. Kafka uses restrained prose throughout the novel to add dramatic irony as well as the illogical and inconsistent line of events of the arrest and court case of Joseph K. Kafka's novel can be perceived to imply a gap in the rational world as a result of hyper-rationalization consuming society, an example highlighted by Kafka being the judiciary. Kafka employs erroneous alliteration and literary manipulation to compose a nonsensical, existentialist novel that exemplifies the inhumanity, alienation and absurdity persisting in the modern world alongside the impacts of totalitarianism, injustice and bureaucracy as a whole.

== Theatre of the Absurd ==
The Theatre of the Absurd is termed as a post-World War One designation for absurdist fiction plays, specifically those written by primarily European playwrights in the late twentieth century, also as one for the style of theatre which has evolved from their work. Martin Esslin, a literary critic, coined the term "Theatre of the Absurd" in his 1960 essay Theatre of the Absurd. Esslin related these selected plays based on the broad theme of the absurd, similar to the way Camus used the term in his 1942 essay The Myth of Sisyphus. The ideology of the Theatre of the Absurd is drawn from existentialism and expresses the result of human existence becoming deprived of meaning or purpose and the result of all communication thus breaking down. Logical construction and argument within absurdist theatre gave way to characteristics of irrational and illogical speech and the ultimate conclusion of silence. The Theatre of the Absurd involves a fascination with absurdity in a range of forms; the existential, philosophical, emotional and dramaturgical. The Theatre of the Absurd as a dramatic form inherently pushes theatre to the extreme, while posing questions about what both reality and unreality truly look like. Martin Esslin named the four defining playwrights of the Theatre of the Absurd movement as Samuel Beckett, Arthur Adamov, Eugène Ionesco, and Jean Genet. In later editions of his essay he included a fifth playwright, Harold Pinter. Other writers that are also associated with this movement by Esslin and other critics are Tom Stoppard, Friedrich Dürrenmatt, Fernando Arrabal, Edward Albee, Boris Vian, and Jean Tardieu.

=== Characteristics ===
The Theatre of the Absurd subverts conventional theatrical form audiences have come to expect when viewing a play. Movement of the plot is arbitrary; characters of absurdist theatre are mostly unfamiliar and strangely motivated, scenery is often unrecognizable and sometimes unchanging or desolate, and dialogue appears to be nonsense. To absurdist playwrights, chaos and irrationality represent reality better than rationality and order. Plays can be both tragic and comic in nature, characteristic of the tragicomedy genre in theatre.

=== Examples ===
- Alliteration
- Repetition
- Lists
- Allusion
- Dramatic devices
- Neologism
- Convolution
- Stream of consciousness
- Irony
- Satire

=== Theatre of the Absurd plays ===
Eugène Ionesco's The Bald Soprano (1950) is a memorable absurdist theatre play. Samuel Beckett's Waiting for Godot (1953) is an absurdist theatre play with two acts using dramatic techniques. Other examples include Jean-Paul Sartre's play No Exit (1944), Max Frisch's play The Firebugs (1953) and Ezio D'Errico's play The Anthill and Time of the Locusts (1954). Thornton Wilder's The Long Christmas Dinner (1931) and Jean Tardieu's Underground Lovers (1934) are earlier examples.

=== Techniques and devices examples ===
Romanian-French playwright Eugène Ionesco's The Bald Soprano (1950) is a dominating play central to the Theatre of the Absurd, its "dreamlike symphony of nonsensical speech and disjointed associations expose how hopeless human communication is". The "nonsensical speech" and "disjointed associations" are key elements of the Theatre of the Absurd. Most of the dialogue in Ionesco's play has little meaning and frequently there is outright gibberish in the actors' speeches. The satire and nonsensical discourse present throughout Ionesco's text serves his purpose in presenting how nonsensical mundane life can be. Ionesco's engagement with existentialism is also characteristic of absurdist theatre, and distinct in the utilisation of the seemingly ridiculous English language and society's unwillingness to communicate with each other. Ionesco's The Bald Soprano encompasses mankind's inability to engage in communication in a purposeless world, reiterating the influence of Existentialism on Absurdist Fiction and how this presents in texts within the Theatre of the Absurd literary genre.

Samuel Beckett's Waiting for Godot (1953), an originally French text, is an absurdist theatre drama that is described as one of the most important plays of the 20th century despite its early reception. The play was first performed on January 5, 1953, at Theatre de babylone in Paris. The reception of the play in the 1950s can be interpreted by critics reviews. Literary critic Vivian Mercer claimed that the play was "a play in which nothing happens, twice", alluding to the two acts that take a cyclical form. Alfonso Sastre, another literary critic reviewing Beckett's text, described the play as "a death certificate for hope"; he continues, "what is so fascinating about waiting for Godot; [is] that nothing happens. It is a lucid testimony of nothingness." Beckett's desolate universe in his play is rendered by Absurdist techniques; an unchanging landscape, characters subjected to random and whimsical acts of violence with cyclical discourse. Beckett captures the sense of perpetual anticipation for meaning in humanity in the portrayal of the relationship between 'Gogo' and 'Didi', a strong interdependence mixed with irritability. The tragicomedy element to Beckett's absurdist fiction play adds a comic futility that can be compared to slapstick comedy and cartoon characters such as the characters Tom and Jerry. The relationship between the two characters in Waiting for Godot (Vladimir and Estragon) is whimsical, interdependent yet irritable. Their nature, dialogue and interactions are reminiscent of familiar comical duos such as Laurel and Hardy and Tom and Jerry.

== See also ==
- Absurdism
- Absurdist humor
- Existentialism
- Literary nonsense
- Self-referential humor
- Theatre of the Absurd
- List of genres
