= The Bachelors (Spark novel) =

1960 novel by Muriel Spark

- First edition cover
- Author: Muriel Spark
- Cover artist: Victor Reinganum
- Language: English
- Publisher: Macmillan
- Publication date: 1960
- Publication place: United Kingdom
- Media type: Print (Hardback & Paperback)
- OCLC: 41211640
- Dewey Decimal: 823/.914 21
- LC Class: PR6037.P29 B29 1999

The Bachelors is a novel written in 1960 by the Scottish author Muriel Spark, referred to by The New York Times as "the most gifted and innovative British novelist". It follows a group of British bachelors whose misogynistic world is shattered when they suddenly find themselves the target of blackmail and fraud.

== Story ==
The main characters, the bachelors, are a barrister, a "priest", a detective, a love-seeking Irishman, a handwriting expert, and a mastermind of a spiritual medium. In this story they arc from complete contentment, sitting cozily about in their London clubs and shopping on Oxford Street, to be troubled by various causes, ranging from fraud to blackmail. They all end up involved in a court case, a criminal prosecution for forgery and fraud, with the trial being the climax of the action. In the centre of the story stands the main character, the pale Patrick Seton, the medium, while the other bachelors are tormented by every cause — epileptic fits, forgeries, malignant spiritualism and, last but not least, murder.

== Principal characters ==
- Patrick Seton, a spiritualist who is being prosecuted for fraudulent conversion by Freda Flower, a past admirer, whilst at the same time plotting the murder of his current girlfriend Alice Dawes, who is pregnant and refuses to 'get rid' of the baby.
- Ronald Bridges, a handwriting expert who has epilepsy and is being called to examine a letter supposedly written by Freda asking Patrick to use the enclosed cheque for £2000 to 'further his psychic and spiritualistic work'. Freda claims she gave the cheque to Patrick to invest in bonds on her behalf.
- Elsie Forrest, a friend of Alice who steals the letter from Ronald to aid Patrick's case but then offers to give the letter to anyone who will sleep with her.
