= Aileen Pippett =

British journalist and biographer

(Winifred) Aileen Pippett née Side (9 July 1895–4 January 1974) was a British journalist and biographer resident in the United States, author of the first full-length biography of Virginia Woolf, The Moth and the Star, first published in 1953.

== Early life ==
The third of four daughters (there being also sons) of railway official Charles Henry Side (1859-1928), of Hammersmith, and his wife Eliza Alice (1862-1942), daughter of Metropolitan Police inspector John Searle, of Hammersmith, formerly of Kensington, Aileen Side was educated at the Godolphin and Latymer School and London School of Economics. The Side family had intellectual interests, with the children raised attending political meetings, and having the opportunity to meet George Bernard Shaw and William Butler Yeats. Her brother, Charles Eric Side, of Goldfield Mill House (next to Goldfield Mill), Tring, Hertfordshire, a quantity surveyor and Civil Engineer in Chief in the Royal Navy, was married to Malvin, sister of Nathan Isaacs, a metal merchant and educational psychologist whose first wife was the psychologist and psychoanalyst Susan Sutherland Fairhurst, headmistress of the experimental Malting House School, Cambridge. Charles and Malvin Side's grandson, philosopher Timothy Williamson, was appointed Wykeham Professor of Logic at the University of Oxford in 2000. The extensive diaries written by her eldest sister, Ruby Alice Side (later Thompson; 1884–1970)- an aspiring novelist and "an outspoken feminist" (writing, in 1939, "I find myself becoming more and more a feminist. I survey this world in which I have to live and I have no use for men's politics or men's religion. I will not live by any man's rule") with "ideas on education, equality, and financial independence for women"- have been used in feminist studies, particularly illustrating independence within marriage and middle-class women's lives during the Second World War. The second sister, Gladys (1889-1974), was educated at the University of London and became headmistress of a school in India educating the children of civil servants, later teaching at Devonport High School for Girls. The youngest sister, Joan (1903-1976), a nurse, was sister-in-law of the engineer and archaeologist Leslie R. H. Willis.

== Career ==
=== Journalism and literary criticism ===
Pippett was a contributor to the New York Times Book Review, Saturday Review, Vogue, Horizon, and Collier's Encyclopedia, amongst others, primarily as a book reviewer.

An early advocate of the work of Muriel Spark, she observed in a 1957 review of Spark's first novel, The Comforters, that on the strength of "a brilliant first novel", "enjoyable and memorable", "Trend-watchers are advised to note the name of Muriel Spark. Before very long they may be able to boast that they read her when." She retained an interest in Spark's career, being "first out of the blocks" to review The Very Fine Clock (1968). The poet and writer Carol Bergé recalled the "companionable" Pippett as "very encouraging to (her) writing" when they met in New York in the late 1950s whilst staying at the Hotel Albert.

=== The Moth and the Star ===
==== Writing process ====
The Moth and the Star, the first full-length biographical treatment of Virginia Woolf, was first published in 1953 by Little, Brown and Company. Through friendship with Woolf's close friend Vita Sackville-West, she had access to personal letters and other resources which were referenced in the book. Leonard Woolf was displeased at this disclosure of private discussion, and publication of the book was restricted to the United States. It was reported at the time that she had the "intelligent and affectionate cooperation of V.W.'s husband [Leonard Woolf] and of Vita Sackville-West, [Woolf's] good friend", indicating a change in Leonard Woolf's view of the book following its publication. Her relationship with Leonard Woolf however began somewhat poorly, in light of her goal of producing the book (she had received a similarly unenthusiastic response from Virginia's sister Vanessa Bell): "having been discouraged by Leonard, Aileen Pippett was befriended by Vita Sackville-West, who let her study all Virginia's letters to her". According to Woolf, he was promised a look at the first draft and completed typescript, but was only in fact sent the proofs of the book; he maintained he had not given permission for quotations from his wife's letters to Vita Sackville-West, which in any case he said he had never seen: "Perhaps he could not, in all fairness, insist that Pippett drop the letters from her soon-to-be-published volume, but as copyright holder he could, and did, refuse to allow an English edition of the biography." Leonard evidently had in mind his own publication of these letters; also in January 1955, he wrote to Vita on the subject of publishing Virginia's letters to her, but by April his enthusiasm had waned. Woolf was thanked in a letter by Pippett's husband for allowing the book to be published in the United States. Sackville-West, who "had formed a strong link" with Aileen Pippett, "fulminated against (Woolf) selling Virginia's manuscripts to America", writing "What an odd man he is. Well, they shan't have Mrs Dalloway or Orlando; it would give me great pleasure to refuse some enormous offer, and tell Leonard that I had done so". Susan Hudson Fox suggests that Leonard Woolf "shaped his wife's authorial persona, her literary reputation, in a way that would bring her (and him) the most favor", noting in relation to this his disapproval of Pippett's quotation from the letters.

==== Assessments ====
The book was welcomed as the first of its kind, although the more recent general consensus is that it was superseded by later in-depth biographical treatments based on fuller access to Woolf's personal papers and other resources, particularly the 1972 biography written by Woolf's nephew Quentin Bell. The Ladies' Home Journal observed "Virginia Woolf enthusiasts will be glad to know that the new biography about her, THE MOTH AND THE STAR, by Aileen Pippett, is worthy of its subject", noting that its use of her letters to Sackville-West allows the reader to "listen in on the intimacies of one of the most esoteric circles in London's long literary history"; The Library Journal wrote "'Fragile as a moth and enduring as a star' is Mrs Pippett's way of describing Virginia Woolf, and for that very insight she will endear herself to the many readers of V.W., who will welcome this first long biography of the writer who has enchanted and puzzled readers for many years". The United States Quarterly Book Review remarked on Pippett's "conscientious effort 'to reconstruct this very elusive and complex personality'", noting the "advantages enjoyed by no earlier biographer of Virginia Woolf... Mrs Woolf's diary, a series of her letters to Vita Sackville-West, and... Leonard Woolf's casual advice."

In Biography- Writing Lives (2020), Catherine N. Parke observes "Aileen Pippett's The Moth and the Star... proposes a metaphorical thesis about Woolf's personality", referring to the same image as the Library Journal; Parke notes the book was based on both access to private papers and interviews with "many of Woolf's friends". In 2007, the book was written of as "the first significant, now long-forgotten biography" of Woolf. Susan Braley, in a survey of biographical treatment of Virginia Woolf, considered that "early biographers of Woolf sought to establish a unitary identity for their subject", and that "Aileen Pippett begins this tradition by presenting Woolf as a literary icon to be worshipped from afar", resulting in Woolf's presentation in "hagiographic terms". Braley observes that the hagiographic treatment of early biographical accounts of Woolf derived from personal closeness to the subject and the trauma of her death, citing statements of this sort from Woolf's niece Angelica Garnett, and friends Vita Sackville-West, Duncan Grant, and John Lehmann, "designed to celebrate a lost loved one"; since Pippett only met Woolf on one occasion, her biography is not "driven by hyperbole because of recent grief or close ties to her subject", but is "necessarily governed by the personal impressions and selective memories" of Woolf's relatives and friends. Braley notes that "Woolf's five-volume diary, her complete letters and her essays were not yet available", and that the primary available sources of information- A Writer's Diary (prior to publication), letters to Vita Sackville-West, and discussions with friends- were not representative, resulting in the necessity of Pippett resorting to speculation.

The writing style and tone of the book, despite some praise at the time of publication, was later criticised, as was what later assessments observed to be a lack of rigorous reference to materials and less-than-strict adherence to subsequently-established facts: Studies in Literature observed it to be "beautifully written but sometimes sparsely documented"; Kirkus Reviews, contrasting it with Quentin Bell's 1972 biography, "purely historical", criticised its "sometimes numinous sentimentality" and "admitted disregard for what [Pippett] called 'literal facts'". The New York Times review of Quentin Bell's biography by Michael Rosenthal lambasted Pippett's work, by contrast, as "an indigestible concoction of biographical fact, sentimental appreciation and simplistic plot summary whose very title, in its precious metaphoric way, suggests the extent to which Pippett strained to deal with her subject through her own lamentable version of Woolf's sensibility", whilst noting Bell's considerable advantage over other biographers "as the son of Clive and Vanessa Bell and the nephew of Virginia, Bell would seem to be the most qualified person to reveal the facts of her life." However, at around the same time, in Virginia Woolf Quarterly (1972) it was observed that "Aileen Pippett... did an amazing job in the face of many obstacles. She did not have access to Virginia's diaries (or) Leonard's papers..."

A 1965 discussion of Virginia Woolf in the Kwansei Gakuin University Annual Studies publication presented the writer's contention that "perhaps, and naturally enough, women critics are more sympathetic with Virginia Woolf as feminist", opining that "many pages of Aileen Pippett's biography" were written with reference to feminism. The writer and performer Angna Enters, feeling Virginia Woolf a kindred spirit as a "sensitive writer", with "similarities between the way the two women lived and worked... choosing to remain childless, both (maintaining) disciplined work habits amid environments often disordered", used The Moth and the Star as the basis for her exploration of Woolf's life.

== Personal life ==
Aileen Side married firstly, in 1918, William Harry Brice Mears (1888-1965), MBE, of Pyrford, Surrey, a chartered accountant and Grade 3 official of the Ministry of Labour and National Service. Her second husband, Roger Samuel Pippett (1895-1962), of Wallington, Surrey, was a literary critic, journalist (with the Daily Herald from 1925 to 1938, and on the staff of Picture News, the PM Sunday magazine) and clerk at the Royal Institute of Chemistry who had served with the Friends' Ambulance Unit during the Second World War. They subsequently went to the United States, where they lived on West 8th Street, New York.
