= Derek Stanford =

Derek Stanford may refer to:

- Derek Stanford (writer) (1918–2008), British writer
- Derek Stanford (politician) (born 1970), American politician in the Washington House of Representatives
