= Samuel Robin Spark =

Scottish artist

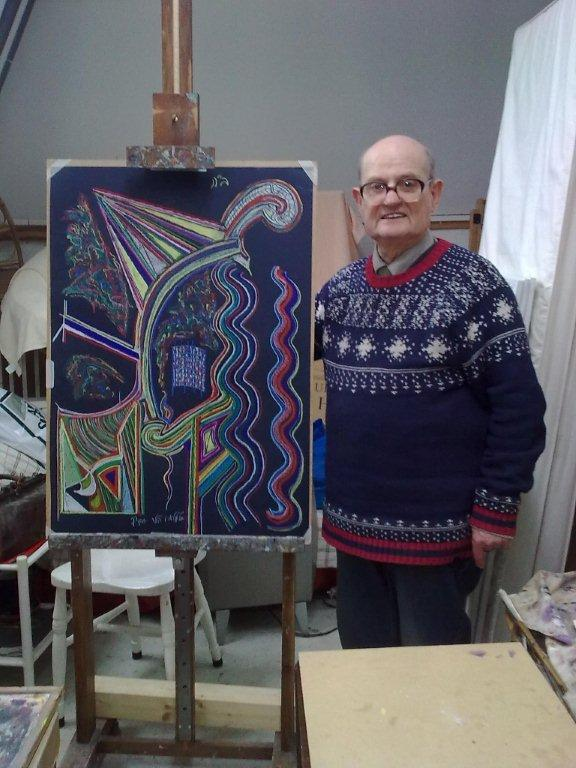
- Samuel Robin Spark in his Edinburgh painting studio in 2015
- Born: Samuel Robin Spark; 9 July 1938; Bulawayo, Southern Rhodesia
- Died: 6 August 2016 (aged 78); Edinburgh, Scotland, UK
- Known for: Painting, drawing, writing
- Movement: Expressive
- Mother: Muriel Spark (née Camberg)

Samuel Robin Spark (9 July 1938 – 6 August 2016) was a Scottish artist. He was the son of Sidney Oswald Spark and writer Muriel Spark.

Prolific in his work, he created more than 1,000 paintings, photographs, and short texts and articles about art, Jewish culture, and his family.

== Early life ==
Spark was born in Southern Rhodesia, then a British colony, to Sidney and Muriel Spark. His parents had met in Edinburgh at a dance, and his father later travelled to Southern Rhodesia, where he worked as a teacher. Muriel had joined Sidney in 1937, and Robin was born the following July in Bulawayo. The marriage soon deteriorated as Sidney, who was 13 years Muriel's senior, suffered from manic depression and had violent tendencies. Sidney refused to divorce Muriel, so Muriel left him, taking Robin with her. They moved first to Cape Town, living in a flat below Princess Frederica of Greece and the young Constantine.

In 1944, towards the end of WW2, Muriel returned to the UK by means of a troopship, but was unable to secure passage for the six-year-old Robin, who was left in the care of convent nuns in Central Africa. In September 1945, Muriel brought Robin to Edinburgh. She then went to London to seek work, leaving Robin to be raised by Muriel's parents, the Cambergs, in their flat in Morningside/Bruntsfield.

Muriel Spark converted to Catholicism in 1954, but Robin chose to remain loyal to Judaism, much to his grandparents' satisfaction. Muriel did not attend his Bar Mitzvah in 1952, but sent 50 pounds for the party afterwards.

== Education and careers ==
Robin was educated at the private Daniel Stewart's College in Edinburgh. He left at age 16 to pursue a career in the retail jewellery trade. He served his National Service in the Royal Army Medical Corps from 1957 to 1959, after which he studied at night school in order to obtain his Highers. In the late 1960s, he entered the Civil Service, in which he worked for 20 years in a variety of departments, ending as chief clerk to the Scottish Law Commission.

Despite never having studied art, Spark always had an interest in the subject, and he became convinced that he had to pursue a career in it. Udi Merioz, an international artist who was a friend of Robin, encouraged him to try to get into a college, so he started to attend evening classes at the art college and prepared a portfolio for entrance as a full-time student. He was offered a place at the Edinburgh College of Art and started the four-year course in 1983, graduating with a BA (Hons). He then was awarded an Andrew Grant Scholarship and became an art tutor while continuing his painting.

In 1989, Spark was awarded an Israel Zangwill scholarship.

== Solo exhibitions ==
- Sternberg Centre for Judaism, London & University Staff Club, Edinburgh
- Richard Demarco Gallery, Edinburgh
- Jewish Festival Exhibition, Edinburgh Hebrew Congregation Community Centre
- Leith A1 Gallery and Marchmont Studios, Edinburgh
- Pen & Ink Miniatures, Kelly's Gallery, Edinburgh
- Peter Potter Gallery, Haddington & Rachel's, Royal Botanic Gardens, Edinburgh International Festival
- The Brass Rail & La Grande Cafetier, Edinburgh
- Dunedin Gallery, Edinburgh
- Creelers, Edinburgh
- Lyceum Theatre, Edinburgh
- Leo Beck center London
- W.A.S.P.S., Studios Patriothall Gallery

== Works shown ==
Royal Academy, Royal Scottish Academy, Heriot-Watt University, The Chantry, Co. Wexford, City of Aberdeen Art Gallery, Blue & White Gallery & Associates, Jerusalem, Florida, Buenos Aires, Royal Scottish Society of Painters in Watercolours, Edinburgh Printmakers' workshop, Morrison Award, Hebrew Society of Argentina sparing 1992 Art Exhibition, Society of Scottish Artists, WASPS.

== Permanent collections ==
- Heriot-Watt University
- Sternberg Centre
- Edinburgh College of Art
- Edinburgh Hebrew Congregation
- National Portrait Gallery of Scotland
- Blue & White Gallery
- St. Mary's Music School in Edinburgh

== Tutorial career ==
- Blue & White Gallery, Jerusalem
- Marchmont Studio and Gillis Centre Studio, Edinburgh
- Jews Art EJLS, Council for Christians and Jews and Garnet Hill Centre, Glasgow
- Boroughmuir, various schools, and community centres, Edinburgh

== Personal life ==
Spark and his mother Muriel at times had a strained relationship. They had a falling out when Robin's Orthodox Judaism prompted him to petition for his late great-grandmother to be recognized as Jewish. (Muriel's maternal grandparents, Adelaide Hyams and Tom Uezzell, had married in a church. Tom was Anglican. Adelaide's father was Jewish, but her mother was not; Adelaide referred to herself as a "Jewish Gentile.") Muriel reacted by accusing him of seeking publicity to advance his career as an artist. Muriel's brother Philip, who had become actively Jewish, agreed with her version of the family's history. During one of her last book signings in Edinburgh, she told a journalist who asked if she would see her son again: "I think I know how best to avoid him by now."
