= The Comforters =

Novel by Muriel Spark

- First edition
- Author: Muriel Spark
- Cover artist: Victor Reinganum
- Language: English
- Publisher: Macmillan (UK); Lippincott (US)
- Publication date: February 1957 (UK)
- Publication place: United Kingdom
- Media type: Print
- Pages: 232
- OCLC: 1238257

The Comforters is the first novel by Scottish author Muriel Spark. She drew on experiences as a recent convert to Catholicism and having suffered hallucinations due to using Dexedrine, an amphetamine then available over the counter for dieting. Although completed in late 1955, the book was not published until 1957. A mutual friend, novelist Alan Barnsley, had sent the proofs to Evelyn Waugh. At the time Waugh was writing The Ordeal of Gilbert Pinfold, which dealt with his own drug-induced hallucinations.

Waugh's and other positive responses prompted Macmillan to publish the novel in February 1957 in the United Kingdom, and it was also published that same year in the United States. The novel's quick success enabled Spark to give up editorial work and devote herself to full-time creative writing. It has been published in several editions in the United Kingdom and the United States since then.

== Introduction ==
The central character is Caroline Rose, a novelist recently converted to Catholicism. On returning from a retreat, she starts hearing a voice and the sound of a typewriter, which she refers to as the Typewriter Ghost, and which lets her hear the text of the novel she's in. Meanwhile her boyfriend Laurence, who has been staying with his grandmother in Sussex, discovers that the older woman is involved in smuggling, baking diamonds into loaves of bread. The end of the first half of the novel sees her criticising the plot, which leads to the narrator pettily causing her car to crash, after which the narrator tries to deal with her criticisms.

As Muriel Spark recounts in her memoir Curriculum Vitae, the title is taken from the Biblical story "The comforters of Job." Spark, a Catholic convert, had recently taken instruction and believed that the Comforters were really demons whose intention was to pour salt into Job's wounds.

The idea for the plot came to Spark after a serious mental breakdown, during which she believed that there were secret word game style codes in the poems of TS Eliot. She became so convinced by this that she would spend night after night encoding.

She finally became better as a result of improved nutrition (she had been chronically malnourished) and a rest cure funded by a number of writers, including Graham Greene. TS Eliot was also moved to write her a letter, reassuring her that there were no such codes in his work.

== Reception ==
A friend of Spark's sent her novel to Evelyn Waugh and Graham Greene, who both were positive. Their responses helped gain publication by Macmillan. Others also praised it. Waugh wrote, "The first half, up to the motor accident, is brilliant. The second half rather diffuse. The mechanics of the hallucinations are well managed. These particularly interested me as I am myself engaged on a similar subject [The Ordeal of Gilbert Pinfold]. Mrs Spark no doubt wants a phrase to quote on the wrapper and advertisements. She can report me as saying: 'brilliantly original and fascinating'." Greene wrote, "One of the few really original first novels one has read for many years."

Published in the United Kingdom (UK) in 1957, the novel quickly became a commercial success. It was published the same year in the United States (US). In 1963 and 1965, respectively, it was published in paperback in the two countries. New editions were published in 1978 in the UK and in 1984 in the US, as well as later in the century and in the 2000s.

In 2009 Spark was described by the author Ali Smith as post-modern, speculating in this novel "about the act of making things, and people, up, about how and why we make narrative, and about the 'kind of truth' that emerges from fiction."
