= Robinson (novel) =

1958 novel by Muriel Spark

First edition Cover art by Victor Reinganum

Robinson is the second novel by Muriel Spark, first published by Macmillan in 1958 and in the US by Lippincott, and is unusual within her body of work in being written in the first person. The novel is set in 1954 and begins with 29 people on a plane bound for Azores and then Lisbon that crashes on a remote island in the North Atlantic, killing all the crew and most of the passengers. The narrator, January Marlow, and two other survivors, are nursed by Robinson, a mysterious loner already in residence on the island. As the novel progresses, their physical health returns, but the mental health of the characters is tested by the extreme circumstances. For rescue, they await the coming of the boat that will collect the pomegranate crop, the first contact with civilisation since their disappearance. A young boy called Miguel and a cat called Bluebell flesh out the cast list.

The novel features typical Spark themes, such as Catholicism, dramatic accidents, guns, a small group of individuals united by a common theme, and a budding writer. The book belongs in a long English tradition of desert island stories, and it evokes Shakespeare's The Tempest, as well as novels from Daniel Defoe's own Robinson Crusoe, to Treasure Island and Swiss Family Robinson. It can also be seen in relation to its immediate predecessor, Lord of the Flies (1954), in considering civilisation from the vantage point of a setting where customary rules break down. It has also been suggested that January's surname, Marlow, connects the book to Conrad's Heart of Darkness. Bryan Cheyette has argued that Robinson is a good example of Spark's evocation of a 'distinctly female spirituality', and that the novel is 'closely related to Spark's own experiences in the late 1940s and mid-1950s'. Alan Bold has pointed out in his work on Spark that the novel has caused interpretive conflict, with one English critic terming it 'the most obscure and the least successful of her novels', and another finding it somewhat dismissively a 'witty theological parable'. However, a recent study has argued that Robinson is more of an achievement, and 'artfully reflects the diminishment of postwar Britain's national imperial status'.
