= Loitering with Intent =

Loitering with Intent may refer to:

- Loitering with Intent (novel), a 1981 novel by Muriel Spark
- Loitering with Intent (film), 2014 American comedy film
- Loitering with Intent: The Child (1992) and Loitering with Intent: The Apprentice (1997), the two volumes of Peter O'Toole's autobiography
- The criminal offence of loitering, as defined in English law by the Penal Servitude Act 1891
