= Ben Avram =

Indian artist and painter (born 1941)

Ben Avram in 2006

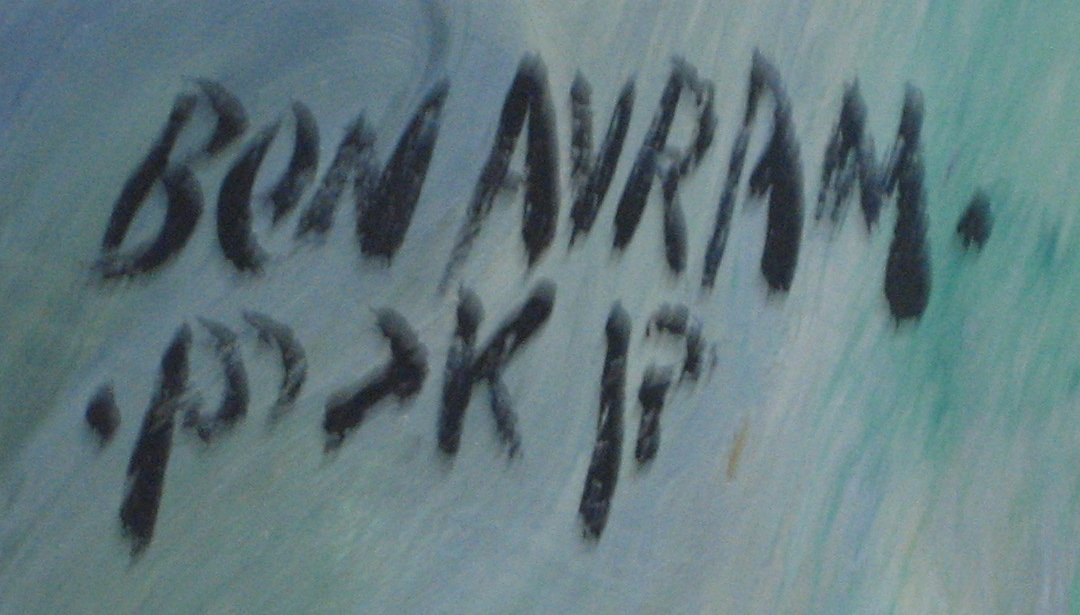
Example of Ben Avram's signature

The Twelve Tribes, oil on canvas painting by Ben Avram

Edward Philips, Ben Avram (Hebrew: בן אברם; born 1941) is an artist who was born in Bombay, India and immigrated to Israel as a teenager. He graduated from the Bezalel Academy of Art and Design in 1965 and continues to call Jerusalem his home.

Most of Ben Avram's oil paintings and watercolors portrays Israeli cities, religious festivals, and Bible stories. He paints in creamy sensual tones incorporating symbols such as doves, a menorah, and Shabbat candles.

== Exhibitions ==
- 1964 Group exhibitions in the United States and Canada
- 1977 Safrai Gallery, Jerusalem
- 1981–1986 Artexpo, New York City
- 1981–1986 Artexpo, Los Angeles
- 2001–current Blue and White Art Gallery, Jerusalem

== Auction record ==
The auction record for a painting by Ben Avram is $6,875. This record was set by The Twelve Tribes, a 47.24 by 31.5 inch oil painting on canvas sold 28 December 2010 at Matsa for Public Auctions-Matsa Gallery (Tel Aviv).

== See also ==
- Visual arts in Israel
