= Nasty Habits (film) =

1977 film by Michael Lindsay-Hogg

- US theatrical release poster
- Directed by: Michael Lindsay-Hogg
- Screenplay by: Robert Enders
- Based on: The Abbess of Crewe by Muriel Spark
- Produced by: Robert Enders
- Starring: Glenda Jackson; Melina Mercouri; Geraldine Page; Sandy Dennis; Anne Jackson; Anne Meara; Susan Penhaligon; Edith Evans; Jerry Stiller; Rip Torn; Eli Wallach
- Cinematography: Douglas Slocombe
- Edited by: Peter Tanner
- Music by: John Cameron
- Production company: Bowden Productions Limited
- Distributed by: Scotia-Barber (United Kingdom); Brut Productions (United States)
- Release date: 18 March 1977 (New York City)
- Running time: 96 minutes
- Countries: United Kingdom; United States
- Language: English

Nasty Habits is a 1977 comedy film directed by Michael Lindsay-Hogg, starring Glenda Jackson, Melina Mercouri, Geraldine Page, Sandy Dennis, Anne Jackson, Anne Meara and Susan Penhaligon. The screenplay by Robert Enders is based on the 1974 novella The Abbess of Crewe by Muriel Spark.

== Plot ==
At the little-known and extremely wealthy Abbey of Philadelphia, the Abbess, Sister Hildegard, is dying. She wishes her favorite, Sister Alexandra, to succeed her but dies moments before she can make her endorsement public. Alexandra conspires with Sisters Gertrude and Walburga to win the coming election against her rival, Sister Felicity, who is openly carrying on an affair with a Jesuit priest, Father Thomas. Alexandra orders hidden microphones and cameras installed throughout the convent, and even hires a pair of Jesuit students, Gregory and Ambrose, to break in and steal Thomas's compromising letters from Sister Felicity's sewing box. The break-in is discovered, but the real meaning is kept hidden and Alexandra wins the election by a landslide. Once she is made Abbess, Alexandra expels and excommunicates Felicity, who begins a very public campaign to topple Alexandra. At the same time, the publicity brings the abbey to the attention of the Holy See, which discovers that the order is an unofficial one, with no actual ties to the Roman Catholic Church. To make matters worse, Gregory and Ambrose blackmail Gertrude and Walburga, who send the bungling Sister Winifred to pay them off only to have the whole scandal made public.

== Cast ==
- Glenda Jackson as Sister Alexandra
- Melina Mercouri as Sister Gertrude
- Geraldine Page as Sister Prioress Walburga
- Sandy Dennis as Sister Winifred
- Anne Jackson as Sister Mildred, Mistress of Novices
- Anne Meara as Sister Geraldine
- Susan Penhaligon as Sister Felicity
- Edith Evans as Sister Hildegard
- Jerry Stiller as P.R. Priest
- Rip Torn as Father Maximilian
- Eli Wallach as Monsignor
- Harry Ditson as Ambrose
- Christopher Muncke as Gregory
- Anthony Forrest as Father Thomas
- Mike Douglas, Bill Jorgensen, Jessica Savitch, and Howard K. Smith as themselves

== Parallels to the Watergate conspiracy ==
The film and the original novel were a satire on the presidency of Richard Nixon and the Watergate scandal, including Alexandra's parting line as she boards a plane to Rome to answer charges from the Vatican. The characters are parallels of the Nixon cabinet and Watergate conspirators.

- Sister Alexandra – Richard Nixon
- Sister Gertrude – Henry Kissinger
- Sister Prioress Walburga – H. R. Haldeman
- Sister Winifred – John Dean
- Sister Mildred, Mistress of Novices – John Ehrlichman
- Sister Geraldine – Gerald Ford
- Ambrose – E. Howard Hunt
- Gregory – G. Gordon Liddy

== Reception ==
On the review aggregator website Rotten Tomatoes, the film holds an approval rating of 40% based on 5 reviews, with an average rating of 7.5/10. Vincent Canby in The New York Times wrote that Glenda Jackson had her best role in years, and that the film was "very funny" but was too uneven to be ultimately successful.

The film was released on VHS in 1989 and on DVD in 2014.
