= The Ballad of Peckham Rye =

1960 novel by Muriel Spark

- First edition cover'
- Author: Muriel Spark
- Cover artist: Victor Reinganum
- Language: English
- Publisher: Macmillan
- Publication date: December 1960
- Publication place: United Kingdom
- Media type: Print (Hardback & Paperback)
- ISBN: 0-333-03233-0
- OCLC: 219982875

The Ballad of Peckham Rye is a novel written in 1960 by the British author Muriel Spark.

It tells the story of a devilish Scottish migrant, Dougal Douglas, who moves to Peckham in London and wreaks havoc amongst the lives of the inhabitants. The text draws upon the supernatural, as well as issues of Irish and Scottish migrancy and offers a critique of the sterile and unremarkable nature of the lives of the Peckham working class.

== Plot summary ==
The novel begins with the telling of Humphrey Place saying "No" at the altar where he was due to marry Dixie Morse. Humphrey's immoral behaviour is assumed to be a result of his recent association with Dougal Douglas, a Scottish migrant who has since left the area of Peckham.

Spark goes on to tell us the entire story of what exactly happened during Dougal's residence in Peckham. From his inaugural meeting with Mr V. R. Druce, head of nylon textiles manufacturers Meadows, Meade & Grindley, we learn that Dougal is employed to bridge the gap between industry and the arts. He befriends employees Merle Coverdale (who is in fact indulging in an unromantic, immoral affair with the married Mr Druce) and Elaine Kent, an "experienced controller of process", as well as Humphrey Place, a refrigerator engineer.

After finding lodgings with Miss Belle Frierne (where Humphrey Place also resides), and splitting up with his fiancé Jinny due to her being ill (his "fatal flaw" is that he cannot bear anyone who is ill), Dougal embarks upon a mission of disruption throughout Peckham. Throughout this he falls foul of typist Dixie Morse and electrician Trevor Lomas and becomes the target of a gang consisting of Trevor, Collie Gould and Leslie Crewe.

Throughout his stay in Peckham, Dougal carries out "human research" on the "moral character" of the people of the area. As well as working for Meadows, Meade & Grindley, he also works for their rivals, the more prosperous Drover Willis's textile manufacturers (under the pseudonym Douglas Dougal), as well as working as a ghost writer for the retired actress and singer Maria Cheeseman. Only Nelly Mahone recognises Dougal for the manipulative "double-tongued" rogue he is, but no one listens to her as everyone views her as a drunken Irish vagrant.

The culmination of Dougal's antics results in his landlady Miss Frierne having a stroke, Mr Druce killing his mistress Merle Coverdale by stabbing her in the neck with a corkscrew, and the rejection of marriage to Dixie Morse at the altar by Humphrey Place. In the penultimate chapter Dougal attacks Trevor and, despite injury, Dougal manages to leave Peckham. The novel ends with the marriage of Humphrey Place and Dixie Morse, two months after the original, aborted wedding. The final scene shows Peckham in a state of transcendence, not shown anywhere else in the novel, and is seen as a transfiguration of the commonplace world.

== Characters in "The Ballad of Peckham Rye" ==
Dougal Douglas
is the protagonist of The Ballad of Peckham Rye, although he does not appear until the second chapter. He is a Scottish migrant, yet there is no mention of his background other than that he is an Arts man, and he is often mistaken by the Peckham locals as an Irishman. He causes mayhem in Peckham and manipulates the other characters, as well as exploring the history of the city and its social and archaeological constructs, which are all a part of his "human research".

One of his most noticeable character traits is his association with the devil. He is also deformed, as one of his shoulders is higher than the other. Throughout the novel he is described as being an "angel-devil" and a "succubus". He asks various people to feel his head where there are two lumps, apparently where his horns have been surgically removed. However, at certain points of the novel he alludes to the idea of not being able to cross water, suggesting that he may be more aligned with witchcraft rather than the devil. Elsewhere he boasts about having powers of exorcism and at one point admits he is not the devil, but "one of the wicked spirits that wanders through the world for the ruin of souls".

== Critical Opinions ==
Author William Boyd argues that The Ballad of Peckham Rye, which appeared in paperback in 1963, was overshadowed by The Prime of Miss Jean Brodie, Spark's next novel, widely considered her greatest work. Boyd argues that, at a time when many other novelists were using the first person, Spark "hovers above her fictional world like a Dickens or a Trollope, happily telling us first what this character is thinking, then that one". Boyd also argues that the book is not an example of "magical realism".
