= Symposium (novel) =

Novel by Muriel Spark

- First edition
- Author: Muriel Spark
- Cover artist: Susan Sluglett
- Language: English
- Publisher: Constable (UK); Houghton Mifflin (US)
- Publication date: 1990
- Publication place: United Kingdom
- Media type: Print & Audio
- Pages: 192
- ISBN: 0-09-469660-8

Symposium is a novel by Scottish author Muriel Spark, published in 1990. John Mortimer, writing in The Sunday Times, regarded it as one of the best novels of that year.

== Plot introduction ==
It is the story of a dinner party and the events leading up to it involving the lives of the five couples attending:

- Hurley Reed (an American painter) and Chris Donovan (a rich Australian widow), the party hosts
- Lord and Lady Suzy, who have recently been burgled
- Ernst and Ella Untzinger, an EU commissioner and his wife, a teacher
- Margaret and William Damien, newlyweds just returned from a honeymoon in Venice
- Annabel Treece and Roland Sykes, a TV producer and genealogist, cousins

The story includes many flashbacks into the lives of the guests including a convent of Marxist nuns, a burglary ring preying on the guests, a mad Scottish uncle and several unexplained deaths. The dinner party itself ends with the murder of the mother of one of the guests.

== Reception ==
- Symposium was applauded by Time Magazine for the "sinister elegance" of Muriel Spark's "medium of light but lethal comedy."
- 'Symposium is put together like an intricate jigsaw...It is extremely clever and highly entertaining' - Penelope Lively
- 'Stiletto-sharp fiction...it is the dialogue that propels this dangerous, devilish book' - Scotland on Sunday
