= Derek Stanford (writer) =

British writer (1918–2008)

Derek Stanford FRSL
- Born: 11 October 1918
- Died: 19 December 2008 (aged 90); Brighton, England
- Education: Latymer Upper School
- Occupation: Writer
- Spouse: Julie Whitby

Derek Stanford FRSL (11 October 1918 – 19 December 2008) was a British writer, known as a biographer, essayist and poet.

Educated at Upper Latymer School, Hammersmith, London, he was a conscientious objector during World War II, serving in the Non-Combatant Corps. He edited Resistance, a poetry magazine of just one issue, with David West in 1946.

For a period in the early 1950s he worked with Muriel Spark on several books, and was a supporter of hers (together with the eccentric poet Hugo Manning, a long-time friend), in the Poetry Society. Stanford described Spark's ousting in Inside the Forties.

Spark convinced him of the talent of Dylan Thomas, and Stanford wrote an early book on Thomas shortly after his death. He is associated with the character Hector Bartlett in Muriel Spark's A Far Cry from Kensington (1988).

Stanford died in 2008, aged 90, in Brighton. His widow is the poet Julie Whitby.

== Works ==
- A Romantic Miscellany (1946) editor with John Bayliss
- The Freedom of Poetry: Studies in Contemporary Verse (1947)
- Music for Statues (1948)
- Tribute to Wordsworth: A Miscellany of Opinion for the Centenary of the Poet's Death (1950) editor with Muriel Spark
- Christopher Fry: An Appreciation (1951)
- Christopher Fry Album (1952)
- Emily Brontë: her life and work (1953) with Muriel Spark
- My Best Mary (letters of Mary Wollstonecraft Shelley) (1953) editor with Muriel Spark
- Dylan Thomas: a literary study (1954)
- Letters of John Henry Newman (1957) editor with Muriel Spark
- Fenelon's Letters to Men and Women (1957) editor
- Anne Brontë: Her Life And Work (1959) with Ada Harrison
- John Betjeman – A Study (1961)
- Muriel Spark: a Biographical and Critical Study (1963)
- Concealment and Revelation in T. S. Eliot (1965)
- Poets of the 'Nineties. A Biographical Anthology (1965)
- Prose of the Century (1966)
- The Body Of Love: An Anthology of Erotic Verse from Chaucer to Lawrence (1966) editor
- Aubrey Beardsley's Erotic Universe (1967)
- Short Stories of the 'Nineties: A Biographical Anthology (1968) editor
- Movements in English poetry, 1900–1958 (1969)
- Stephen Spender, Louis MacNeice, Cecil Day-Lewis: a critical essay (1969)
- Critics of the 'Nineties (1970)
- Writing of the 'Nineties: From Wilde to Beerbohm (1971)
- Pre-Raphaelite Writing (1973) editor
- Three Poets of the Rhymers Club: Ernest Dowson, Lionel Johnson, John Davidson (1974)
- Inside the Forties: literary memoirs, 1937–1957 (1977)
- The Memorare Sequence (1977)
- The Weather Within (1978)
- The Traveller Hears the Strange Machine: Selected Poems 1946–1979 (1980)
- The Vision and Death of Aubrey Beardsley (1985)
