= Not To Disturb =

- First edition
- Author: Muriel Spark
- Language: English
- Publication date: 1971

Not To Disturb is a novella by the British author Muriel Spark. It was first published in 1971 by Macmillan.

The story is derived from a press report.

== Plot summary ==
A storm rages round the towers of the big house near Geneva. Behind the locked doors of the library, the Baron, the Baroness and their handsome young secretary are not to be disturbed. In the attic, the Baron's lunatic brother howls and hurls plates at his keeper. But in the staff quarters, all is under control. Under the personal supervision of Lister, the Baron's incomparable butler, the servants make their own, highly lucrative, preparations for the tragedy. The night is long, but morning will bring a *crime passionnel* of outstanding attraction and endless possibilities. (Note: Description from back cover of 1974 UK Penguin edition.)

The Baron, Baroness and one of their secretaries lock themselves in the library, giving strict instructions not to be disturbed. It is implied the secretary has had sexual relationships with both the Baron and Baroness. The servants speak as if they are already dead, and make preparations to sell the story to the press. One of the servants, Heloise, is pregnant, and is married to the Baron's mad brother by the local vicar. In the morning, the police are called and they break down the door to the library. The Baron has shot the Baroness and the secretary, then himself, according to a note he has apparently left. The Baron's mad brother and Heloise inherit the estate, and the servants retain their jobs.

== Reception ==
A review in The New York Times noted:

"[Muriel Spark's] new novel is an agile send-up of different kinds of popular fiction: detective stories, the Jeeves novels, and realistic tales about the servant problem. Read with these parallels in mind, Not to Disturb offers fresh laughter and acerbic insight into conventional ways of writing about the hypocrisies of master-servant relationships. Occasionally, the parody extends to other Gothic novels. ... Not to Disturb has the cleverness to entertain and the intelligence to provoke thought; but, finally, its philosophical mysteries look suspiciously like pretenses, and the book leaves the annoying as well as the stimulating after-effects of legerdemain."

The book drew comparisons to Ivy Compton-Burnett, Henry Green and Ronald Firbank. Martin Stannard, Spark's biographer, records that "Too many of the London reviews of Not To Disturb had been disappointing", and that in America it had had an "indifferent reception".
