= The Abbess of Crewe =

1974 Catholic novella

- First edition (publ. Macmillan); Cover art by Linnet Gotch
- Author: Muriel Spark
- Language: English
- Publication date: 1974

The Abbess of Crewe is a novella published in 1974 by Muriel Spark. It is centred on a Catholic convent in Crewe and the political intrigues surrounding the election of a new abbess, after the death of the former. It exhibits Spark's typical style of crossing seamlessly between temporal points in the narrative. Michael Lindsay-Hogg adapted the novel into his film Nasty Habits, released in 1977. This book is considered an allegorical treatment of the Watergate scandal.

== Plot summary ==
At the beginning of the novel we are introduced to Alexandra, recently elected Abbess of Crewe, circumnavigating the issue of electronic bugging in the convent, while there is a visible police presence outside the gates. Alexandra is tall and elegant, 'like a tower of ivory'. She recites modern poetry in place of the traditional vespers and has the nuns given incantations on electronics. It soon becomes clear that there has been a scandal engulfing the convent and that another senior member of the convent, Felicity, formerly Alexandra's rival for the position of Abbess, has departed to live with a Jesuit priest.

The narrative switches to before the election of Abbess, to times soon before and soon after the death of the former abbess, Hildegarde. Most of the humour derives from Alexandra's implacable calm in the face of chaos and her guileful and downright Machiavellian treatment of her rival, Felicity, and the rest of the convent population. This includes the continuation of Hildegarde's video and audio surveillance systems, used to monitor all the nuns' activities, including Felicity's amorous romps in the garden.

== Characters ==
Alexandra, whose mission and calling is to be the next Abbess of Crewe, irrespective of the methods used.

Winifrede, a gullible and manipulable member of Alexandra's inner circle, treated alternately as dogsbody and scapegoat.

Gertrude, a peripatetic nun, only accessible on the telephone at her own convenience. She grants prosaic and indifferent advice to the inner circle and has an apparently godlike awareness of what is said in her absence.

Felicity, Alexandra's only real rival for the position of Abbess. Her political strategy is to form sewing collectives among the nuns and preach free love.

Mildred, one of the two main supporters and co-conspirators of Alexandra.

Walburga, the second of Alexandra's main co-conspirators. Also fully aware of the extent of bugging within the convent.

Baudouin and Maximilian, two Jesuit priests who agree to conspire with Alexandra against Felicity when they are given evidence of her romantic trysts with one of their priests.

== Critical reception ==
Muriel Spark subtitled The Abbess of Crewe - A Modern Morality Tale. According to George Stade's October 20, 1974 review of The Abbess of Crewe in The New York Times, "theological props point to immorality in politics. The setting, to mention names, is the Abbey of Crewe, the immoralities are those of Watergate.", referring to the Watergate scandal of the 1970s. That review concluded "Muriel Spark is the first writer to demonstrate that Watergate and its attendant immoralities are materials not of tragedy, but of farce".

"The short dirk in the hands of Muriel Spark has always been a deadly weapon,... [and] never more so than in The Abbess of Crewe." - The New York Times. "Delicious" - Newsweek. "Here is, of all things, a Watergate book from Muriel Spark. It is funny, stylish, wicked, and delightful, and represents her return to the buoyant and witty precisions of Memento Mori and The Prime of Miss Jean Brodie. Prime Muriel Spark...mad - and hilarious." - The Boston Globe. "Groups of females have always been a congenial subject for her, and the nuns...excite her prose to its pristine piquance...[and] pleasing rigor - stylized, sinister, and soothing." - John Updike, The New Yorker.
