= Territorial Rights =

Novel

- First edition (UK)
- Author: Muriel Spark
- Cover artist: John Alcorn
- Language: English
- Publisher: Macmillan (UK); Coward, McCann & Geoghegan (US)
- Publication date: 1979
- Publication place: United Kingdom
- Media type: Print
- Pages: 240
- ISBN: 0-333-25458-9

Territorial Rights is a novel by the Scottish author Muriel Spark published in 1979.

== Plot introduction ==
Art history student Robert Leaver has fled from his lover, Curran, to Venice to study the Santa Maria Formosa. In Venice, he meets his new love Lina, a Social-realist artist and Bulgarian defector. Lina is searching for the grave of her father Victor, suspected of being involved in the poisoning of King Boris and who was killed by Bulgarian Royalists. Curran follows Robert to Venice and warns him that Lina is being followed by the Bulgarian secret service. Robert also meets his father Arnold, a retired headmaster, who is on holiday with his mistress. Arnold's wife Anthea suspects his affair and has employed the services of a Birmingham detective agency to investigate his infidelities and the agency's Venice operative, Violet de Winter, an old friend of Curran's, is put on the case. Anthea's best friend Grace determines to take a holiday to Venice with her companion Leo to find the truth.

Robert then disappears and a blackmail note is sent to Curren over his and Violet's involvement in Victor's death.

== Reception ==
Edmund White in The New York Times was very positive, writing, "Once in a while a book comes along that is beautifully put together and effortlessly entertaining; Muriel Spark's Territorial Rights is such a novel. To declare it a great book would be to burden it with an ambition it has lightly rejected, but it is the sort of elegant diversion we can enjoy and esteem. It is a hilarious account of political and romantic intrigue in Venice." Kirkus Reviews concludes, "Occasionally hilarious, sometimes poignant (with Robert's mum back in England), but more often merely the ultimate in offbeat charm — a polished yet subdued Spark-ler from a one-of-a-kind talent."

However other reviews were scathing, with Edith Milton in the New York magazine complaining that Spark's characters were "so completely passionless that that one does not for one minute suppose that their sexual and temperamental gyrations could be caused by anything deeper than the demand of the narrative. And those are horrendously complicated, though the plot is not intended to convince...Spark works on this dark landscape with the fever of farce, desperate to keep her plot and characters going...Experimenting with the disease of pettiness, the novel itself finally comes down with a fatal case".

== Publication history ==
- 1979, UK, Macmillan, ISBN 0-333-25458-9, pub date 1979, hardback
- 1979, US, Coward, McCann & Geoghegan, ISBN 0-698-10929-5, pub date May 1979, hardback
- 1980, UK, Panther, ISBN 0-586-05194-5, pub date January 1980, paperback
- 1984, US, Perigee, ISBN 0-399-50930-5, pub date February 1984, paperback
- 1985, US, G K Hall, ISBN 0-8161-9813-6, pub date June 1985, audio cassette
- 1991, UK, Penguin, ISBN 0-14-014557-5, pub date October 1991, paperback
- 1995, US, Chivers, ISBN 0-7451-6300-9, pub date August 1995, audio cassette, read by Nigel Hawthorne
- 2014, UK, Virago, ISBN 1-84408-965-7, pub date March 2014, paperback
- 2014, US, New Directions, ISBN 0-8112-2265-9, pub date May 2014, paperback
