= The Mandelbaum Gate =

1965 novel by Muriel Spark

- First edition
- Author: Muriel Spark
- Language: English
- Publisher: Macmillan (UK); Knopf (US)
- Publication date: 1965
- Publication place: United Kingdom
- Media type: Print & Audio
- Pages: 330
- OCLC: 4019350

The Mandelbaum Gate is a novel written by Scottish author Muriel Spark published in 1965. The title refers to the Mandelbaum Gate in Jerusalem, around which the novel is set.

In 1965, it won the James Tait Black Memorial Prize that year. In 2012, it was shortlisted for the Best of the James Tait Black. It was included in Anthony Burgess's 1984 book Ninety-Nine Novels: The Best in English since 1939 — A Personal Choice.

== Plot introduction ==
The book is set in Jerusalem in 1961 (with the backdrop of the Adolf Eichmann trial). Whilst on a pilgrimage to Holy Land, half Jewish Catholic-convert Barbara Vaughan is planning to meet her fiance Harry Clegg, an archaeologist working in Qumran (where the Dead Sea Scrolls were found). To do this she must pass through the Mandelbaum Gate into Jordanian held Jerusalem; due to her Jewish roots this is a dangerous operation and she enlists the help of Freddy Hamilton, a staid British diplomat and various Arab contacts who may or may not be sympathetic to her cause.
