= The Public Image =

1968 novel by Muriel Spark

- First edition (UK)
- Author: Muriel Spark
- Cover artist: Renate Belina
- Language: English
- Publisher: Macmillan (UK); Knopf (US)
- Publication date: 1968
- Publication place: United Kingdom
- Media type: Print
- Pages: 192
- ISBN: 0-333-09018-7

The Public Image is a novel published in 1968 by Scottish author Muriel Spark and shortlisted for the Booker Prize the following year.

It is set in Rome and concerns Annabel Christopher, an up-and-coming film actress. Annabel carefully cultivates her image to keep her career on course, managing to mask her lack of talent. Her husband Frederick loathes her manipulations and her inexplicable success. He plans his final revenge on her accordingly.

The novel's title was the basis for the name of the post-punk band Public Image Ltd. (PiL) formed by John Lydon after the break up of the Sex Pistols.
