= Reality and Dreams =

1996 novel by Muriel Spark

- First edition
- Author: Muriel Spark
- Cover artist: J. M. W. Turner; Scarlet Sunset; Tate Gallery
- Language: English
- Publisher: Constable (UK); Houghton Mifflin (US)
- Publication date: 1996
- Publication place: United Kingdom
- Media type: Print & audio
- Pages: 160
- ISBN: 0-09-469670-5

Reality and Dreams is a novel by Scottish author Muriel Spark, published in 1996. It was identified by the New York Times Book Review as one of the notable books of 1997.

== Plot introduction ==
The story concerns Tom Richards, a successful British film director and serial womanizer, who has just fallen from a crane whilst shooting his latest film. During his lengthy recuperation he attempts to maintain control of the film, whilst the relationships in his extended family are tested as his daughter Marigold disappears...
