= A Far Cry from Kensington =

1988 novel by Muriel Spark

- First edition (UK)
- Author: Muriel Spark
- Cover artist: Pat Doyle
- Language: English
- Publisher: Constable (UK); Houghton Mifflin (US)
- Publication date: 1988
- Publication place: United Kingdom
- Media type: Print
- Pages: 189
- ISBN: 0-09-468290-9

A Far Cry from Kensington is a novel (and a roman à clef) by British author Muriel Spark, published in 1988.

== Plot introduction ==
Set in 1954, it is narrated by Agnes (known as Nancy) Hawkins; a young war widow lodging in a rooming house in South Kensington and working as an editor at a struggling publishing house. The story centres on Wanda, a highly strung Polish dressmaker who is receiving various threatening letters, and on Hector Bartlett, who appears to be stalking Agnes and through whom she loses her job. "Muriel Spark was trolled in her lifetime by an ex-lover who, by all accounts, was a pretty despicable character. This novel is her revenge on him." The story also features the pseudoscience of radionics.

== Reception ==
Writing in The New York Times, Robert Plunkett declared that A Far Cry from Kensington was Muriel Spark's "most delightful novel in years", writing "the best way to convey the pleasure this novel gives is to compare it to a wonderful old Alec Guinness movie, something along the lines of The Lavender Hill Mob. True, it follows the rules of art right down the line and illuminates the human condition, etc. But it also meets a trickier challenge, that of being superb entertainment."

== Publication history ==
- 1988, UK, Constable, ISBN 0-09-468290-9, published 21 March 1988, hardback
- 1988, US, Houghton Mifflin, ISBN 0-395-47694-1, published July 1988, hardback
- 1988, Canada, Viking, ISBN 0-670-82250-7, hardback
- 1989, UK, Thorndike Press, ISBN 0-89621-231-9, published March 1989, large print (h/b)
- 1989, UK, Penguin, ISBN 0-14-010874-2, published 25 May 1989, paperback
- 1990, US, Avon, ISBN 0-380-70786-1, published January 1990, paperback
- 1990, UK, Chivers, ISBN 0-7451-7187-7, published March 1990, large print (h/b)
- 1991, US, Listening Library, ISBN 0-8072-3186-X, published December 1991, audio cassette, read by Eleanor Bron
- 2000, UK, New Direction, ISBN 0-8112-1457-5, published 10 October 2000, paperback
- 2008, UK, Virago, ISBN 1-84408-527-9, published 1 May 2008, hardback
- 2009, UK, Virago, ISBN 1-84408-551-1, published 5 November 2009, paperback
- 2011, UK, Blackstone, ISBN various, audio CD/cassette/MP3, read by Pamela Garelick
