= The Hothouse by the East River =

1973 novel

- First edition (UK)
- Author: Muriel Spark
- Language: English
- Publisher: Macmillan (UK); Viking (US)
- Publication date: 1973
- Publication place: United States
- Media type: Print
- Pages: 168 (UK) 146 (US)

The Hothouse by the East River is a novel by Scottish author Muriel Spark published in 1973. The main two settings of the novel both reflect the author's life where she lived in Manhattan and where she worked in a POW camp in Britain in World War II.

== Inspiration ==
From a later introduction to the novel Ian Rankin wrote 'As early as 1965, Muriel Spark had a title in mind for a new book. That title was Hothouse East River. The novel itself, however, would not appear until 1973, much changed from its original incarnation, as Spark herself would confide during a 1970 interview with the Guardian newspaper: ‘I’m so interested in the present tense that I’ve redone a book I’ve been working on for three years,The Hot House by the East River, and put it all in the present tense.’ ... the novel she would eventually pen about New York would be one of her strangest, most jarring works, painting an unflattering portrait of the city's wealthier denizens and their spiritually empty lives...'

== Plot ==
Wealthy couple Paul and Elsa live in 1970's Manhattan overlooking the East River with throwbacks to 1944 Britain where they started their relationship. Paul notices that Elsa always has a fixed shadow, and doubts her sanity and her analyst Garven is always on her beck and call. Elsa recognises Kiel, a German ex-POW working at a shoeshop, where she slept with Kiel back in 1944. But Paul believes that Kiel died, in fact there appears to be some question on whether the book's main characters themselves may not be alive...

== Reception ==
At the time Richard P. Brickner writing in The New York Times is positive "Muriel Spark's new novel is, in effect, a witty, mysterious, illuminating dream; Muriel Spark's dream, but more or less ours too. It makes reality barely more fantastic than reality is." he concludes with "A form of resolution takes place at the novel's end, something like acceptance of the past itself; but to describe it would be to flatten it. The book itself eases our own discomfort. The charmingly brutal originality with which the author has laid out her plot of pitfalls shocks us into laughing. And, narrating uncertainty with confidence, she organizes it, and us. Her book is a nightmare that's a good dream."

In 2000, Emma Brockes writing in The Guardian notes "that a bad-tempered review of the novel in 1973 called it "elliptical and dotty". The huffy reviews were possibly provoked by Spark's talent for toying with her readers' expectations. It is an approach she occasionally takes too far: at the end of Hothouse, readers discover with a dizzy plunge that all the protagonists are dead and have been since the opening page. The characters in a Spark novel are held within a symbolic order that is not altogether reliable."
