= The Driver's Seat (novel) =

Novella by Muriel Spark

- First UK edition
- Author: Muriel Spark
- Language: English
- Publisher: Macmillan
- Publication date: 1970
- Publication place: United Kingdom
- Media type: Print (hardback & paperback)
- Pages: 180
- ISBN: 0-333-11525-2
- OCLC: 1148423

The Driver's Seat is a novella by Muriel Spark. Published in 1970, it was advertised as "a metaphysical shocker". It is in the psychological thriller genre, dealing with themes of alienation, isolation and loss of spiritual values.

It was made into a film in 1974 starring Elizabeth Taylor and featuring Andy Warhol. In the U.S the film was renamed Identikit. Spark described it as one of her favourite novels.

The Driver's Seat was, on 26 March 2010, one of six novels to be nominated for “Lost Man Booker Prize” of 1970, "a contest delayed by 40 years because a reshuffling of the fledgeling competition’s rules that year disqualified nearly a year’s worth of high-quality fiction from consideration."

In 2015, it was adapted for the stage by Laurie Sansom for a National Theatre of Scotland production, which premiered at the Royal Lyceum Theatre in Edinburgh.

== Plot summary ==
Lise works in an accountancy firm somewhere in Northern Europe, probably Denmark (the location is not explicitly specified). Spark described The Driver's Seat as a 'whydunnit' (and she uses the term in the novel). This is because in the novel's third chapter it is revealed that Lise will be murdered. Hence Spark's novel is an examination, not of what events take place, but of why they do.

It is eventually revealed that Lise has suffered years of illness; she behaves erratically and often confrontationally, and wears garish clothing. Lise travels to a South European city, probably Rome, ostensibly to meet her illusory boyfriend.

== Dramatisation ==
The Driver's Seat was adapted for the stage by Laurie Sansom and produced by the National Theatre of Scotland at the Lyceum Theatre, Edinburgh and the Tramway, Glasgow in June and July 2015.
