= Loitering with Intent (novel) =

1981 novel by Muriel Spark

- First edition (UK)
- Author: Muriel Spark
- Language: English
- Publisher: Bodley Head (UK); Coward-McCann (US)
- Publication date: 1981
- Publication place: United Kingdom
- Media type: Print & Audio
- Pages: 224
- ISBN: 0-370-30900-6

Loitering with Intent is a novel by Scottish author Muriel Spark. Published in 1981 by The Bodley Head, it was short-listed for the Booker Prize that year. It contains many autobiographical references to Spark's early career and was reprinted in 2001 by New Directions, in the US, and in 2007 by Virago Press in the UK (with a foreword by Mark Lawson).

== Plot introduction ==
In London in 1949/1950, Fleur Talbot is struggling to complete her first novel, Warrender Chase. She manages to secure a job working for Sir Quentin Oliver as secretary to his Autobiographical Association, whose eccentric members intend to write their memoirs. (As is true of other of Spark's novels, there is much play on the inter-relationship of texts, with Newman's Apologia and Cellini's Autobiography constituting Fleur's essential reading.) As Fleur assists the club members she begins to notice that parts of her novel start to occur in real life. She begins to suspect that Sir Quentin may be blackmailing, poisoning or corrupting the association's members. Sir Quentin meanwhile discovers Fleur's novel-in-progress and seeks to suppress it. Fact and fiction intertwine with Sir Quentin's fate matching the fate of the character Warrender Chase.
