= Gabriel Fielding =

English writer (1916–1986)

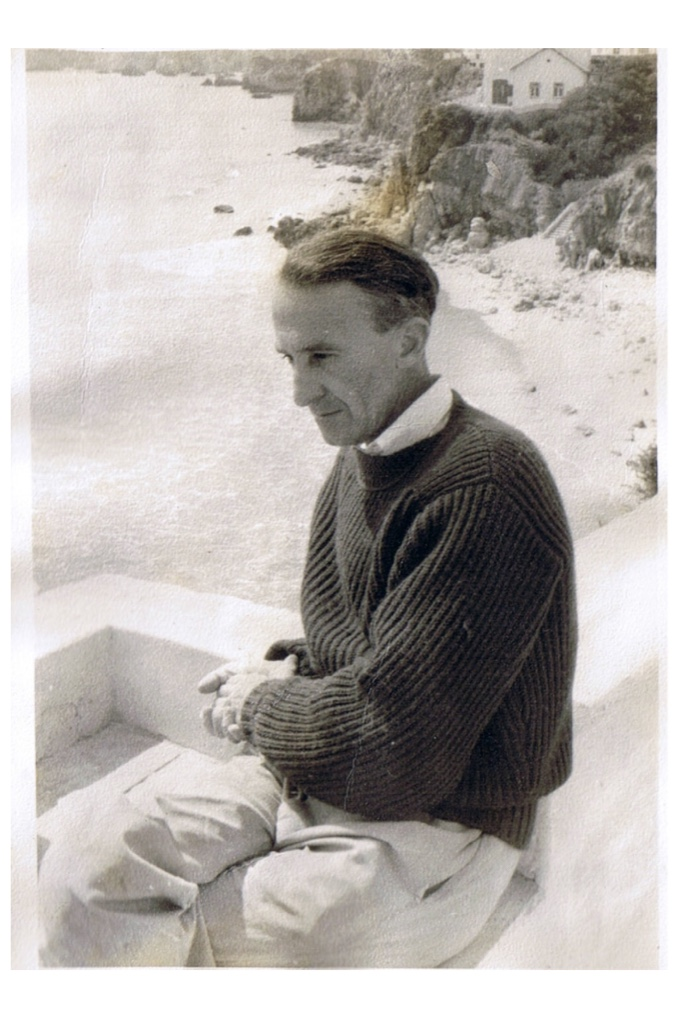
- Fielding c. 1959
- Born: Alan Gabriel Barnsley; 25 March 1916; Hexham, England
- Died: 27 November 1986 (aged 70); Bellevue, Washington, US
- Spouse: Edwina Eleanor Cook

Alan Gabriel Barnsley (pen name Gabriel Fielding, 25 March 1916 – 27 November 1986) was an English novelist whose works include: In the Time of Greenbloom, The Birthday King, Through Streets Broad and Narrow and The Women of Guinea Lane.

== Biography ==
Alan Gabriel Barnsley was born at Hexham, Northumberland, fifth of the six children of Anglican clergyman Rev. George Barnsley (1875–1956) and playwright and whippet-breeder Katherine Mary (née Fielding-Smith), a relative of the novelist Henry Fielding; her father, Rev. Henry Fielding-Smith, descended from Henry Fielding's brother. Barnsley derived his pen name from his illustrious relative.

=== Education ===
From 1925 to 1929, his secondary education started at now Grange School in Eastbourne. From 1929 to 1931, he attended St Edward's School, Oxford. In 1933, he attended Faircourt Academy, Eastbourne. In 1934, he attended Llangefni County School, Anglesey, Wales.

He earned a B.A. from Trinity College, Dublin in 1940, winning prizes in Anatomy and Biology. He wrote and presented a satirical paper on the Irish medical establishment that year, winning him the University Philosophical Society Silver Medal for Oratory in 1939. This paper angered the establishment and made it virtually impossible for him to finish his studies and medical residency in Ireland. The incident is immortalized in his coming-of-age novel Through Streets Broad and Narrow. Fielding graduated M.R.C.S., L.R.C.P. from St. George's Hospital, London in 1942. He was a captain in the Royal Army Medical Corps in World War II. His medical practice included general practice in Maidstone, Kent and part-time practice at HM Prison Maidstone, from 1952 to 1964. Fielding once said, "Medicine, to me, was a sentence I had to fulfill in order to be free to write".

=== Career ===
His first book, The Frog Prince and Other Poems, was published in 1952 in England. He established a bustling medical practice in Maidstone, Kent following World War II, later enlisting two partners to join him. He also served as part-time prison doctor at HM Prison Maidstone He and his wife Edwina became Roman Catholic converts in 1954 under the influence of Father Malacy Lynch, Prior of Aylesford Priory. In 1963 he was awarded the W.H. Smith Award for The Birthday King, and for "the most outstanding contribution to English Literature over a two-year period" (1962–1963). In 1964 he was awarded the Gold Medal of the St. Thomas More Association for The Birthday King. this recognition encouraged him to keep writing while still practicing medicine.

In 1966 he moved to the United States, where he was author-in-residence at Washington State University in Pullman, Washington. He also became a full professor of English literature there, retiring in 1981 as professor emeritus. In 1967 the degree of Doctor of Literature was conferred on him by Gonzaga University, Spokane, Washington. Later he was awarded the Washington State Governor's Writer Award 1972 and Distinguished Professor Washington State University 1981.

He published eight novels, three books of poetry, and numerous short stories. Three of the novels chronicle the life and unsuccessful love affairs of the same protagonist, John Blaydon (In the Time of Greenbloom, Through Streets Broad and Narrow and Brotherly Love), "in a series of brilliant word pictures, evocative, authentic, macabre or hilariously funny."

=== Personal life ===
In 1943, he married Edwina Eleanora Cook. They had five children: Jonathan, Mario Simon, Felicity, Mary Gabriel, and fractal mathematician Michael Barnsley.

Gabriel Fielding died in Bellevue, Washington on 27 November 1986.

== Works ==
=== Poetry ===
- The Frog Prince and Other Poems (1952)
- 28 Poems (1955)

=== Fiction ===
- Brotherly Love (1954) (ISBN 9997512162)
- In the Time of Greenbloom (1956) (ISBN 978-0226248455)
- Eight Days (1958)
- Through Streets Broad and Narrow (1960) (ISBN 0226248445)
- The Birthday King (1962) (ISBN 0451024400)
- Gentlemen in Their Season (1966)
- New Queens for Old – A Novella and Nine Stories (1972) (ISBN 0688000541)
- Pretty Doll Houses (1979) (ISBN 0091367107)
- The Women of Guinea Lane (1986) (ISBN 0091639808)

== Quotes ==
- "It is a matter for grave doubt that Mr. Fielding could write anything from a postcard to a lexicon without perception and grace and brilliance." —Dorothy Parker
- "My advice would be to write -never to stop writing, to keep it up all the time, to be painstaking about it, to write until you begin to write." - Gabriel Fielding
