= Elyada Merioz =

- אליאדה מריוז
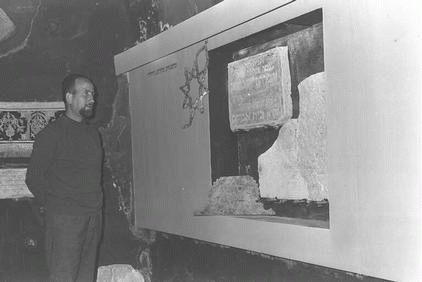
- The first Jew in Old City of Jerusalem
- Born: 1932
- Died: 2004 (aged 71–72)
- Known for: First Jew to settle in the Old City of Jerusalem after the Six-Day War

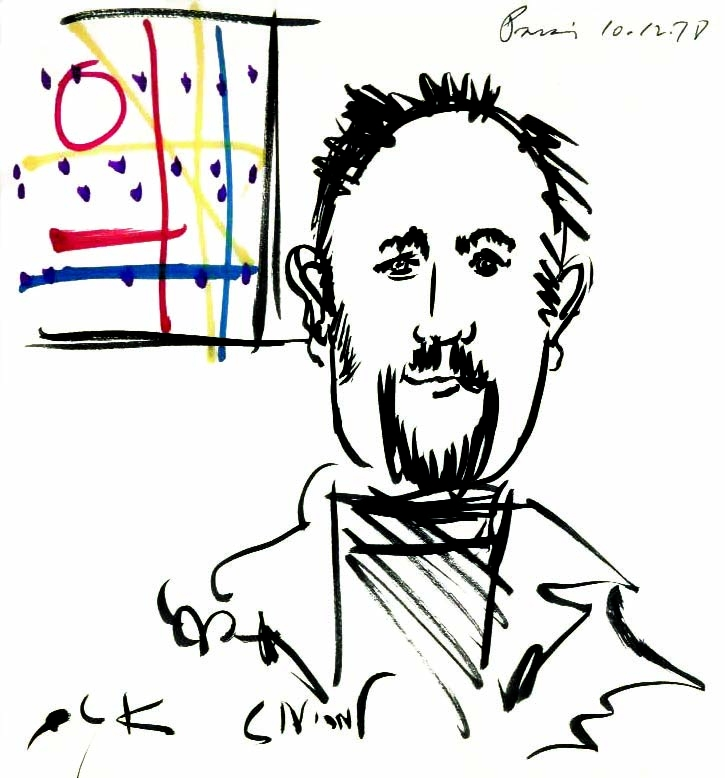
Elyada Merioz as depicted by Yaacov Agam

Elyada Merioz (Hebrew: אליאדה מריוז; 1932–2004) was an Israeli art collector and gallery owner.

== Biography ==
Before the establishment of the state, Elyada Merioz was a member of the Irgun. In 1967, after the Six-Day War, Merioz was the first Jew to settle in the Old City of Jerusalem.

Immediately upon his arrival to the Jewish Quarter, Merioz worked on salvaging the remains of the synagogues bombed by the Jordanians during the war. The remains were displayed at a museum he established on Hayehudim Street #1. Among the most important remains were from the Hurva Synagogue.

Merioz later established the Blue and White Art Gallery, located in the old Roman Cardo in the middle of the Jewish Quarter. The gallery is now run by his son, Udi Merioz.

== See also ==
- Visual arts in Israel
