= Victor Reinganum =

British artist (1907–1995)

- Born: September 13, 1907; London, England
- Died: January 24, 1995 (aged 87)
- Education: Heatherley School of Fine Art, Académie Julian
- Known for: illustration on book dustjackets
- Movement: Surrealism

Victor Reinganum (1907–1995) was a British artist and illustrator, probably best known for his illustrations on book dustjackets, including the first editions of Muriel Spark's The Ballad of Peckham Rye (1960) and The Prime of Miss Jean Brodie (1961).

Reinganum was born in London, England, on 13 September 1907 and died on 24 January 1995, aged 87.

During 1925–1928, Reinganum studied at Heatherley School of Fine Art and the Académie Julian, Paris, also taking private lessons with Léger. In 1928, he joined Elstree Studios and was an art director there until 1929 when he became a freelance illustrator. He was a prolific contributor to the Radio Times, including the cover of at least one Christmas issue. In 1960 he designed the first Radio Times cover to mark the Eurovision Song Contest.

The book Surrealism in England – 1936 and After (1986) says of him:

"Victor Reinganum is Surrealist on the outside or not at all – Born London 1907 – Never a member of any Surrealist group, his work shared a certain terrain with Tunnard, a poetic abstraction on the frontiers of figuration often using biomorphic forms. Originally more known for his illustrations, latterly he has had other works included in retrospective Surrealist shows."
