= Muriel Spark =

Scottish author (1918–2006)

Dame Muriel Spark DBE FRSE FRSL
- Spark in 1960
- Born: Muriel Sarah Camberg; 1 February 1918; Edinburgh, Scotland
- Died: 13 April 2006 (aged 88); Oliveto, Tuscany, Italy
- Resting place: Cemetery of Sant'Andrea Apostolo, Civitella in Val di Chiana
- Education: Heriot-Watt College
- Occupations: Novelist; short story writer; poet; essayist
- Spouse: Sidney Oswald Spark (m. 1937; sep. 1940)
- Children: Samuel Robin Spark
- Writing career
- Language: English
- Notable works: The Prime of Miss Jean Brodie; The Mandelbaum Gate; The Driver's Seat; Memento Mori

Dame Muriel Sarah Spark (née Camberg; 1 February 1918 – 13 April 2006) was a Scottish novelist, short story writer, poet and essayist.

== Life ==
Muriel Camberg was born in the Bruntsfield area of Edinburgh, the daughter of Bernard Camberg, an engineer, and Sarah Elizabeth Maud (née Uezzell). Her father was Jewish, born in Edinburgh of Lithuanian immigrant parents, and her English mother had been raised Anglican. She was educated at James Gillespie's School for Girls (1923–35), where she received some education in the Presbyterian faith. In 1934–35 she took a course in "commercial correspondence and précis writing" at Heriot-Watt College. She taught English for a brief time and then worked as a secretary in a department store.

In 1937 she became engaged to Sidney Oswald Spark, 13 years her senior, whom she had met in Edinburgh. In August of that year, she followed him to Southern Rhodesia (now Zimbabwe), and they were married on 3 September 1937 in Salisbury. Their son Samuel Robin was born in July 1938. Within months she discovered that her husband was manic depressive and prone to violent outbursts. In 1940 Muriel left Sidney and temporarily placed Robin in a convent school, as children were not permitted to travel during the war. Spark returned to Britain in early 1944, taking residence at the Helena Club in London. She worked in intelligence for the remainder of World War II. She provided money at regular intervals to support her son. Spark maintained it was her intention for her family to set up a home in England, but Robin returned to Britain with his father later to be brought up by his maternal grandparents in Scotland.

Between 1955 and 1965 she lived in a bedsit at 13 Baldwin Crescent, Camberwell, south-east London. After living in New York City for some years, she moved to Rome, where she met artist and sculptor Penelope Jardine in 1968. In the early 1970s, they settled in Tuscany, in the village of Oliveto, near to Civitella in Val di Chiana, of which in 2005 Spark was made an honorary citizen. She was the subject of frequent rumours of lesbian relationships from her time in New York onwards, although Spark and her friends denied their validity. She left her entire estate to Jardine, taking measures to ensure that her son received nothing.

Spark died in 2006 and is buried in the cemetery of Sant'Andrea Apostolo in Oliveto.

== Literary career ==
Spark began writing seriously, under her married name, after World War II, beginning with poetry and literary criticism. In 1947 she became editor of the Poetry Review. This position made Spark one of the few female editors of the time. Spark left the Poetry Review in 1948. In 1953 Muriel Spark was baptized in the Church of England but in 1954 she decided to join the Roman Catholic Church, which she considered crucial in her development toward becoming a novelist. She was formally instructed by Dom Ambrose Agius, a Benedictine monk of Ealing Priory, whom she had known from her Poetry Society days, and was received into the Roman Catholic Church on 1 May 1954 by Dom Ambrose. Penelope Fitzgerald, a fellow novelist and contemporary of Spark, wrote that Spark "had pointed out that it wasn't until she became a Roman Catholic ... that she was able to see human existence as a whole, as a novelist needs to do". In an interview with John Tusa on BBC Radio 4, she said of her conversion and its effect on her writing that she "was just a little worried, tentative. Would it be right, would it not be right? Can I write a novel about that – would it be foolish, wouldn't it be? And somehow with my religion – whether one has anything to do with the other, I don't know – but it does seem so, that I just gained confidence." Graham Greene, Gabriel Fielding and Evelyn Waugh supported her in her decision.

Her first novel, The Comforters, was published to great critical acclaim in 1957. It featured several references to Catholicism and conversion to Catholicism, although its main theme revolved around a young woman who becomes aware that she is a character in a novel.

The Prime of Miss Jean Brodie (1961) (Note: The story was published in The New Yorker magazine in 1961, and was first published as a separate novel in 1962.) was even more successful. Spark displayed originality of subject and tone, making extensive use of flashforwards and imagined conversations. It is clear that James Gillespie's High School was the model for the Marcia Blaine School in the novel. Her residence at the Helena Club was the inspiration for the fictional May of Teck Club in The Girls of Slender Means published in 1963.

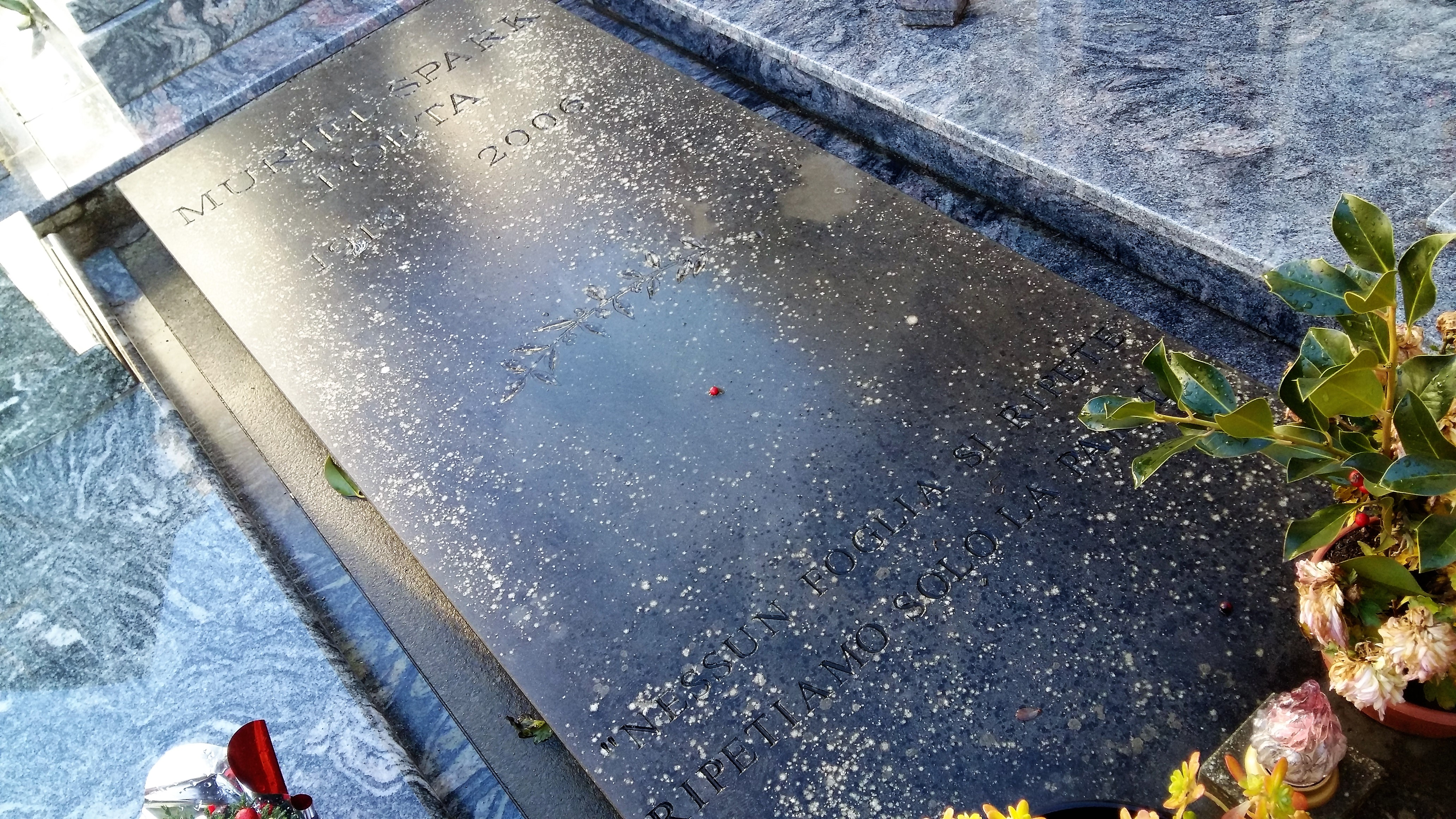
Muriel Spark, Poeta

== Archive and biography ==
In the 1940s Spark began to keep a record of her professional and personal activities that developed into a comprehensive personal archive containing diaries, accounts and cheque books and tens of thousands of letters. Spark used her archive to write her autobiography, Curriculum Vitae, and after its publication in 1992 much of the material was deposited at National Library of Scotland.

Spark refused permission for the publication of a biography of her by Martin Stannard. Penelope Jardine holds publication approval rights, and the book was posthumously published in July 2009. On 27 July 2009 Stannard was interviewed on Front Row, the BBC Radio 4 arts programme. According to A. S. Byatt, "she [Jardine] was very upset by the book and had to spend a lot of time going through it, line by line, to try to make it a little bit fairer".

== Honours and acclaim ==
Spark received the James Tait Black Memorial Prize in 1965 for The Mandelbaum Gate, the Ingersoll Foundation T. S. Eliot Award for Creative Writing in 1992 and the David Cohen Prize in 1997. She became an Officer of the Order of the British Empire in 1967 and Dame Commander of the Order of the British Empire in 1993 for services to literature. She was twice short-listed for the Booker Prize, in 1969 for The Public Image and in 1981 for Loitering with Intent. In 1998, she was awarded the Golden PEN Award by English PEN for a "Lifetime's Distinguished Service to Literature".

Spark received eight honorary doctorates including Doctor of the University degree (Honoris causa) from her alma mater, Heriot-Watt University in 1995; a Doctor of Humane Letters (Honoris causa) from the American University of Paris in 2005; and Honorary Doctor of Letters degrees from the Universities of Aberdeen, Edinburgh, London, Oxford, St Andrews and Strathclyde.

In 2008, The Times ranked Spark as no. 8 in its list of "the 50 greatest British writers since 1945". In 2010, Spark was posthumously shortlisted for the Lost Man Booker Prize of 1970 for The Driver's Seat.

In July 1978, John Lydon of The Sex Pistols officially named his follow up band Public Image Ltd (the "Ltd" was added when the company was incorporated in July 1978), after Muriel Spark’s The Public Image.

== Relationship with her son ==
Spark and her son Samuel Robin Spark had a distant relationship. He was raised by Spark's parents from the age of seven. In 1998, a reporter from The Jewish Chronicle published a story about the ketubah of Spark's parents at the East London Synagogue which would have required both the bride and groom to prove that they are Jewish. The revelation caused Spark to write to The Sunday Telegraph denying that her mother was Jewish and requested that they "please do not falsify my cultural heritage with your bureaucratic fixtures and labels." In a letter to The Scotsman, Robin Spark claimed that he was embarrassed by his mother's letter and described his "conventional Jewish childhood" under his grandparents; he would have been required to undergo conversion if it was proven he was not Jewish. Spark derided her son's claims in an interview with The Observer and considered him to be seeking attention to advance his career as an artist. After hearing that the Chief Rabbi's Marriage Authorisation Office had a certificate that noted her grandmother was Jewish, Spark conceded: "It's quite possible that [grandmother] Adelaide was born a Jew, that I got it wrong."

After the feud, Spark and her son were estranged and barely spoke for the rest of her life. During one of her last book signings in Edinburgh, she told a journalist who asked if she would see her son again: "I think I know how best to avoid him by now."

== Bibliography ==
=== Novels ===
- The Comforters (1957)
- Robinson (1958)
- Memento Mori (1959)
- The Ballad of Peckham Rye (1960)
- The Bachelors (1960)
- The Prime of Miss Jean Brodie (1961)
- The Girls of Slender Means (1963)
- The Mandelbaum Gate (1965)
- The Public Image (1968) – shortlisted for Booker Prize
- The Driver's Seat (1970) – shortlisted for Booker Prize
- Not To Disturb (1971)
- The Hothouse by the East River (1973)
- The Abbess of Crewe (1974)
- The Takeover (1976)
- Territorial Rights (1979)
- Loitering with Intent (1981) – shortlisted for Booker Prize
- The Only Problem (1984)
- A Far Cry from Kensington (1988)
- Symposium (1990)
- Reality and Dreams (1996)
- Aiding and Abetting (2000)
- The Finishing School (2004)

=== Short story collections ===
- The Go-Away Bird and Other Stories (1958)
- Voices at Play (short stories and plays, 1961)
- Collected Stories I (1967)
- Bang-bang You're Dead (1982)
- The Stories of Muriel Spark (1985)
- Open to the Public: New and Collected Stories (1996)
- Complete Short Stories (2001)
- Ghost Stories (2003) — previously collected tales
- The Snobs (2005) — previously collected tales

=== Poetry ===
- The Fanfarlo and Other Verse (1952)
- Collected Poems I (1967)
- Going Up to Sotheby's and Other Poems (1982)
- All the Poems (2004)

=== Other works ===
- Tribute to Wordsworth (edited with Derek Stanford, 1950)
- Child of Light (a study of Mary Shelley) (1951)
- Selected Poems of Emily Brontë (1952)
- John Masefield (biography, 1953)
- Emily Brontë: Her Life and Work (with Derek Stanford; 1953)
- My Best Mary (a selection of letters of Mary Shelley, edited with Derek Stanford, 1953)
- The Brontë letters (1954)
- Letters of John Henry Newman (edited with Derek Stanford, 1957)
- Doctors of Philosophy (play, 1963)
- The Very Fine Clock (children's book, illustrations by Edward Gorey, 1968)
- Mary Shelley (complete revision of Child of Light, 1987)
- Curriculum Vitae (autobiography, 1992)
- The French Window and the Small Telephone (limited edition, 1993)
- The Informed Air: Essays (2014)

=== Critical studies and reviews of Spark's work ===
- Lingard, Joan (1981), review of Loitering with Intent, in Murray, Glen (ed.), Cencrastus No. 6, Autumn 1981, pp. 41 & 42
- Mallon, Thomas (5 April 2010). "Transfigured: how Muriel Spark rose to join the crème de la crème of British fiction". The Critics. Books. The New Yorker. Vol. 86, no. 8. pp. 68–73.
