= Outline of Edinburgh =

Capital city of Scotland

Flag of Edinburgh

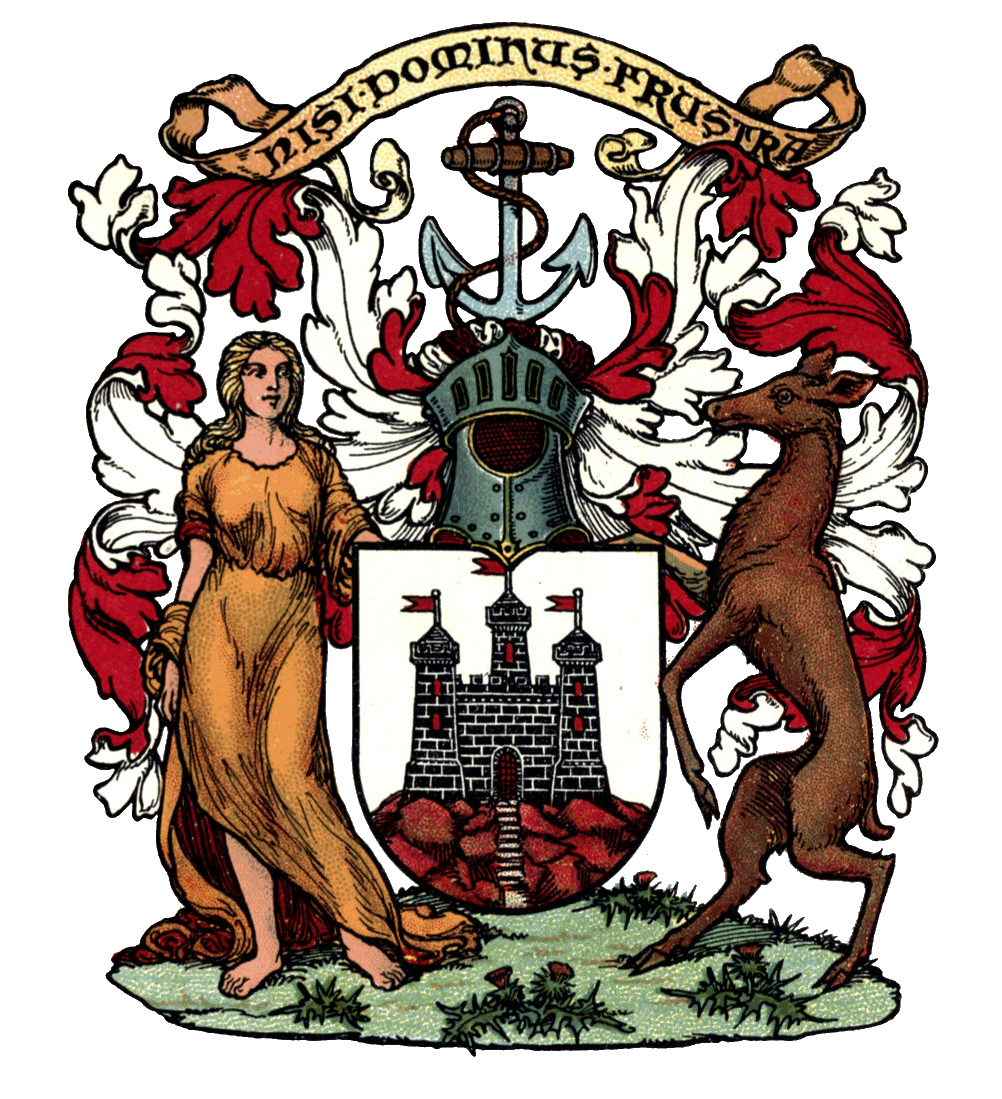
Coat of arms of Edinburgh

The following outline is provided as an overview of and topical guide to Edinburgh:

Edinburgh is the capital city of Scotland and one of its 32 council areas. It is located in southeast Scotland and is bounded to the north by the Firth of Forth and to the south by the Pentland Hills. Edinburgh had a population of 506,520 in 2020, making it the second-most-populous city in Scotland (behind Glasgow) and the seventh-most-populous in the United Kingdom. The wider metropolitan area had a population of 912,490 in the same year.

== General reference ==
- Pronunciation: English: /ˈɛdɪnbərə/ ED-in-bər-ə, Scots: [ˈɛdɪnbʌrə]; Scottish Gaelic: Dùn Èideann [t̪un ˈeːtʲən̪ˠ]
- Common English name(s): Edinburgh
- Official English name(s): Edinburgh
- Adjectival(s): Edinburgensian
- Demonym(s): Edinburger

== Geography of Edinburgh ==
Edinburgh Dùn Èideann
- Location within Scotland
- Coordinates: 55°57′11″N 3°11′20″W

Geography of Edinburgh

- Edinburgh is:
  - a city
    - capital of Scotland
- Population of Edinburgh: 507,170
- Area of Edinburgh: 264 km^{2} (102 sq mi)

=== Location of Edinburgh ===
- Edinburgh is situated within the following regions:
  - Northern Hemisphere and Western Hemisphere
    - Eurasia
      - Europe (outline)
        - Northern Europe
          - United Kingdom (outline)
            - Scotland
- Time zone(s):
  - Greenwich Mean Time (UTC±0)
    - In Summer: British Summer Time (UTC+01)

=== Environment of Edinburgh ===
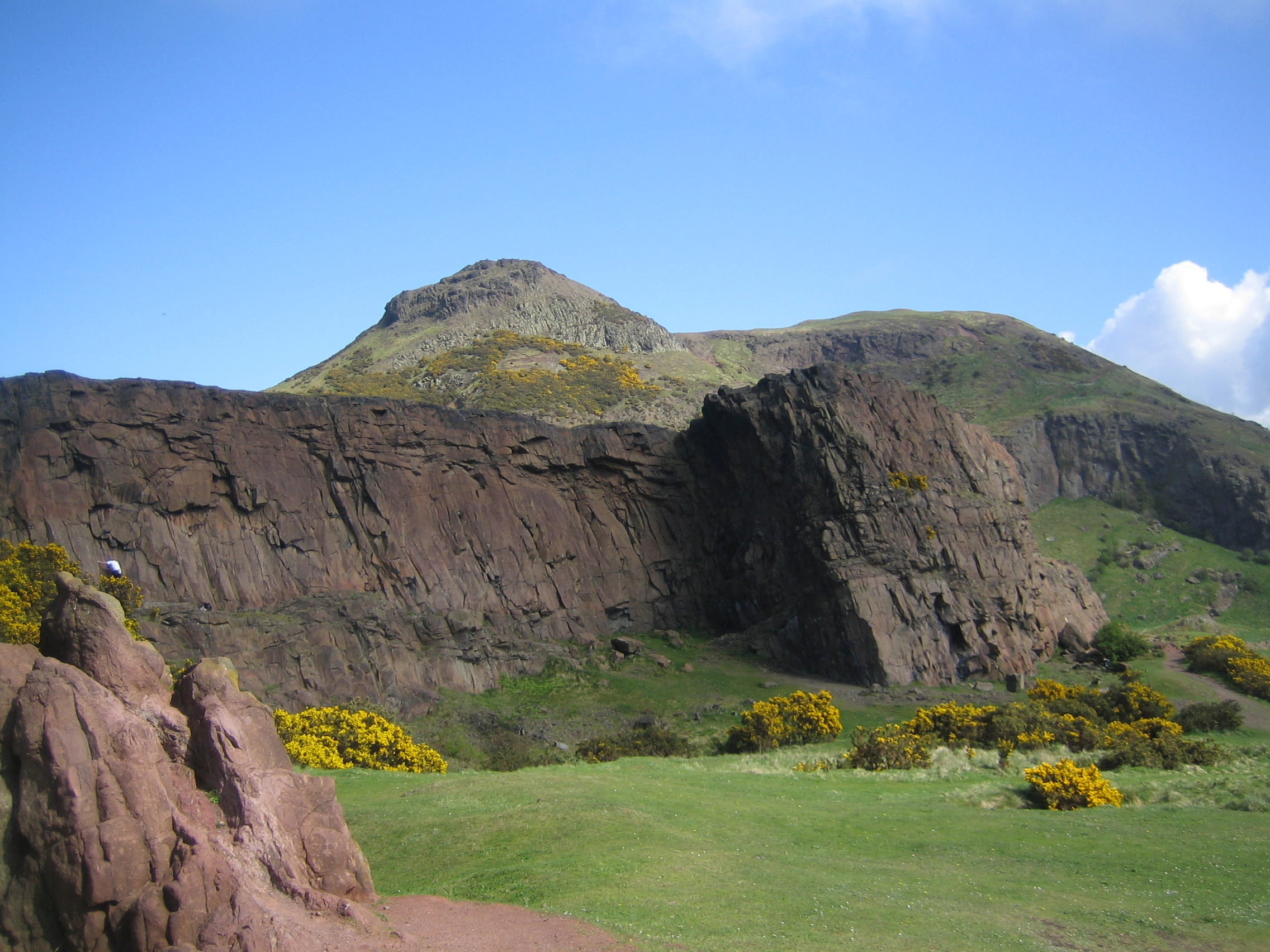
Arthur's Seat

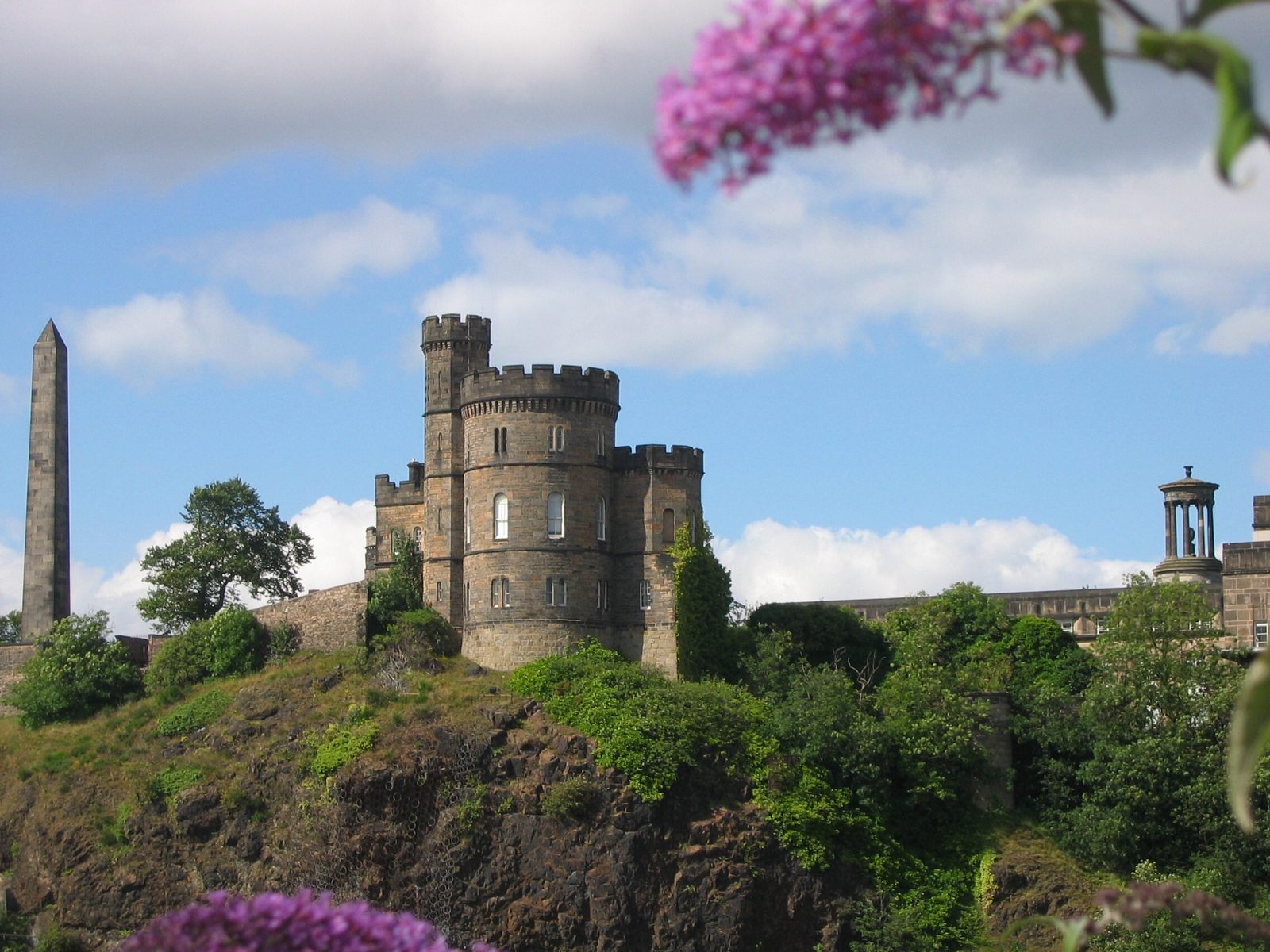
Calton Hill

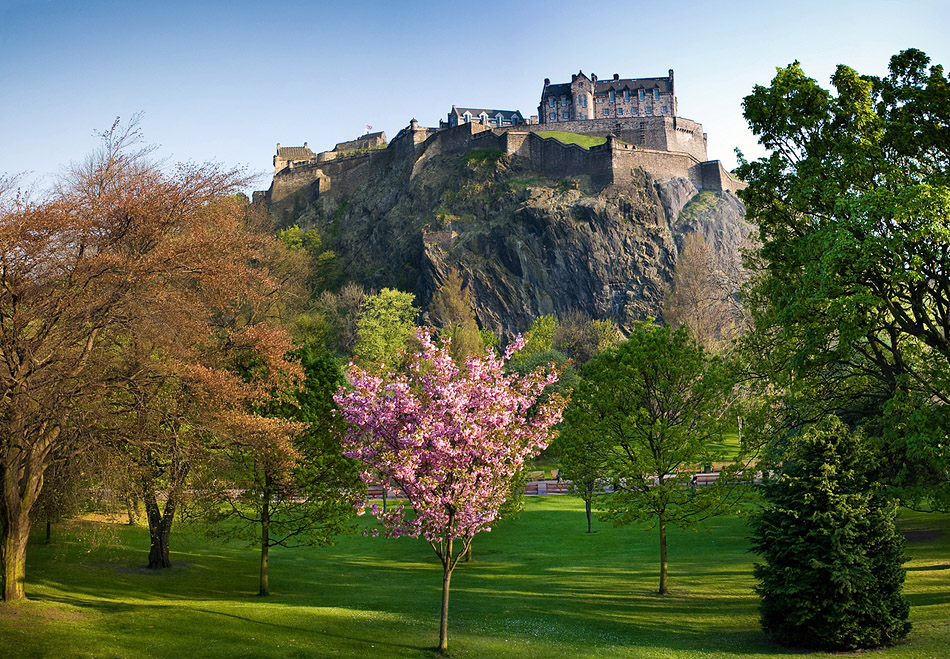
The Castle Rock

- Climate of Edinburgh

==== Natural geographic features of Edinburgh ====
- Canals in Edinburgh
  - Union Canal
- Firths in Edinburgh
  - Firth of Forth
- Hills in Edinburgh
  - Arthur's Seat
  - Blackford Hill
  - Braid Hills
  - Calton Hill
  - Castle Rock
  - Corstorphine Hill
  - Craiglockhart Hill
  - The Mound
  - Pentland Hills
- Islands in Edinburgh
  - Cramond Island
  - Inchmickery
- Lakes in Edinburgh
  - Blackford Pond
  - Duddingston Loch
- Rivers in Edinburgh
  - Braid Burn
  - River Almond
  - Water of Leith

=== Areas of Edinburgh ===
- Abbeyhill
- Alnwickhill
- Ardmillan
- Baberton
- Balerno
- Balgreen
- Bankhead
- Barnton
- Beechmount
- Bingham
- Blackford
- Blackhall
- Bonaly
- Bonnington
- Burghmuirhead
- Braepark
- Broomhouse
- Broughton
- Brunstane
- Bruntsfield
- Bughtlin
- Burdiehouse
- The Calders
- Cameron Toll
- Cammo
- The Canongate
- Canonmills
- Chesser
- Church Hill
- Clermiston
- Colinton
- Comely Bank
- Comiston
- Corstorphine
- Craigcrook
- Craigentinny
- Craigleith
- Craiglockhart
- Craigmillar
- Cramond
- Crewe Toll
- Currie
- Curriehill
- Dalmeny
- Dalry
- Davidson's Mains
- Dean Village
- Drumbrae
- Drylaw
- Duddingston
- Dumbiedykes
- East Craigs
- East Pilton
- Eastfield
- Edinburgh Park
- Fairmilehead
- Ferniehill
- Firrhill
- Forrester
- Fountainbridge
- Gilmerton
- Gogar
- Gogarloch
- Goldenacre
- Gorgie
- The Grange
- Grassmarket
- Granton
- Greenbank
- Greendykes
- Greenhill
- Haymarket
- Hermiston
- Holy Corner
- Holyrood
- Holyrood Park
- Ingliston
- Inverleith
- Jock's Lodge
- Joppa
- Juniper Green
- Kaimes
- Kingsknowe
- Kirkliston
- Lauriston
- Leith
- Liberton
- Little France
- Lochend
- Lochrin
- Longstone
- Marchmont
- Maybury
- Mayfield
- Meadowbank
- The Meadows
- Merchiston
- Moredun
- Morningside
- Mortonhall
- Mountcastle
- Muirhouse
- Murrayfield
- New Town
- Newbridge
- Newcraighall
- Newhaven
- Newington
- Niddrie
- Northfield
- Old Town
- Oxgangs
- Parkgrove
- Parkhead
- Piershill
- Pilrig
- Pilton
- Polwarth
- Portobello
- Powderhall
- Prestonfield
- Ratho
- Ratho Station
- Ravelston
- Redford
- Restalrig
- Riccarton
- Roseburn
- Saughton
- Sciennes
- Seafield
- Shandon
- Sighthill
- Silverknowes
- Slateford
- South Gyle
- South Queensferry
- Stenhouse
- Stockbridge
- Swanston
- Tollcross
- Torphin
- Trinity
- Turnhouse
- Tynecastle
- Warriston
- Waterfront Edinburgh
- West Coates
- West Craigs
- West End
- West Pilton
- Wester Broom
- Wester Hailes
- Western Harbour

=== Locations in Edinburgh ===
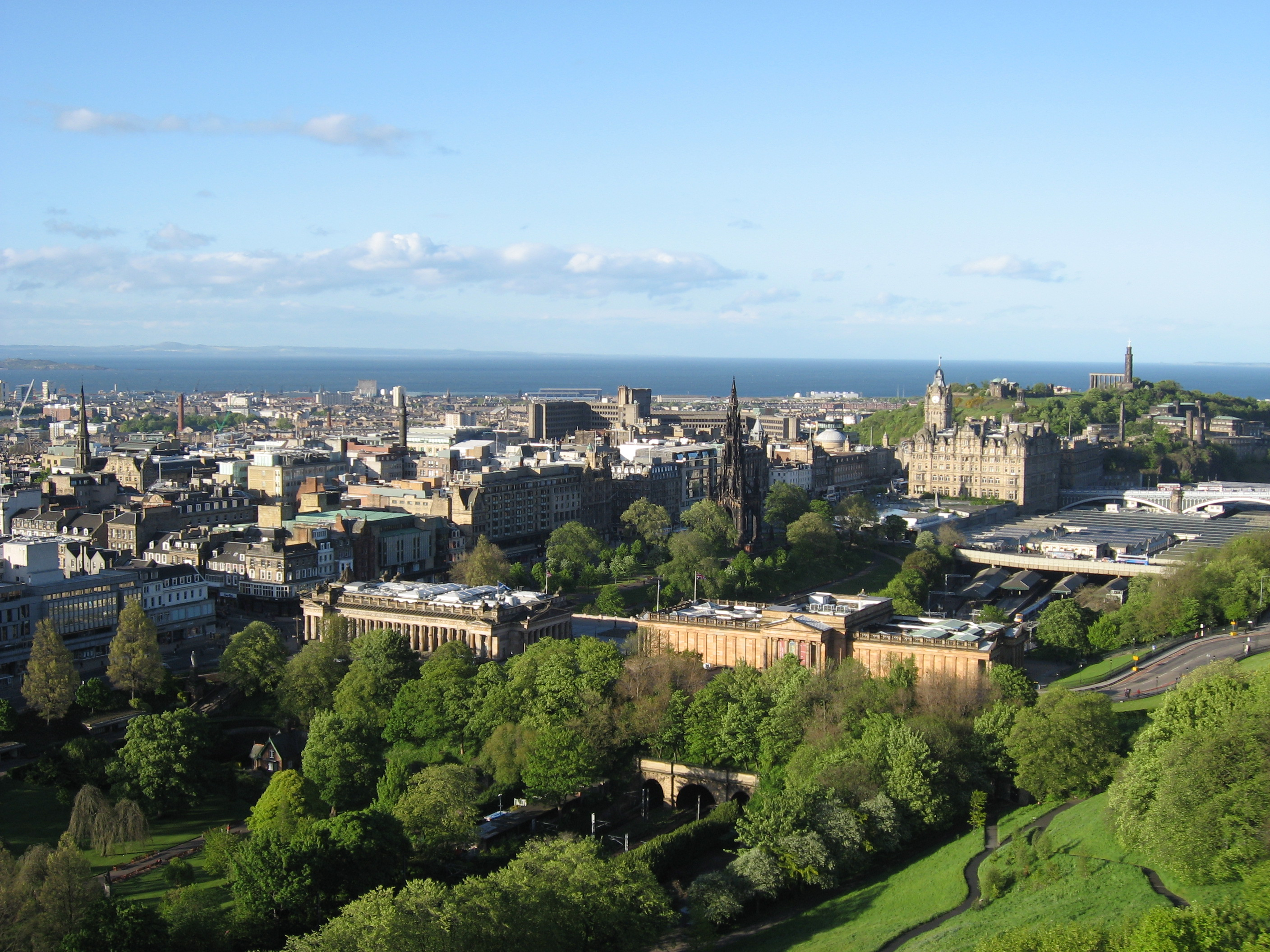
View over Edinburgh

- Tourist attractions in Edinburgh
  - Archaeological sites in Edinburgh
    - Cramond Roman Fort
  - Museums in Edinburgh
  - Shopping areas and markets
  - World Heritage Sites in Edinburgh
    - New Town
    - Old Town

==== Bridges in Edinburgh ====
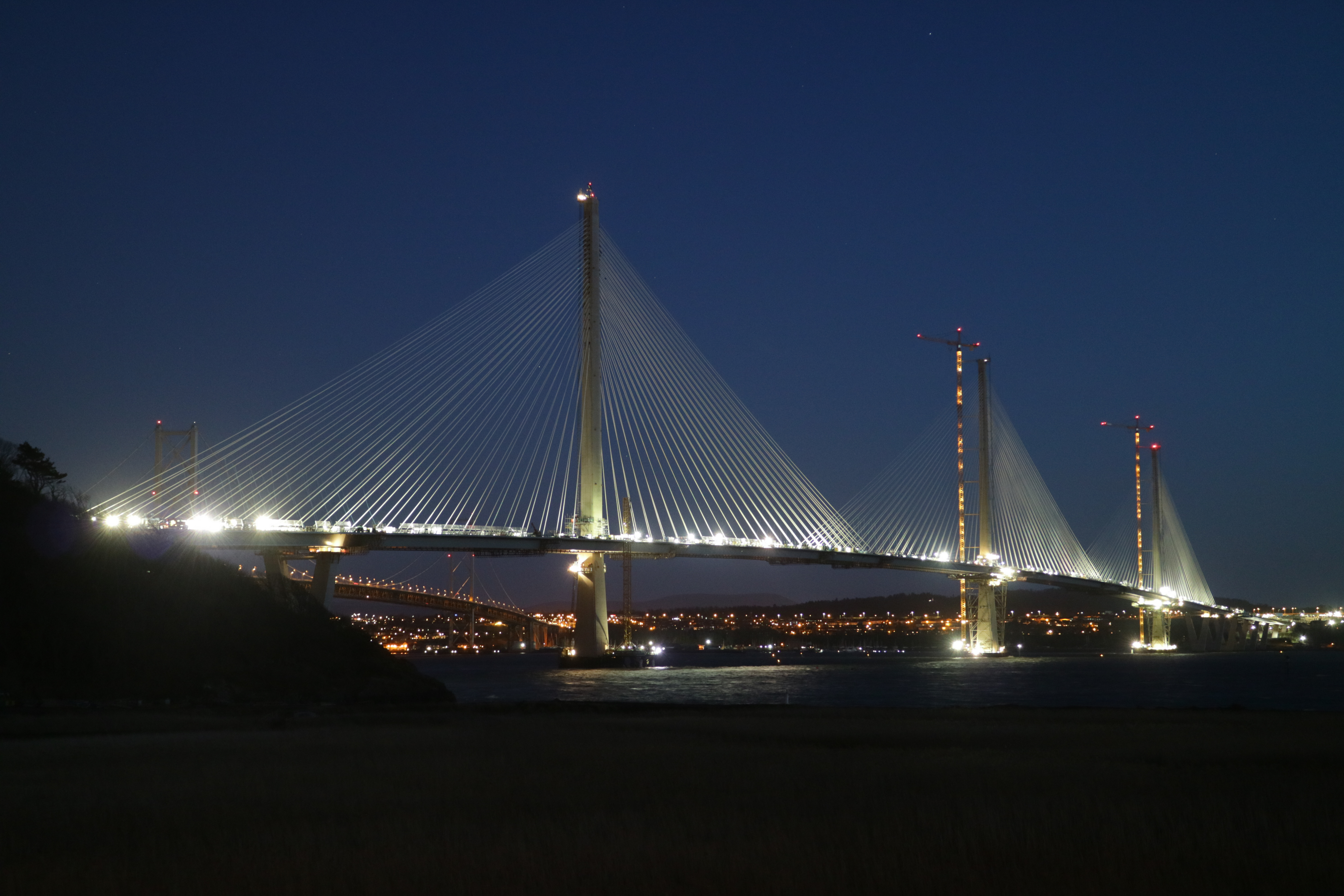
Queensferry Crossing road bridge

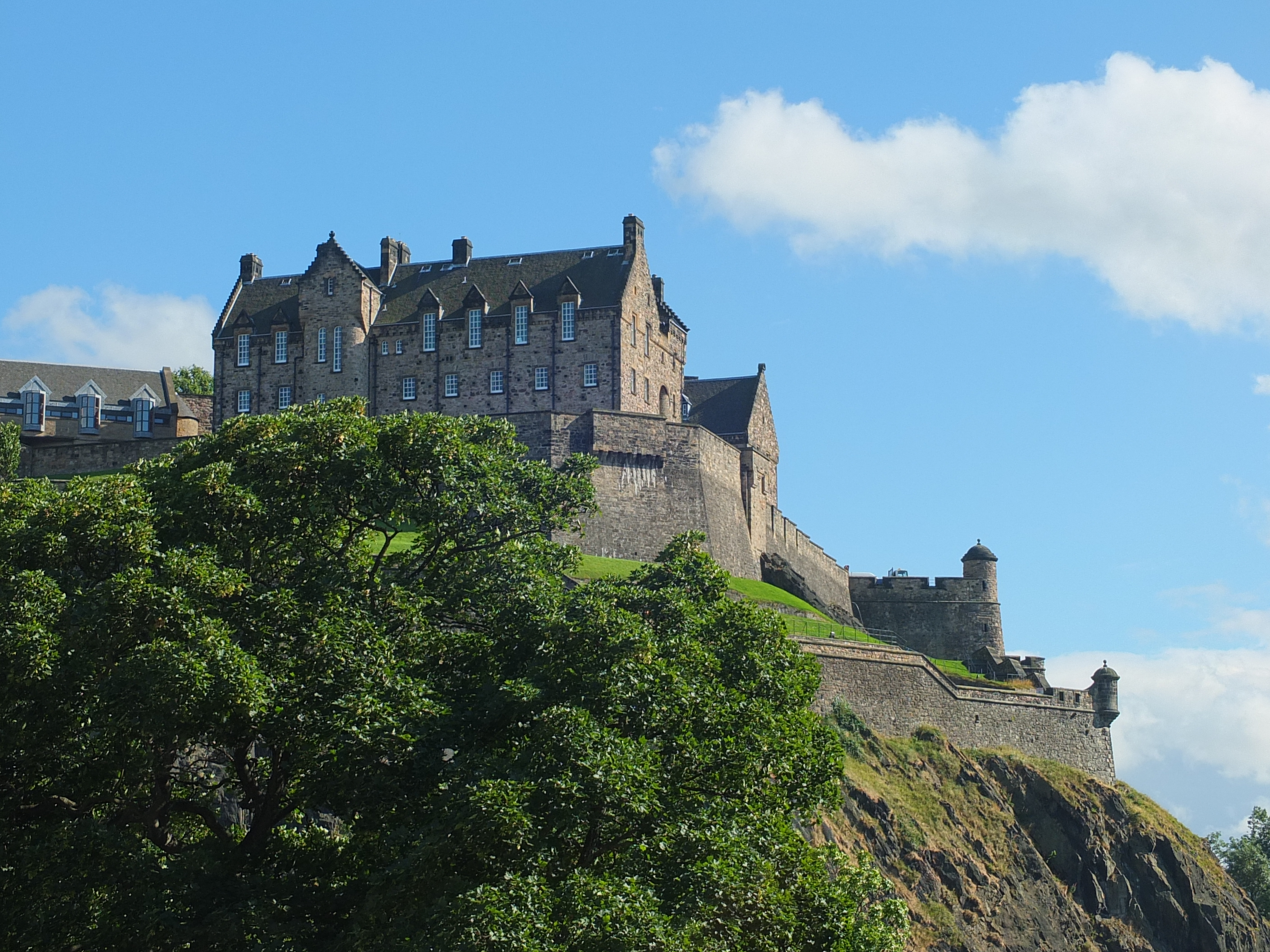
Edinburgh Castle

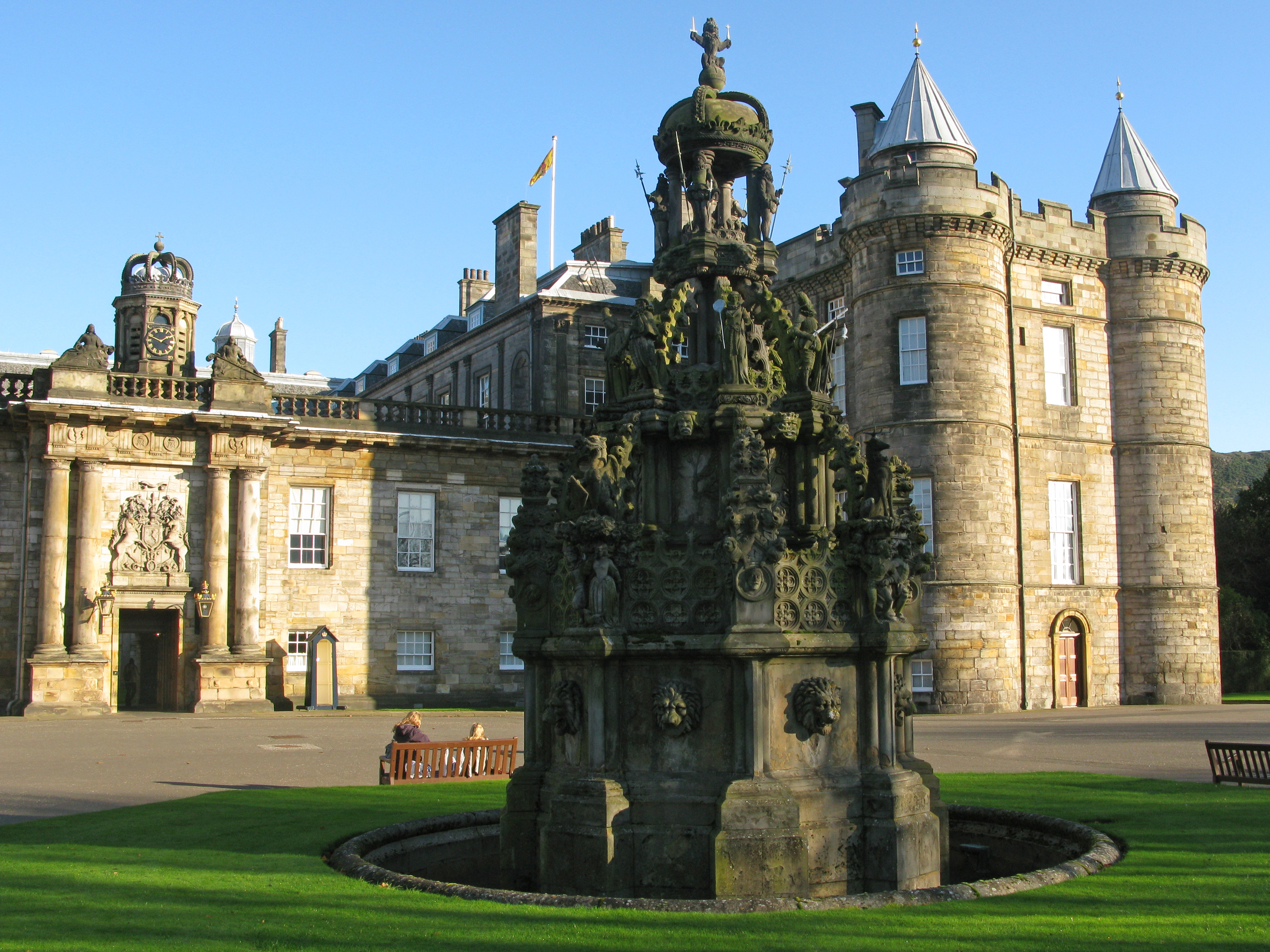
Fountain at Holyrood Palace

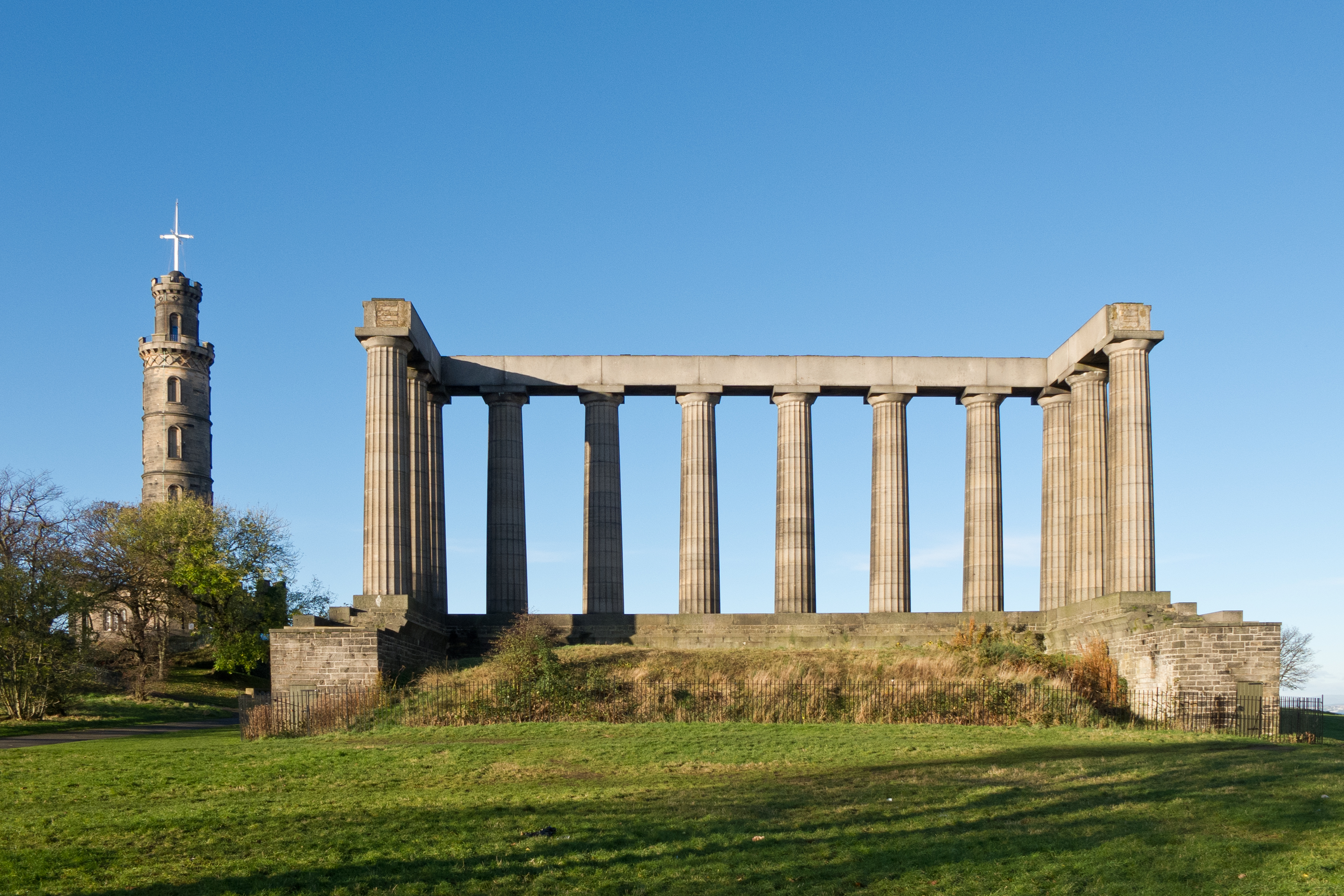
The National Monument of Scotland (right) and Nelson Monument (left)

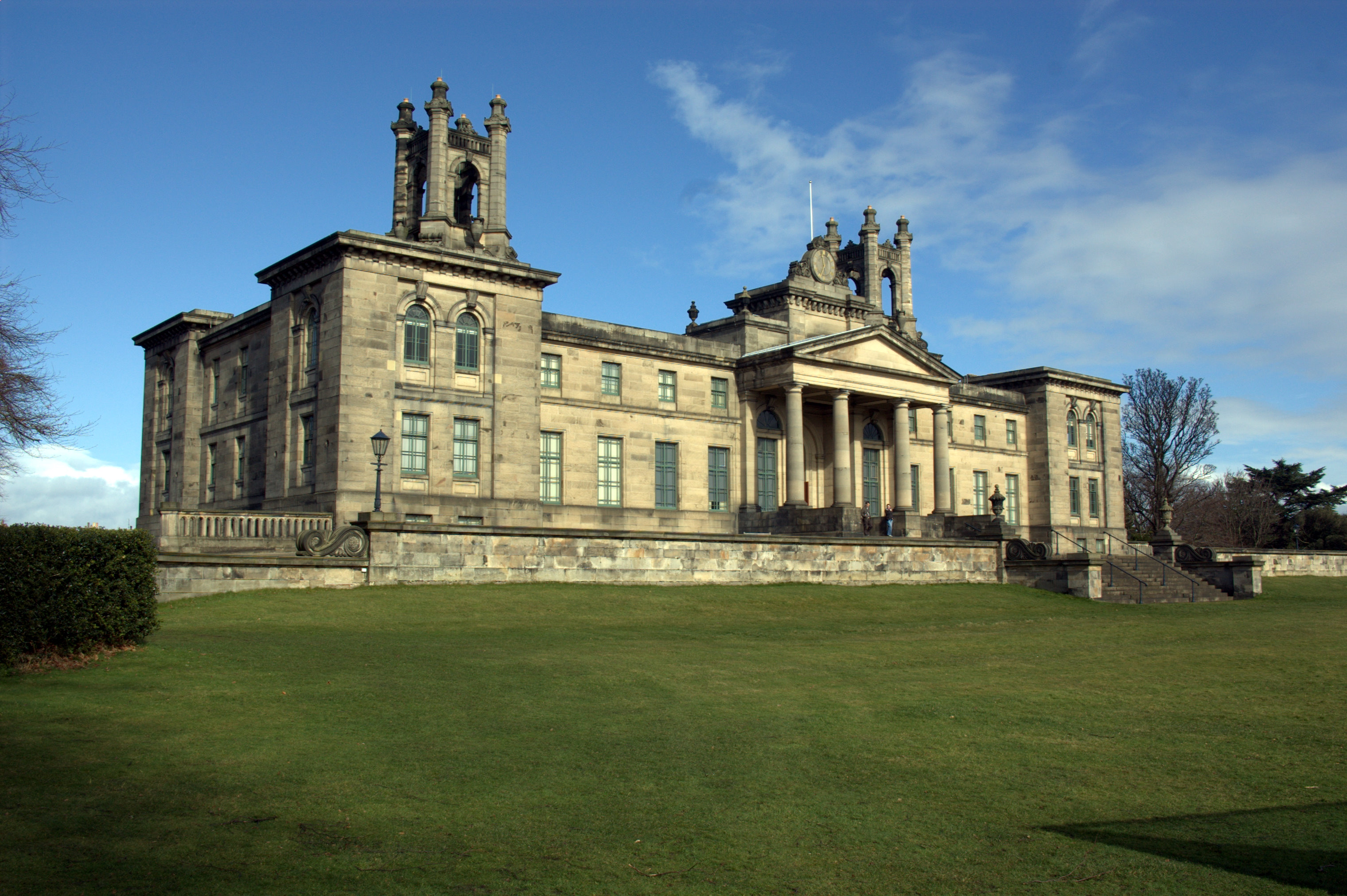
The Dean Gallery, part of the Scottish National Gallery of Modern Art

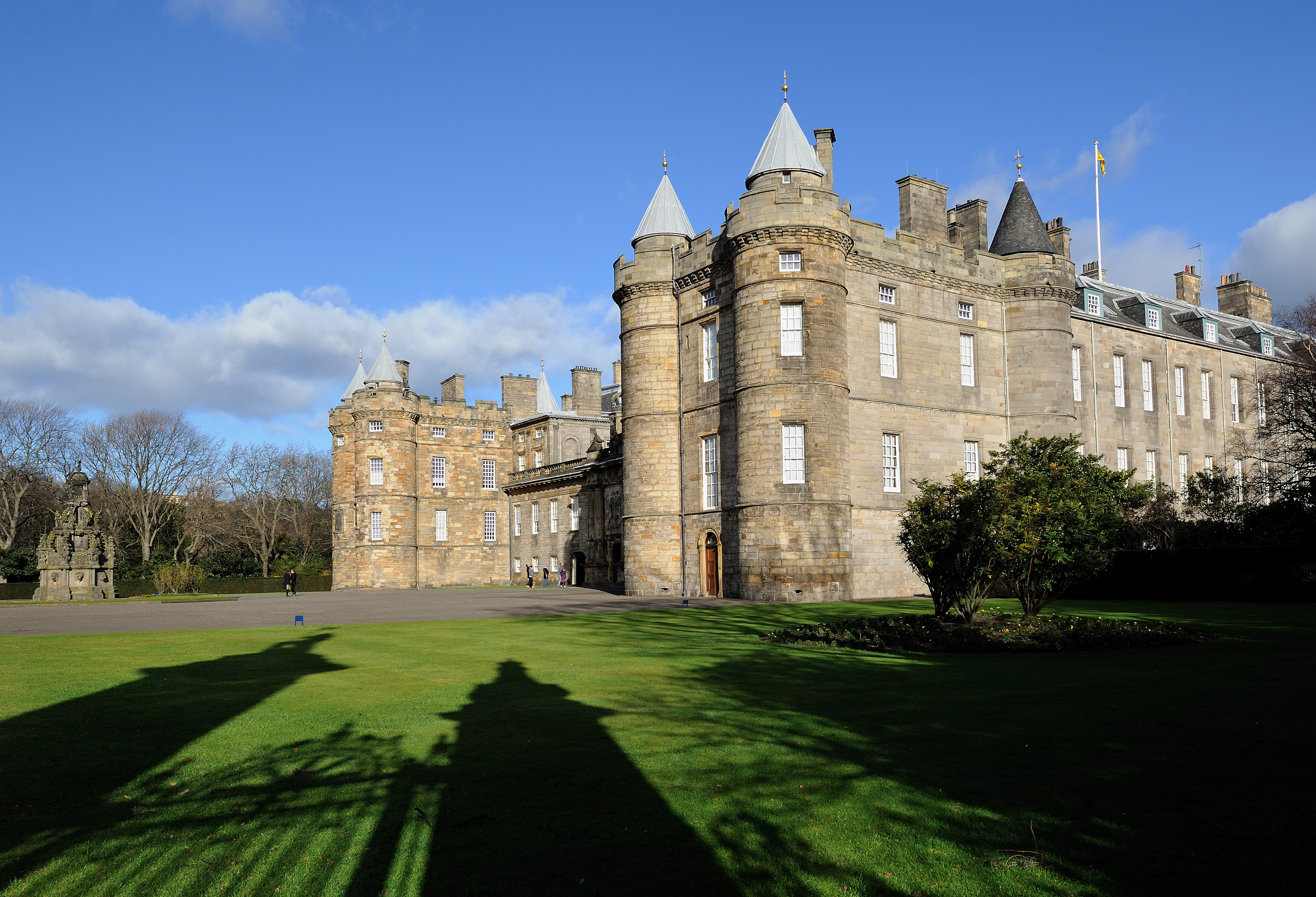
Holyrood Palace, the official residence of the British monarch in Scotland

Bridges in Edinburgh

- Dean Bridge
- Forth Road Bridge
- Leamington Lift Bridge
- North Bridge
- Queensferry Crossing
- Regent Bridge
- South Bridge
  - Edinburgh Vaults
- Victoria Swing Bridge
- Waverley Bridge

==== Castles in Edinburgh ====
Castles in Edinburgh

- Craigmillar Castle
- Edinburgh Castle
  - Mons Meg
- Lauriston Castle

==== Cultural and exhibition centres in Edinburgh ====
- Edinburgh International Conference Centre
- Royal Highland Centre

==== Fortifications in Edinburgh ====
- Edinburgh town walls

==== Fountains in Edinburgh ====
- Greyfriars Bobby Fountain
- Ross Fountain

==== Monuments and memorials in Edinburgh ====
- Dugald Stewart Monument
- National Monument of Scotland
- Nelson Monument
- Political Martyrs' Monument
- Scott Monument
- Scottish American Memorial
- Scottish National War Memorial
- Scheduled monuments in Edinburgh

==== Museums and art galleries in Edinburgh ====
Museums in Edinburgh

- Fruitmarket Gallery
- Modern Two (Dean Gallery)
- Museum of Edinburgh
- Museum on the Mound
- National Museum of Scotland
- National War Museum
- Queen's Gallery
- Scottish National Gallery
- Scottish National Gallery of Modern Art
- Scottish National Portrait Gallery
- Writers' Museum

==== Palaces and villas in Edinburgh ====
- Holyrood Palace

==== Parks and gardens in Edinburgh ====
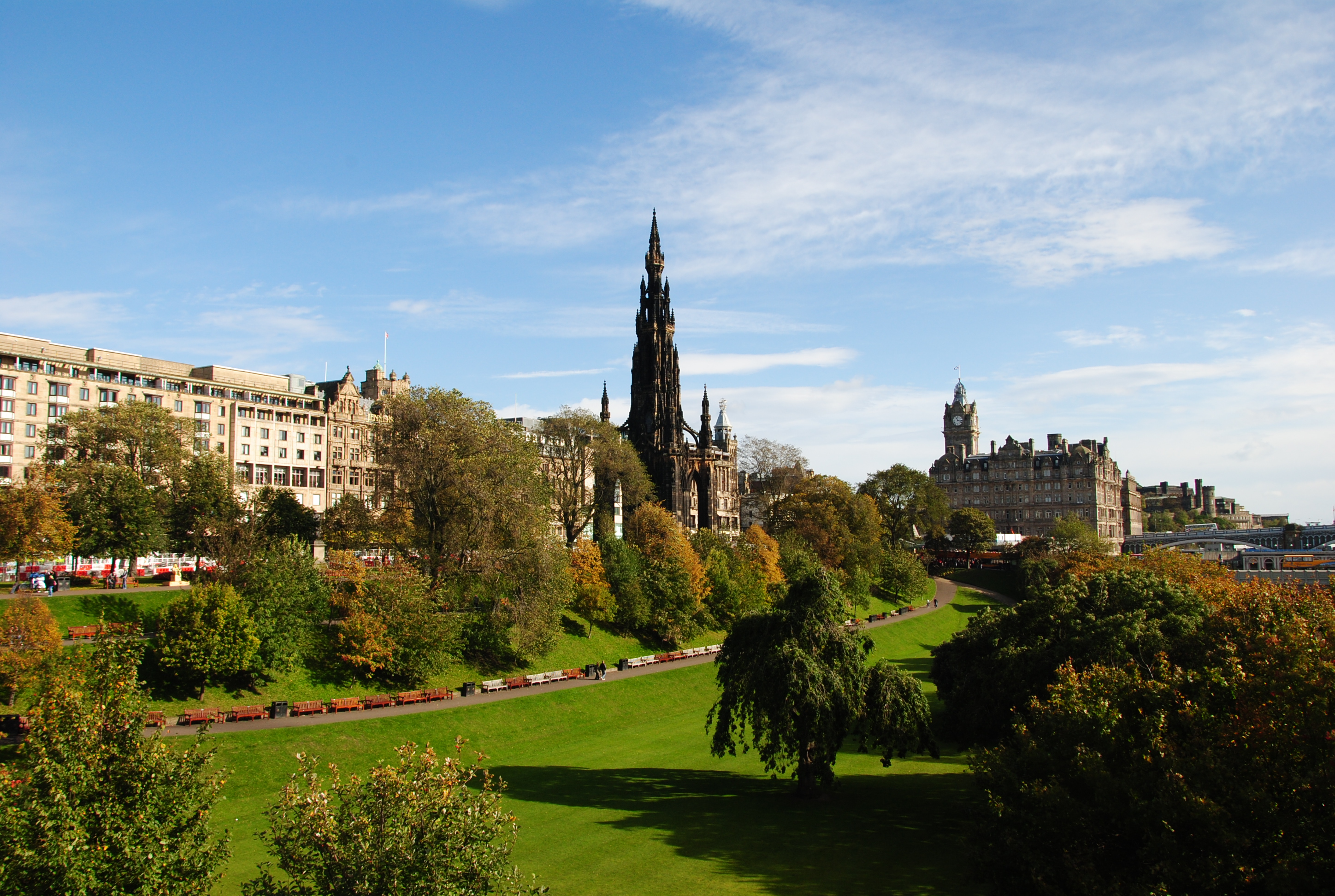
The Princes Street Gardens, the best known park in Edinburgh

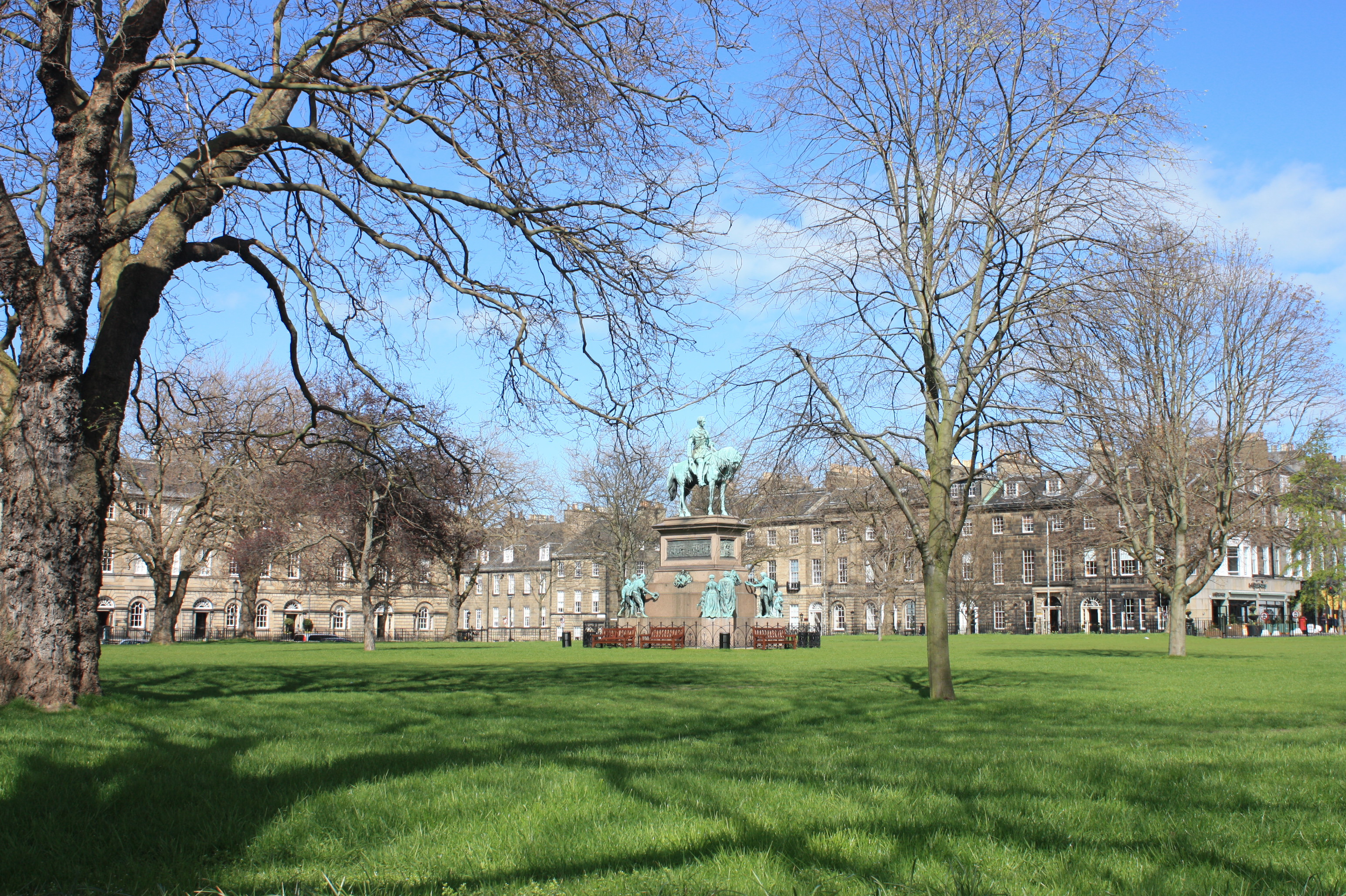
Charlotte Square, a garden square in the New Town

- Bruntsfield Links
- Dean Gardens
- Granton Garden
- Holyrood Park
- Jupiter Artland
- King George V Park
- Lochend Park
- London Road Gardens
- Princes Street Gardens
- Regent, Royal and Carlton Terrace Gardens
- Royal Botanic Garden Edinburgh
- The Meadows
- Victoria Park

==== Public squares in Edinburgh ====
- Bristo Square
- Charlotte Square
- George Square
- Grassmarket
- St Andrew Square

==== Religious buildings in Edinburgh ====
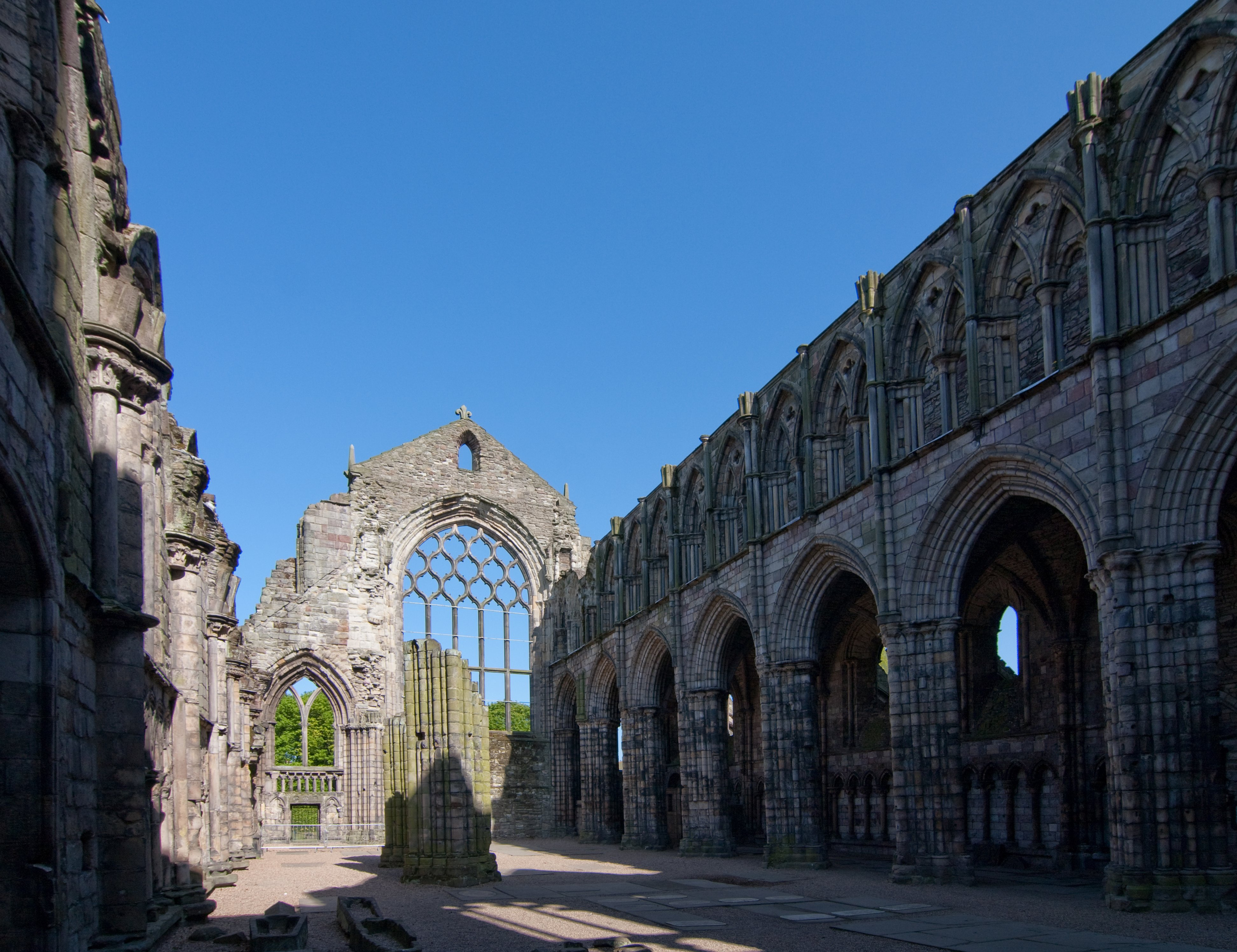
The ruins of Holyrood Abbey

- Duddingston Kirk
- Holyrood Abbey
- Old Saint Paul's
- St Giles' Cathedral
- St John's church
- St Mary's Cathedral (Episcopal)
- St Mary's Cathedral (Roman Catholic)
- St Stephen's Church
- Tron Kirk

==== Secular buildings in Edinburgh ====
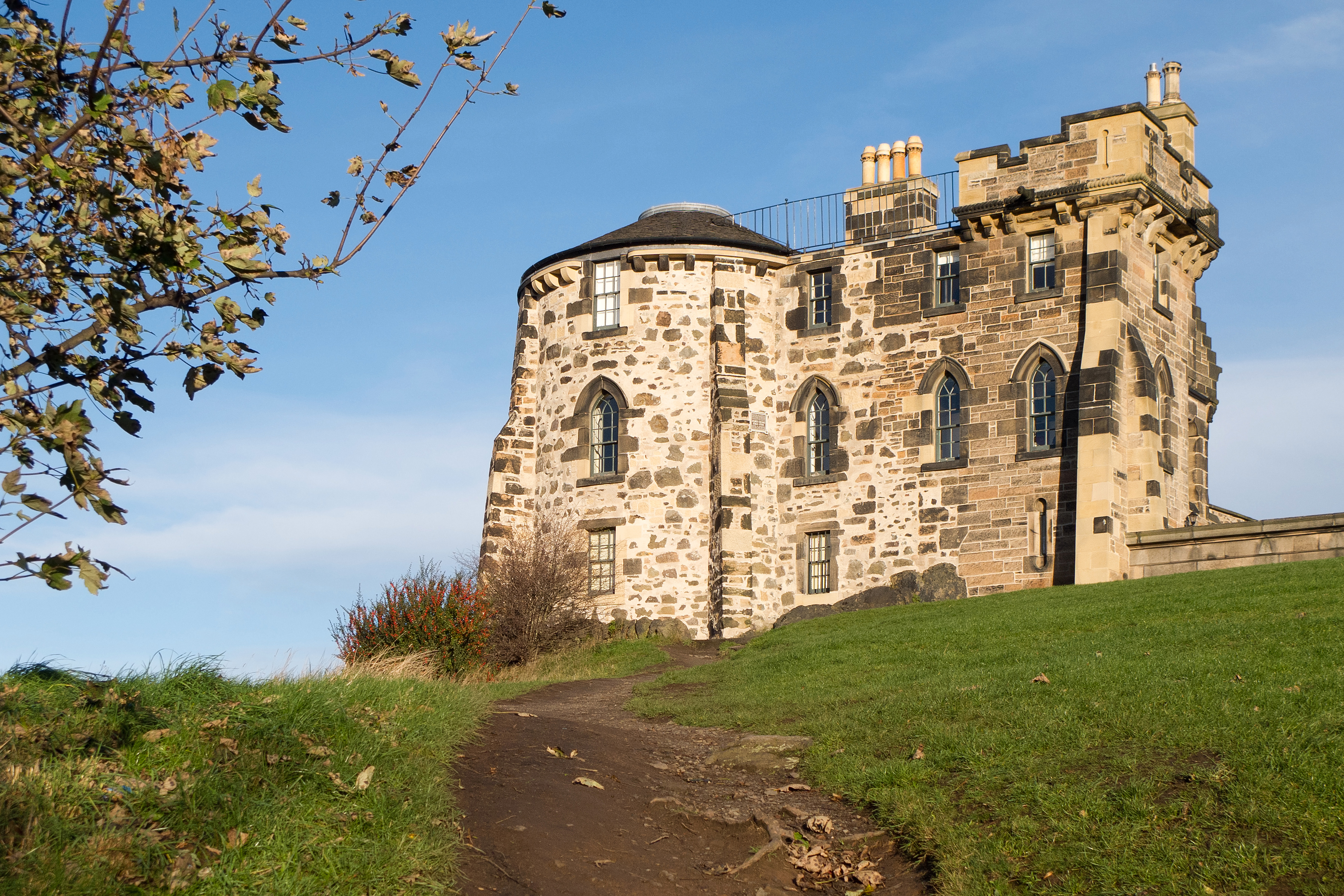
City Observatory, the Gothic Tower

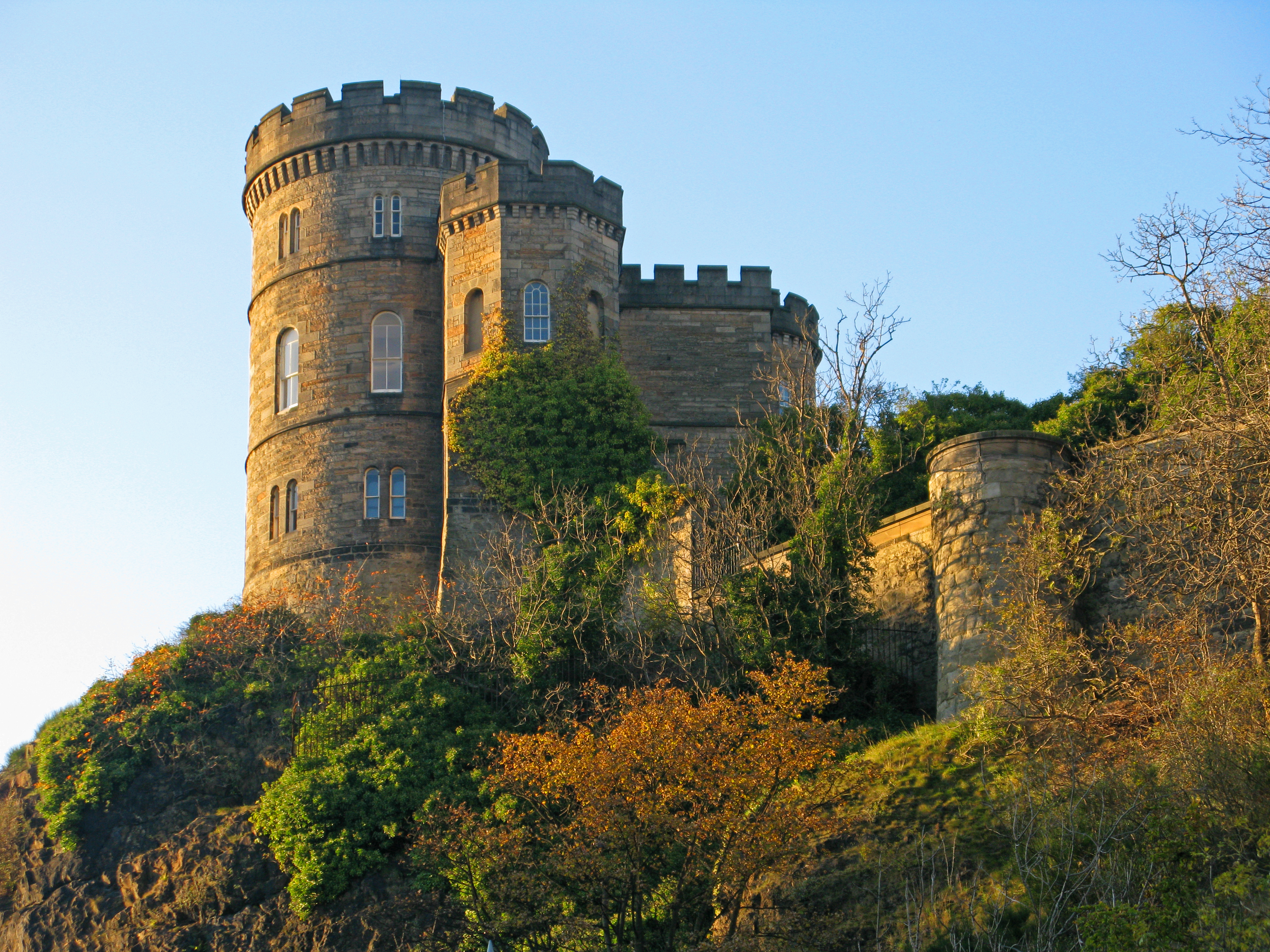
The Governor's House

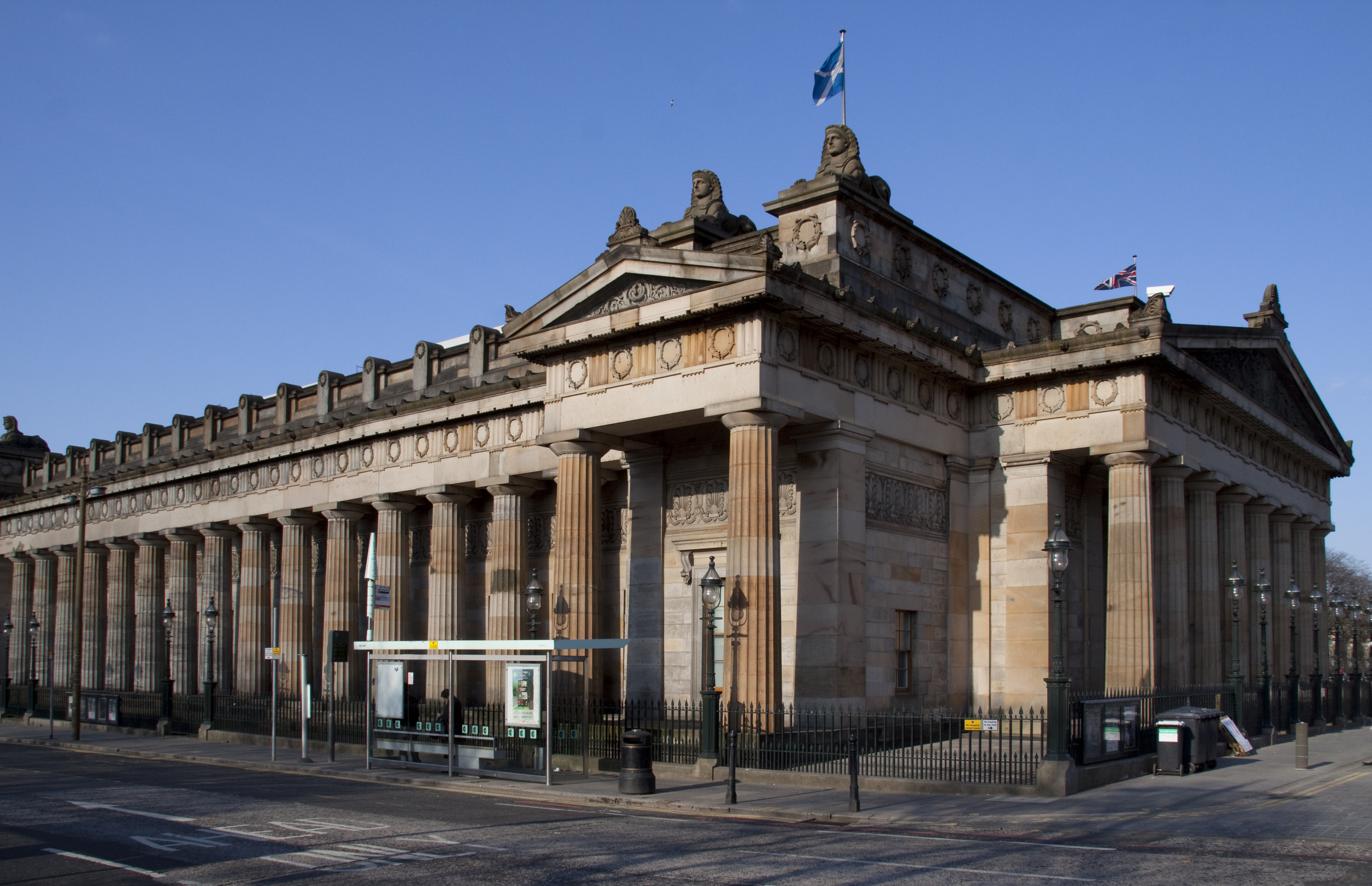
The Royal Scottish Academy Building

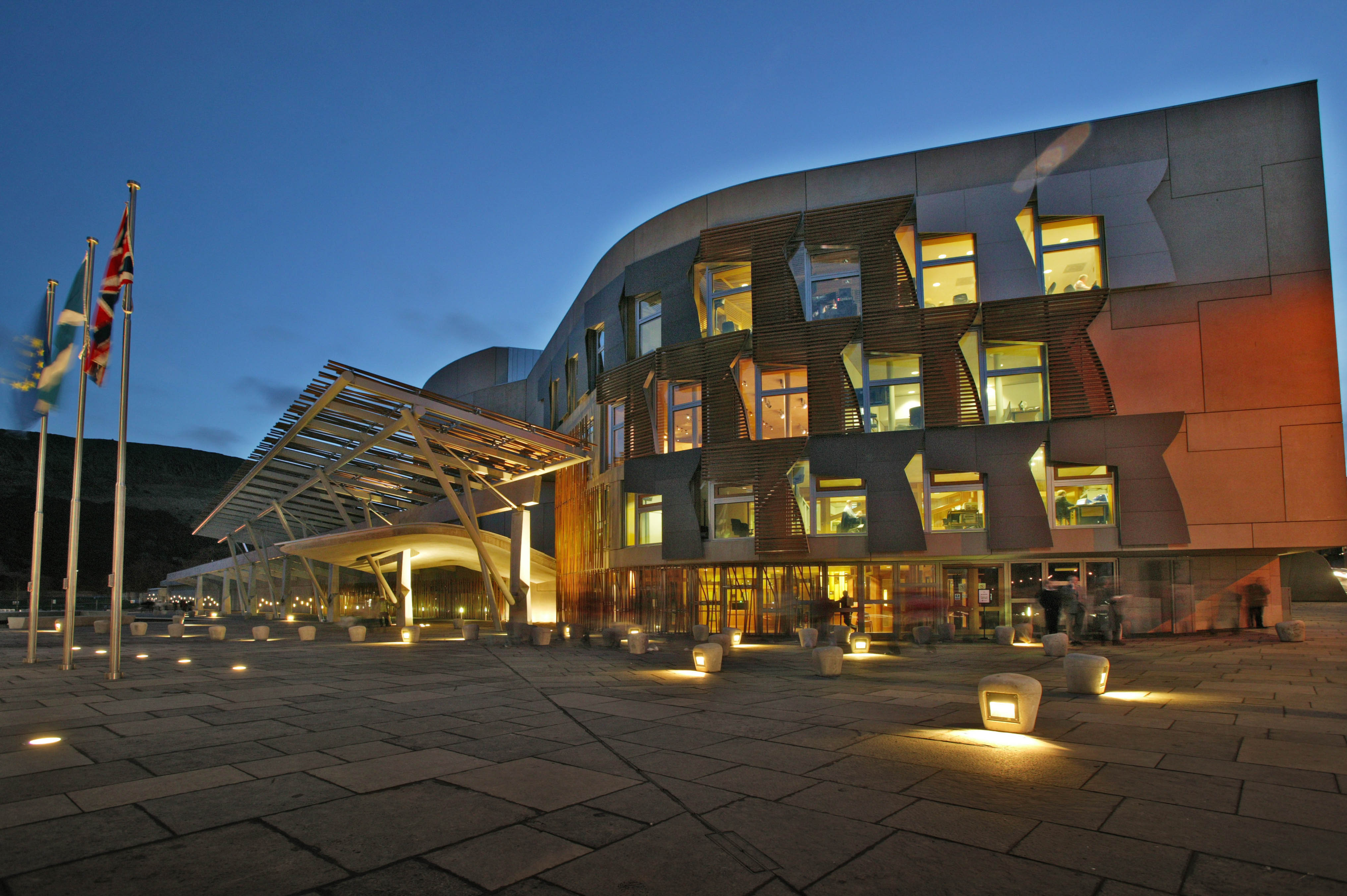
The Scottish Parliament Building

Listed buildings in Edinburgh

- Archers' Hall
- Bute House
- Canongate Tolbooth
- Central Library
- City Observatory
- Craig House
- The Dome
- The Drum
- Dundas House
- Edinburgh City Chambers
- The Georgian House
- Gladstone's Land
- Gordon Aikman Lecture Theatre
- Governor's House
- The Hub
- Inverleith House
- Longmore House
- Martello Court
- National Library of Scotland
- New Register House
- Old Royal High School
- Our Dynamic Earth
- Panmure House
- Parliament House
- The Pleasance
- Queensberry House
- Royal Scottish Academy Building
- Scottish Parliament Building
- Scottish Storytelling Centre
- St Andrew's House
- Summerhall
- Surgeons' Hall
- Victoria Quay

==== Streets in Edinburgh ====
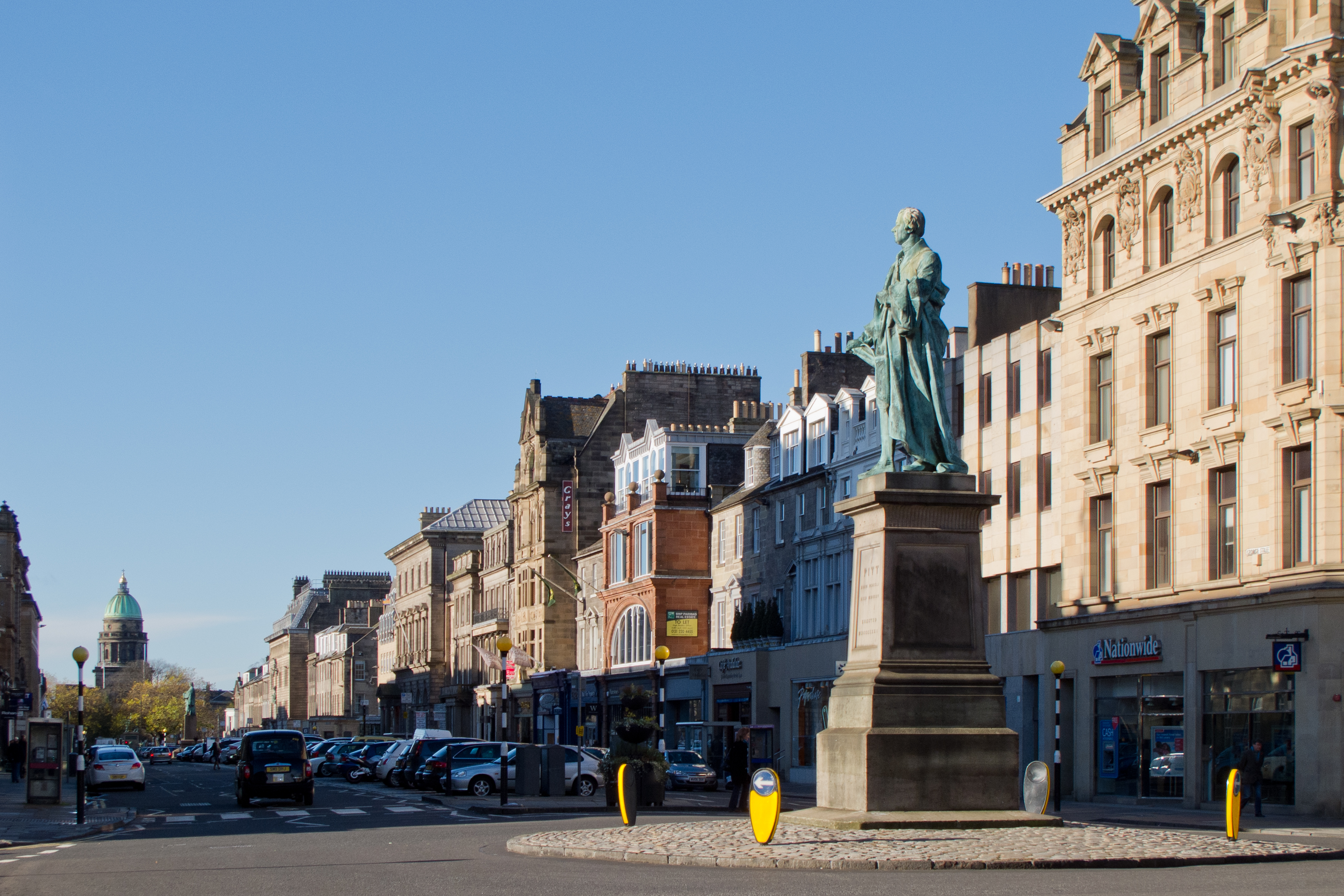
View looking west along George Street

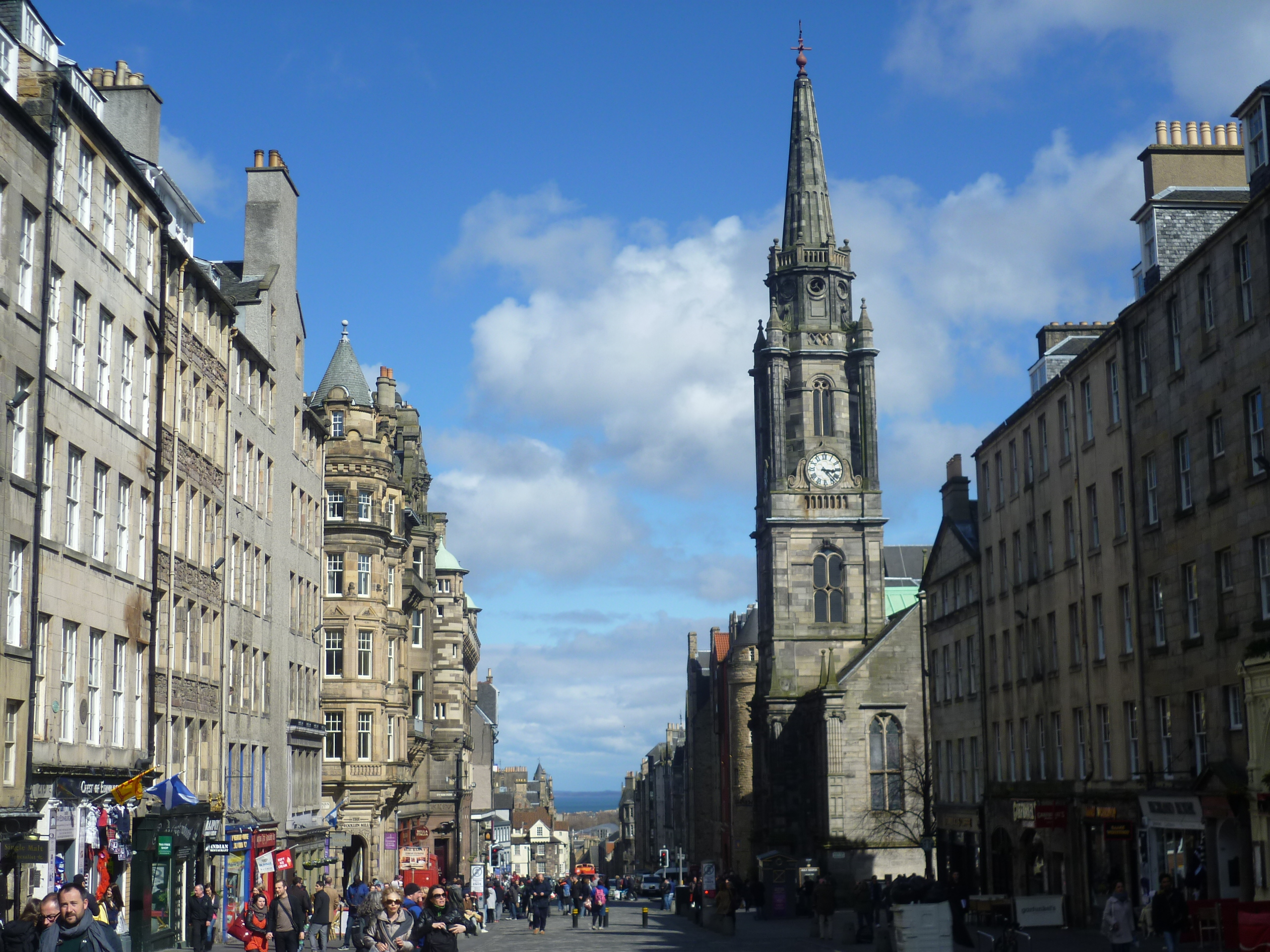
The High Street, part of the Royal Mile

- Carlton Terrace
- Cockburn Street
- Drummond Street
- Ferry Road
- George Street
- Leith Walk
- Pleasance
- Princes Street
- Queen Street
- Regent Terrace
- Royal Mile
  - Closes on the Royal Mile
- Royal Terrace
- West Port

==== Theatres in Edinburgh ====
- Church Hill Theatre
- Edinburgh Festival Theatre
- King's Theatre
- Leith Theatre
- Royal Lyceum Theatre
- Traverse Theatre

=== Demographics of Edinburgh ===
Demographics of Edinburgh

== Government and politics of Edinburgh ==
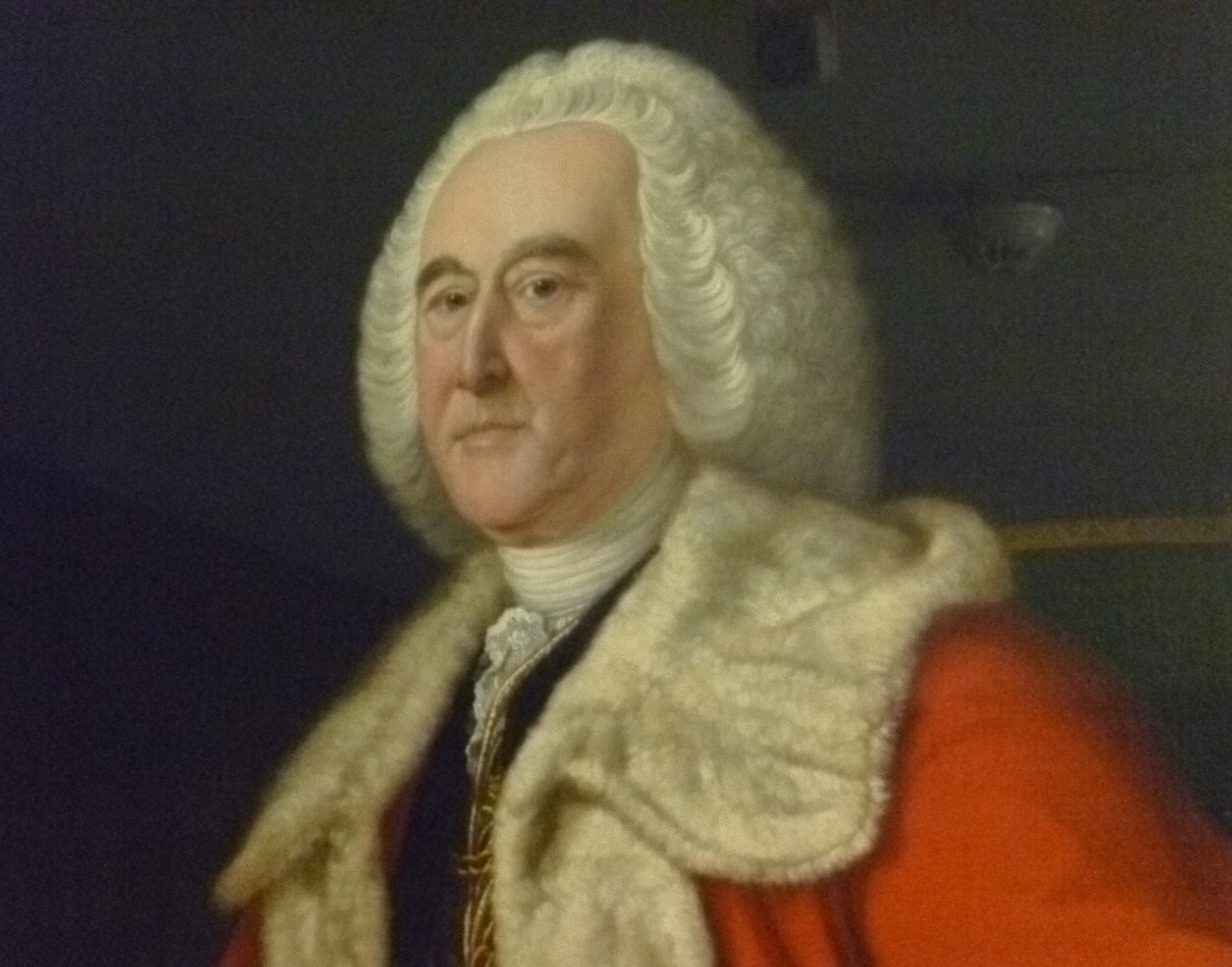
George Drummond (1688–1766), elected six times as Lord Provost of Edinburgh between 1725 and 1764

Politics of Edinburgh

=== Politics ===
- City of Edinburgh Council
- Lord Provost of Edinburgh
- International relations of Edinburgh
  - Twin towns and sister cities of Edinburgh

==== UK Constituencies ====
- Edinburgh North and Leith
- Edinburgh East
- Edinburgh South
- Edinburgh South West
- Edinburgh West

==== Scottish Parliament constituencies ====
- Edinburgh Eastern
- Edinburgh Northern and Leith
- Edinburgh Pentlands
- Edinburgh Central
- Edinburgh Western
- Edinburgh Southern

=== Law and order in Edinburgh ===
- Law enforcement in Edinburgh
  - Police Scotland

=== Military in Edinburgh ===
- Royal Company of Archers

== History of Edinburgh ==
History of Edinburgh

=== History of Edinburgh, by period or event ===
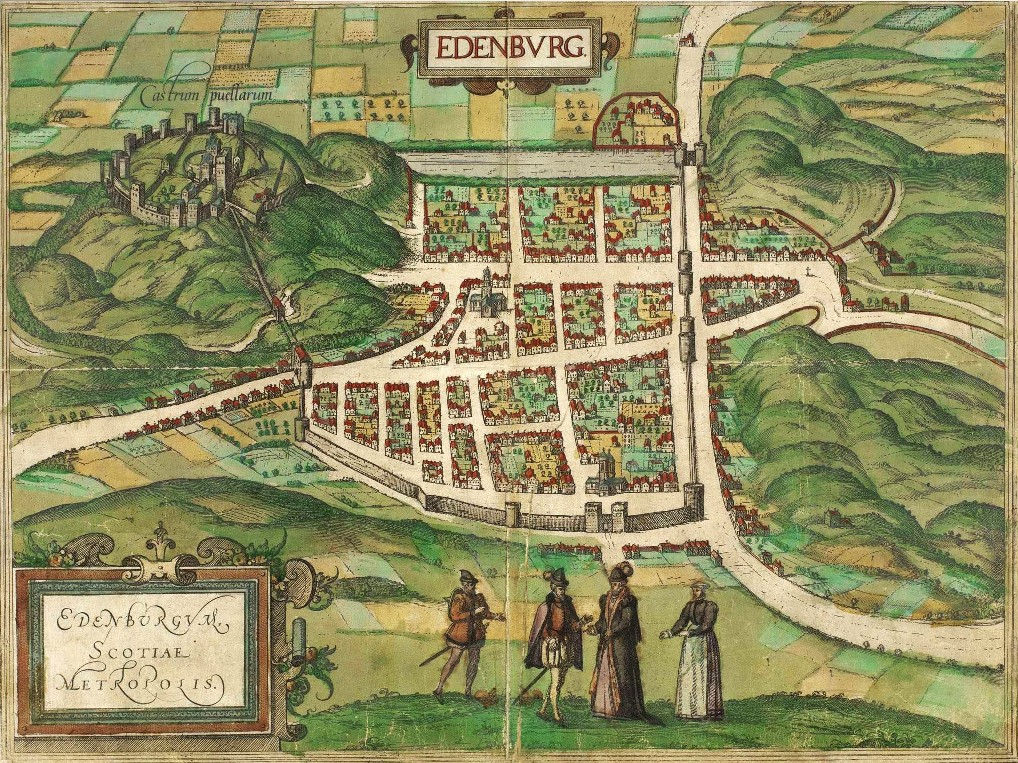
A map of Edinburgh in the 16th century, published in Braun and Hogenberg's Civitates orbis terrarum

Timeline of Edinburgh history

- Prehistory and origin of Edinburgh
- Edinburgh during the Middle Ages (7th to 15th century)
  - Edinburgh comes under Scottish rule during the reign of king Indulf (ca. 960)
  - King David I establishes the town of Edinburgh as one of Scotland's earliest royal burghs. (ca. 1130)
- Edinburgh during the 17th century
- Edinburgh during the 18th century
- Edinburgh during the 19th century
- Edinburgh during the 20th century

=== History of Edinburgh, by subject ===
- Burning of Edinburgh
- Treaty of Edinburgh

== Culture of Edinburgh ==
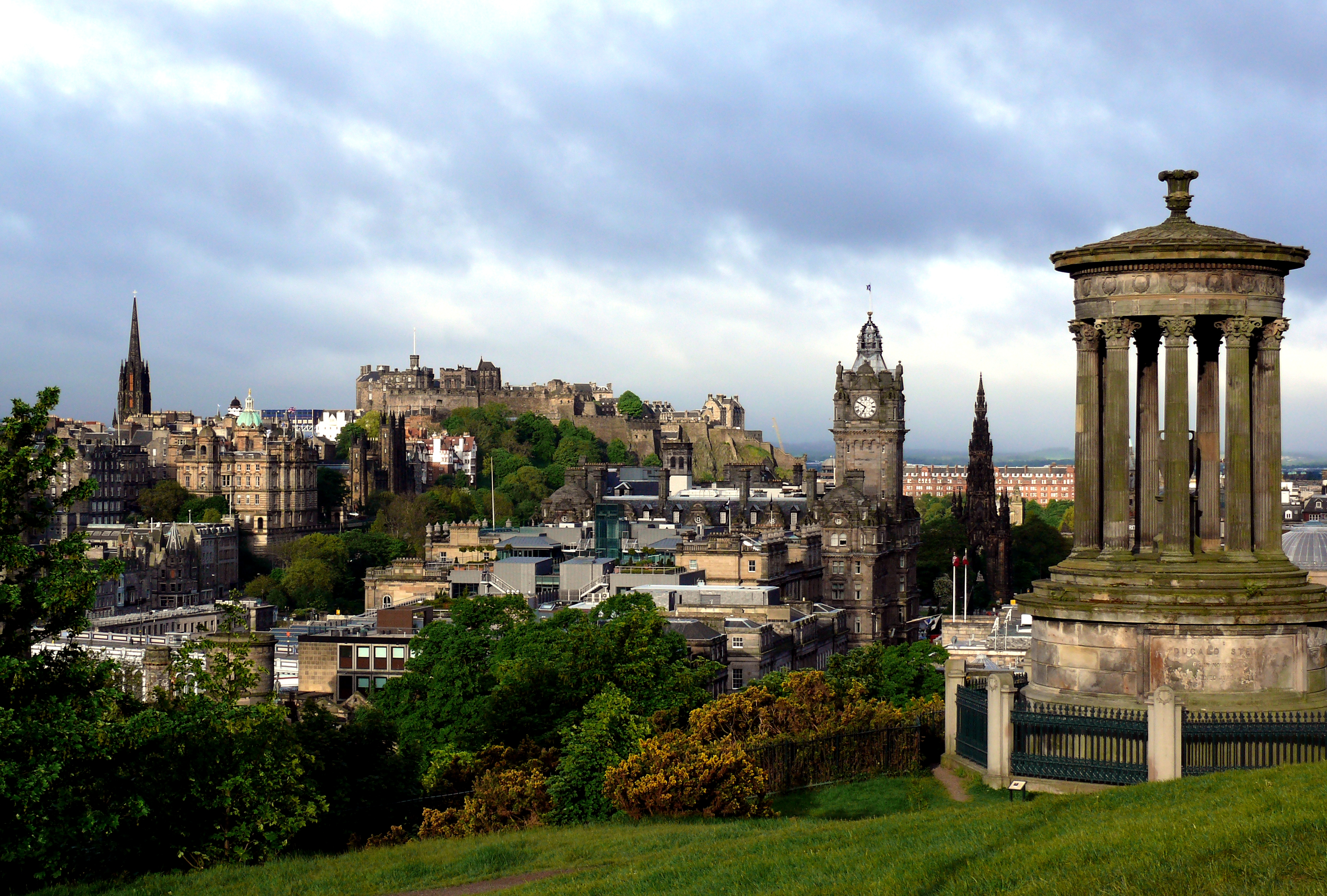
Architecture in Edinburgh

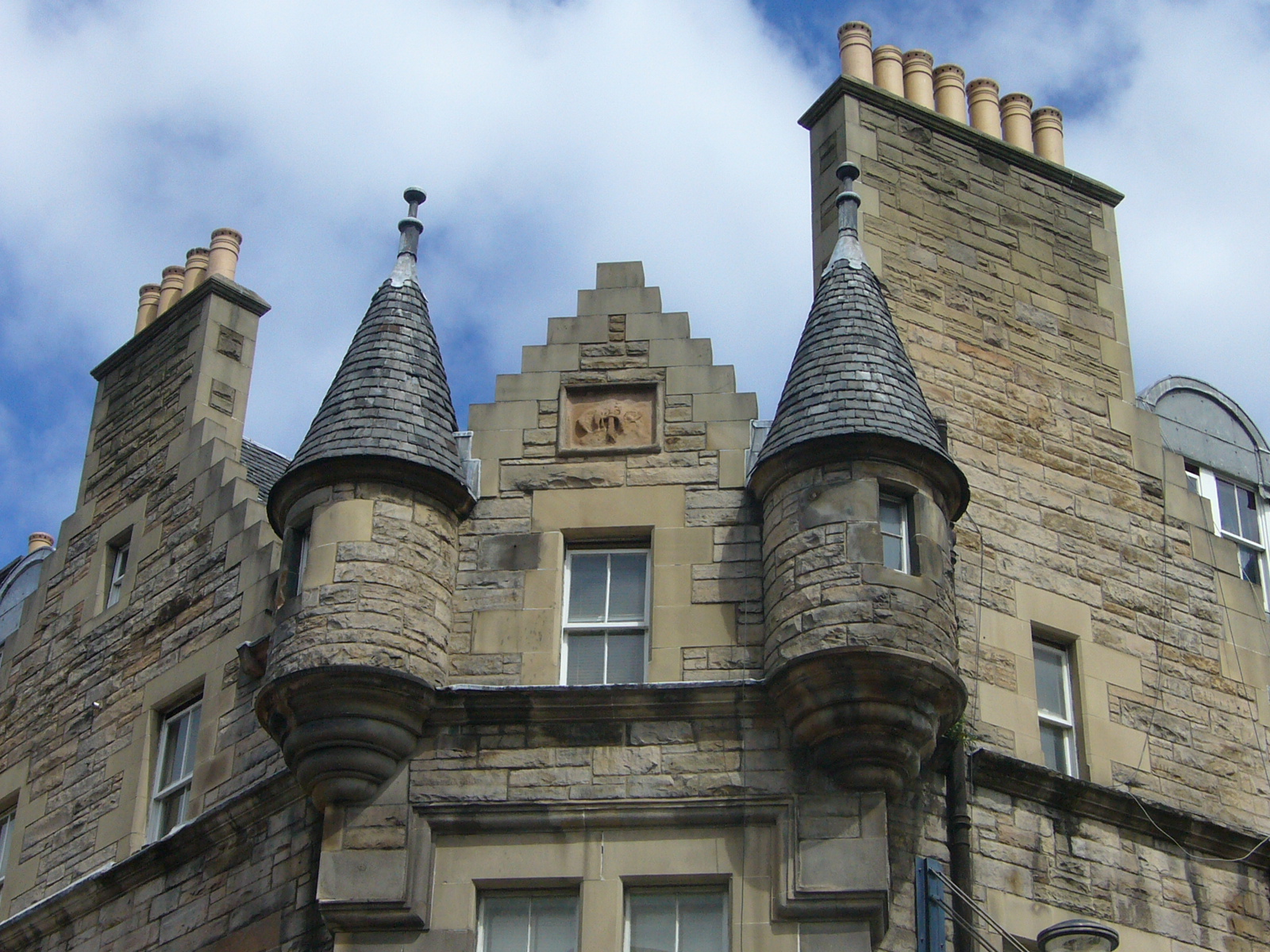
Scottish baronial-style turrets on Victorian tenements in St. Mary's Street

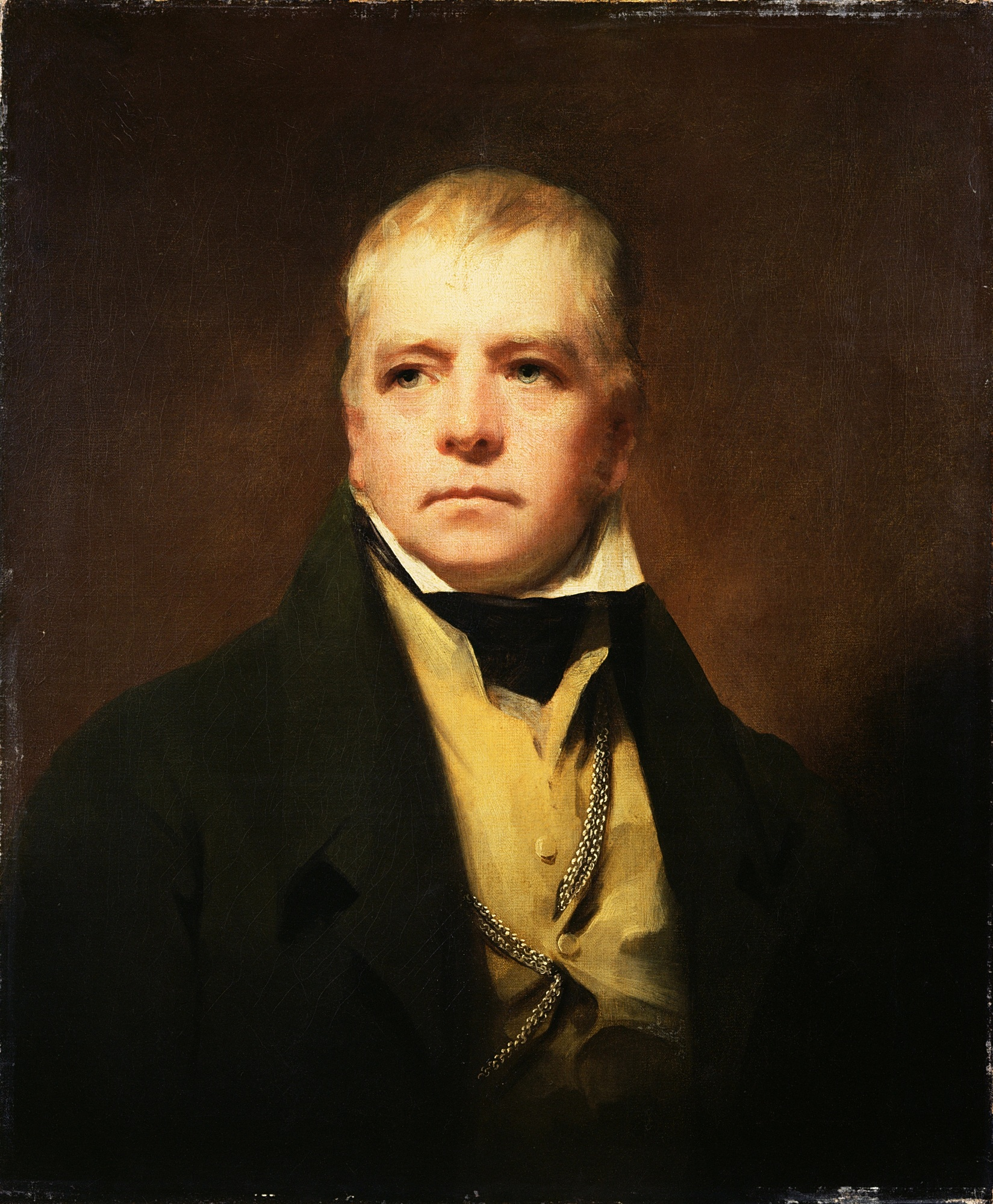
Portrait of Sir Walter Scott by Henry Raeburn, 1823

Culture of Edinburgh

=== Arts in Edinburgh ===
==== Architecture of Edinburgh ====
Architecture in Edinburgh

- Buildings in Edinburgh
  - Tallest buildings in Edinburgh

==== Cinema of Edinburgh ====
- Edinburgh Filmhouse
- Edinburgh International Film Festival

==== Literature of Edinburgh ====
Literature in Edinburgh

- Writers from Edinburgh
  - Arthur Conan Doyle
  - James Grant
  - Walter Scott
  - Robert Louis Stevenson

==== Music of Edinburgh ====
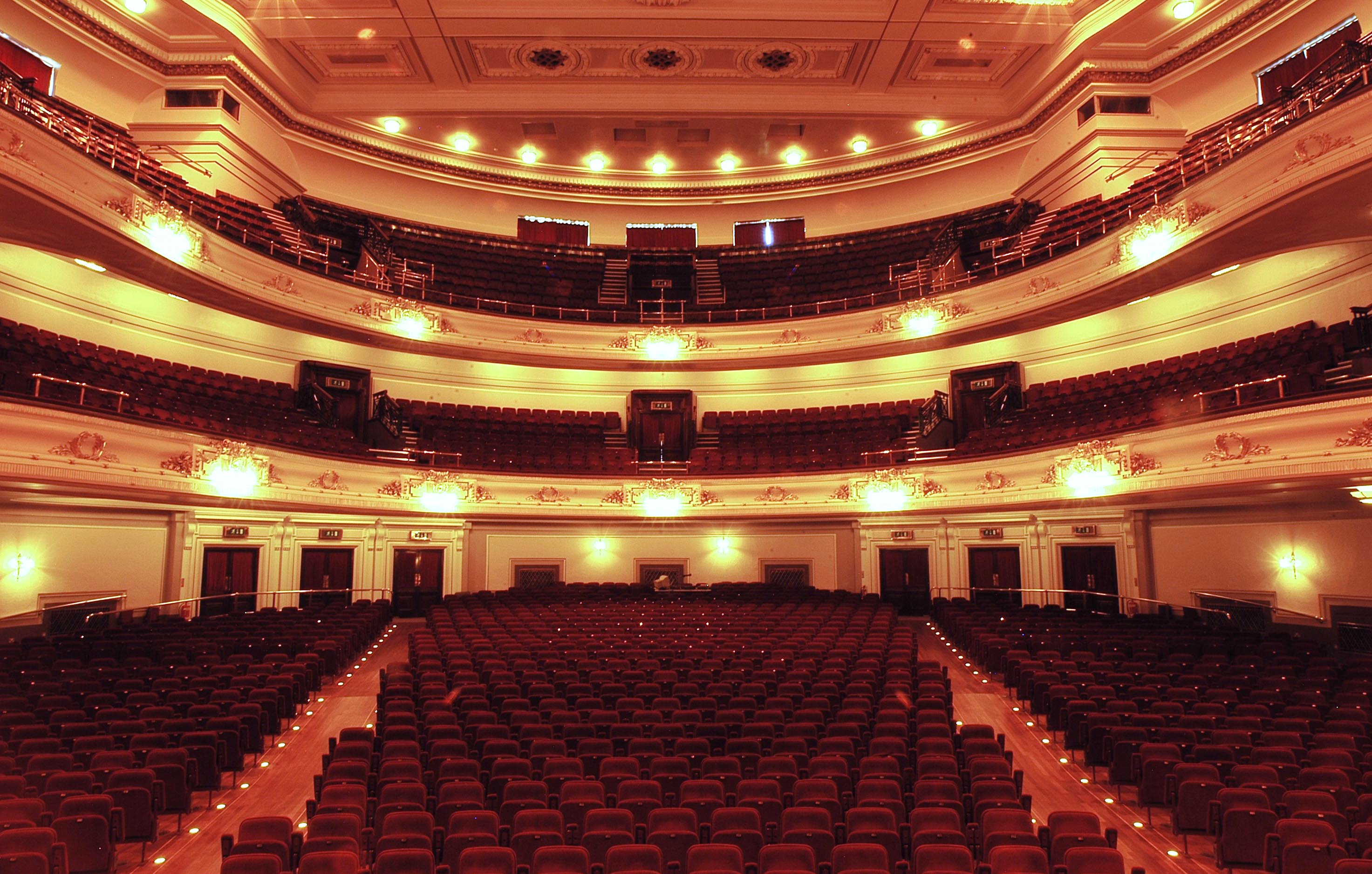
The auditorium of the Usher Hall

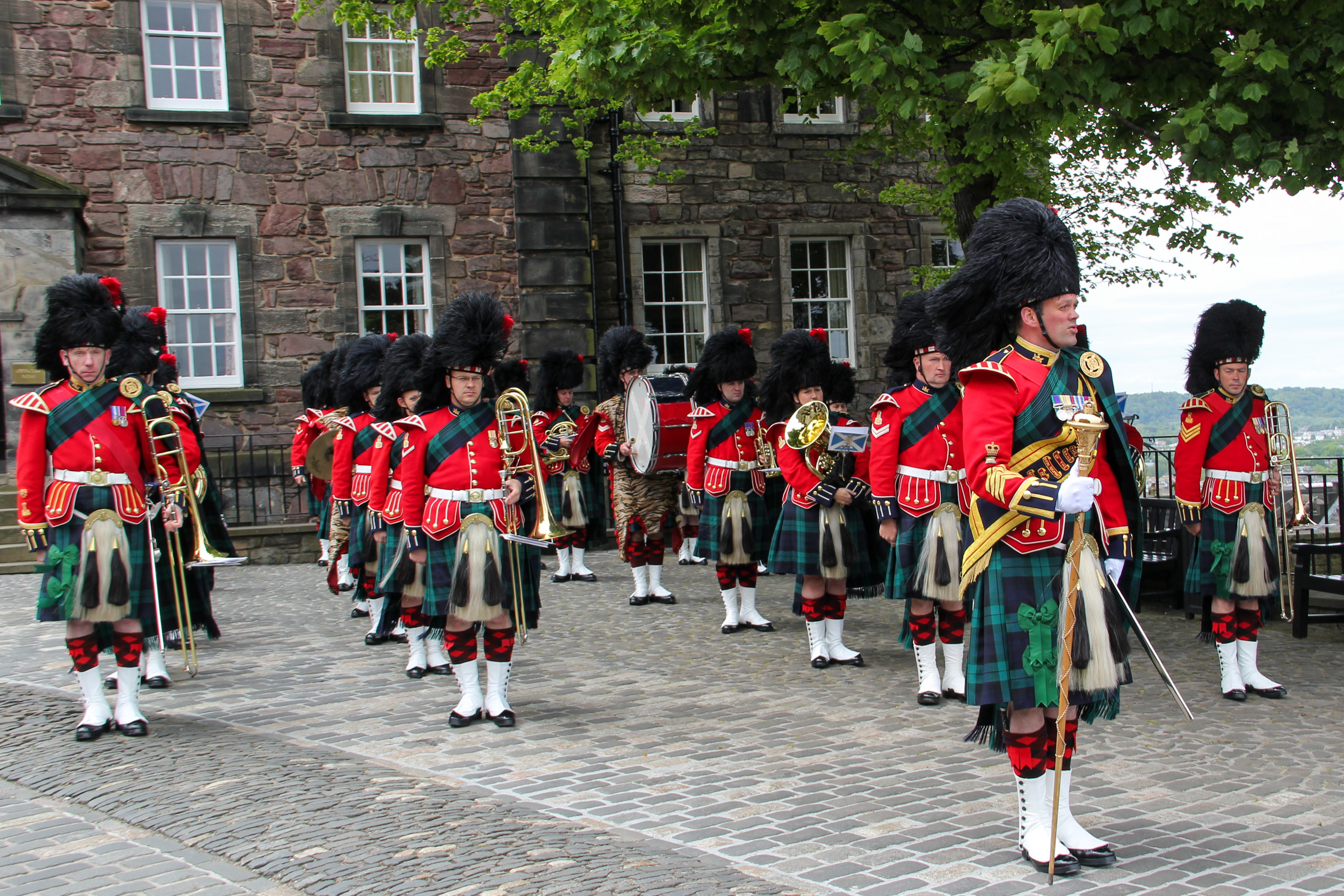
The Band of the Royal Regiment of Scotland at Edinburgh Castle

Music of Edinburgh

- Music festivals and competitions in Edinburgh
  - Edinburgh International Festival
- Music schools in Edinburgh
  - City of Edinburgh Music School
  - St Mary's Music School
- Music venues in Edinburgh
  - Queen's Hall
  - Reid Concert Hall
  - St Cecilia's Hall
  - Usher Hall
- Musical ensembles in Edinburgh
  - Edinburgh Grand Opera
  - Edinburgh University Music Society
  - Scottish Ballet
  - Scottish Chamber Orchestra
  - Scottish Opera
  - Southern Light Opera Company
- Musicians from Edinburgh
  - Alexander Mackenzie
- Songs about Edinburgh
  - Flowers of Edinburgh

==== Theatre of Edinburgh ====
Theatre in Edinburgh

- Edinburgh amateur theatre

==== Visual arts of Edinburgh ====
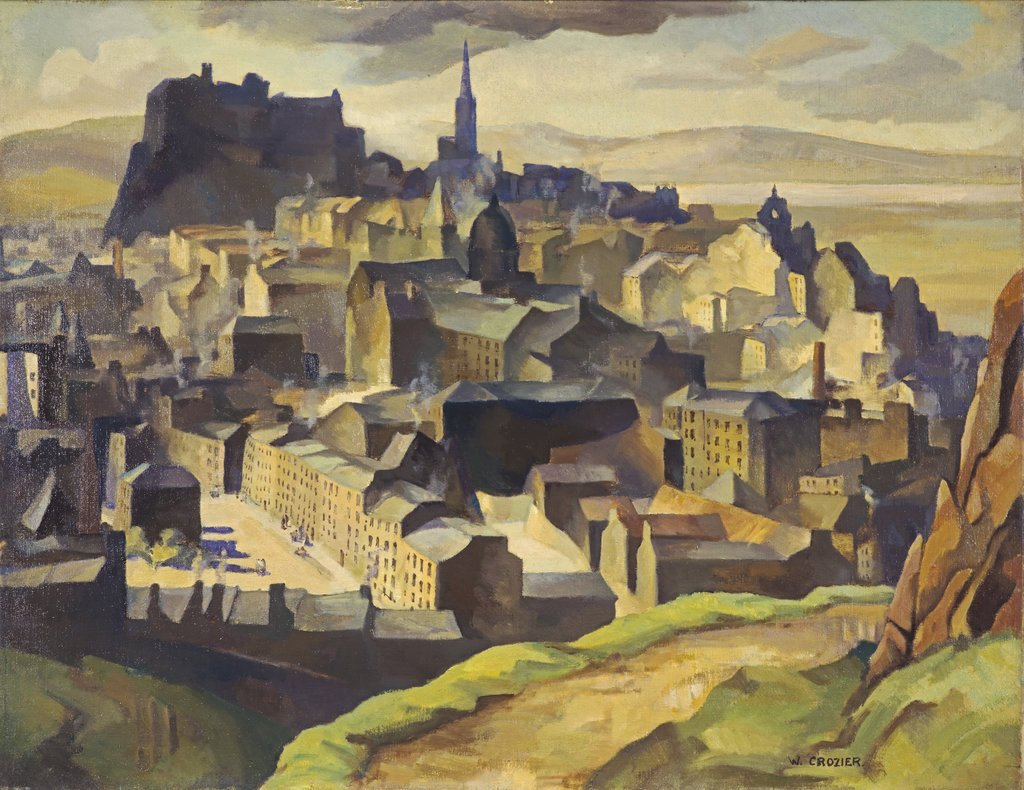
Edinburgh (from Salisbury Crags) by William Crozier, a painter associated with The Edinburgh School

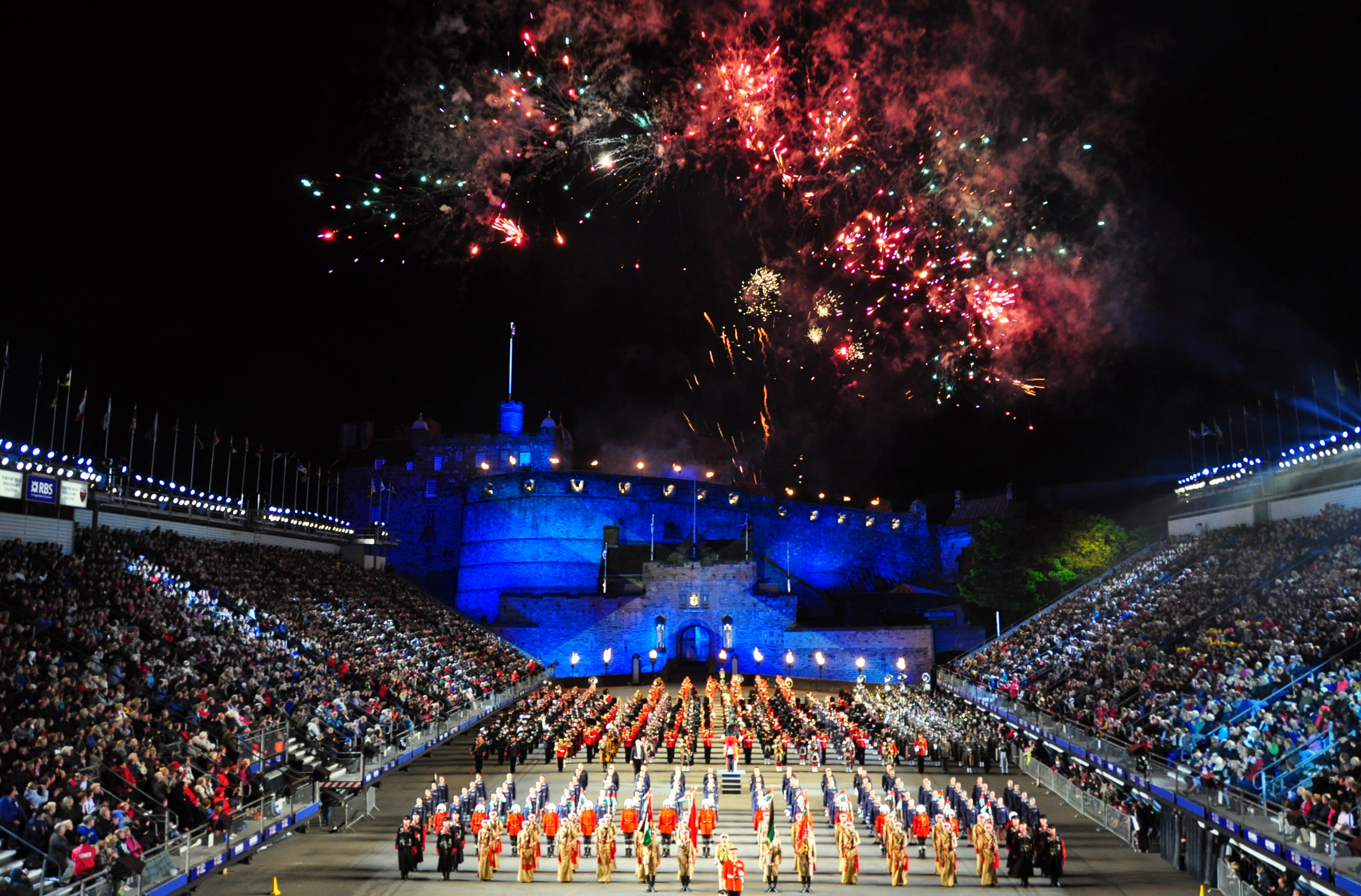
Royal Edinburgh Military Tattoo, 2010

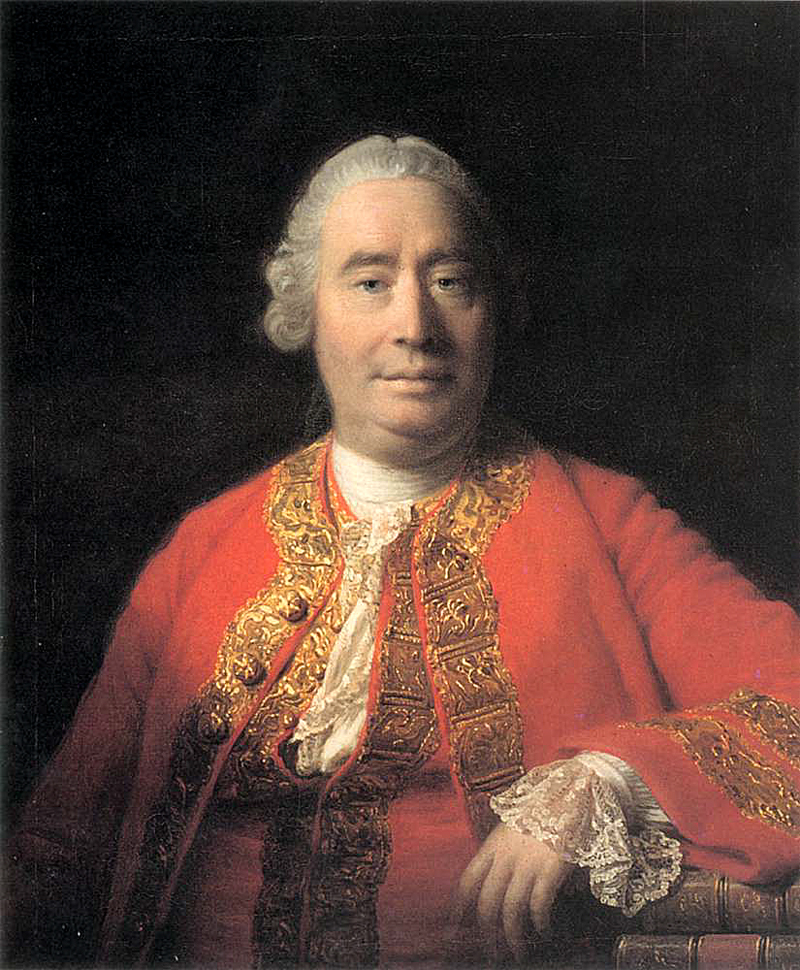
David Hume, Scottish philosopher, historian, economist, and essayist born in Edinburgh in 1711

Edinburgh in art / Paintings of Edinburgh

Art in Edinburgh

- The Edinburgh School
- Public art in Edinburgh
  - Lion of Scotland
  - The Manuscript of Monte Cassino

Cuisine of Edinburgh

- Beer in Edinburgh
- Edinburgh rock

Events in Edinburgh

- Edinburgh's Hogmanay

Festivals in Edinburgh

- Edinburgh festivals
  - Royal Edinburgh Military Tattoo

Languages of Edinburgh

- English language
- Scottish English

Media in Edinburgh

- Newspapers in Edinburgh
  - Edinburgh Evening News
  - The Edinburgh Gazette
  - The Scotsman
- Radio and television in Edinburgh
  - STV2

People from Edinburgh

- Notable residents
- People from Edinburgh
  - David Hume
  - Alexander Nasmyth
  - William Henry Playfair

=== Religion in Edinburgh ===
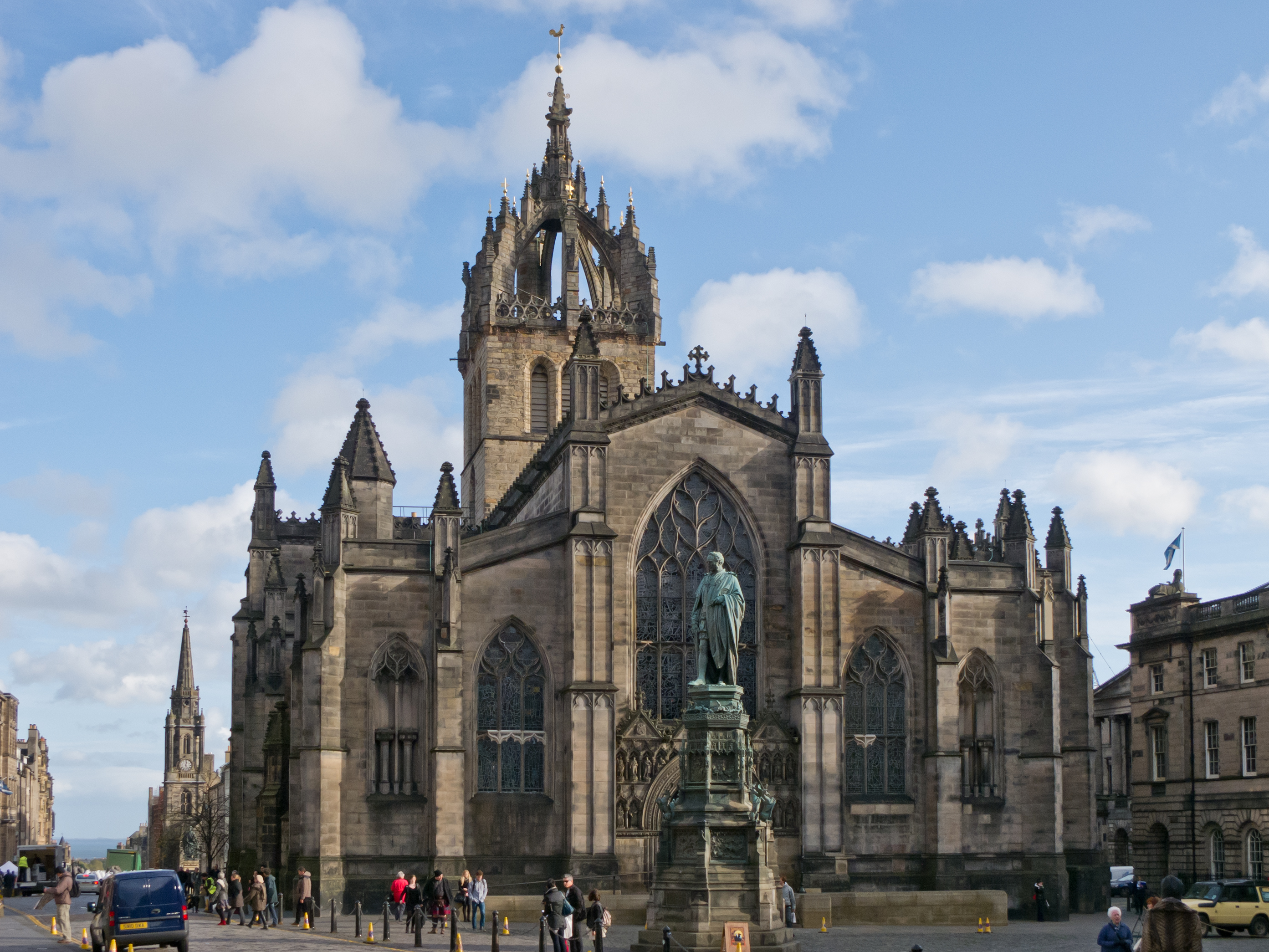
St Giles' Cathedral, the principal place of worship of the Church of Scotland in Edinburgh

Religion in Edinburgh

- Catholicism in Edinburgh
  - Roman Catholic Archdiocese of St Andrews and Edinburgh
    - St Mary's Cathedral
- Protestantism in Edinburgh
  - Church of Scotland
    - Church of Scotland offices
    - St Giles' Cathedral
- Islam in Edinburgh
  - Edinburgh Central Mosque

=== Sports in Edinburgh ===
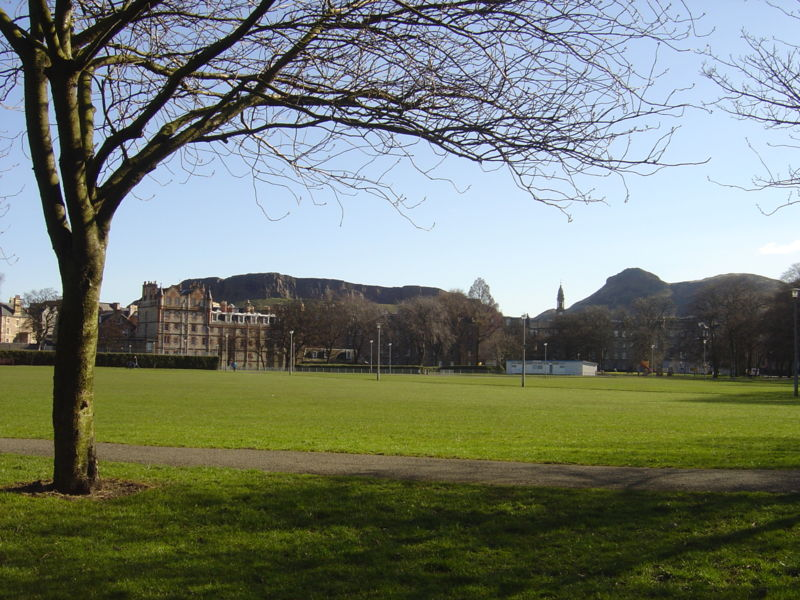
The Meadows, where the first Edinburgh derby was played

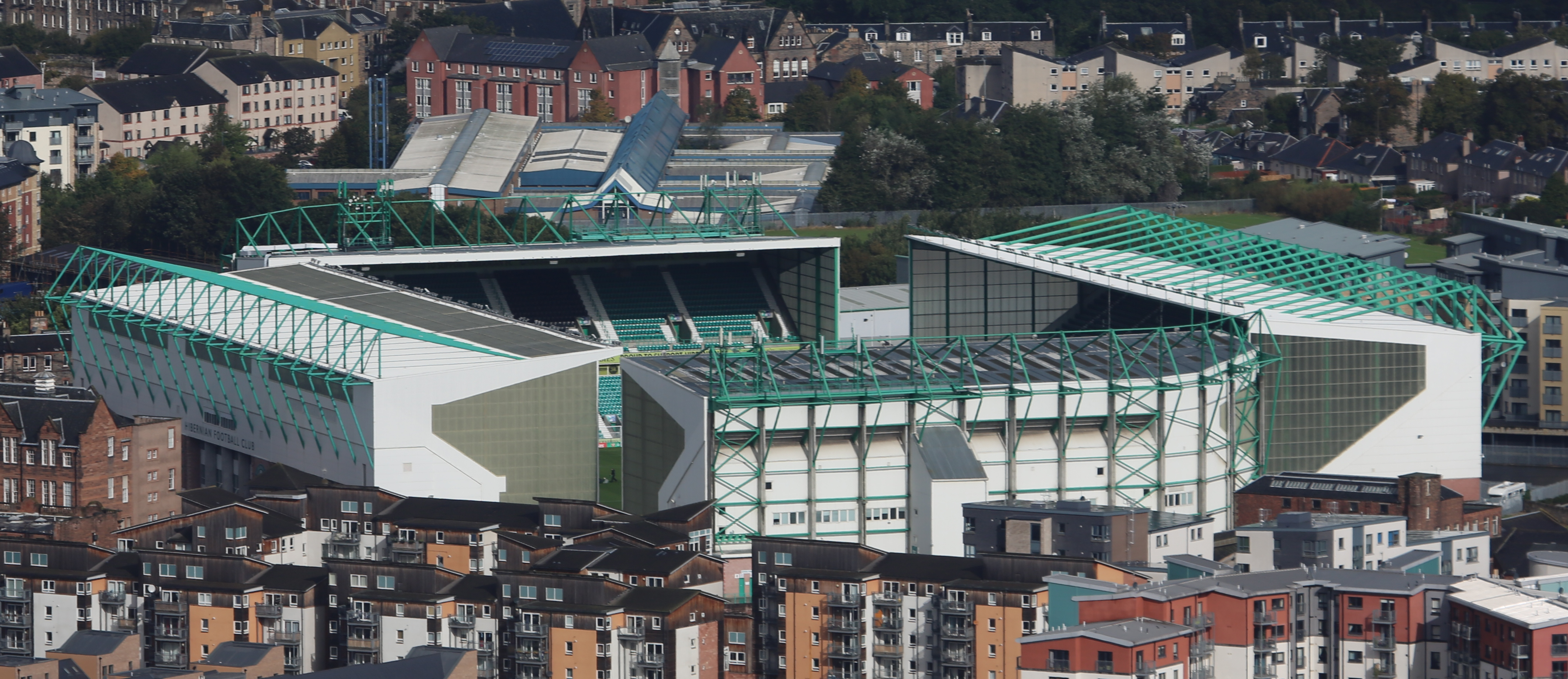
Easter Road football stadium

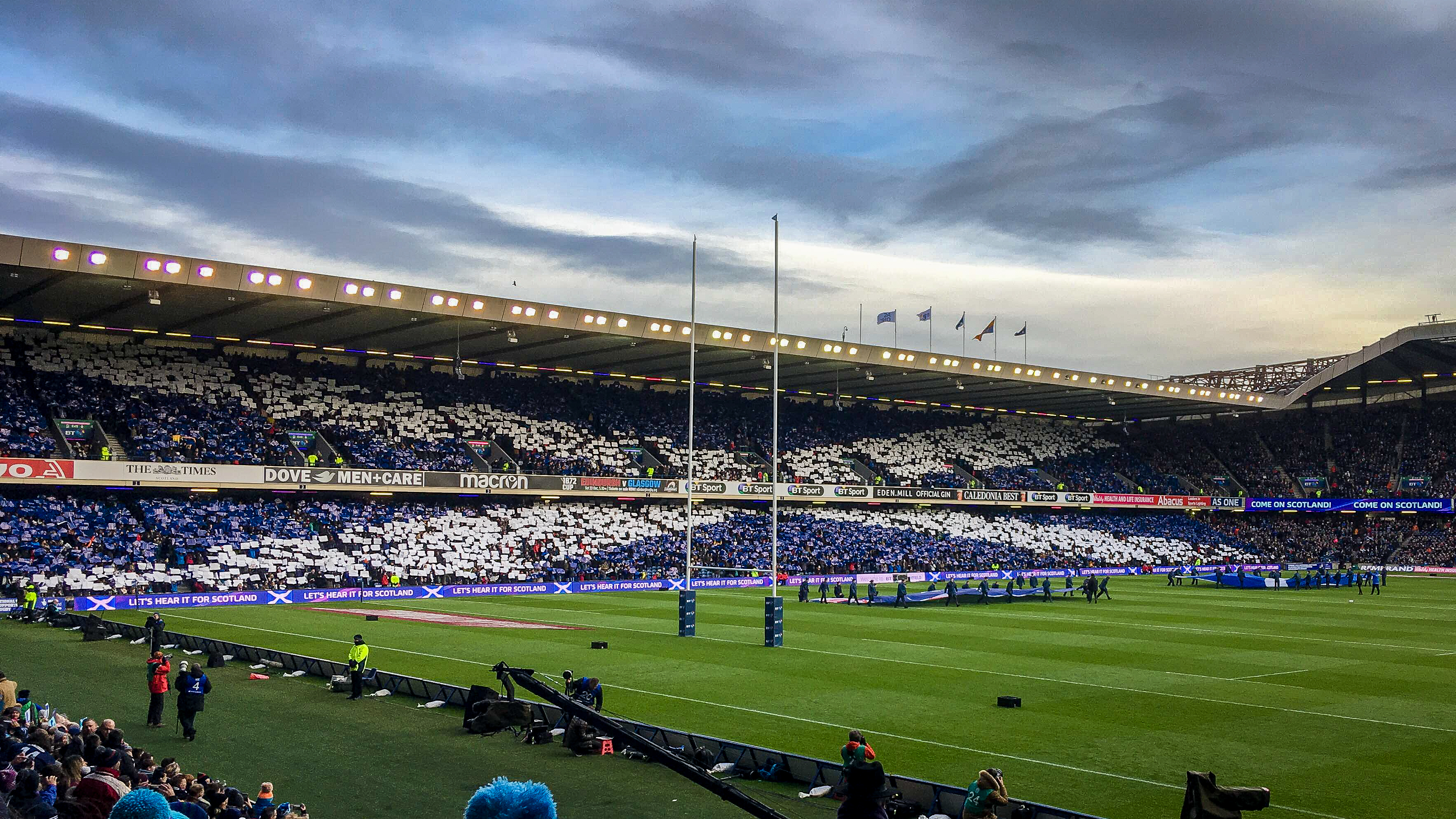
Murrayfield Stadium

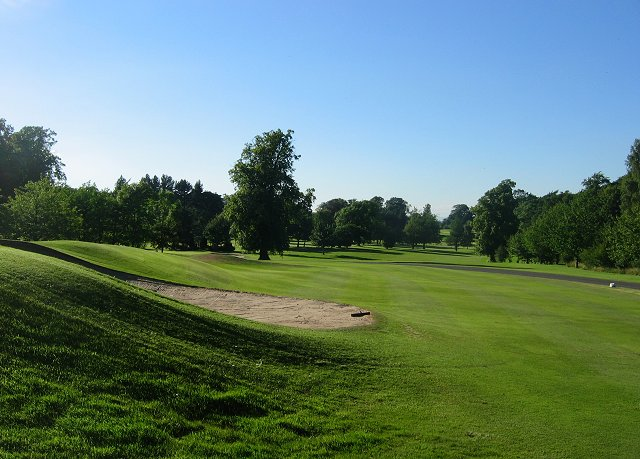
Ratho Park Golf Club

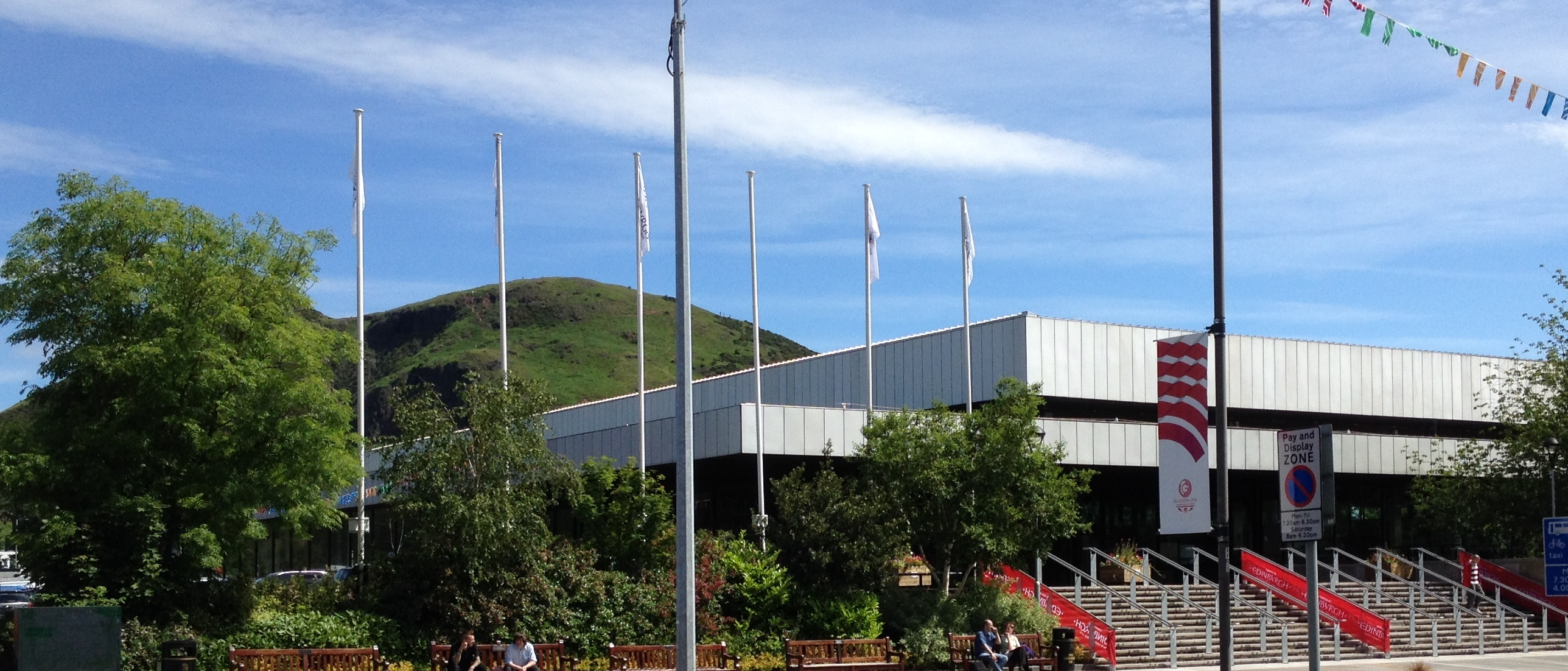
The Royal Commonwealth Pool

Sport in Edinburgh

- Baseball in Edinburgh
  - Edinburgh Diamond Devils
- Cricket in Edinburgh
  - Scotland national cricket team
- Football in Edinburgh
  - Association football in Edinburgh
    - Edinburgh derby
      - Edinburgh City F.C.
      - Heart of Midlothian F.C. (women's team)
      - Hibernian F.C. (women's team)
      - Spartans F.C. (women's team)
  - Rugby football in Edinburgh
    - Edinburgh Rugby
    - Scotland national rugby union team
- Ice hockey in Edinburgh
  - Edinburgh Capitals
- Sports competitions in Edinburgh
  - Edinburgh Marathon
- Sports venues in Edinburgh
  - Ainslie Park
  - Easter Road
  - Goldenacre Sports Ground
  - Ingliston Racing Circuit
  - Inverleith Sports Ground
  - Meadowbank Stadium
  - Meggetland Sports Complex
  - Murrayfield Ice Rink
  - Murrayfield Stadium
  - Myreside Cricket Ground
  - Myreside Stadium
  - The Grange Club
  - The Royal Burgess Golfing Society of Edinburgh
  - Royal Commonwealth Pool
  - Tynecastle Park

== Economy and infrastructure of Edinburgh ==
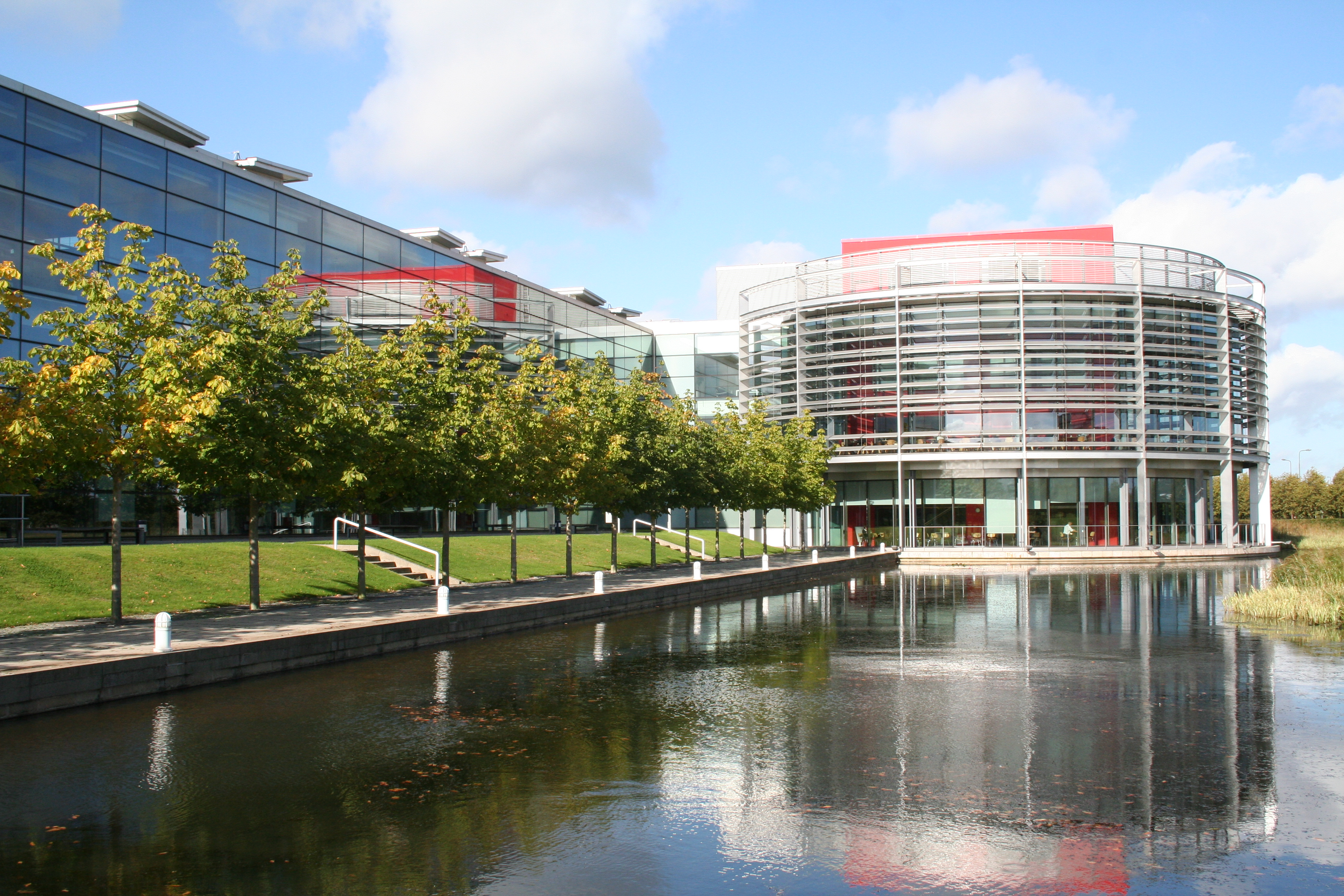
The BT building in Edinburgh Park

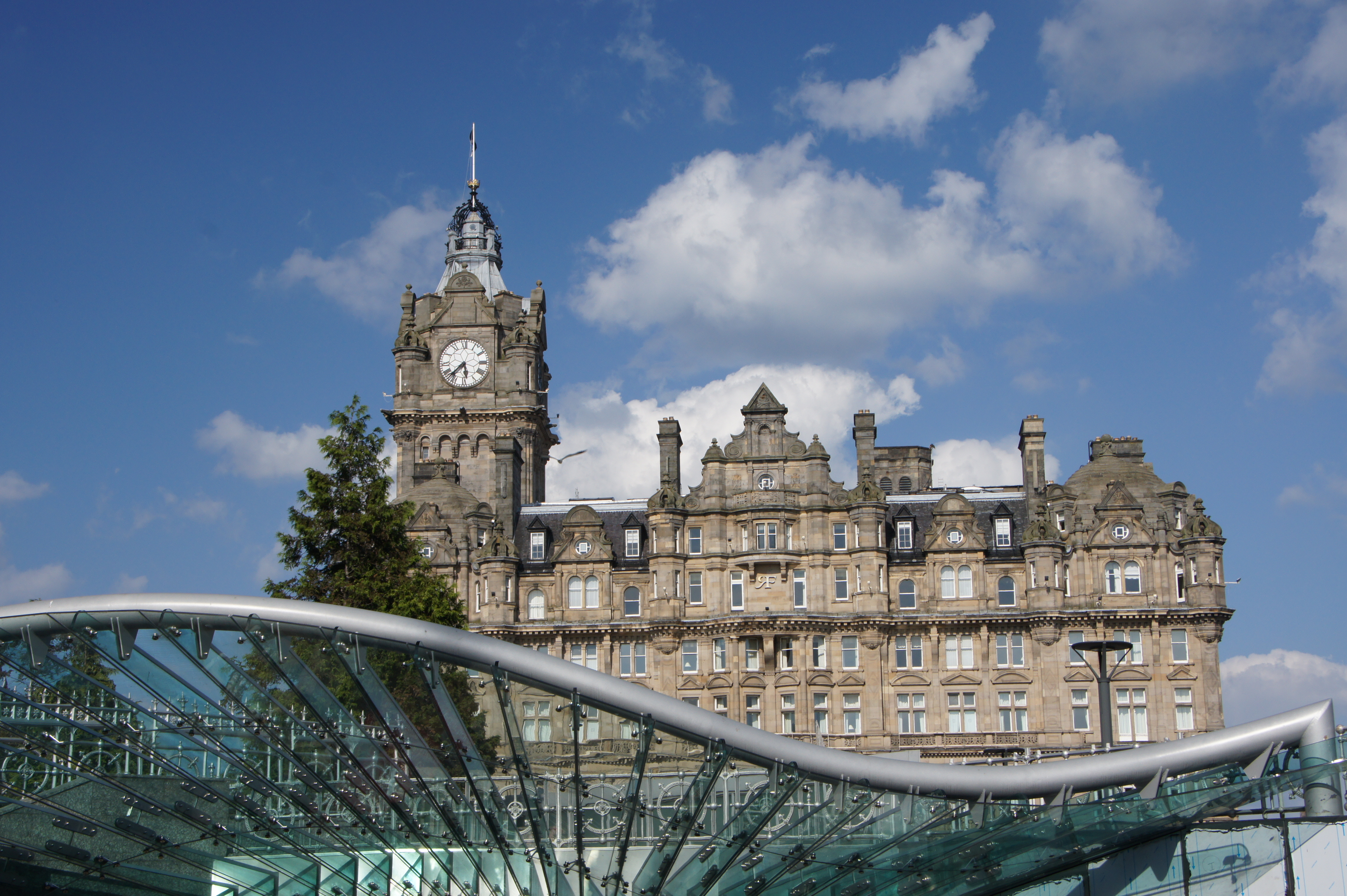
The Balmoral Hotel, a luxury five-star hotel and a landmark of Edinburgh

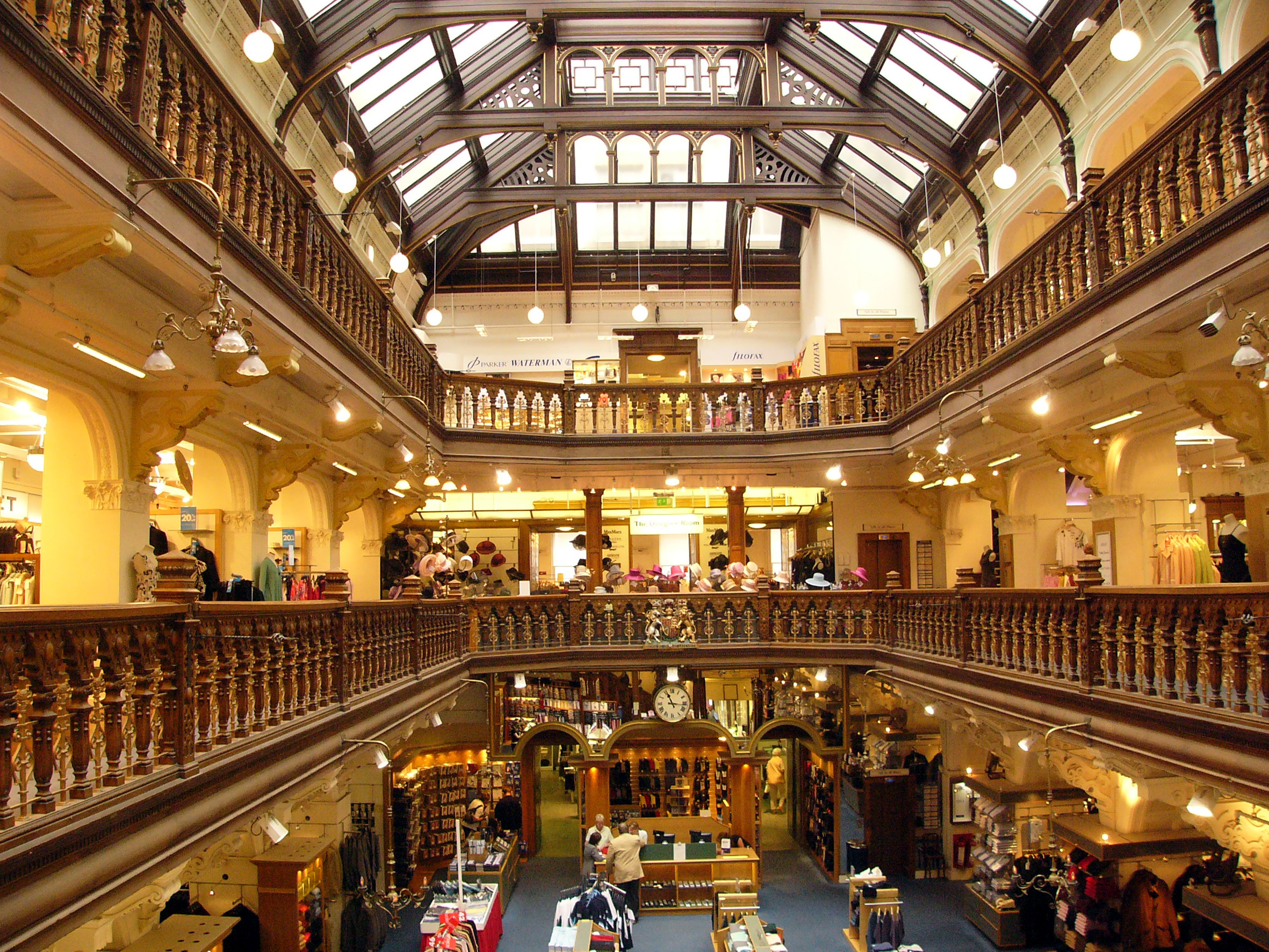
Jenners Department Store, the oldest department store in Scotland

Economy of Edinburgh

- Business parks in Edinburgh
  - Edinburgh Park
- Financial services in Edinburgh
  - Edinburgh Stock Exchange
  - Royal Bank of Scotland
  - Scottish Widows
- Hotels and resorts in Edinburgh
  - Balmoral Hotel
  - The Dunstane
  - Prestonfield House
  - The Principal Edinburgh George Street
  - The Scotsman Hotel
  - Waldorf Astoria Edinburgh - The Caledonian
  - Waterloo Hotel
- Restaurants and cafés in Edinburgh
  - Forest Café
  - The Kitchin
  - The Witchery by the Castle
- Shopping malls and markets in Edinburgh
  - Shopping malls in Edinburgh
    - The Gyle Shopping Centre
    - Jenners
    - Ocean Terminal
    - Waverley Market
- Tourism in Edinburgh
  - Tourist attractions in Edinburgh

=== Transportation in Edinburgh ===
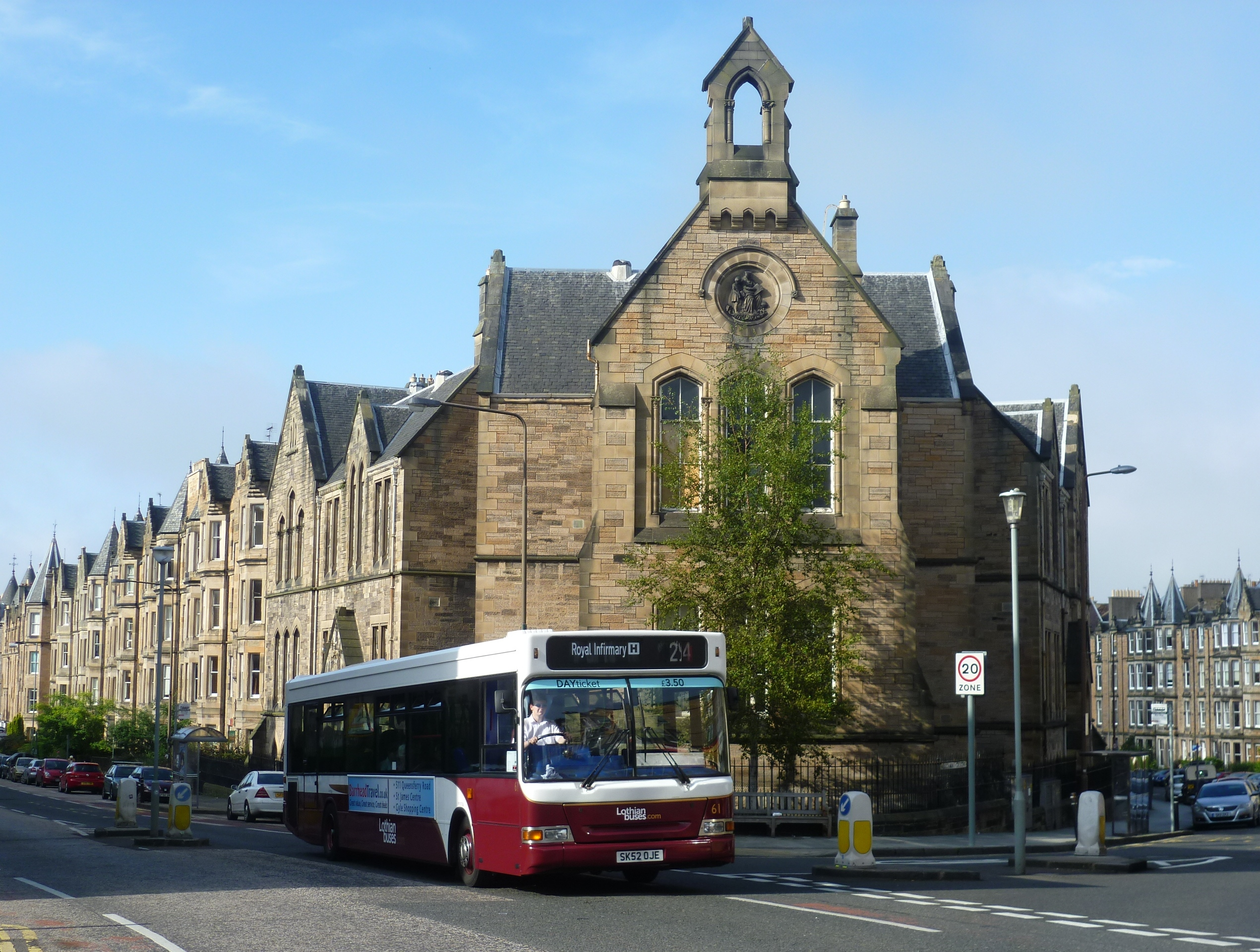
A Dennis Dart SPD in Marchmont

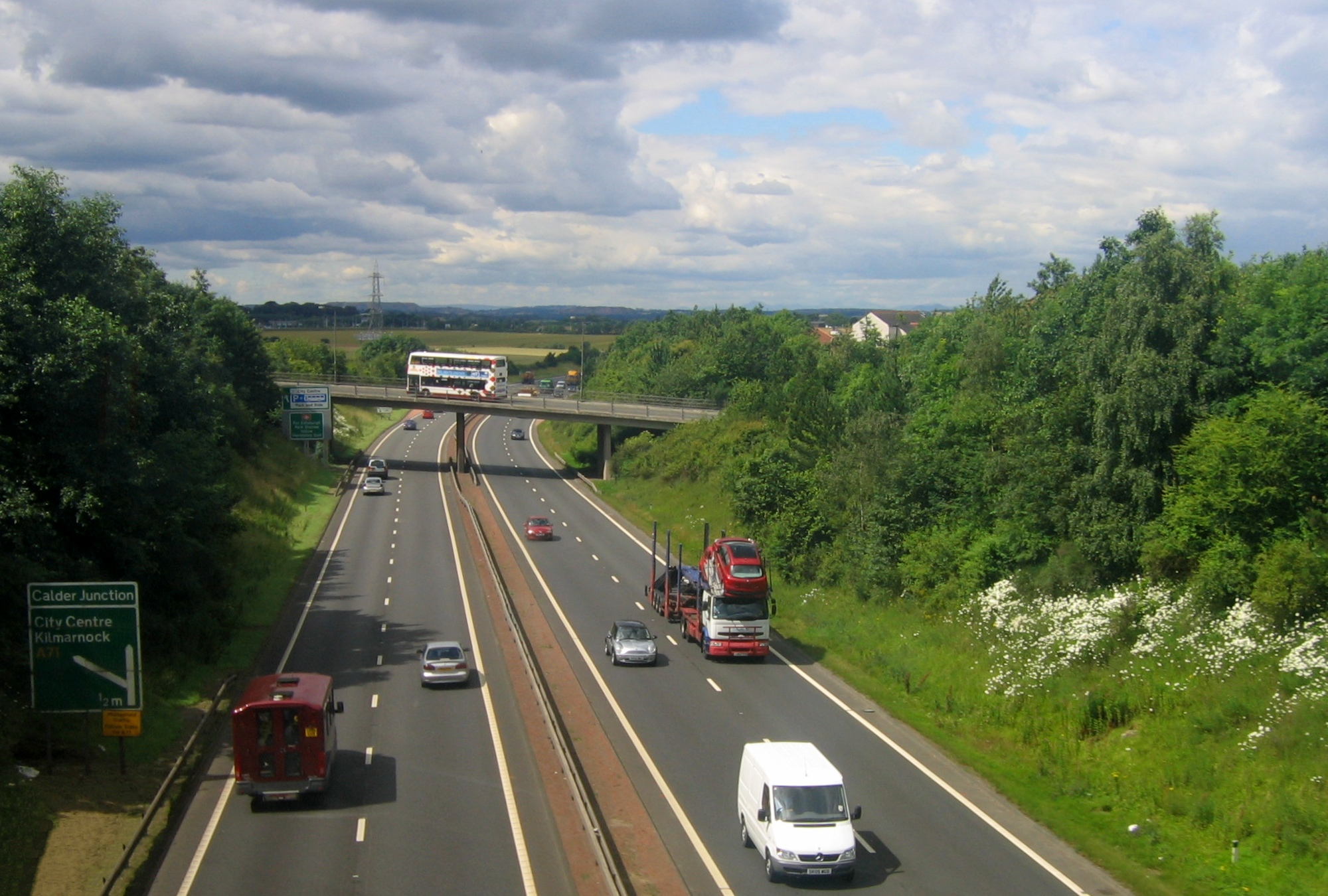
Edinburgh City Bypass near Wester Hailes

Public transport in Edinburgh

- Air transport in Edinburgh
  - Airports in Edinburgh
    - Edinburgh Airport
- Maritime transport in Edinburgh
  - Waterways in Edinburgh
    - Union Canal
- Road transport in Edinburgh
  - Buses in Edinburgh
    - Edinburgh Bus Station
    - Lothian Buses
  - Cycling in Edinburgh
  - Roads in Edinburgh
    - Road network
      - Edinburgh City Bypass

==== Rail transport in Edinburgh ====
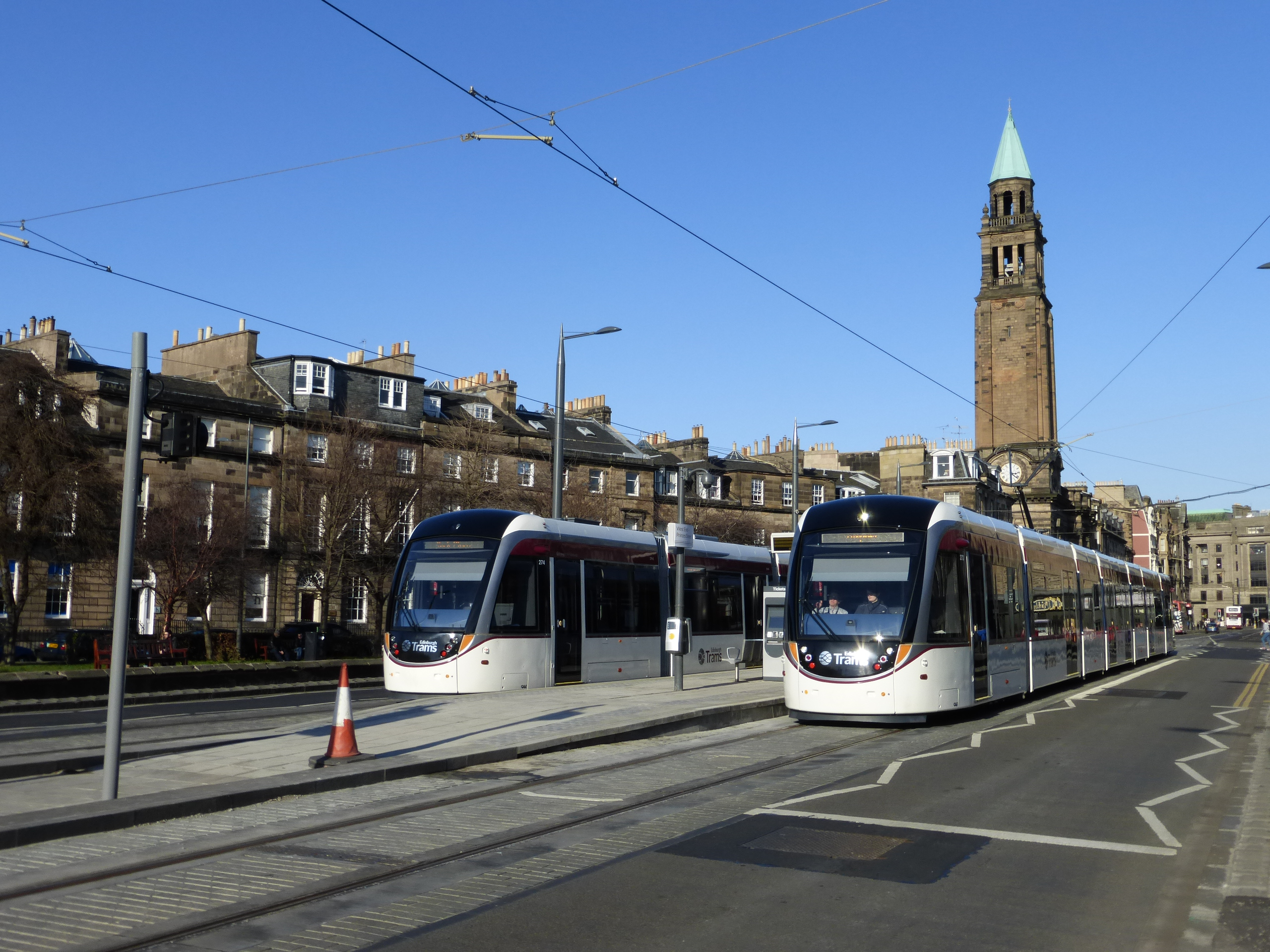
Two Edinburgh Trams seen at the West End - Princes Street stop

Rail transport in Edinburgh

- Edinburgh Airport Rail Link (proposed line)
- Railway stations in Edinburgh
  - Edinburgh Park railway station
  - Edinburgh Waverley railway station
  - Haymarket railway station
- Trams in Edinburgh
  - Edinburgh Trams
    - Edinburgh Tram Inquiry
    - Edinburgh Tram (vehicle)
    - Proposals for new tram lines in Edinburgh

== Education in Edinburgh ==
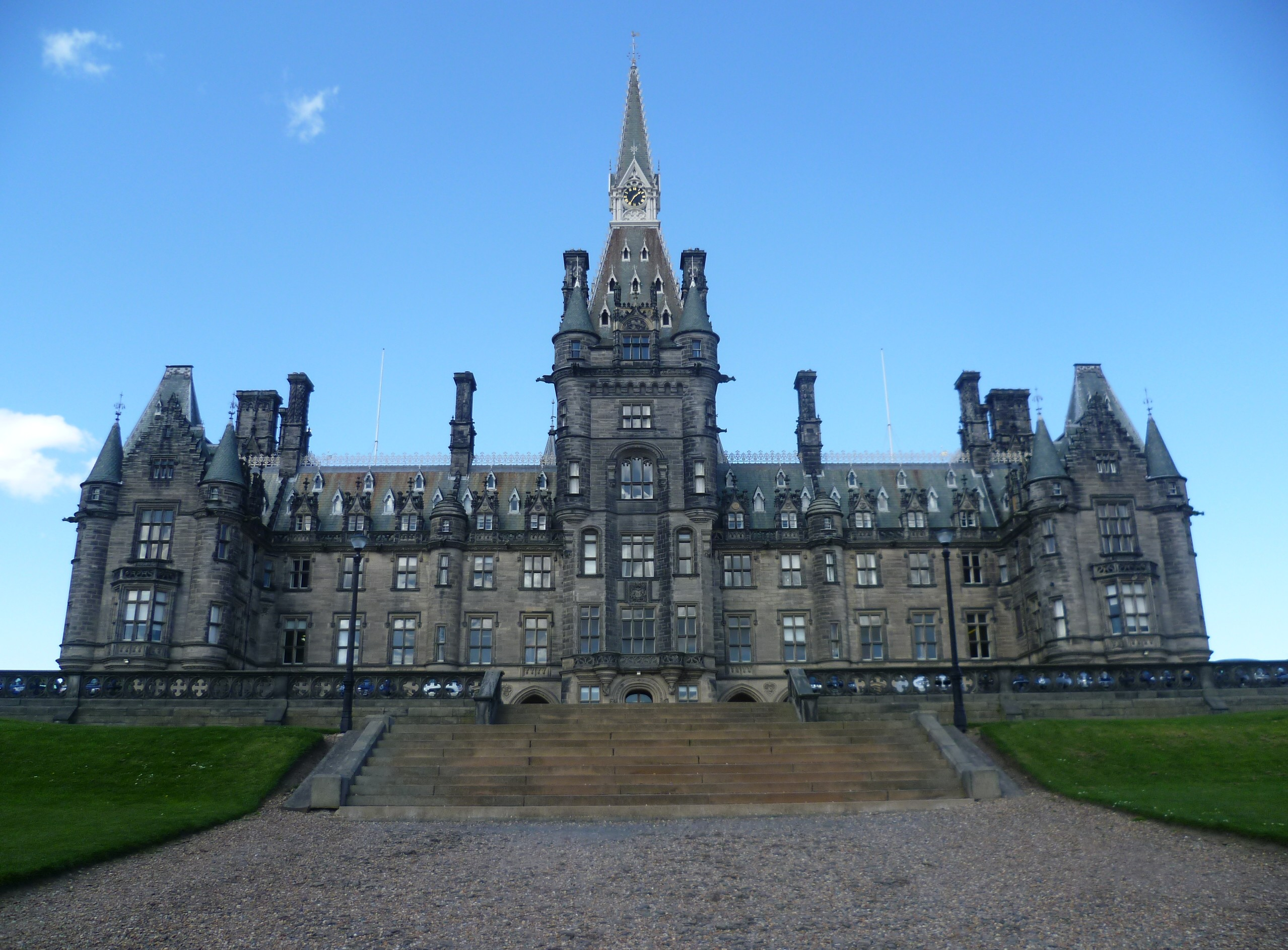
Fettes College

Education in Edinburgh

- Schools in Edinburgh
- Universities and colleges in Edinburgh
  - Edinburgh Napier University
  - Heriot-Watt University
  - University of Edinburgh
- Research institutes in Edinburgh
  - Transport Research Institute

== Healthcare in Edinburgh ==
Healthcare in Edinburgh

- Hospitals in Edinburgh
  - Astley Ainslie Hospital
  - Chalmers Hospital
  - Royal Infirmary of Edinburgh
  - Western General Hospital
- Research centres in Edinburgh
  - Edinburgh Cancer Research Centre

== See also ==
- Autonomous Centre of Edinburgh
- Edinburgh Coalition Against Poverty
- Outline of geography
