= 2022 City of Edinburgh Council election =

City of Edinburgh Council election

- 5 May 2022

All 63 seats to City of Edinburgh Council 32 seats needed for a majority
- Registered: 399,239
- Turnout: 47.2%
	First party	Second party	Third party
Leader	Adam McVey	Cammy Day	Robert Aldridge
Party	SNP	Labour	Liberal Democrats
Leader's seat	Leith	Forth	Drum Brae/Gyle
Last election	19 seats, 27.0%	12 seats, 18.4%	6 seats, 13.6%
Seats before	15	11	6
Seats won	19	13	12
Seat change	Steady	▲1	▲6
Popular vote	48,199	35,608	38,263
Percentage	25.9%	19.1%	20.6%
Swing	▼1.1%	▲0.8%	▲6.9%
	Fourth party	Fifth party
Leader	Steve Burgess / Claire Miller (co-conveners)	Iain Whyte
Party	Green	Conservative
Leader's seat	Southside/ Newington (Burgess); City Centre (Miller)	Craigentinny/ Duddingston
Last election	8 seats, 12.4%	18 seats, 27.7%
Seats before	7	17
Seats won	10	9
Seat change	▲2	▼9
Popular vote	26,411	32,612
Percentage	14.2%	17.5%
Swing	▲1.8%	▼10.2%
- Election result by council wards
Leader before election
Adam McVey
(SNP)
No overall control
Leader after election
Cammy Day
(Labour)
No overall control

Elections to the City of Edinburgh Council took place on 5 May 2022 on the same day as the 31 other Scottish local government elections. As with other Scottish council elections, it was held using single transferable vote (STV) – a form of proportional representation – in which multiple candidates are elected in each ward and voters rank candidates in order of preference.

For the second consecutive elections, the Scottish National Party (SNP) were returned as the largest party with 19 seats albeit with a slightly reduced vote share (down 1.1%). Labour, the Liberal Democrats and the Greens all made gains at the expense of the Conservatives, who fell from the second-largest party to the smallest representative group on the council. Labour overtook the Conservatives into second place as they gained one seat to return 13 councillors. The Liberal Democrats doubled their number of councillors, as they were returned as the third-largest party with 12 seats, while the Greens gained two seats to hold 10. The number of Conservative councillors halved as they fell from 18 seats to nine.

Following the election, the ruling SNP-Labour coalition was replaced by a Labour minority administration supported by the Liberal Democrats and Conservatives.

== Background ==
=== Previous election ===
For the first time, the Scottish National Party (SNP) were returned as the largest party in an election in Edinburgh after increasing their vote share by 0.2% to win 19 seats – an increase of one from 2012. Despite topping the popular vote, the Conservatives only returned 18 seats as they overtook Labour to become the second-largest party on the council. Labour fell from the largest party to third after losing eight seats to return 12 councillors. The Greens recorded their best result in an election in Edinburgh as they returned eight councillors – up two – and the remaining six seats were won by the Liberal Democrats – up three.

2017 City of Edinburgh Council election result
Party	Seats	Vote share
SNP	19	27.0%
Conservatives	18	27.7%
Labour	12	18.4%
Greens	8	12.4%
Liberal Democrats	6	13.6%

=== Electoral system ===
The election used the 17 wards created following the fourth statutory review of electoral arrangements conducted by Local Government Boundary Commission for Scotland in 2007, with 63 councillors elected. Each ward elected either three or four councillors, using the single transferable vote (STV) electoral system – a form of proportional representation – where candidates are ranked in order of preference.

=== Composition ===
Since the previous election, several changes in the composition of the council occurred. Most were changes to the political affiliation of councillors – including SNP councillors Lewis Ritchie, Gavin Barrie, Claire Bridgman and Derek Howie and Conservative councillor Ashley Graczyk – who resigned from their respective parties and became independents. Two by-elections were held and resulted in an SNP gain from Labour and an SNP hold. Green councillor Gavin Corbett resigned from the council after being made a special adviser to the Scottish Government, but as his resignation was less than six months prior to the election, a by-election was not called to replace him.

Composition of the City of Edinburgh Council
Party	2017 election	Dissolution
SNP	19	15
Conservative	18	17
Labour	12	11
Green	8	7
Liberal Democrats	6	6
Independents	0	6

Notes

1. Note 1: A vacancy created less than six months before the election was not filled so there were only 62 councillors prior to the poll.

=== Retiring councillors ===
Retiring councillors
Ward	Party	Retiring councillor
Almond	Conservative	Graham Hutchison
Pentland Hills	Labour	Ricky Henderson
Pentland Hills	Conservative	Sue Webber
Drum Brae/Gyle	Independent	Claire Bridgman
Forth	SNP	Eleanor Bird
Forth	SNP	George Gordon
Inverleith	Independent	Gavin Barrie
Corstorphine/Murrayfield	Conservative	Scott Douglas
Corstorphine/Murrayfield	Liberal Democrats	Gillian Gloyer
Sighthill/Gorgie	Labour	Donald Wilson
Fountainbridge/Craiglockhart	Conservative	Andrew Johnston
Morningside	Conservative	Nick Cook
Morningside	Green	Melanie Main
City Centre	Labour	Karen Doran
City Centre	SNP	Alasdair Rankin
Leith Walk	Independent	Lewis Ritchie
Leith	Labour	Gordon Munro
Craigentinny/Duddingston	Conservative	John McLellan
Craigentinny/Duddingston	SNP	Ethan Young
Southside/Newington	Independent	Alison Dickie
Southside/Newington	Labour	Ian Perry
Liberton/Gilmerton	Independent	Derek Howie
Liberton/Gilmerton	Conservative	Stephanie Smith
Portobello/Craigmillar	Green	Mary Campbell
Portobello/Craigmillar	Labour	Maureen Child
Portobello/Craigmillar	Conservative	Callum Laidlaw

=== Candidates ===
The total number of candidates increased from 120 in 2017 to 143. As was the case five years previous, the SNP fielded the highest number of candidates at 25 (two less than in 2017) across the 17 wards. The Liberal Democrats overtook both Labour and the Conservatives to field the second-largest number of candidates at 22 – an increase of four. Both the Conservatives (20 candidates) and Labour (19) stood fewer candidates than they had in 2017 – a decrease of one and four respectively. The Greens were the only other party to contest all 17 wards as, like they had done at the previous election, they put forward 17 candidates. The number of independent candidates increased from seven in 2017 to 10. As they had done five year previous, the Libertarians contested the election, standing five candidates (up one).

For the first time, the Alba Party (seven candidates), the Women's Equality Party (two), the Workers Party (one), the Communist Party (one) and the Freedom Alliance (one) contested an election in Edinburgh. The Scottish Socialist Party (one) contested an election in Edinburgh for the first time since 2012. As they had in 2017, Socialist Labour put forward one candidate while UKIP – who put forward two candidates in 2017 – did not contest the election.

== Results ==
2022 City of Edinburgh Council election
Party	Seats	Gains	Losses	Net gain/loss	Seats %	Votes %	Votes	+/−
SNP	19	2	2	Steady	30.2	25.9	48,199	▼1.1
Labour	13	1	0	▲1	20.6	19.1	35,608	▲0.7
Liberal Democrats	12	6	0	▲6	19.1	20.5	38,263	▲6.9
Green	10	3	1	▲2	15.9	14.2	26,411	▲1.8
Conservative	9	0	9	▼9	14.3	17.5	32,612	▼10.2
Independent	0	0	0	Steady	0.0	0.9	1,663	▲0.2
Scottish Family	0	0	0	Steady	0.0	0.7	1,355	New
Alba	0	0	0	Steady	0.0	0.6	1,029	New
Scottish Socialist	0	0	0	Steady	0.0	0.2	295	New
Women's Equality	0	0	0	Steady	0.0	0.1	228	New
Scottish Libertarian	0	0	0	Steady	0.0	0.1	202	New
Communist	0	0	0	Steady	0.0	0.1	119	New
Socialist Labour	0	0	0	Steady	0.0	0.1	113	▲0.1
Workers Party	0	0	0	Steady	0.0	0.0	61	New
Freedom Alliance	0	0	0	Steady	0.0	0.0	60	New
Total	63						186,218	

Note: Votes are the sum of first preference votes across all council wards. The net gain/loss and percentage changes relate to the result of the previous Scottish local elections on 4 May 2017. This is because STV has an element of proportionality which is not present unless multiple seats are being elected. This may differ from other published sources showing gain/loss relative to seats held at the dissolution of Scotland's councils.

=== Ward summary ===
Results of the 2022 City of Edinburgh Council election by ward
Ward	%	Seats	%	Seats	%	Seats	%	Seats	%	Seats	%	Seats	Total
Ward	SNP		Lib Dem		Lab		Grn		Con		Others		Total
Almond	20.9	1	59.9	3	4.9	0	5.3	0	7.5	0	1.5	0	4
Pentland Hills	31.3	2	8.0	0	17.1	1	7.8	0	34.0	1	1.7	0	4
Drum Brae/Gyle	23.9	1	51.8	2	6.2	0	5.9	0	11.1	0	1.1	0	3
Forth	31.0	1	19.7	1	18.9	1	12.7	1	15.1	0	2.7	0	4
Inverleith	19.7	1	33.7	1	12.6	0	12.8	1	20.0	1	1.2	0	4
Corstorphine/Murrayfield	18.7	1	49.8	2	7.8	0	6.9	0	16.0	0	0.8	0	3
Sighthill/Gorgie	36.2	2	4.2	0	23.0	1	13.3	1	11.8	0	11.5	0	4
Colinton/Fairmilehead	17.3	1	12.4	0	33.4	1	5.4	0	29.9	1	1.6	0	3
Fountainbridge/Craiglockhart	22.7	1	7.1	0	22.4	1	19.9	0	26.6	1	1.2	0	3
Morningside	15.5	0	21.2	1	23.2	1	21.1	1	17.6	1	1.4	0	4
City Centre	24.5	1	15.1	0	14.6	1	19.8	1	21.4	1	4.5	0	4
Leith Walk	30.7	1	12.0	1	18.7	1	25.9	1	6.9	0	5.7	0	4
Leith	32.6	1	4.3	0	21.4	1	25.7	1	9.0	0	7.0	0	3
Craigentinny/Duddingston	36.7	1	6.7	0	20.6	1	16.5	1	19.4	1			4
Southside/Newington	19.2	1	16.1	1	24.1	1	23.0	1	17.6	0			4
Liberton/Gilmerton	30.7	2	4.1	0	33.3	1	8.2	0	18.0	1	5.7	0	4
Portobello/Craigmillar	37.4	1	4.3	0	23.9	1	16.2	1	15.3	1	2.9	0	4
Total	25.9	19	20.5	12	19.1	13	14.2	10	17.5	9	2.8	0	63

=== Seats changing hands ===
Below is a list of seats which elected a different party or parties from 2017 in order to highlight the change in political composition of the council from the previous election. The list does not include defeated incumbents who resigned or defected from their party and subsequently failed re-election while the party held the seat.

Seats changing hands
Seat	2017		2022	
Seat	Party	Member	Party	Member
Almond	Conservative	Graham Hutchison	Liberal Democrats	Lewis James Younie
Pentland Hills	Conservative	Sue Webber	SNP	Fiona Glasgow
Drum Brae/Gyle	Conservative	Mark Brown	Liberal Democrats	Edward John Thornley
Forth	Conservative	Jim Campbell	Liberal Democrats	Sanne Dijkstra-Downie
Forth	SNP	George Gordon	Greens	Kayleigh O'Neill
Inverleith	Conservative	Iain Whyte	Greens	Jule Bandel
Corstorphine/Murrayfield	Conservative	Scott Douglas	Liberal Democrats	Euan Robert Davidson
Sighthill/Gorgie	Conservative	Ashley Graczyk	Greens	Dan Heap
Colinton/Fairmilehead	Conservative	Philip Doggart	SNP	Marco Biagi
Fountainbridge/Craiglockhart	Greens	Gavin Corbett	Labour	Val Walker
Leith Walk	SNP	Rob Munn	Liberal Democrats	Jack Caldwell
Southside/Newington	Conservative	Cameron Rose	Liberal Democrats	Pauline Flannery

Notes

1. Note 1: In 2017, Ashley Graczyk was elected as a Conservative candidate but later resigned from the party.

== Ward results ==
=== Almond ===
The Liberal Democrats (2) and the SNP (1) retained the seats they had won at the previous election while the Conservatives lost their only seat to the Liberal Democrats.

Almond - 4 seats
Party	Candidate	FPv%	Count							
Party	Candidate	FPv%	1	2	3	4	5	6	7	8
Liberal Democrats	Kevin Lang (incumbent)	42.4	5,904							
SNP	Norrie Work (incumbent)	20.9	2,911							
Liberal Democrats	Louise Young (incumbent)	16.0	2,221	4,937						
Conservative	James Hill	7.5	1,040	1,162	1,242	1,244	1,245	1,290	1,355	1,416
Green	Andrew Brough	5.3	736	799	852	918	938	958	1,187	
Labour	Fred Hessler	4.9	688	742	786	803	816	837		
Liberal Democrats	Lewis James Younie	1.4	200	313	2,207	2,218	2,223	2,251	2,435	2,870
Scottish Family	Stewart Geddes	1.1	148	153	160	162	174			
Workers Party	Annemarie Baillie	0.4	61	65	67	69				
Electorate: 27,454 Valid: 13,909 Spoilt: 115 Quota: 2,782 Turnout: 51.1%

=== Pentland Hills ===
The SNP and Labour retained the seats they had won at the previous election while the Conservatives retained one of their two seats and lost one seat to the SNP.

Pentland Hills - 4 seats
Party	Candidate	FPv%	Count								
Party	Candidate	FPv%	1	2	3	4	5	6	7	8	9
Conservative	Graeme Bruce (incumbent)	22.8	2,531								
SNP	Neil Thomas Gardiner (incumbent)	21.3	2,360								
Labour	Stephen Philip Jenkinson	17.1	1,896	1,911	1,917	1,918	1,944	2,155	2,632		
Conservative	Emma Gilchrist	11.2	1,239	1,482	1,484	1,487	1,532	1,558	1,760	1,827	
SNP	Fiona Glasgow	10.1	1,115	1,121	1,236	1,239	1,254	1,674	1,755	1,841	1,994
Liberal Democrats	Michael William Chappell	8.0	885	909	911	918	940	1,094			
Green	Ross Muller	7.8	870	875	883	890	908				
Scottish Family	Richard Fettes	1.4	159	165	166	172					
Scottish Libertarian	Louis Rowlands	0.3	32	32	33						
Electorate: 24,312 Valid: 11,087 Spoilt: 179 Quota: 2,218 Turnout: 46.3%

=== Drum Brae/Gyle ===
The Liberal Democrats and the SNP retained the seats they had won at the previous election while the Conservatives lost their only seat to the Liberal Democrats.

Drum Brae/Gyle - 3 seats
Party	Candidate	FPv%	Count						
Party	Candidate	FPv%	1	2	3	4	5	6	7
Liberal Democrats	Robert Christopher Aldridge (incumbent)	42.2	3,988						
SNP	Euan Hyslop	23.9	2,263	2,345	2,349	2,355	2,655		
Conservative	Mark Brown (incumbent)	11.1	1,047	1,232	1,235	1,266	1,283	1,296	1,387
Liberal Democrats	Edward John Thornley	9.6	909	2,074	2,079	2,089	2,213	2,263	2,578
Labour	Nkechi Okoro	6.2	587	659	661	671	772	861	
Green	Anne Scott	5.9	554	595	599	616			
Scottish Family	Eileen Johnston	0.8	79	88	94				
Scottish Libertarian	Gary Smith	0.3	24	29					
Electorate: 18,822 Valid: 9,451 Spoilt: 109 Quota: 2,363 Turnout: 50.8%

=== Forth ===
Labour retained the seat they had won at the previous election while the SNP retained one of their two seats and the Conservatives lost their only seat. The Greens and the Liberal Democrats both gained one seat.

Forth - 4 seats
Party	Candidate	FPv%	Count							
Party	Candidate	FPv%	1	2	3	4	5	6	7	8
Liberal Democrats	Sanne Dijkstra-Downie	19.7	2,077	2,094	2,113					
Labour	Cammy Day (incumbent)	18.9	1,995	2,014	2,044	2,044	2,104	2,252		
SNP	Stuart Dobbin	18.2	1,917	1,923	1,938	1,938	3,007			
Conservative	Jim Campbell (incumbent)	15.1	1,594	1,598	1,646	1,646	1,654	1,675	1,701	
SNP	Carrie Gooch	12.8	1,353	1,365	1,369	1,369				
Green	Kayleigh O'Neill	12.7	1,337	1,375	1,390	1,390	1,571	2,014	2,063	2,321
Scottish Family	Linda Lenora Campbell	1.4	152	162						
Women's Equality	Kerry Elizabeth Heathcote	1.2	130							
Electorate: 24,934 Valid: 10,555 Spoilt: 178 Quota: 2,112 Turnout: 43.0%

=== Inverleith ===
The SNP and the Liberal Democrats retained the seats they had won at the previous election while the Conservatives retained one of their two seats and the Greens gained one seat from the Conservatives.

Inverleith - 4 seats
Party	Candidate	FPv%	Count									
Party	Candidate	FPv%	1	2	3	4	5	6	7	8	9	10
Liberal Democrats	Hal Osler (incumbent)	23.2	3,117									
SNP	Vicky Nicolson	19.7	2,641	2,657	2,659	2,663	2,668	2,683	2,937			
Conservative	Max Mitchell (incumbent)	13.7	1,836	1,878	1,879	1,884	1,897	2,644	2,768			
Green	Jule Bandel	12.8	1,714	1,740	1,740	1,741	1,752	1,768	2,222	2,380	2,384	2,959
Labour	Mhairi Munro-Brian	12.6	1,684	1,713	1,715	1,721	1,736	1,755				
Liberal Democrats	Malcolm Alexander Wood	10.5	1,405	1,701	1,703	1,712	1,725	1,765	2,276	2,303	2,338	
Conservative	Stuart Herring	6.4	853	863	863	867	889					
Scottish Family	Phil Holden	0.7	96	97	98	109						
Scottish Libertarian	Tam Laird	0.4	53	54	54							
Independent	Stephen McNamara	0.1	17	17								
Electorate: 24,608 Valid: 13,416 Spoilt: 126 Quota: 2,684 Turnout: 55.0%

=== Corstorphine/Murrayfield ===
The Liberal Democrats and the SNP retained the seats they had won at the previous election while the Conservatives lost their only seat to the Liberal Democrats.

Corstorphine/Murrayfield - 3 seats
Party	Candidate	FPv%	Count					
Party	Candidate	FPv%	1	2	3	4	5	6
Liberal Democrats	Alan Christopher Beal	34.2	3,897					
SNP	Frank Ross (incumbent)	18.7	2,132	2,152	2,163	2,567	2,570	2,941
Conservative	Hugh Findlay	16.0	1,818	1,856	1,878	1,894	1,905	2,015
Liberal Democrats	Euan Robert Davidson	15.6	1,772	2,691	2,716	2,883		
Labour	Richard Parker	7.8	893	918	928	1,090	1,099	
Green	Connal Hughes	6.9	784	804	810			
Scottish Family	Norman David Colville	0.8	88	94				
Electorate: 19,533 Valid: 11,384 Spoilt: 108 Quota: 2,847 Turnout: 58.8%

=== Sighthill/Gorgie ===
The SNP (2) and Labour (1) retained the seats they had won at the previous election while the Greens gained one seat from the Conservatives.

Sighthill/Gorgie - 4 seats
Party	Candidate	FPv%	Count							
Party	Candidate	FPv%	1	2	3	4	5	6	7	8
Labour	Ross McKenzie (Note: Cllr McKenzie resigned from the Labour group in February 2023.)	23.0	1,929							
SNP	Catherine Fullerton (incumbent)	18.7	1,567	1,588	1,618	1,649	1,814			
SNP	Denis Dixon (incumbent)	17.5	1,462	1,480	1,514	1,530	1,592	1,701		
Green	Dan Heap	13.3	1,116	1,151	1,169	1,258	1,520	1,532	1,544	1,762
Conservative	Mark Hooley	11.8	986	1,011	1,023	1,131	1,285	1,286	1,287	
Independent	Ashley Graczyk (incumbent)	9.5	797	820	857	935				
Liberal Democrats	Devin Scobie	4.2	354	421	439					
Alba	David Henry	2.0	164	170						
Electorate: 23,850 Valid: 8,375 Spoilt: 182 Quota: 1,676 Turnout: 35.9%

=== Colinton/Fairmilehead ===
Labour retained the seat they had won at the previous election while the Conservatives retained one of their two seats and the SNP gained one seat from the Conservatives.

Colinton/Fairmilehead - 3 seats
Party	Candidate	FPv%	Count						
Party	Candidate	FPv%	1	2	3	4	5	6	7
Labour	Scott Arthur (incumbent)	33.4	3,812						
Conservative	Jason Rust (incumbent)	20.3	2,317	2,435	2,480	2,507	3,512		
SNP	Marco Biagi	17.3	1,969	2,123	2,142	2,561	2,590	2,614	3,216
Liberal Democrats	Louise Watson Spence	12.4	1,416	1,719	1,739	1,950	2,044	2,329	
Conservative	Neil Cuthbert	9.6	1,100	1,185	1,211	1,221			
Green	Helen McCabe	5.4	621	739	763				
Scottish Family	Richard Crewe Lucas	1.6	179	195					
Electorate: 19,454 Valid: 11,414 Spoilt: 126 Quota: 2,854 Turnout: 59.3%

=== Fountainbridge/Craiglockhart ===
The Conservatives and the SNP retained the seats they had won at the previous election while Labour gained one seat from the Greens.

Fountainbridge/Craiglockhart - 3 seats
Party	Candidate	FPv%	Count						
Party	Candidate	FPv%	1	2	3	4	5	6	7
Conservative	Christopher Cowdy	26.6	2,399						
SNP	David Key (incumbent)	22.7	2,051	2,053	2,058	2,064	2,121	2,145	3,546
Labour	Val Walker	22.4	2,026	2,061	2,067	2,083	2,408		
Green	Megan McHaney	19.9	1,800	1,805	1,812	1,824	1,971	2,026	
Liberal Democrats	Fraser John Ashmore Graham	7.1	642	691	700	719			
Scottish Family	Fraser Kenneth Ramsay	0.8	69	76	85				
Scottish Libertarian	Gregor Masson	0.5	41	44					
Electorate: 18,284 Valid: 9,028 Spoilt: 84 Quota: 2,258 Turnout: 49.8%

=== Morningside ===
Labour, the Liberal Democrats, the Greens and the Conservatives retained the seats they had won at the previous elections.

Morningside - 4 seats
Party	Candidate	FPv%	Count						
Party	Candidate	FPv%	1	2	3	4	5	6	7
Labour	Mandy Helen Watt (incumbent)	23.2	3,145						
Liberal Democrats	Neil John Ross (incumbent)	21.2	2,877						
Green	Ben Parker	21.1	2,854						
Conservative	Marie-Clare Munro	17.6	2,390	2,489	2,560	2,564	2,589	2,616	3,020
SNP	Mairianna Clyde	15.5	2,097	2,209	2,233	2,337	2,343	2,430	
Alba	Leah Gunn Barrett	1.0	132	136	138	140	151		
Scottish Libertarian	Peter Sidor	0.4	52	62	66	67			
Electorate: 25,204 Valid: 13,547 Spoilt: 71 Quota: 2,710 Turnout: 54.0%

=== City Centre ===
The Conservatives, the Greens, Labour and the SNP retained the seats they had won at the previous election.

City Centre - 4 seats
Party	Candidate	FPv%	Count												
Party	Candidate	FPv%	1	2	3	4	5	6	7	8	9	10	11	12	13
Conservative	Jo Mowat (incumbent)	21.4	1,896												
Green	Claire Miller (incumbent)	19.8	1,755	1,760	1,760	1,761	1,765	1,770	1,784						
Liberal Democrats	Andy Foxall	15.1	1,341	1,396	1,396	1,398	1,402	1,415	1,422	1,423	1,449	1,476	1,495	1,551	
Labour	Margaret Arma Graham	14.6	1,297	1,315	1,318	1,318	1,319	1,326	1,333	1,336	1,348	1,385	1,471	1,570	2,349
SNP	Finlay McFarlane	13.3	1,182	1,183	1,185	1,187	1,190	1,191	1,203	1,206	1,210	1,237	2,120		
SNP	Marianne Mwiki	11.1	984	985	987	987	988	990	1,004	1,008	1,011	1,033			
Independent	Bonnie Prince Bob	1.3	117	119	119	119	121	125	153	153	182				
Alba	Kevan Shaw	1.2	105	106	108	108	109	110							
Independent	Norrie Rowan	0.9	84	90	90	97	100	114	126	126					
Independent	Kevin Illingworth	0.6	50	52	52	52	58								
Independent	Pete Carson	0.2	21	22	23	24									
Independent	Paul R. Penman	0.2	14	16	18										
Independent	Maria Pakpahan-Campbell	0.1	11	12											
Electorate: 23,510 Valid: 8,857 Spoilt: 81 Quota: 1,772 Turnout: 37.7%

=== Leith Walk ===
The Greens and Labour retained the seats they had won at the previous election while the SNP retained one of their two seats and the Liberal Democrats gained one seat from the SNP.

Leith Walk - 4 seats
Party	Candidate	FPv%	Count											
Party	Candidate	FPv%	1	2	3	4	5	6	7	8	9	10	11	12
Green	Susan Rae (incumbent)	25.9	2,847											
SNP	Amy McNeese-Mechan (incumbent)	20.4	2,248											
Labour	James Dalgleish	18.7	2,058	2,184	2,186	2,186	2,196	2,224						
Liberal Democrats	Jack Caldwell	12.0	1,317	1,400	1,402	1,413	1,433	1,446	1,456	1,469	1,506	1,563	1,995	2,513
SNP	Rob Munn (incumbent)	10.3	1,132	1,405	1,447	1,449	1,459	1,485	1,488	1,534	1,580	1,633	1,648	
Conservative	Bonus Fombo	6.9	763	766	766	770	796	797	799	811	819	833		
Alba	Joe Smith	1.2	135	138	138	144	148	155	155					
Communist	Richard Charles Shillcock	1.1	119	141	141	145	147							
Socialist Labour	David Don Jacobson	1.0	113	139	139	141	148	184	187	206	242			
Scottish Family	Niel Deepnarain	1.0	106	108	108	119								
Women's Equality	David Renton	0.9	98	147	147	154	167	180	181	202				
Freedom Alliance (UK)	Jon Pullman	0.5	60	62	62									
Electorate: 26,683 Valid: 10,996 Spoilt: 134 Quota: 2,200 Turnout: 41.7%

=== Leith ===
The SNP, the Greens and Labour retained the seats they had won at the previous election.

Leith - 3 seats
Party	Candidate	FPv%	Count				
Party	Candidate	FPv%	1	2	3	4	5
SNP	Adam McVey (incumbent)	32.6	2,754				
Green	Chas Booth (incumbent)	25.7	2,169				
Labour	Katrina Faccenda	21.4	1,804	2,025	2,056	2,077	2,111
Conservative	Teresa Perchard	9.0	764	773	774	793	806
Independent	Andy MacKenzie	4.4	370	413	418	439	513
Liberal Democrats	Robin Thomas Rea	4.3	360	434	443	448	470
Alba	Euan McGlynn	1.5	129	206	208	214	
Scottish Family	Jacqueline Mary Isseri	1.1	92	103	104		
Electorate: 19,420 Valid: 8,442 Spoilt: 104 Quota: 2,111 Turnout: 44.0%

=== Craigentinny/Duddingston ===
Labour, the SNP, the Conservatives and the Greens retained the seats they had won at the previous election.

Craigentinny/Duddingston - 4 seats
Party	Candidate	FPv%	Count					
Party	Candidate	FPv%	1	2	3	4	5	6
Labour	Joan Griffiths (incumbent)	20.6	2,136					
SNP	Danny Aston	20.6	2,129					
Conservative	Iain Whyte (Note: Sitting councillor for Inverleith.)	19.4	2,011	2,020	2,020	2,199		
Green	Alex Staniforth (incumbent)	16.5	1,706	1,719	1,723	1,938	1,956	3,286
SNP	Shelly-Ann Brown	16.2	1,674	1,682	1,732	1,833	1,838	
Liberal Democrats	Elaine Ruth Ford	6.7	697	716	717			
Electorate: 23,924 Valid: 10,353 Spoilt: 215 Quota: 2,071 Turnout: 44.2%

=== Southside/Newington ===
Labour, the Greens and the SNP retained the seats they had won at the previous election while the Liberal Democrats gained one seat from the Conservatives.

Southside/Newington - 4 seats
Party	Candidate	FPv%	Count				
Party	Candidate	FPv%	1	2	3	4	5
Labour	Tim Pogson	24.1	2,837				
Green	Steve Burgess (incumbent)	23.0	2,717				
SNP	Simita Kumar	19.2	2,260	2,338	2,557		
Conservative	Cameron Rose (incumbent)	17.6	2,077	2,139	2,146	2,154	
Liberal Democrats	Pauline Flannery	16.1	1,897	2,141	2,236	2,331	3,739
Electorate: 24,152 Valid: 11,788 Spoilt: 96 Quota: 2,358 Turnout: 49.2%

=== Liberton/Gilmerton ===
The SNP (2), Labour (1) and the Conservatives (1) retained the seats they had won at the previous election.

Liberton/Gilmerton - 4 seats
Party	Candidate	FPv%	Count									
Party	Candidate	FPv%	1	2	3	4	5	6	7	8	9	10
Labour	Lezley Marion Cameron (incumbent)	27.5	3,419									
SNP	Lesley MacInnes (incumbent)	23.4	2,906									
Conservative	Philip Doggart (Note: Sitting councillor for Colinton/Fairmilehead.)	18.0	2,239	2,313	2,317	2,374	2,389	2,414	2,537			
Green	John Nichol	8.2	1,023	1,069	1,092	1,111	1,138	1,227	1,357	1,361		
SNP	Martha Mattos Coelho	7.3	910	942	1,300	1,317	1,369	1,451	1,484	1,485	2,103	2,558
Labour	Ishrat Measom	5.8	725	1,308	1,314	1,339	1,370	1,433	1,604	1,617	1,947	
Liberal Democrats	Madeleine Rani Frances Planche	4.1	507	548	551	565	580	608				
Scottish Socialist	Colin Fox	2.4	295	321	325	335	376					
Alba	Abu Meron	1.8	222	226	228	241						
Scottish Family	James Demare Christie	1.5	187	207	209							
Electorate: 28,977 Valid: 12,433 Spoilt: 232 Quota: 2,487 Turnout: 43.7%

=== Portobello/Craigmillar ===
The SNP, Labour, the Greens and the Conservatives retained the seats they had won at the previous election.

Portobello/Craigmillar - 4 seats
Party	Candidate	FPv%	Count								
Party	Candidate	FPv%	1	2	3	4	5	6	7	8	9
SNP	Kate Campbell (incumbent)	30.7	3,438								
Labour	Jane Elizabeth Meagher	18.8	2,099	2,192	2,212	2,429					
Green	Alys Mumford	16.2	1,808	1,998	2,007	2,037	2,039	2,169	2,349		
Conservative	Tim Jones	15.3	1,712	1,729	1,743	1,776	1,777	1,869	1,986	1,990	2,290
SNP	Simon Clark Shedden	6.7	744	1,534	1,574	1,593	1,593	1,616	1,710	1,770	
Labour	Heather Pugh	5.2	578	597	607	629	638	774			
Liberal Democrats	Jill Reilly	4.3	480	488	495	527	528				
Independent	Andrew McDonald	1.6	182	197	221						
Alba	Anne Todd	1.3	142	149							
Electorate: 26,118 Valid: 11,183 Spoilt: 243 Quota: 2,237 Turnout: 43.7%

== Aftermath ==
After the election, the SNP remained the largest party, but Labour took control of the council after giving the Liberal Democrats and Conservatives "key non-political" posts. In a sign of internal unease at the deal, Labour councillors Katrina Faccenda and Ross McKenzie abstained. This came after a coalition between the SNP and Greens was blocked as a result of the deal between Labour, the Liberal Democrats and Conservatives, which combined obtained 32 votes, compared to the 29 votes for the SNP-Green deal.

Several current and former elected Labour representatives were critical of the deal involving the Conservatives. Former Edinburgh North and Leith MP Mark Lazarowicz described the deal in the capital as "unacceptable", whilst Neil Findlay, who was a regional MSP for Lothian between 2011 and 2021, said: "I am appalled to see West Lothian Labour councillors voting Tories into office - the Tory party is the enemy of my class."

On 28 June 2022, the Labour group suspended Leith councillor Katrina Faccenda and Sighthill/Gorgie councillor Ross McKenzie for eight weeks after they opposed the deal with the Conservatives, temporarily reducing the administration to 11 members. Cllr McKenzie later resigned from the Labour group on 23 February 2023 in protest at the way the council's 2023–24 budget was passed.

In October 2024, Police Scotland began investigating Labour councillor Cammy Day, leader of the council, following an allegation of inappropriate behaviour. The allegations – which concerned Cllr Day contacting Ukrainian refugees with "sexually explicit messages" – became public in December 2024 and Cllr Day was suspended by Labour. Cllr Sumita Kumar, leader of the SNP group, said Cllr Day should "resign immediately" as council leader. Cllr Day subsequently resigned as council leader on 9 December. Further allegations surrounding Cllr Day as an unregistered landlord were made following his resignation.

An attempt by the SNP and the Greens to take over the running of the council following Cllr Day's resignation was defeated by 32 votes to 28. Despite holding just 10 seats, Labour retained minority control of the council following support from the Lib Dem and Conservative groups and Labour councillor Jane Meagher was elected as council leader.

=== Corstorphine/Murrayfield by-election ===
Frank Ross, SNP councillor for Corstorphine/Murrayfield, resigned on 16 December 2022 causing a by-election. The by-election was held on 9 March 2023 and was won by Fiona Bennett of the Liberal Democrats.

Corstorphine/Murrayfield by-election (9 March 2023) – 1 seat
Party	Candidate	FPv%	Count
Party	Candidate	FPv%	1
Liberal Democrats	Fiona Bennett	56.0	4,577
SNP	Donald Rutherford	13.3	1,086
Conservative	Hugh Findlay	9.6	788
Labour	Richard Parker	7.0	568
Green	Chris Young	5.1	417
Independent	Elaine Miller	3.7	327
Independent	Pete Gregson	3.6	295
Scottish Family	Richard Fettes	1.1	90
Scottish Libertarian	Gary Smith	0.2	20
Electorate: 19,435 Valid: 8,168 Spoilt: 57 Quota: 4,085 Turnout: 42.3%

=== 2024 Colinton/Fairmilehead by-election ===
In September 2024, Colinton/Fairmilehead councillor Scott Arthur resigned his council seat after successfully being elected as MP for Edinburgh South West at the 2024 United Kingdom general election. A by-election, held on 14 November 2024, was won by Lib Dem candidate Louise Spence. However, less than a week after the by-election, Cllr Spence resigned citing a "sudden change in personal circumstances". Following Cllr Spence's resignation, the Liberal Democrats were asked by the Conservative group of councillors to foot the bill for the by-election which was estimated to cost around £80,000.

Colinton/Fairmilehead by-election (14 November 2024) – 1 seat
Party	Candidate	FPv%	Count										
Party	Candidate	FPv%	1	2	3	4	5	6	7	8	9	10	11
Liberal Democrats	Louise Spence	36.3	2,683	2,684	2,685	2,687	2,697	2,704	2,763	2,793	2,898	3,096	3,751
Conservative	Neil Cuthbert	19.6	1,454	1,458	1,458	1,465	1,476	1,483	1,517	1,638	1,643	1,676	
Labour	Sheila Gilmore	19.5	1,441	1,441	1,444	1,446	1,453	1,463	1,480	1,495	1,611	1,886	2,055
SNP	Marianna Clyde	10.8	800	800	800	801	806	816	826	835	963		
Green	Daniel Milligan	5.3	393	393	396	397	402	407	414	423			
Reform	Grant Lidster	3.6	268	269	269	281	283	287	300				
Independent	Marc Wilkinson	2.3	173	173	175	177	179	190					
Independent	David Henry	0.8	57	57	57	63	75						
Scottish Family	Richard Lucas	0.7	51	51	51								
Independent	Mev Brown	0.7	50	51	60	62							
Independent	Bonnie Prince Bob	0.3	22	22									
Scottish Libertarian	Tam Laird	0.1	9										
Electorate: 19,907 Valid: 7,401 Spoilt: 45 Quota: 3,701 Turnout: 37.4%

=== 2025 Colinton/Fairmilehead by-election ===
In November 2024, within seven days of the 2024 Colinton/Fairmilehead by-election, Cllr Marco Biagi and Cllr Louise Spence – who spent less than a week in office – resigned. A by-election to fill both vacancies, held on 23 January 2025, was won by Conservative candidate Neil Cuthbert and Labour candidate Conor Savage.

Colinton/Fairmilehead by-election (23 January 2025) – 2 seats
Party	Candidate	FPv%	Count												
Party	Candidate	FPv%	1	2	3	4	5	6	7	8	9	10	11	12	13
Conservative	Neil Cuthbert	32.6	2,027	2,027	2,028	2,030	2,034	2,039	2,050	2,100					
Labour	Conor Savage	18.4	1,146	1,147	1,148	1,149	1,152	1,159	1,166	1,191	1,193	1,209	1,342	1,615	2,192
Liberal Democrats	Peter Nicholson	16.2	1,009	1,009	1,009	1,009	1,012	1,015	1,023	1,059	1,064	1,103	1,187	1,380	
SNP	Marianna Clyde	13.5	840	840	840	843	843	848	849	870	870	892	1,032		
Green	Daniel Milligan	6.8	426	426	426	426	432	436	444	460	460	467			
Reform	Grant Lidster	5.5	345	345	345	347	348	354	364	384	387				
Independent	Marc Wilkinson	4.1	256	256	258	260	264	278	288						
Scottish Family	Richard Lucas	1.0	65	65	68	69	70	70							
Independent	David Henry	0.6	38	38	43	54	61								
Independent	Bonnie Prince Bob	0.5	30	32	32	32									
Independent	Mev Brown	0.4	23	23	25										
Independent	Nick Horning	0.2	13	15											
Independent	Mark Ney-Party	0.1	5												
Electorate: 19,669 Valid: 6,223 Spoilt: 58 Quota: 2,075 Turnout: 31.9%

=== Fountainbridge/Craiglockhart by-election ===
Following the death of Fountainbridge/Craiglockhart councillor Val Walker in April 2025, a by-election was held to fill the vacancy on 26 June 2025 and was won by Liberal Democrat candidate Kevin McKay.

Fountainbridge/Craiglockhart by-election (26 June 2025) – 1 seat
Party	Candidate	FPv%	Count												
Party	Candidate	FPv%	1	2	3	4	5	6	7	8	9	10	11	12	13
Labour	Catriona Munro	20.8	1,293	1,293	1,295	1,297	1,304	1,307	1,314	1,335	1,368	1,502	1,668	2,219	
Liberal Democrats	Kevin McKay	20.4	1,269	1,270	1,270	1,276	1,279	1,285	1,288	1,321	1,364	1,480	1,867	2,316	3,409
Green	Q Manivannan	18.2	1,133	1,135	1,136	1,136	1,138	1,157	1,166	1,175	1,187	1,595	1,636		
SNP	Murray Visentin	14.5	905	905	905	907	909	913	919	930	950				
Conservative	Mark Hooley	13.8	857	858	861	862	865	865	868	884	1,080	1,109			
Reform	Gary Neill	7.9	489	489	490	491	498	499	500	512					
Independent	Marc Wilkinson	1.8	111	111	118	119	120	124	130						
Independent	Steve West	0.6	39	40	45	45	45								
Independent	Bonnie Prince Bob	0.6	36	38	42	43	46	48							
Scottish Family	Richard Lucas	0.5	34	34	34	39									
Scottish Libertarian	Lukasz Furmaniak	0.4	25	26	26										
Independent	Mark Rowbotham	0.4	25	25											
Independent	Derrick Emms	0.1	9												
Electorate: 18,945 Valid: 6,264 Spoilt: 39 Quota: 3,113 Turnout: 33.1%

=== September 2026 by-elections ===
At the 2026 Scottish Parliament election, Southside/Newington councillor Simita Kumar and Portobello/Craigmillar councillor Kate Campbell were elected as MSPs for Edinburgh South Western and Edinburgh Eastern, Musselburgh and Tranent respectively. Although councillors are only required to step down on election to the Scottish Parliament or the Parliament of the United Kingdom if there is not a subsequent election to the council within one year, meaning both Cllr Kumar and Cllr Campbell could have stayed in post until the 2027 City of Edinburgh Council election, they decided to resign as councillors on 4 June 2026. By-elections, held on 3 September 2026, were won by Labour candidate Ruth Elliott and Green candidate Lorenzo Martinico.

Southside/Newington by-election (3 September 2026) – 1 seat
Party	Candidate	FPv%	Count												
Party	Candidate	FPv%	1	2	3	4	5	6	7	8	9	10	11	12	13
Labour	Ruth Elliott	32.1	2,153	2,156	2,159	2,160	2,167	2,171	2,187	2,210	2,238	2,498	2,693	3,030	4,350
Green	Isabella Gastel Alejandre	29.5	1,978	1,978	1,978	1,979	1,982	2,007	2,020	2,037	2,043	2,119	2,486	2,505	
SNP	Sam MacKenzie	11.3	757	757	757	758	759	760	766	771	787	828			
Conservative	Nick Layden	10.7	717	717	717	719	727	728	733	743	872	948	968		
Liberal Democrats	Artie Khovanov	8.1	543	543	544	546	549	550	556	565	573				
Reform	Gary Neill	4.5	305	305	305	306	308	309	310	315					
Edinburgh and East Lothian People's Party	Marc Wilkinson	1.1	78	81	83	84	85	88	94						
Independent	Roisin Keirdashian	0.9	63	63	63	63	65	71							
Communist	Richard Shillcock	0.7	46	46	47	48	50								
Scottish Family	Richard Lucas	0.6	38	38	38	39									
ADF	Sean Moffat	0.2	12	12	13										
Edinburgh and East Lothian People's Party	Derrick Emms	0.1	9	9											
Edinburgh and East Lothian People's Party	Mark Rowbotham	0.1	7												
Electorate: 24,666 Valid: 6,706 Spoilt: 35 Quota: 3,354 Turnout: 27.3%

Portobello/Craigmillar by-election (3 September 2026) – 1 seat
Party	Candidate	FPv%	Count									
Party	Candidate	FPv%	1	2	3	4	5	6	7	8	9	10
Green	Lorenzo Martinico	28.0	1,781	1,786	1,788	1,810	1,825	1,872	1,890	1,920	2,652	3,341
SNP	Silas MacGilvray	24.1	1,531	1,533	1,537	1,555	1,567	1,609	1,631	1,681		
Labour	Jim Wyke	22.2	1,413	1,416	1,417	1,421	1,431	1,568	1,733	1,848	2,188	
Reform	Andrew McLaughlin	8.9	569	569	573	574	588	598	727			
Conservative	Haris Young	8.2	522	522	522	523	528	575				
Liberal Democrats	Liss Owen	5.7	365	365	366	372	372					
Scottish Family	Niel Deepnarain	1.1	73	74	77	80						
Workers Party	Pete Gregson	0.9	58	64	73							
ADF	David Ballantine	0.4	28	28								
Communist	Peter Olech	0.3	22									
Electorate: 28,062 Valid: 6,362 Spoilt: 65 Quota: 3,182 Turnout: 22.9%
