= Edinburgh South West =

UK Parliament constituency (since 2005)

Coordinates: 55°53′00″N 3°18′32″W

- Burgh constituency for the House of Commons
- Interactive map of boundaries from 2024
- Location within Scotland
- Subdivision: City of Edinburgh
- Electorate: 73,315 (March 2020)
- Major settlements: Wester Hailes, Bonaly, Balerno, Gorgie

Current constituency
- Created: 2005
- Member of Parliament: Scott Arthur (Labour)
- Created from: Edinburgh Pentlands and Edinburgh Central

Edinburgh South West is a Scottish constituency of the House of Commons of the Parliament of the United Kingdom, first used at the 2005 UK general election. It elects one Member of Parliament (MP) by the first past the post system of election. Since 2024, it has been represented by Scott Arthur of the Labour Party.

== Constituency profile ==
Edinburgh South West covers a south western portion of the city around the Lanark Road. It has an urban north east including Gorgie and Slateford, and a suburban centre including Wester Hailes. The southwest part is rural and extends into the Pentland Hills.

The seat is left-leaning and pro-EU, with wealthier residents than the UK average.

== Boundaries ==
Edinburgh South West is one of five constituencies covering the City of Edinburgh council area. All are entirely within the city council area.

Prior to the 2005 general election, the city area had been covered by six constituencies and, of the six, there was one, Edinburgh East and Musselburgh, which straddled the boundary with the East Lothian council area, to include Musselburgh.

Edinburgh South West is mostly a replacement for the former Edinburgh Pentlands constituency, but excludes some of the east of that constituency. Also, it includes a south western portion of the former Edinburgh Central constituency. The Scottish Parliament uses different boundaries. Edinburgh South West is mostly contained within the Edinburgh Pentlands constituency for elections to the Scottish Parliament, with some parts of the north and east of the seat being located in the constituencies of Edinburgh Central, Edinburgh Southern and Edinburgh Western.

2005–2024: Under the Fifth Review of UK Parliament constituencies which came into effect for the 2005 general election, the boundaries of the constituency were defined in accordance with the ward structure in place on 30 November 2004 and comprised the following wards of the City of Edinburgh Council: Balerno, Baberton, Colinton, Craiglockhart, Dalry, Firrhill, Fountainbridge, Moat, Murrayburn, Parkhead, Shandon and Sighthill. As a result of the Local Governance (Scotland) Act 2004, in 2007 these wards were replaced with new wards which were not aligned with the constituency boundaries. Further minor changes were made to ward boundaries in 2017.

2024–present: Under the 2023 review of Westminster constituencies, which came into effect for the 2024 general election, the constituency boundaries were virtually unchanged and comprise the following wards or part wards of the City of Edinburgh Council:

- The bulk of Pentland Hills ward - excluding Ratho and surrounding rural areas;
- a small part of Drum Brae/Gyle ward;
- the bulk of Sighthill/Gorgie ward - excluding the Saughton area;
- the majority of Colinton/Fairmilehead - excluding the Fairmilehead area;
- the whole of Fountainbridge/Craiglockhart ward;
- two small areas of Morningside ward; and
- the southwestern part of City Centre, including the West End and Tollcross areas.

== Members of Parliament ==
Election	Member	Party
2005	Alistair Darling	Labour
2015	Joanna Cherry	SNP
2024	Scott Arthur	Labour

== Election results ==
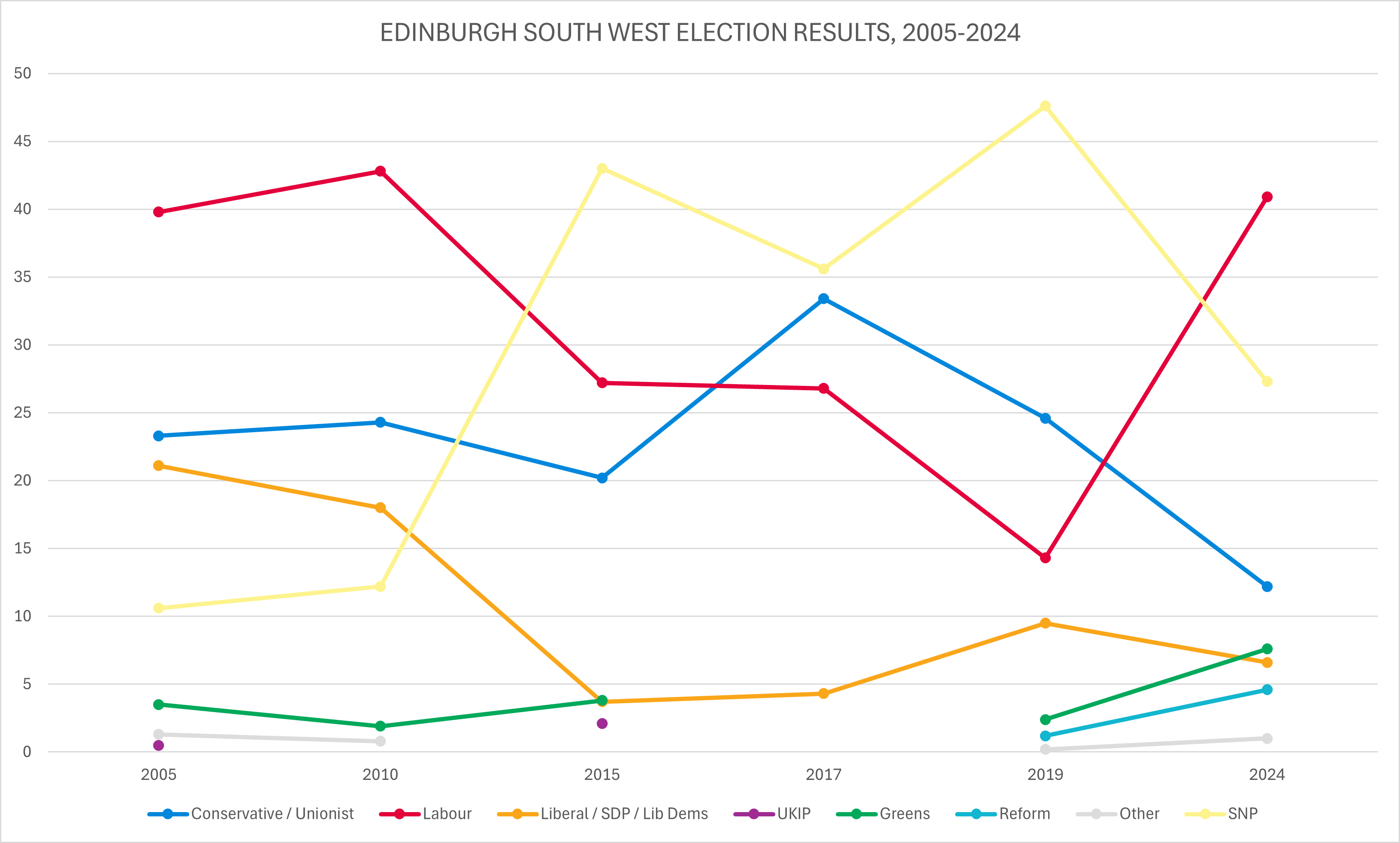
Election results 2005-2024

=== Elections in the 2020s ===
2024 general election: Edinburgh South West
Party	Candidate	Votes	%	±%
Labour	Scott Arthur	18,663	40.9	+26.5
SNP	Joanna Cherry	12,446	27.3	–20.4
Conservative	Sue Webber	5,558	12.2	–12.5
Green	Dan Heap	3,450	7.6	+5.1
Liberal Democrats	Bruce Wilson	3,014	6.6	–2.9
Reform	Ian Harper	2,087	4.6	+3.4
Scottish Family	Richard Lucas	265	0.6	N/A
Independent	Marc Wilkinson	181	0.4	N/A
Majority		6,217	13.6	N/A
Turnout		45,664	61.9	–9.0
Registered electors		73,784		+283
Labour gain from SNP		Swing	+23.5	

=== Elections in the 2010s ===
2019 general election: Edinburgh South West
Party	Candidate	Votes	%	±%
SNP	Joanna Cherry	24,830	47.6	+12.0
Conservative	Callum Laidlaw	12,848	24.6	–8.7
Labour	Sophie Cooke	7,478	14.3	–12.4
Liberal Democrats	Tom Inglis	4,971	9.5	+5.2
Green	Ben Parker	1,265	2.4	N/A
Brexit Party	David Ballantine	625	1.2	N/A
SDP	Mev Brown	114	0.2	N/A
Majority		11,982	23.0	+20.8
Turnout		52,131	70.9	+1.5
Registered electors		73,501		+2,323
SNP hold		Swing	+10.4	

2017 general election: Edinburgh South West
Party	Candidate	Votes	%	±%
SNP	Joanna Cherry	17,575	35.6	–7.4
Conservative	Miles Briggs	16,478	33.4	+13.1
Labour	Foysol Choudhury	13,213	26.8	–0.4
Liberal Democrats	Aisha Mir	2,124	4.3	+0.6
Majority		1,097	2.2	–13.6
Turnout		49,390	69.4	–2.1
Registered electors		71,178		–971
SNP hold		Swing	–10.2	

2015 general election: Edinburgh South West
Party	Candidate	Votes	%	±%
SNP	Joanna Cherry	22,168	43.0	+30.8
Labour	Ricky Henderson	14,033	27.2	−15.6
Conservative	Gordon Lindhurst	10,444	20.2	−4.1
Green	Richard Doherty	1,965	3.8	+1.9
Liberal Democrats	Daniel Farthing-Sykes	1,920	3.7	−14.3
UKIP	Richard Lucas	1,072	2.1	N/A
Majority		8,135	15.8	N/A
Turnout		51,602	71.5	+3.0
Registered electors		72,149		+5,788
SNP gain from Labour		Swing	+23.2	

2010 general election: Edinburgh South West
Party	Candidate	Votes	%	±%
Labour	Alistair Darling	19,473	42.8	+3.0
Conservative	Jason Rust	11,026	24.3	+1.0
Liberal Democrats	Tim McKay	8,194	18.0	–3.0
SNP	Kaukab Stewart	5,530	12.2	+1.6
Green	Clare Cooney	872	1.9	–1.5
Scottish Socialist	Colin Fox	319	0.7	–0.6
Communist League	Caroline Bellamy	48	0.1	N/a
Majority		8,447	18.5	+2.1
Turnout		45,462	68.6	+3.5
Registered electors		66,361		–1,223
Labour hold		Swing	+1.0	

=== Elections in the 2000s ===
2005 general election: Edinburgh South West
Party	Candidate	Votes	%	±%
Labour	Alistair Darling	17,476	39.8	–4.2
Conservative	Gordon Buchan	10,234	23.3	–2.9
Liberal Democrats	Simon Clark	9,252	21.1	+9.4
SNP	Nick Elliott-Cannon	4,654	10.6	–3.1
Green	John Blair-Fish	1,520	3.5	+0.9
Scottish Socialist	Pat Smith	585	1.3	–0.2
UKIP	William Boys	205	0.5	+0.2
Majority		7,242	16.5	–1.3
Turnout		43,926	65.0	+7.9
Registered electors		67,584		–8,203
Labour hold		Swing	–0.6	

2001 notional result
Party	Vote	%
Labour	19,038	44.0
Conservative	11,352	26.2
SNP	5,910	13.7
Liberal Democrats	5,052	11.7
Green	1,122	2.6
Others	814	1.9
Turnout	43,288	57.1
Electorate	75,787	

== See also ==
- Politics of Edinburgh

Parliament of the United Kingdom
Preceded by Kirkcaldy and Cowdenbeath	Constituency represented by the chancellor of the Exchequer; 2007–2010	Succeeded by Tatton
