= Riccarton =

Riccarton may refer to:

== New Zealand ==
- Riccarton, New Zealand, a suburb of Christchurch
  - Riccarton (New Zealand electorate), the electorate named after it
  - The location of Riccarton Race Course
- a locality on the Taieri Plains in Otago

== Scotland ==
- Riccarton, East Ayrshire, a parish and old village in Ayrshire, today considered part of Kilmarnock
- Riccarton, Edinburgh, a locality to the south-west of Edinburgh, the site of Heriot-Watt University's main campus
- Riccarton Tower, at the beginning of Riccarton Burn, the valley of Clan Crozier, Liddesdale
- Riccarton Junction railway station, a former station
