= List of acts of the Parliament of the United Kingdom from 2026 =

This is a list of acts of the Parliament of the United Kingdom passed in 2026.

Acts passed since 1963 are cited by calendar year, as opposed to the convention used for earlier acts of citing the regnal year(s) in which the relevant parliamentary session was held. Each act passed in a respective year is given a chapter number (abbreviated "c."), denoted by Arabic numerals in the case of public general acts, lowercase Roman numerals in the case of local acts, or italicised Arabic numerals in the case of personal acts. These run as separate series.

28 acts of Parliament have so far been passed in 2026: 27 public general acts and 1 local act.

indicates that an act has been transcribed on Wikisource, indicates that an act is available to view at legislation.gov.uk, and indicates the location of the original act in the Parliamentary Archives.

== Public general acts ==
Short title	Citation	Royal assent
Long title
Unauthorised Entry to Football Matches Act 2026	2026 c. 1	22 January 2026
An Act to create an offence of unauthorised entry at football matches for which a football banning order can be imposed following conviction.
Sentencing Act 2026	2026 c. 2	22 January 2026
An Act to make provision about the sentencing, release and management after sentencing of offenders; to make provision about bail; to make provision about the removal from the United Kingdom of foreign criminals; and for connected purposes.
Holocaust Memorial Act 2026	2026 c. 3	22 January 2026
An Act to make provision for expenditure by the Secretary of State and the removal of restrictions in respect of certain land for or in connection with the construction of a Holocaust Memorial and Learning Centre.
Licensing Hours Extensions Act 2026	2026 c. 4	12 February 2026
An Act to amend the Licensing Act 2003 (Note: Licensing Act 2003 (c. 17)) so that licensing hours orders can be made by negative resolution statutory instrument.
Secure 16 to 19 Academies Act 2026	2026 c. 5	12 February 2026
An Act to make provision about the notice period for termination of funding agreements for secure 16 to 19 Academies; to make provision about the Secretary of State’s duty to consider the impact on existing educational institutions when it is proposed to establish or expand a secure 16 to 19 Academy; and to alter the consultation question required when it is proposed to establish or expand a secure 16 to 19 Academy.
Biodiversity Beyond National Jurisdiction Act 2026	2026 c. 6	12 February 2026
An Act to make provision for and in connection with the implementation by the United Kingdom of the Agreement under the United Nations Convention on the Law of the Sea on the Conservation and Sustainable Use of Marine Biological Diversity of Areas Beyond National Jurisdiction.
Medical Training (Prioritisation) Act 2026	2026 c. 7	5 March 2026
An Act to make provision about the prioritisation of graduates from medical schools in the United Kingdom and certain other persons for places on medical training programmes.
Rare Cancers Act 2026	2026 c. 8	5 March 2026
An Act to make provision to incentivise research and investment into the treatment of rare types of cancer; and for connected purposes.
Sustainable Aviation Fuel Act 2026	2026 c. 9	5 March 2026
An Act to make provision about sustainable aviation fuel.
Supply and Appropriation (Anticipation and Adjustments) Act 2026	2026 c. 10	18 March 2026
An Act to authorise the use of resources for the years ending with 31 March 2025, 31 March 2026 and 31 March 2027; to authorise the issue of sums out of the Consolidated Fund for those years; and to appropriate the supply authorised by this Act for the years ending with 31 March 2025 and 31 March 2026.
Finance Act 2026	2026 c. 11	18 March 2026
An Act to make provision in connection with finance.
House of Lords (Hereditary Peers) Act 2026	2026 c. 12	18 March 2026
An Act to remove the remaining connection between hereditary peerage and membership of the House of Lords; to make provision about resignation from the House of Lords; to abolish the jurisdiction of the House of Lords in relation to claims to hereditary peerages; and for connected purposes.
Universal Credit (Removal of Two Child Limit) Act 2026	2026 c. 13	18 March 2026
An Act to make provision to remove the two child limit on the child element of universal credit.
Industry and Exports (Financial Assistance) Act 2026	2026 c. 14	18 March 2026
An Act to amend section 8(5) of the Industrial Development Act 1982 (Note: Industrial Development Act 1982 (c. 52)) and section 6 of the Export and Investment Guarantees Act 1991. (Note: Export and Investment Guarantees Act 1991 (c. 67))
National Insurance Contributions (Employer Pensions Contributions) Act 2026	2026 c. 15	29 April 2026
An Act to Make provision to amend section 4 of the Social Security Contributions and Benefits Act 1992, (Note: Social Security Contributions and Benefits Act 1992 (c. 4)) and section 4 of the Social Security Contributions and Benefits (Northern Ireland) Act 1992, (Note: Social Security Contributions and Benefits (Northern Ireland) Act 1992 (c. 7)) so that amounts of salary sacrificed for employer pensions contributions pursuant to optional remuneration arrangements are liable to national insurance contributions.
Grenfell Tower Memorial (Expenditure) Act 2026	2026 c. 16	29 April 2026
An Act to Authorise the payment out of money provided by Parliament of expenditure incurred by the Secretary of State in connection with the commemoration of the victims of the fire at Grenfell Tower; and for connected purposes.
Ministerial Salaries (Amendment) Act 2026	2026 c. 17	29 April 2026
An Act to Make provision about the maximum number of salaries that may be paid under the Ministerial and other Salaries Act 1975 (Note: Ministerial and other Salaries Act 1975 (c. 27)) in respect of certain Ministerial offices.
Tobacco and Vapes Act 2026	2026 c. 18	29 April 2026
An Act to make provision about the supply of tobacco, vapes and other products, including provision prohibiting the sale of tobacco to people born on or after 1 January 2009 and provision about the licensing of retail sales and the registration of retailers; to enable product and information requirements to be imposed in connection with tobacco, vapes and other products; to control the advertising and promotion of tobacco, vapes and other products; and to make provision about smoke-free places, vape-free places and heated tobacco-free places.
Victims and Courts Act 2026	2026 c. 19	29 April 2026
An Act to Make provision about the experience of victims within the criminal justice system; about the functions of the Commissioner for Victims and Witnesses; and about procedure and the administration of criminal justice.
Crime and Policing Act 2026	2026 c. 20	29 April 2026
An Act to make provision about anti-social behaviour, offensive weapons, offences against people (including sexual offences), property offences, the criminal exploitation of persons, sex offenders, stalking and public order; to make provision about powers of the police, the border force and other similar persons; to make provision about confiscation; to make provision about the police; to make provision about terrorism and national security, and about international agreements relating to crime; to make provision about the criminal liability of bodies; and for connected purposes.
Children's Wellbeing and Schools Act 2026	2026 c. 21	29 April 2026
An Act to make provision about the safeguarding and welfare of children; about support for children in care or leaving care; about regulation of care workers; about regulation of establishments and agencies under Part 2 of the Care Standards Act 2000; (Note: Care Standards Act 2000 (c. 14)) about employment of children; about breakfast club provision and school uniform; about allergy safety in schools; about attendance of children at school; about regulation of independent educational institutions; about inspections of schools and colleges; about teacher misconduct; about Academies and teachers at Academies; repealing section 128 of the Education Act 2002; (Note: Education Act 2002 (c. 32)) about school places and admissions; about establishing new schools; and for connected purposes.
Pension Schemes Act 2026	2026 c. 22	29 April 2026
An Act to make provision about pension schemes; and for connected purposes.
English Devolution and Community Empowerment Act 2026	2026 c. 23	29 April 2026
An Act to make provision about combined authorities, combined county authorities, the Greater London Authority, local councils, police and crime commissioners and fire and rescue authorities, local audit and terms in business tenancies about rent.
National Security (State Threats) Act 2026	2026 c. 24	8 July 2026
An Act to make provision for the designation of bodies involved in foreign power threat activity; to create offences relating to bodies designated under this Act; and for connected purposes.
Supply and Appropriation (Main Estimates) Act 2026	2026 c. 25	15 July 2026
An Act to authorise the use of resources for the year ending with 31 March 2027; to authorise both the issue of sums out of the Consolidated Fund and the application of income for that year; and to appropriate the supply authorised for that year by this Act and by the Supply and Appropriation (Anticipation and Adjustments) Act 2026.
Taxation (Energy and Vehicles) Act 2026	2026 c. 26	15 July 2026
An Act to increase the rate of electricity generator levy and mileage amounts relating to income tax and to provide for temporary rates of vehicle excise duty for goods vehicles.
Steel Industry (Nationalisation) Act 2026	2026 c. 27	15 July 2026
An Act to make provision enabling the Secretary of State in certain circumstances to make regulations relating to the transfer of securities issued by, or property, rights and liabilities of, a steel undertaking; and for connected purposes.

== Local acts ==
Short title	Citation	Royal assent
Long title
Cheltenham Borough Council (Markets) Act 2026	2026 c. i	15 July 2026
An Act to make provision for the repeal of section 83 of the Cheltenham Improvement Act 1852; and for connected purposes

== See also ==
- List of acts of the Parliament of the United Kingdom
