= Almond (ward) =

Electoral ward in Edinburgh, Scotland

Location of the ward within Edinburgh

Almond is one of the 17 wards of the City of Edinburgh Council. Established in 2007 along with the other wards, it currently elects four councillors.

The River Almond flows through much of its territory, which covers the north-western edge of the city – Barnton, Cammo, Cramond, Davidson's Mains, Muirhouse (a 2017 boundary change addition which increased the population and consequently the number of councillors) and Silverknowes – and outlying communities at Dalmeny, Kirkliston, Newbridge and South Queensferry, adjoining West Lothian and the natural boundary of the Firth of Forth. In 2019, the ward had a population of 36,730.

== Councillors ==
Election	Councillors			
2007	Norman Work (SNP)	Kate Mackenzie (Conservative)	George Grubb (Liberal Democrats)	3 seats
2012	Norman Work (SNP)	Lindsay Paterson (Conservative)	Alastair Shields (Liberal Democrats)	3 seats
2017	Norman Work (SNP)	Graham Hutchison (Conservative)	Kevin Lang (Liberal Democrats)	Louise Young (Liberal Democrats)
2022	Norman Work (SNP)	Lewis James Younie (Liberal Democrats)	Kevin Lang (Liberal Democrats)	Louise Young (Liberal Democrats)

== Election results ==
=== 2022 election ===
Almond - 4 seats
Party	Candidate	FPv%	Count							
Party	Candidate	FPv%	1	2	3	4	5	6	7	8
Liberal Democrats	Kevin Lang (incumbent)	42.4	5,904							
SNP	Norrie Work (incumbent)	20.9	2,911							
Liberal Democrats	Louise Young (incumbent)	16.0	2,221	4,937						
Conservative	James Hill	7.5	1,040	1,162	1,242	1,244	1,245	1,290	1,355	1,416
Scottish Green	Andrew Brough	5.3	736	799	852	918	938	958	1,187	
Labour	Fred Hessler	4.9	688	742	786	803	816	837		
Liberal Democrats	Lewis James Younie	1.4	200	313	2,207	2,218	2,223	2,251	2,435	2,870
Scottish Family	Stewart Geddes	1.1	148	153	160	162	174			
Workers Party	Annemarie Baillie	0.4	61	65	67	69				
Electorate: 27,454 Valid: 13,909 Spoilt: 115 Quota: 2,782 Turnout: 51.1%

=== 2017 election ===
2017 City of Edinburgh Council election

Almond - 4 seats
Party	Candidate	FPv%	Count									
Party	Candidate	FPv%	1	2	3	4	5	6	7	8	9	10
Liberal Democrats	Kevin Lang	42.8%	6,079									
Liberal Democrats	Louise Young	8.0%	1,138	3,652								
Conservative	Graham Hutchison	16.9%	2,395	2,727	2,995							
SNP	Norrie Work (incumbent)	13.9%	1,971	2,055	2,105	2,108	2,111	2,117	2,123	2,225	2,387	3,744
SNP	Pamela Mitchell	8.7%	1,240	1,286	1,306	1,309	1,321	1,326	1,342	1,485	1,691	
Labour	Bruce Whitehead	5.5%	786	869	966	985	996	1,014	1,037	1,167		
Scottish Green	Iain McKinnon-Waddell	2.6%	375	430	495	502	510	537	558			
Scottish Libertarian	Daniel Fraser	0.7%	99	113	119	123	134	139				
Independent	John Longstaff	0.4%	56	69	89	102	120					
UKIP	Otto Inglis	0.5%	68	79	85	100						
Electorate: 25,455 Valid: 14,207 Spoilt: 129 Quota: 2,842 Turnout: 56.3%

=== 2012 election ===
2012 City of Edinburgh Council election

2012 Council election: Almond - 3 seats
Party	Candidate	FPv%	Count						
Party	Candidate	FPv%	1	2	3	4	5	6	7
SNP	Norman Work (incumbent)	32.55%	2,722						
Conservative	Lindsay Paterson	26.24%	2,194						
Liberal Democrats	Alastair Shields	15.89%	1,329	1,460	1,500	1,515	1,579	1,804	2,426
Labour	Billy Fitzpatrick	14.92%	1,248	1,350	1,356	1,373	1,421	1,623	
Scottish Green	Moira Dunworth	6.17%	516	651	657	683	768		
Independent	John Longstaff	2.49%	208	268	276	338			
UKIP	Otto Inglis	1.73%	145	168	181				
Electorate: 18,996 Valid: 8,362 Spoilt: 51 Quota: 2,091 Turnout: 8,413 (44.3%)

Liberal Democrat Councillor Alastair Shields resigned from the party and became an Independent after having been de-selected, with the intention to contest the 2017 local elections as an Independent (ultimately he retired).

=== 2007 election ===
2007 City of Edinburgh Council election

2007 Council election: Almond
Party	Candidate	FPv%	Count						
Party	Candidate	FPv%	1	2	3	4	5	6	7
Conservative	Kate Mackenzie	28.1	3,352						
Liberal Democrats	George Grubb	23.6	2,809	2,864.78	2,884.14	3,076.36			
SNP	Norman Work	18.2	2,164	2,193.84	2,219.08	2,325.21	2,341.37	2,568.21	3,300.77
Liberal Democrats	Neil MacLean	13.0	1,548	1,654.82	1,664.94	1,761.03	1,823.11	2,351.21	
Labour	John Longstaff	10.7	1,280	1,298.24	1,317.36	1,382.61	1,399.23		
Scottish Green	Jill Boulton	4.4	520	548.42	586.54				
Scottish Socialist	Ross Clark	1.2	144	145.42					
Electorate: 18,779 Valid: 11,817 Spoilt: 104 Quota: 2,955 Turnout: 62.93%
