= Rare Cancers Act 2026 =

Act of the Parliament of the United Kingdom

Rare Cancers Act 2026 (Note: Section 6.)
- Act of Parliament
- Parliament of the United Kingdom
- Long title: An Act to make provision to incentivise research and investment into the treatment of rare types of cancer; and for connected purposes.
- Citation: 2026 c. 8
- Introduced by: Scott Arthur (Commons); Julie, Baroness Elliott of Whitburn Bay (Lords)
- Territorial extent: England and Wales; Scotland and Northern Ireland (Except sections 2 and 3); (Note: Section 4.)

Dates
- Royal assent: 5 March 2026
- Commencement: 5 May 2026 (Note: Section 5.)
Other legislation
Amends	National Health Service Act 2006; Health and Social Care Act 2012

Status: Current legislation

Text of statute as originally enacted

Revised text of statute as amended

Rare Cancers Act 2026 is a piece of legislation in the United Kingdom intended to incentivise research, improve diagnosis, and increase investment into treatments for rare types of cancer. Introduced as a Private Member's Bill by Dr Scott Arthur MP, it defines a "rare cancer" as any condition affecting fewer than 1 in 2,000 people.

The Act is a component of the government's National Cancer Plan, aiming to address the research gap where rare cancers account for nearly half of all cancer diagnoses but receive disproportionately less funding than common types like breast or lung cancer.

== Background ==
Rare cancers are defined by the UK Rare Diseases Framework as those affecting fewer than 6 in 100,000 people per year. Collectively, these cancers account for approximately 47% of all cancer diagnoses in the United Kingdom, yet they receive a disproportionately lower share of research funding compared to common cancers such as breast cancer or lung cancer.

The Act was introduced as a Private Member's Bill following the Private Member's Bill ballot in late 2024, where Dr Scott Arthur secured a high ranking. Dr Arthur cited the "research gap" and the difficulties rare cancer patients face in accessing clinical trials as the primary drivers for the legislation.

== Provisions ==
The Act consists of three substantive clauses designed to address key issues in rare cancer research and treatment.

Review of law on marketing authorisations (Clause 1)

This clause places a statutory duty on the Secretary of State to conduct a comprehensive review of the UK's regulatory framework for orphan medicinal products (drugs for rare conditions) specifically as they relate to cancer.

The review must consider international regulatory approaches to identify how the UK can remain competitive in attracting global investment.

A report detailing the findings and conclusions must be published and laid before Parliament within three years of the Act's commencement.

Secretary of State's duties as to research (Clause 2)

The Act amends Section 1E of the National Health Service Act 2006 to explicitly include "rare cancers" (defined as those affecting fewer than 1 in 2,000 people in the UK) within the Secretary of State's existing duty to promote and facilitate medical research. Under this clause, the Secretary of State must:

Appoint a National Specialty Lead for Rare Cancers: This statutory role is tasked with providing advice on research design and planning, as well as facilitating collaboration between industry, academia, and the NHS.

Establish recruitment arrangements: The Secretary of State must ensure arrangements are in place to identify and contact potential participants for clinical trials. While the Bill does not mandate a specific platform, the government's explanatory notes suggest this would likely be delivered via the NIHR's "Be Part of Research" service.

Disclosure of information for research purposes (Clause 3)

This clause amends Section 261 of the Health and Social Care Act 2012 to expand the powers of NHS England regarding data sharing.

It grants the power to disclose information obtained through NHS information systems specifically for the purpose of facilitating clinical trials into rare cancers.

This is intended to allow researchers to identify potential participants more efficiently while maintaining compliance with existing data protection legislation.

== Legislative history ==
=== House of Commons ===
The bill had its first reading on 16 October 2024. During its second reading on 14 March 2025, it received cross-party support. The Parliamentary Under-Secretary of State for Health and Social Care stated that the government would not oppose the bill, noting that it aligned with the government's 10-Year Cancer Plan.

The bill passed its third reading in the Commons on 11 July 2025 without a division.

=== House of Lords ===
The bill was introduced to the House of Lords by Baroness Elliott of Whitburn Bay on 14 July 2025. It achieved Royal Assent on the 5th of March, 2026.
