= Riccarton, Edinburgh =

Area of Edinburgh, Scotland

Coordinates: 55.908333°N 3.322222°W

Riccarton
- Location within the City of Edinburgh council area Location within Scotland
- Council area: City of Edinburgh
- Country: Scotland
- Sovereign state: United Kingdom
- Police: Scotland
- Fire: Scottish
- Ambulance: Scottish
- UK Parliament: Edinburgh South West
- Scottish Parliament: Edinburgh Pentlands

Riccarton is an area in Edinburgh's Green Belt, in Scotland. It is mainly undeveloped, with much farmland and few houses.

Riccarton is to the west of the Edinburgh City Bypass (the A720), and is known for being the location of Heriot-Watt University's main campus, including Oriam, Scotland's National Performance Centre for Sport which opened to the public in August 2016.

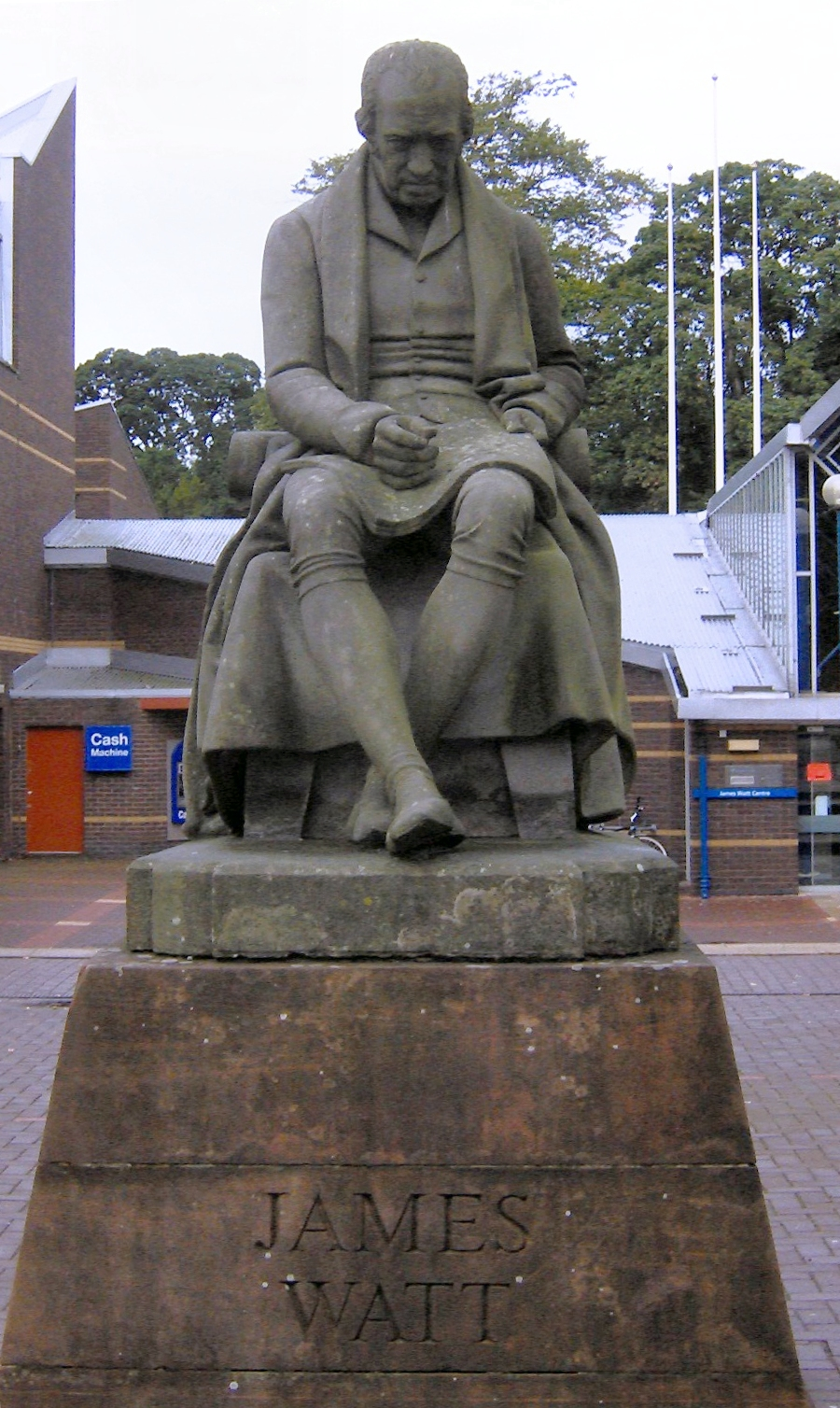
This statue of James Watt commissioned for the School of Arts today sits at Heriot-Watt's Riccarton Campus.

In recent years, there have been numerous controversies surrounding potential development in the area.

The area is bordered by Currie, Juniper Green and Curriehill to the south, The Calders (Wester Hailes) to the east, and Hermiston to the north.
