= Kate Campbell (politician) =

Scottish politician

Kate Campbell MSP
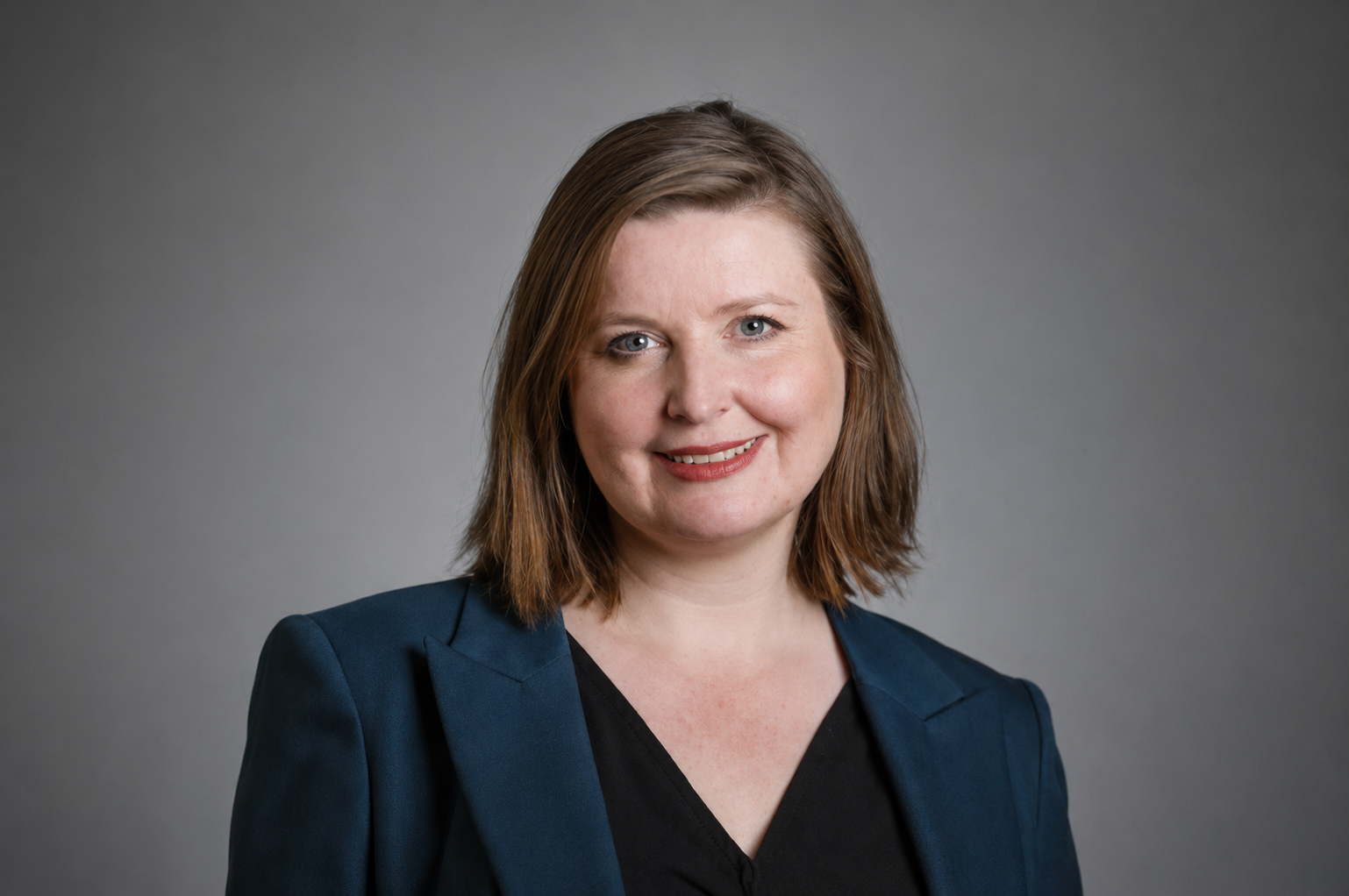
- Official portrait, 2026

Member of Scottish Parliament for Edinburgh Eastern, Musselburgh and Tranent
- Incumbent
- Assumed office 7 May 2026
- Preceded by: Constituency established
- Majority: 4,986 (15.8%)

Member of City of Edinburgh Council for Portobello/Craigmillar
- Incumbent
- Assumed office 4 May 2017

Personal details
- Party: Scottish National Party
- Website: www.katecampbell.scot

Kate Campbell is a Scottish politician who has served as a Member of Scottish Parliament for Edinburgh Eastern, Musselburgh and Tranent since May 2026. She is a member of the Scottish National Party.

== Biography ==
Campbell is a member of City of Edinburgh Council. She represents the Portobello/Craigmillar ward, elected in 2017 and 2022.

Campbell was selected as the Scottish National Party candidate for the Edinburgh Eastern, Musselburgh and Tranent constituency in the 2026 Scottish Parliament election. She was selected to succeed Ash Regan. Campbell was elected MSP.
