= Sue Webber =

Scottish Conservative politician

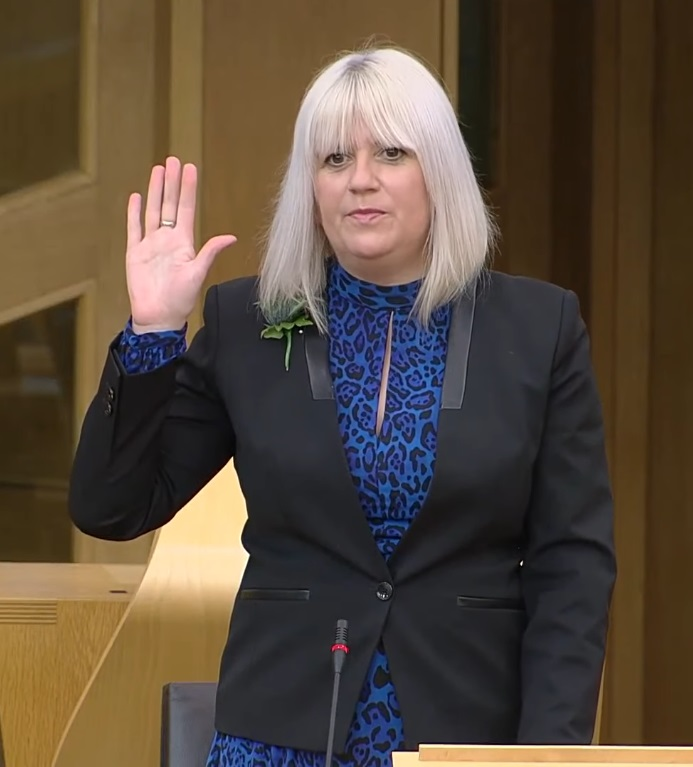
- Swearing in, 2021

Member of the Scottish Parliament for Lothian (1 of 7 Regional MSPs)
- In office 6 May 2021 – 9 April 2026

Councillor, City of Edinburgh Council
- In office 5 May 2017 – 5 May 2022
- Constituency: Pentland Hills

Personal details
- Born: Edinburgh, Scotland
- Party: Scottish Conservatives

Sue Webber is a Scottish Conservative politician who served as a Member of the Scottish Parliament (MSP) for the Lothian region from May 2021 until 2026.

== Early life and education ==
Webber was born and raised in Edinburgh. She attended Currie High School and the University of Edinburgh.

== Political career ==
Webber was elected as Councillor for the Pentland Hills ward on City of Edinburgh Council in the 2017 council election. She was the Conservatives' transport spokeswoman in the Council.

=== Member of the Scottish Parliament ===
On 20 November 2020, Webber was chosen as the Conservative candidate for Edinburgh Western at the upcoming Scottish Parliament election. She faced calls for her deselection in March 2021 after WhatsApp messages that were highly critical of COVID-19 restrictions were leaked. In the election, Webber received 2,798 votes (6%), placing her a distant third. She was appointed as a regional member on the Lothian list, which saw the party retain their three seats from 2016.

She is the Scottish Conservative Shadow Secretary for drugs policy.

Webber stood as the Conservative candidate for Edinburgh South West at the 2024 general election. She finished third, behind the SNP's Joanna Cherry and the successful Labour candidate, Scott Arthur. Webber took 5,558 votes (12.2%), a 12.4% decrease in the party's vote share compared to 2019.

Webber was the Conservative candidate for Edinburgh South Western at the 2026 Scottish Parliament election. She was not re-elected as the second candidate on the Edinburgh and Lothians East list.
