= The Calders =

Suburb of Edinburgh, Scotland

Coordinates: 55°55′10″N 3°17′45″W

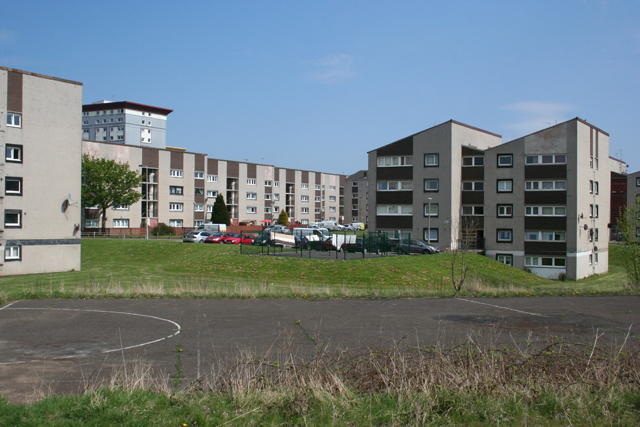
Apartments in variations of the neighbourhood's common design style, with Calder Crescent / Calder Grove in the foreground, seen from the Union Canal towpath

The Calders is a residential neighbourhood in Edinburgh, Scotland – not to be confused with the Calders of West Lothian aka West Calder, Mid Calder and East Calder, three separate villages. It is sometimes considered to be part of Wester Hailes, a larger development to its south. From 2007 to 2017, it fell within the Sighthill/Gorgie multi-member ward of the City of Edinburgh Council administration along with Sighthill, but following a boundary change has been in the Pentland Hills ward since then, along with Wester Hailes.

To the west of the neighbourhood is the A720 Edinburgh city bypass road, with Heriot-Watt University's main campus at Riccarton beyond. To the north, the Calders borders the A71 Calder Road, which at that point is a dual carriageway leading off the city bypass towards Gorgie and the city centre; on the other side of the A71 is the large Bankhead industrial estate. The Union Canal passes through the area, marking its western and southern boundaries. Pedestrian underpasses connect the Calders to Bankhead under the A71, and to Sighthill under the B701 Wester Hailes Road, also a dual carriageway. The presence of the three main roads and canal surrounding the area on all sides gives it a somewhat isolated character, and a roughly square footprint.

Wester Hailes High School is located within the Calders. The bulk of the housing stock is council owned, and the area contains some of the remaining high rises in Edinburgh (Cobbinshaw House, Dunsyre House and Medwin House, all 13-storey 'slab' blocks). The majority of the other buildings are four storeys high (some in a tenement style with a common stairway serving two flats on each floor, others in cube-shaped structures with four flats on each floor off a central stairway, with a small percentage of two-storey tenements and some of the cube blocks built on a slope towards the canal featuring a fifth, 'basement' storey). All were built in the late 1960s and early 1970s to an angular design, primarily of grey concrete with dark brown features; prior to their construction, the area contained pre-war prefabs. The area was popular with many tenants when first built; in the 21st century there are significant levels of deprivation in the community. But the community still stands strong. Recent events have included 2 people getting stabbed in March 2026.
