= Victims and Courts Act 2026 =

Act of the Parliament of the United Kingdom

Victims and Courts Act 2026 (Note: Section 19.)
- Act of Parliament
- Parliament of the United Kingdom
- Long title: An Act to make provision about the experience of victims within the criminal justice system; about the functions of the Commissioner for Victims and Witnesses; and about procedure and the administration of criminal justice.
- Citation: 2026 c. 19
- Territorial extent: England and Wales; Scotland; Northern Ireland; (Note: Section 17.)

Dates
- Royal assent: 29 April 2026
- Commencement: 29 April 2026 (sections 16–19); 29 June 2026 (sections 11–15); 13 August 2026 (in part) (Note: The Victims and Courts Act 2026 (Commencement No. 1) Regulations 2026 (SI 2026/918).); rest of act not yet in force; (Note: Section 18.)
Other legislation
Amends	Prosecution of Offences Act 1985; Criminal Justice Act 1988; Children Act 1989; Domestic Violence, Crime and Victims Act 2004; Armed Forces Act 2006; Sentencing Code; Victims and Prisoners Act 2024

Status: Current legislation

Text of statute as originally enacted

Revised text of statute as amended

The Victims and Courts Act 2026 is an act of the Parliament of the United Kingdom.
