= 2017 City of Edinburgh Council election =

2017 local election in Scotland

- 4 May 2017

All 63 seats to City of Edinburgh Council 32 seats needed for a majority
- Turnout: 50.5% (▲7.9%)
	First party	Second party	Third party
Leader	Adam McVey	Cameron Rose	Cammy Day
Party	SNP	Conservative	Labour
Leader's seat	Leith	Southside /Newington	Forth
Last election	18 seats, 26.87%	11 seats, 19.75%	20 seats, 28.13%
Seats before	17	11	21
Seats after	19	18	12
Seat change	▲1	▲7	▼8
Popular vote	49,994	51,212	33,916
Percentage	27.1%	27.7%	18.4%
Swing	▲0.2%	▲8.8%	▼9.8%
	Fourth party	Fifth party
Leader	Steve Burgess
Party	Green	Liberal Democrats
Leader's seat	Southside /Newington	Corstorphine /Murrayfield
Last election	6 seats, 11.44%	3 seats, 9.34%
Seats before	5	2
Seats after	8	6
Seat change	▲2	▲3
Popular vote	22,907	25,154
Percentage	12.4%	13.6%
Swing	▲1.0%	▲4.3%
- Election result by council wards

Leader of the Council before election
Andrew Burns
Labour
Leader of the Council after election
Adam McVey
SNP

Elections for the City of Edinburgh Council were held on Thursday 4 May 2017, on the same day as the 31 other local authorities in Scotland. It was the third successive Local Council election to run under the single transferable vote (STV) electoral system.

The election saw the SNP become the largest party on the council for the first time, whilst the Conservative party overcame Labour to become the second largest party. Following the election Leith councillor Adam McVey took over control of the SNP group from Frank Ross. Conservative group leader Cameron Rose was similarly replaced by Iain Whyte. The Labour group elected Cammy Day as their leader.

The Labour-SNP administration formed in 2012 lost their majority however were able to continue in office in a minority administration, with Labour now being the junior partner to the SNP.

== Boundary changes ==
Following the implementation of changes recommended by the Local Government Boundary Commission for Scotland the number of councillors to be elected was increased from 58 to 63. This was also the first election contested on new boundaries since the 2007 election. While the number of wards remained at 17, five wards:

1. Almond
2. Pentland Hills
3. City Centre
4. Craigentinny/Duddingston
5. Portobello/Craigmillar

elected four councillors instead of three.

The fourth placed and losing candidate in four wards was SNP and one ward a Lib Dem. In a re-run of the 2017 election the boundary changes would have likely lead to an increase of +4 SNP Councillors and +1 Liberal Democrat.

The Meadows/Morningside ward was also renamed as Morningside.

== Election result ==
2017 City of Edinburgh Council election Electorate: 370,692 Turnout: 187,157 (50.5%) Total Valid: 184,627
Party	Seats	Gains	Losses	Net gain/loss	Seats %	Votes %	Votes	+/−
SNP	19	3	2	▲1	30.16	27.08	49,994	▲0.21
Conservative	18	7	0	▲7	28.57	27.73	51,212	▲8.82
Labour	12	1	9	▼8	19.05	18.37	33,916	▼9.76
Green	8	3	1	▲2	12.70	12.41	22,907	▲0.97
Liberal Democrats	6	3	0	▲3	9.52	13.62	25,154	▲4.28
Independent	0	0	0	0	0.00	0.67	1,239	▼1.17
Scottish Libertarian	0	0	0	0	0.00	0.11	201	New
UKIP	0	0	0	0	0.00	0.07	134	▼0.27
Socialist Labour	0	0	0	0	0.00	0.04	66	New

== Ward summary ==
Results of the 2017 City of Edinburgh Council election by ward
Ward	%	Seats	%	Seats	%	Seats	%	Seats	%	Seats	%	Seats	Total
Ward	Labour		SNP		Conservative		Green		Lib Dem		Others		Total
Almond	5.53	0	22.60	1	16.86	1	2.64	0	50.80	2	1.57	0	4
Pentland Hills	20.63	1	28.83	1	41.27	2	4.32	0	4.95	0	0.00	0	4
Drum Brae/Gyle	13.32	0	26.82	1	22.00	1	4.34	0	33.52	1	0.0	0	3
Forth	20.73	1	31.31	2	28.38	1	9.99	0	7.81	0	1.78	0	4
Inverleith	12.37	0	18.96	1	36.91	2	12.30	0	16.59	1	2.87	0	4
Corstorphine/Murrayfield	7.68	0	21.65	1	33.41	1	5.23	0	30.64	1	1.38	0	3
Sighthill/Gorgie	21.64	1	40.17	2	19.09	1	14.88	0	3.91	0	0.32	0	4
Colinton/Fairmilehead	20.59	1	20.73	0	49.76	2	4.28	0	4.64	0	0.00	0	3
Fountainbridge/Craiglockhart	13.84	0	21.04	1	31.80	1	27.61	1	5.04	0	0.68	0	3
Morningside	18.21	1	17.87	0	29.54	1	19.36	1	15.02	1	0.00	0	4
City Centre	13.25	1	25.07	1	32.68	1	20.52	1	8.00	0	0.48	0	4
Leith Walk	22.49	1	34.46	2	14.42	0	19.69	1	3.74	0	5.19	0	4
Leith	20.35	1	36.16	1	15.93	0	22.26	1	5.29	0	0.00	0	3
Craigentinny/Duddingston	23.25	1	37.11	1	23.72	1	11.70	1	4.21	0	0.00	0	4
Southside/Newington	20.12	1	20.54	1	26.93	1	20.35	1	12.05	0	0.00	0	4
Liberton/Gilmerton	32.27	1	33.80	2	23.24	1	5.17	0	5.52	0	0.00	0	4
Portobello/Craigmillar	30.39	1	32.56	1	19.48	1	15.10	1	2.47	0	0.00	0	4
Total	18.37	12	27.08	19	27.74	18	12.41	8	13.62	6	0.89	0	63

== Ward results ==
=== Almond ===
- 2012: 1xSNP; 1xCon; 1xLib Dem
- 2017: 2xLib Dem; 1xCon; 1xSNP
- 2012-2017 Change: One Lib Dem gain.

Almond - 4 seats
Party	Candidate	FPv%	Count									
Party	Candidate	FPv%	1	2	3	4	5	6	7	8	9	10
Liberal Democrats	Kevin Lang	42.8%	6,079									
Liberal Democrats	Louise Young	8.0%	1,138	3,652								
Conservative	Graham Hutchison	16.9%	2,395	2,727	2,995							
SNP	Norrie Work (incumbent)	13.9%	1,971	2,055	2,105	2,108	2,111	2,117	2,123	2,225	2,387	3,744
SNP	Pamela Mitchell	8.7%	1,240	1,286	1,306	1,309	1,321	1,326	1,342	1,485	1,691	
Labour	Bruce Whitehead	5.5%	786	869	966	985	996	1,014	1,037	1,167		
Green	Iain McKinnon-Waddell	2.6%	375	430	495	502	510	537	558			
Scottish Libertarian	Daniel Fraser	0.7%	99	113	119	123	134	139				
Independent	John Longstaff	0.4%	56	69	89	102	120					
UKIP	Otto Inglis	0.5%	68	79	85	100						
Electorate: 25,455 Valid: 14,207 Spoilt: 129 Quota: 2,842 Turnout: 56.3%

=== City Centre ===
- 2012: 1xCon; 1xSNP; 1xLab
- 2017: 1xCon; 1xGreen; 1xLab; 1xSNP
- 2012-2017 Change: One Green gain.

City Centre - 4 seats
Party	Candidate	FPv%	Count					
Party	Candidate	FPv%	1	2	3	4	5	6
Conservative	Jo Mowat (incumbent)	32.68%	2,904					
SNP	Alasdair Rankin (incumbent)	25.07%	2,228					
Green	Claire Miller	20.52%	1,823					
Labour	Karen Doran (incumbent)	13.25%	1,177	1,372	1,512	1,534	1,566	2,424
Liberal Democrats	David Stevens	8.00%	711	1,185	1,304	1,318	1,388	
Scottish Libertarian	Peter Sidor	0.48%	43	91	135	137		
Electorate: 20,451 Valid: 8,886 Spoilt: 52 Quota: 1,776 Turnout: 8,938 (43.7%)

=== Colinton/Fairmilehead ===
- 2012: 2xCon; 1xSNP
- 2017: 2xCon; 1xLab
- 2012-2017 Change: One Labour gain from SNP

Colinton/Fairmilehead - 3 seats
Party	Candidate	FPv%	Count					
Party	Candidate	FPv%	1	2	3	4	5	6
Conservative	Jason Rust (incumbent)	33.25%	3,783					
Labour	Scott Arthur	20.59%	2,343	2,423	2,541	2,855		
Conservative	Philip Doggart	16.51%	1,879	2,580	2,602	2,724	2,727	3,430
SNP	Richard John Lewis (incumbent)	20.73%	2,359	2,387	2,610	2,712	2,714	
Liberal Democrats	David Richard Walker	4.64%	528	584	680			
Green	Sara Marsden	4.28%	487	500				
Electorate: 19,085 Valid: 11,379 Spoilt: 111 Quota: 2,845 Turnout: 60.2%

=== Corstorphine/Murrayfield ===
- 2012: 1xCon; 1xSNP; 1xLib Dem
- 2017: 1xCon; 1xSNP; 1xLib Dem
- 2012-2017 Change: No change.

Corstorphine/Murrayfield - 3 seats
Party	Candidate	FPv%	Count					
Party	Candidate	FPv%	1	2	3	4	5	6
Conservative	Scott Douglas	33.41%	3,819					
Liberal Democrats	Gillian Gloyer	30.64%	3,502					
SNP	Frank Ross (incumbent)	21.65%	2,474	2,503	2,566	2,577	2,680	2,956
Labour	June Whitelaw	7.68%	878	1,089	1,289	1,316	1,386	1,633
Green	Kate Nevens	5.23%	598	670	780	792	852	
Independent	John Ferguson Scott	0.80%	92	221	281	316		
UKIP	James Nisbet	0.58%	66	150	165			
Electorate: 19,328 Valid: 11,429 Spoilt: 101 Quota: 2,858 Turnout: 11,530 (59.7%)

=== Craigentinny/Duddingston ===
- 2012: 2xLab; 1xSNP
- 2017: 1xCon; 1xGreen; 1xLab; 1xSNP
- 2012-2017 Change: One Labour loss, one Conservative gain and one Green gain.

Craigentinny/Duddingston - 4 seats
Party	Candidate	FPv%	Count							
Party	Candidate	FPv%	1	2	3	4	5	6	7	8
Conservative	John McLellan	23.7	2,521							
SNP	Ian Campbell††††††	23.1	2,458							
Labour Co-op	Joan Griffiths (incumbent)	17.4	1,845	1,910.2	1,928.9	2,095.5	2,124.2	2,727.4		
Green	Alex Staniforth	11.7	1,244	1,266.8	1,286.6	1,427.3	1,579.3	1,623.6	1,785.8	2,656.4
SNP	Alex Lunn (incumbent, elected as Labour)	7.6	813	819.4	1,049.4	1,076.3	1,602.6	1,615.5	1,675.8	
SNP	Mridul Wadhwa	6.3	674	676.8	716.8	731.4				
Labour Co-op	Lyndsay Martin	5.9	627	660.6	665.6	740.5	747.2			
Liberal Democrats	Patrick Hadfield	4.2	448	548.6	554.9					
Electorate: 22,793 Valid: 10,630 Spoilt: 262 Quota: 2,127 Turnout: 10,892

=== Drum Brae/Gyle ===
- 2012: 1xLab; 1xSNP; 1xLib Dem
- 2017: 1xCon; 1xSNP; 1xLib Dem
- 2012-2017 Change: One Conservative gain from Labour.

Drum Brae/Gyle - 3 seats
Party	Candidate	FPv%	Count	
Party	Candidate	FPv%	1	2
Liberal Democrats	Robert Christopher Aldridge (incumbent)	33.5%	3,176	
SNP	Claire Bridgman††††	26.8%	2,541	
Conservative	Mark Brown	22.0%	2,084	2,411
Labour	Karen Ann Keil (incumbent)	13.3%	1,262	1,483
Green	Phyl Meyer	4.3%	411	521
Electorate: 18,321 Valid: 9,474 Spoilt: 82 Quota: 2,369 Turnout: 52.2%

=== Forth ===
- 2012: 2xLab; 1xSNP; 1xCon
- 2017: 2xSNP; 1xCon; 1xLab
- 2012-2017 Change: One SNP gain from Labour.

Forth - 4 seats
Party	Candidate	FPv%	Count							
Party	Candidate	FPv%	1	2	3	4	5	6	7	8
Conservative	Jim Campbell	28.38%	2,951							
Labour	Cammy Day (incumbent)	15.18%	1,579	1,710	1,731	2,157				
SNP	Eleanor Bird	17.94%	1,866	1,879	1,894	1,917	1,923	2,313		
SNP	George Gordon	13.37%	1,390	1,402	1,421	1,457	1,463	1,638	1,836	2,207
Liberal Democrats	Tim Wight	7.81%	812	1,073	1,149	1,200	1,220	1,572	1,582	
Green	Gillian Mackay	9.99%	1,039	1,085	1,130	1,165	1,178			
Labour	Heather Pugh	5.55%	577	623	651					
Independent	Nicola Ross	1.78%	185	269						
Electorate: 23,348 Valid: 10,399 Spoilt: 214 Quota: 2,080 Turnout: 45.5%

=== Fountainbridge/Craiglockhart ===
- 2012: 1xGreen; 1xLab; 1xSNP
- 2017: 1xCon; 1xGreen; 1xSNP
- 2012-2017 Change: One Conservative gain from Labour.

Fountainbridge/Craiglockhart - 3 seats
Party	Candidate	FPv%	Count					
Party	Candidate	FPv%	1	2	3	4	5	6
Conservative	Andrew Johnston	31.80%	2,908					
Green	Gavin Corbett (incumbent)	27.61%	2,525					
SNP	David Key (incumbent)	21.04%	1,924	1,939	2,028	2,043	2,125	2,755
Labour	Anne Wimberley	13.84%	1,266	1,395	1,458	1,482	1,864	
Liberal Democrats	Jenni Lang	5.04%	461	659	705	732		
Independent	Rojan Subramani	0.68%	62	91	101			
Electorate: 17,032 Valid: 9,146 Spoilt: 59 Quota: 2,287 Turnout: 9,205 (54.0%)

=== Inverleith ===
- 2012: 1xSNP; 1xCon; 1xLab; 1xGreen
- 2017: 2xCon; 1xLib Dem; 1xSNP
- 2012-2017 Change: One Conservative & Liberal Democrat gain from Labour and Green.

Inverleith - 4 seats
Party	Candidate	FPv%	Count							
Party	Candidate	FPv%	1	2	3	4	5	6	7	8
Liberal Democrats	Hal Osler	16.59%	2,251	2,253	2,388	2,870				
Conservative	Max Mitchell	19.79%	2,685	2,691	2,707	2,840				
SNP	Gavin Barrie (incumbent)††	18.96%	2,572	2,576	2,611	2,811				
Conservative	Iain Whyte (incumbent)	17.12%	2,323	2,325	2,371	2,411	2,459	2,571	2,573	3,103
Green	Nigel Bagshaw (incumbent)	12.30%	1,669	1,674	1,748	2,182	2,244	2,248	2,316	
Labour	James Dalgleish	12.39%	1,678	1,681	1,704					
Independent	Tina Woolnough	2.63%	357	362						
Scottish Libertarian	Tom Laird	0.24%	32							
Electorate: 24,275 Valid: 13,567 Spoilt: 147 Quota: 2,714 Turnout: 56.5%

=== Leith ===
- 2012: 1xLab; 1xGreen; 1xSNP
- 2017: 1xGreen; 1xLab; 1xSNP
- 2012-2017 Change: No change.

Leith - 3 seats
Party	Candidate	FPv%	Count			
Party	Candidate	FPv%	1	2	3	4
SNP	Adam McVey (incumbent)	36.16%	2,753			
Green	Chas Booth (incumbent)	22.26%	1,695	2,213		
Labour Co-op	Gordon John Munro (incumbent)	20.35%	1,549	1,690	1,821	2,106
Conservative	Paul Penman	15.93%	1,213	1,236	1,246	1,354
Liberal Democrats	Sanne Dijkstra-Downie	5.29%	403	448	552	
Electorate: 17,432 Valid: 7,613 Spoilt: 62 Quota: 1,904 Turnout: 7,675 (44.0%)

=== Leith Walk ===
- 2012: 2xLab; 1xSNP; 1xGreen
- 2017: 2xSNP; 1xGreen; 1xLab
- 2012-2017 Change: One SNP gain from Labour.

Leith Walk - 4 seats
Party	Candidate	FPv%	Count								
Party	Candidate	FPv%	1	2	3	4	5	6	7	8	9
Green	Susan Rae	19.69%	2,097	2,105	2,125	2,246					
SNP	Lewis Ritchie (incumbent)†	17.84%	1,900	1,901	1,903	1,923	1,949.4	2,052.2	2,090.4	2,125.9	2,209.4
SNP	Amy McNeese-Mechan	16.62%	1,770	1,772	1,777	1,788	1,817.5	1,870.9	1,912.9	1,971.4	2,107.7
Labour	Marion Donaldson (incumbent)†††††	15.04%	1,602	1,605	1,617	1,692	1,715.9	1,821.6	2,529.8		
Conservative	Cristina Marga	14.42%	1,536	1,541	1,544	1,600	1,602.6	1,683.2	1,719.3	1,784.5	
Labour	Nick Gardner (incumbent)	7.45%	793	795	803	839	849.3	912.7			
Independent	Harald Tobermann	4.06%	432	459	463	511	522.6				
Liberal Democrats	Vita Zaporozcenko	3.74%	398	400	403						
Socialist Labour	David Don Jacobsen	0.62%	66	67							
Independent	Alan Gordon Melville	0.52%	55								
Electorate: 24,160 Valid: 10,649 Spoilt: 167 Quota: 2,130 Turnout: 10,816 (44.8%)

=== Liberton/Gilmerton ===
- 2012: 2xLab; 1xSNP; 1xCon
- 2017: 2xSNP; 1xCon; 1xLab
- 2012-2017 Change: One SNP gain from Labour.

Liberton/Gilmerton - 4 seats
Party	Candidate	FPv%	Count					
Party	Candidate	FPv%	1	2	3	4	5	6
Labour	Lezley Marion Cameron	24.81%	2,911					
Conservative	Stephanie Smith	23.24%	2,726					
SNP	Derek Howie †††††††	17.49%	2,052	2,086	2,093	2,200	2,292	2,564
SNP	Lesley MacInnes	16.17%	1,913	1,931	1,938	2,095	2,168	2,401
Labour	Tim Pogson	7.46%	875	1,295	1,376	1,511	1,881	
Liberal Democrats	John Christopher Knox	5.52%	648	682	794	941		
Green	John Nichol	5.17%	606	617	637			
Electorate: 25,648 Valid: 11,731 Spoilt: 264 Quota: 2,347 Turnout: 11,995 (46.8%)

=== Morningside ===
- 2012: 1xCon; 1xGreen; 1xLab; 1xSNP
- 2017: 1xCon; 1xGreen; 1xLib Dem; 1xLab
- 2012-2017 Change: One Liberal Democrat gain from SNP.

Morningside - 4 seats
Party	Candidate	FPv%	Count				
Party	Candidate	FPv%	1	2	3	4	5
Conservative	Nick Cook *	22.17%	3,010				
Green	Melanie Main (incumbent)	19.36%	2,629	2,631	2,721		
Liberal Democrats	Neil Ross	15.02%	2,039	2,054	2,508	2,510	3,477
Labour	Mandy Watt	18.21%	2,473	2,480	2,699	2,701	3,441
SNP	Sandy Howat (incumbent)	17.87%	2,427	2,429	2,450	2,452	
Conservative	Chris Land	7.37%	1,001	1,260			
Electorate: 23,861 Valid: 13,579 Spoilt: 103 Quota: 2,716 Turnout: 13,682 (57.3%)

* = Outgoing Councillor from a different Ward.

=== Pentland Hills ===
- 2012: 1xSNP; 1xLab; 1xCon
- 2017: 2xCon; 1xLab; 1xSNP
- 2012-2017 Change: One Conservative gain.

Pentland Hills - 4 seats
Party	Candidate	FPv%	Count	
Party	Candidate	FPv%	1	2
Conservative	Graeme Bruce	27.2%	3,083	
SNP	Neil Gardiner	21.1%	2,382	
Labour	Ricky Henderson (incumbent)	20.6%	2,334	
Conservative	Susan Webber	14.0%	1,587	2,293
SNP	Ernesta Noreikiene	7.8%	880	888
Liberal Democrats	Emma Farthing	4.9%	560	608
Green	Evelyn Weston	4.3%	489	499
Electorate: 22,920 Valid: 11,315 Spoilt: 262 Quota: 2,264 Turnout: 50.5%

=== Portobello/Craigmillar ===
- 2012: 2xLab; 1xSNP
- 2017: 1xCon; 1xGreen; 1xLab; 1xSNP
- 2012-2017 Change: One Labour loss, one Conservative gain and one Green gain.

Portobello/Craigmillar - 4 seats
Party	Candidate	FPv%	Count					
Party	Candidate	FPv%	1	2	3	4	5	6
Labour	Maureen Child (incumbent)	22.80%	2,378					
Conservative	Callum Laidlaw	19.48%	2,032	2,057	2,114			
SNP	Kate Campbell	16.96%	1,769	1,785	1,799	1,800	1,906	3,355
Green	Mary Campbell	15.10%	1,575	1,621	1,702	1,705	1,950	2,073
SNP	Mike Bridgman (incumbent)	15.60%	1,627	1,640	1,652	1,653	1,749	
Labour	David Walker (incumbent)	7.59%	792	941	1,001	1,010		
Liberal Democrats	Callum Leslie	2.47%	258	271				
Electorate: 22,360 Valid: 10,431 Spoilt: 223 Quota: 2,087 Turnout: 10,654 (47.6%)

=== Sighthill/Gorgie ===
- 2012: 2xLab; 2xSNP
- 2017: 2xSNP; 1xCon; 1xLab
- 2012-2017 Change: One Conservative gain from Labour.

Sighthill/Gorgie - 4 seats
Party	Candidate	FPv%	Count						
Party	Candidate	FPv%	1	2	3	4	5	6	7
SNP	Catherine Fullerton (incumbent)	18.5%	1,574	1,575	1,582	1,888			
Conservative	Ashley Graczyk†††	19.09%	1,621	1,625	1,694	1,701			
Labour	Donald Wilson (incumbent)	11.69%	993	995	1,048	1,063	1,071.4	1,071.7	1,821.9
SNP	Denis Dixon (incumbent)	14.01%	1,190	1,191	1,204	1,452	1,596.7	1,596.8	1,621.8
Green	Dan Heap	14.9%	1,264	1,269	1,356	1,405	1,421.3	1,421.6	1,471.4
Labour	Carmel Smith	9.94%	844	845	902	909	914	914.5	
SNP	Simon Hayter	7.63%	648	648	653				
Liberal Democrats	Devin Scott Scobie	3.91%	332	338					
Scottish Libertarian	Calum Strange	0.32%	27						
Electorate: 21,885 Valid: 8,493 Spoilt: 219 Quota: 1,699 Turnout: 8,712 (39.8%)

=== Southside/Newington ===
- 2012: 1xGreen; 1xLab; 1xSNP; 1xCon
- 2017: 1xCon; 1xGreen; 1xLab 1xSNP
- 2012-2017 Change: No Change.

Southside/Newington - 4 seats
Party	Candidate	FPv%	Count
Party	Candidate	FPv%	1
Conservative	Cameron Rose (incumbent)	26.93%	3,151
SNP	Alison Dickie	20.54%	2,403
Green	Steve Burgess (incumbent)	20.35%	2,381
Labour	Ian Perry (incumbent)	20.12%	2,354
Liberal Democrats	Dan Farthing	12.05%	1,410
Electorate: 22,338 Valid: 11,699 Spoilt: 73 Quota: 2,340 Turnout: 11,772 (52.7%)

== Changes since 2017 ==
- † On 20 February 2018, Leith Walk SNP councillor Lewis Ritchie resigned from the party and became an independent, following complaints about his behaviour arising out of allegedly punching someone in a taxi.
- †† On 23 April 2018, Inverleith SNP councillor Gavin Barrie resigned from the party and became an independent, after losing his position in the ruling administration as Economy Convener, following a vote at the SNP group AGM.
- ††† On 4 July 2018, Sighthill/Gorgie Conservative councillor Ashley Graczyk resigned from the party and became an independent, saying the UK government’s policies on disability issues and social justice are “incompatible with her beliefs and conscience”.
- †††† On 17 July 2018, Drum Brae/Gyle SNP councillor Claire Bridgman resigned from the party for undisclosed reasons and became an independent.
- ††††† On 28 January 2019, Leith Walk Labour councillor Marion Donaldson announced she was resigning from the Council citing reports of internal party tensions. A by-election was held on 11 April 2019 and was won by Robb Munn of the SNP.
- †††††† On 21 February 2020, SNP Craigentinny/Duddingston councillor Ian Campbell stood down for health reasons. A by-election was held on 12 November 2020 and was won by the SNP's Ethan Young.
- ††††††† On 30 July 2020, SNP Liberton/Gilmerton councillor Derek Howie resigned from the SNP Group to become an independent.

== By-elections since 2017 ==
Leith Walk By-election (11 April 2019)
Party	Candidate	FPv%	Count										
Party	Candidate	FPv%	1	2	3	4	5	6	7	8	9	10	11
SNP	Rob Munn	35.7	2,596	2,598	2,598	2,598	2,612	2,616	2,630	2,721	2,763	3,021	4,487
Green	Lorna Slater	25.5	1,855	1,856	1,856	1,856	1,865	1,869	1,904	2,093	2,223	2,765	
Labour	Nick Gardner	15.5	1,123	1,124	1,124	1,126	1,136	1,140	1,157	1,320	1,497		
Conservative	Dan McCroskrie	10.7	777	777	779	781	784	811	825	912			
Liberal Democrats	Jack Caldwell	8.6	623	624	624	626	628	633	652				
Independent	Kevin Illingworth	1.5	110	112	112	122	126	143					
UKIP	Steven Alexander	1.2	85	88	97	97	98						
Socialist Labour	David Jacobsen	0.8	56	56	56	56							
Independent	John Scott	0.2	16	16	17								
For Britain	Paul Stirling	0.2	14	14									
Scottish Libertarian	Tom Laird	0.2	12										
Electorate: 24,197 Valid: 7,267 Spoilt: 67 Quota: 3,634 Turnout: 30.3%

Craigentinny/Duddingston By-election (12 November 2020)
Party	Candidate	FPv%	Count					
Party	Candidate	FPv%	1	2	3	4	5	6
SNP	Ethan Young	38.9	2,920	2,924	2,936	3,004	3,716	3,818
Conservative	Eleanor Price	18.9	1,420	1,428	1,448	1,582	1,620	
Labour	Margaret Graham	16.1	1,205	1,205	1,216	1,359	1,682	2,085
Green	Benjamin Parker	15.8	1,185	1,189	1,203	1,340		
Liberal Democrats	Elaine Ford	8.4	631	634	647			
Independent	Andrew McDonald	1.2	93	100				
Scottish Libertarian	Tam Laird	0.6	42					
Electorate: 23,972 Valid: 7,496 Spoilt: 86 Quota: 3,749 Turnout: 31.6%

== Retiring Councillors ==
Council Ward	Departing Councillor	Party
Almond	Lindsay Paterson	Conservative
Almond	Alastair Shields†	Independent
Corstorphine/Murrayfield	Jeremy Balfour	Conservative
Corstorphine/Murrayfield	Paul Edie	Liberal Democrat
Colinton/Fairmilehead	Elaine Aitken	Conservative
Craigentinny/Duddingston	Stefan Tymkewycz	Scottish National Party
Drum Brae/Gyle	Ronald Cairns	Scottish National Party
Fountainbridge/Craiglockhart	Andrew Burns	Labour
Forth	Allan Jackson	Conservative
Inverleith	Lesley Hinds	Labour
Liberton/Gilmerton	Norma Austin Hart	Labour
Liberton/Gilmerton	Keith Robson	Labour
Meadows/Morningside	Paul Godzik	Labour
Meadows/Morningside	Mark McInnes	Conservative
Pentland Hills	Bill Henderson	Scottish National Party
Pentland Hills	Dominic Heslop	Conservative
Sighthill/Gorgie	Eric Milligan	Labour
Southside/Newington	Jim Orr††	Independent

† Originally elected as a Liberal Democrat candidate.
†† Originally elected as a Scottish National Party candidate.
