= Pentland Hills (ward) =

Electoral ward in Edinburgh, Scotland

Location of the ward within Edinburgh (pre-2017 boundaries)

Pentland Hills is one of the seventeen wards used to elect members of the City of Edinburgh Council. Established in 2007 along with the other wards, it mainly covers the villages and suburban developments in the south-west hinterland beyond the A720 Edinburgh city bypass road (Baberton, Balerno, Currie, Juniper Green and Ratho, plus the campus of Heriot-Watt University), up to the boundaries with West Lothian, Midlothian and a small border with the Scottish Borders at the edge of the Pentland Hills.

Initially electing three councillors, within the bypass it covered the Kingsknowe neighbourhood and the southern part of the Wester Hailes housing scheme plus its smaller neighbour Clovenstone; the boundaries were redrawn for the 2017 election, losing Kingsknowe but gaining the northern part of Wester Hailes plus the Calders area, with the population increasing and four councillors being returned. In 2019, the ward had a population of 32,703.

== Councillors ==
Election	Councillors			
2007	Ronald Cairns (SNP)	Alastair S Paisley (Conservative)	Ricky Henderson (Labour)	3 seats
2012	Bill Henderson (SNP)	Dominic Heslop (Conservative)	Ricky Henderson (Labour)	3 seats
2017	Neil Gardiner (SNP)	Graeme Bruce (Conservative)	Ricky Henderson (Labour)	Sue Webber (Conservative)
2022	Neil Gardiner (SNP)	Graeme Bruce (Conservative)	Stephen Philip Jenkinson (Labour)	Fiona Glasgow (SNP)

== Election results ==
=== 2022 election ===
Pentland Hills - 4 seats
Party	Candidate	FPv%	Count								
Party	Candidate	FPv%	1	2	3	4	5	6	7	8	9
Conservative	Graeme Bruce (incumbent)	22.8	2,531								
SNP	Neil Thomas Gardiner (incumbent)	21.3	2,360								
Labour	Stephen Philip Jenkinson	17.1	1,896	1,911	1,917	1,918	1,944	2,155	2,632		
Conservative	Emma Gilchrist	11.2	1,239	1,482	1,484	1,487	1,532	1,558	1,760	1,827	
SNP	Fiona Glasgow	10.1	1,115	1,121	1,236	1,239	1,254	1,674	1,755	1,841	1,994
Liberal Democrats	Michael William Chappell	8.0	885	909	911	918	940	1,094			
Green	Ross Muller	7.8	870	875	883	890	908				
Scottish Family	Richard Fettes	1.4	159	165	166	172					
Scottish Libertarian	Louis Rowlands	0.3	32	32	33						
Electorate: 24,312 Valid: 11,087 Spoilt: 179 Quota: 2,218 Turnout: 46.3%

=== 2017 election ===
2017 City of Edinburgh Council election

Pentland Hills - 4 seats
Party	Candidate	FPv%	Count	
Party	Candidate	FPv%	1	2
Conservative	Graeme Bruce	27.2%	3,083	
SNP	Neil Gardiner	21.1%	2,382	
Labour	Ricky Henderson (incumbent)	20.6%	2,334	
Conservative	Susan Webber	14.0%	1,587	2,293
SNP	Ernesta Noreikiene	7.8%	880	888
Liberal Democrats	Emma Farthing	4.9%	560	608
Green	Evelyn Weston	4.3%	489	499
Electorate: 22,920 Valid: 11,315 Spoilt: 262 Quota: 2,264 Turnout: 50.5%

=== 2012 election ===
2012 City of Edinburgh Council election

Pentland Hills - 3 seats
Party	Candidate	FPv%	Count						
Party	Candidate	FPv%	1	2	3	4	5	6	7
SNP	Bill Henderson	29.16%	2,317						
Labour	Ricky Henderson (incumbent)	28.85%	2,293						
Conservative	Dominic Heslop	15.09%	1,199	1,224	1,249	1,335	1,397	1,502	2,446
Conservative	Shelia Low	12.61%	1,002	1,017	1,040	1,099	1,154	1,240	
Green	Phyl Meyer	4.05%	322	400	468	607	840		
Independent	Mike 'Professor Pongoo' Ferrigan	5.59%	444	491	531	590			
Liberal Democrats	Stuart Bridges	4.66%	370	414	462				
Electorate: 18,002 Valid: 7,947 Spoilt: 51 Quota: 1,987 Turnout: 7,998 (44.4%)

=== 2007 election ===
2007 City of Edinburgh Council election

2007 Council election: Pentland Hills
Party	Candidate	FPv%	Count					
Party	Candidate	FPv%	1	2	3	4	5	6
Conservative	Alastair S. Paisley	22.9	2,523	2,532	2,536	2,565	2,718	4,401
SNP	Ronald Cairns	20.3	2,238	2,247	2,274	2,374	2,661	2,789
Labour	Ricky Henderson	19.5	2,148	2,161	2,181	2,263	2,663	2,798
Conservative	Andy MacIver	18.8	2,074	2,081	2,084	2,113	2,285	
Liberal Democrats	Iain J. Coleman	11.4	1,255	1,281	1,299	1,471		
Green	Shonagh McEwan	4.3	479	488	518			
Scottish Socialist	Alister H. Black	1.1	116	117				
Liberal	Irvine McMinn	0.9	94					
Electorate: 17,390 Valid: 10,927 Spoilt: 104 Quota: 2,732 Turnout: 62.83%
