= Colinton/Fairmilehead (ward) =

Electoral ward of Edinburgh, Scotland

Location of the ward within Edinburgh

Colinton/Fairmilehead is one of the seventeen wards used to elect members of the City of Edinburgh Council. Established in 2007 along with the other wards, it elects three Councillors.

As its name suggests, the ward's territory is based around the communities of Colinton and Fairmilehead in the far south of the city's urban area up to the boundary with Midlothian, also including Bonaly, Comiston, Firrhill, Hunter's Tryst / New Swanston, Oxgangs and Redford, plus the separate hamlet of Swanston. In 2019, the ward had a population of 25,257.

== Councillors ==
Election	Councillors		
2007	Elaine Aitken (Conservative)	Jason Rust (Conservative)	Eric Barry (Labour)
2012	Elaine Aitken (Conservative)	Jason Rust (Conservative)	Richard Lewis (SNP)
2017	Philip Doggart (Conservative)	Jason Rust (Conservative)	Scott Arthur (Labour)
2022	Marco Biagi (SNP)	Jason Rust (Conservative)	Scott Arthur (Labour)
2024 by-election	Marco Biagi (SNP)	Jason Rust (Conservative)	Louise Spence (Liberal Democrats)
2025 by-election	Conor Savage (Labour)	Jason Rust (Conservative)	Neil Cuthbert (Conservative)

== Election results ==
=== 2025 by-election ===
Colinton/Fairmilehead by-election (23 January 2025) – 2 seats
Party	Candidate	FPv%	Count												
Party	Candidate	FPv%	1	2	3	4	5	6	7	8	9	10	11	12	13
Conservative	Neil Cuthbert	32.6	2,027	2,027	2,028	2,030	2,034	2,039	2,050	2,100					
Labour	Connor Savage	18.4	1,146	1,147	1,148	1,149	1,152	1,159	1,166	1,191	1,193	1,209	1,342	1,615	2,192
Liberal Democrats	Peter Nicholson	16.2	1,009	1,009	1,009	1,009	1,012	1,015	1,023	1,059	1,064	1,103	1,187	1,380	
SNP	Marianna Clyde	13.5	840	840	840	843	843	848	849	870	870	892	1,032		
Scottish Green	Daniel Milligan	6.8	426	426	426	426	432	436	444	460	460	467			
Reform UK	Grant Lidster	5.5	345	345	345	347	348	354	364	384	387				
Independent	Marc Wilkinson	4.1	256	256	258	260	264	278	288						
Scottish Family	Richard Lucas	1.0	65	65	68	69	70	70							
Independent	David Henry	0.6	38	38	43	54	61								
Independent	Bonnie Prince Bob	0.5	30	32	32	32									
Independent	Mev Brown	0.4	23	23	25										
Independent	Nick Horning	0.2	13	15											
Independent	Mark Ney-Party	0.1	5												
Electorate: 19,669 Valid: 6,223 Spoilt: 58 Quota: 2,075 Turnout: 31.9%

=== 2024 by-election ===
Colinton/Fairmilehead by-election (14 November 2024) – 1 seat
Party	Candidate	FPv%	Count										
Party	Candidate	FPv%	1	2	3	4	5	6	7	8	9	10	11
Liberal Democrats	Louise Spence	36.3	2,683	2,684	2,685	2,687	2,697	2,704	2,763	2,793	2,898	3,096	3,751
Conservative	Neil Cuthbert	19.6	1,454	1,458	1,458	1,465	1,476	1,483	1,517	1,638	1,643	1,676	
Labour	Sheila Gilmore	19.5	1,441	1,441	1,444	1,446	1,453	1,463	1,480	1,495	1,611	1,886	2,055
SNP	Marianna Clyde	10.8	800	800	800	801	806	816	826	835	963		
Scottish Green	Daniel Milligan	5.3	393	393	396	397	402	407	414	423			
Reform UK	Grant Lidster	3.6	268	269	269	281	283	287	300				
Independent	Marc Wilkinson	2.3	173	173	175	177	179	190					
Independent	David Henry	0.8	57	57	57	63	75						
Scottish Family	Richard Lucas	0.7	51	51	51								
Independent	Mev Brown	0.7	50	51	60	62							
Independent	Bonnie Prince Bob	0.3	22	22									
Scottish Libertarian	Tam Laird	0.1	9										
Electorate: 19,907 Valid: 7,401 Spoilt: 45 Quota: 3,701 Turnout: 37.4%

=== 2022 election ===
Colinton/Fairmilehead - 3 seats
Party	Candidate	FPv%	Count						
Party	Candidate	FPv%	1	2	3	4	5	6	7
Labour	Scott Arthur (incumbent)	33.4	3,812						
Conservative	Jason Rust (incumbent)	20.3	2,317	2,435	2,480	2,507	3,512		
SNP	Marco Biagi	17.3	1,969	2,123	2,142	2,561	2,590	2,614	3,216
Liberal Democrats	Louise Watson Spence	12.4	1,416	1,719	1,739	1,950	2,044	2,329	
Conservative	Neil Cuthbert	9.6	1,100	1,185	1,211	1,221			
Scottish Green	Helen McCabe	5.4	621	739	763				
Scottish Family	Richard Crewe Lucas	1.6	179	195					
Electorate: 19,454 Valid: 11,414 Spoilt: 126 Quota: 2,854 Turnout: 59.3%

=== 2017 election ===
2017 City of Edinburgh Council election

Colinton/Fairmilehead - 3 seats
Party	Candidate	FPv%	Count					
Party	Candidate	FPv%	1	2	3	4	5	6
Conservative	Jason Rust (incumbent)	33.25%	3,783					
Labour	Scott Arthur	20.59%	2,343	2,423	2,541	2,855		
Conservative	Philip Doggart	16.51%	1,879	2,580	2,602	2,724	2,727	3,430
SNP	Richard John Lewis (incumbent)	20.73%	2,359	2,387	2,610	2,712	2,714	
Liberal Democrats	David Richard Walker	4.64%	528	584	680			
Scottish Green	Sara Marsden	4.28%	487	500				
Electorate: 19,085 Valid: 11,379 Spoilt: 111 Quota: 2,845 Turnout: 60.2%

=== 2012 election ===
2012 City of Edinburgh Council election

Colinton/Fairmilehead - 3 seats
Party	Candidate	FPv%	Count						
Party	Candidate	FPv%	1	2	3	4	5	6	7
Conservative	Jason Rust (incumbent)	28.71%	2,692						
Conservative	Elaine Aitken (incumbent)	23.29%	2,184	2,427					
SNP	Richard Lewis	20.59%	1,931	1,953	1,962	1,975	2,021	2,187	2,816
Labour	Eric Barry (incumbent)	17.87%	1,676	1,699	1,708	1,724	1,831	2,070	
Scottish Green	Andy Saunders	4.91%	460	474	484	501	647		
Liberal Democrats	Alan Beal	3.62%	339	350	365	368			
UKIP	Malcolm MacKay	1.01%	95	100	105				
Electorate: 18,521 Valid: 9,377 Spoilt: 74 (0.78%) Quota: 2,345 Turnout: 9,451 (51%)

=== 2007 Election ===
2007 City of Edinburgh Council election

2007 Council election: Colinton/Fairmilehead
Party	Candidate	FPv%	Count					
Party	Candidate	FPv%	1	2	3	4	5	6
Conservative	Elaine Aitken	23.1	2,877	2,878	2,907	3,111		
Conservative	Jason Rust	22.6	2,815	2,816	2,844	2,994	3,012.70	3,595.21
Labour	Eric Barry	18.7	2,332	2,41	2,442	2,758	2,760.15	3,639.03
SNP	Thomas Kielty	14.9	1,861	1,881	1,983			
Liberal Democrats	Stuart Bridges	14.8	1,842	1,845	2,020	2,589	2,593.21	
Scottish Green	Alastair J Tibbitt	4.2	517	546				
Scottish Socialist	Robert Mathie	0.6	80					
Electorate: 18,413 Valid: 12,324 Spoilt: 132 Quota: 3,082 Turnout: 67.6%
