= City Centre (Edinburgh ward) =

Electoral ward in Edinburgh, Scotland

Location of the ward within Edinburgh

City Centre is one of the seventeen wards used to elect members of the City of Edinburgh Council. Established in 2007 along with the other wards, it elects four Councillors. As its name suggests, the ward's territory is based around a compact area in the centre of Edinburgh, including Calton Hill, the Canongate, Haymarket, Lauriston, the New Town, the Old Town, West Coates and the West End. A minor 2017 boundary change saw the loss of Abbeyhill and the gain of Tollcross and Dumbiedykes, but the overall population rose considerably and one further representative was added. In 2019, the ward had a population of 32,410.

== Councillors ==
Election	Councillors			
2007	Charles C Dundas (Liberal Democrats)	Joanna Mowat (Conservative)	David Beckett (SNP)	3 seats
2011 by	Charles C Dundas (Liberal Democrats)	Joanna Mowat (Conservative)	Alasdair Rankin (SNP)	3 seats
2012	Karen Doran (Labour)	Joanna Mowat (Conservative)	Alasdair Rankin (SNP)	3 seats
2017	Karen Doran (Labour)	Joanna Mowat (Conservative)	Alasdair Rankin (SNP)	Claire Miller (Greens)
2022	Margaret Graham (Labour)	Joanna Mowat (Conservative)	Finlay McFarlane (SNP)	Claire Miller (Greens)

== Election results ==
=== 2022 election ===
City Centre - 4 seats
Party	Candidate	FPv%	Count												
Party	Candidate	FPv%	1	2	3	4	5	6	7	8	9	10	11	12	13
Conservative	Jo Mowat (incumbent)	21.4	1,896												
Green	Claire Miller (incumbent)	19.8	1,755	1,760	1,760	1,761	1,765	1,770	1,784						
Liberal Democrats	Andy Foxall	15.1	1,341	1,396	1,396	1,398	1,402	1,415	1,422	1,423	1,449	1,476	1,495	1,551	
Labour	Margaret Arma Graham	14.6	1,297	1,315	1,318	1,318	1,319	1,326	1,333	1,336	1,348	1,385	1,471	1,570	2,349
SNP	Finlay McFarlane	13.3	1,182	1,183	1,185	1,187	1,190	1,191	1,203	1,206	1,210	1,237	2,120		
SNP	Marianne Mwiki	11.1	984	985	987	987	988	990	1,004	1,008	1,011	1,033			
Independent	Bonnie Prince Bob	1.3	117	119	119	119	121	125	153	153	182				
Alba	Kevan Shaw	1.2	105	106	108	108	109	110							
Independent	Norrie Rowan	0.9	84	90	90	97	100	114	126	126					
Independent	Kevin Illingworth	0.6	50	52	52	52	58								
Independent	Pete Carson	0.2	21	22	23	24									
Independent	Paul R. Penman	0.2	14	16	18										
Independent	Maria Pakpahan-Campbell	0.1	11	12											
Electorate: 23,510 Valid: 8,857 Spoilt: 81 Quota: 1,772 Turnout: 37.7%

=== 2017 election ===
2017 City of Edinburgh Council election

City Centre - 4 seats
Party	Candidate	FPv%	Count					
Party	Candidate	FPv%	1	2	3	4	5	6
Conservative	Jo Mowat (incumbent)	32.68%	2,904					
SNP	Alasdair Rankin (incumbent)	25.07%	2,228					
Green	Claire Miller	20.52%	1,823					
Labour	Karen Doran (incumbent)	13.25%	1,177	1,372	1,512	1,534	1,566	2,424
Liberal Democrats	David Stevens	8.00%	711	1,185	1,304	1,318	1,388	
Scottish Libertarian	Peter Sidor	0.48%	43	91	135	137		
Electorate: 20,451 Valid: 8,886 Spoilt: 52 Quota: 1,776 Turnout: 8,938 (43.7%)

=== 2012 election ===
2012 City of Edinburgh Council election

City Centre - 3 seats
Party	Candidate	FPv%	Count					
Party	Candidate	FPv%	1	2	3	4	5	6
Conservative	Joanna Mowat (incumbent)	27.69%	1,402					
SNP	Alasdair Rankin (incumbent)	24.97%	1,264	1,272				
Labour	Karen Doran	21.33%	1,080	1,093	1,094	1,101	1,235	1,777
Green	Julita Mazurek	17.06%	864	887	890	907	1,111	
Liberal Democrats	Iain Coleman	7.94%	402	439	440	463		
Liberal	Karen Hetherington	1.01%	51	58	59			
Electorate: 13,943 Valid: 5,063 Spoilt: 38 (0.74%) Quota: 1,266 Turnout: 5,101 (36.6%)

=== 2011 by-election ===
A by-election arose following the resignation of SNP councillor David Beckett on 9 June 2011. The seat was held by the SNP's Alasdair Rankin on 18 August 2011.

City Centre By-Election (18 August 2011) - 1 seat
Party	Candidate	FPv%	Count				
Party	Candidate	FPv%	1	2	3	4	5
Conservative	Iain McGill	24.2	837	904	1,043	1,110	1,264
SNP	Alasdair Rankin	23.1	797	825	893	1,081	1,368
Labour	Karen Doran	19.7	682	716	745	968	
Green	Melanie Main	14.3	494	576	635		
Independent	John Carson	11.4	394	402			
Liberal Democrats	Alistair Hodgson	7.3	251				
Electorate: 14,810 Valid: 3,455 Spoilt: 11 Quota: 1,728 Turnout: 3,466

=== 2007 election ===
2007 City of Edinburgh Council election

2007 Council election: City Centre
Party	Candidate	FPv%	Count							
Party	Candidate	FPv%	1	2	3	4	5	6	7	8
SNP	David Beckett	20.3	1,630	1,644	1,661	1,688	1,983	2,027.02		
Conservative	Joanna Mowat	20.1	1,614	1,628	1,665	1,670	1,742	1,783.63	1,788.75	2,221.13
Liberal Democrats	Charles C Dundas	19.7	1,587	1,605	1,627	1,637	2,225			
Labour	Bill Cunningham	17.9	1,437	1,446	1,454	1,468	1,705	1,774.35	1,782.67	
Green	Gavin N Corbett	16.8	1,352	1,363	1,384	1,450				
Scottish Socialist	Catriona Grant	1.8	142	143	146					
Independent	Brian R Ferrier	1.6	130	133						
Liberal	Karen M Hetherington	1.0	83							
Electorate: 15,829 Valid: 7,975 Spoilt: 73 Quota: 1,994 Turnout: 50.8%
