= Scott Arthur =

British politician

Scott Arthur MP
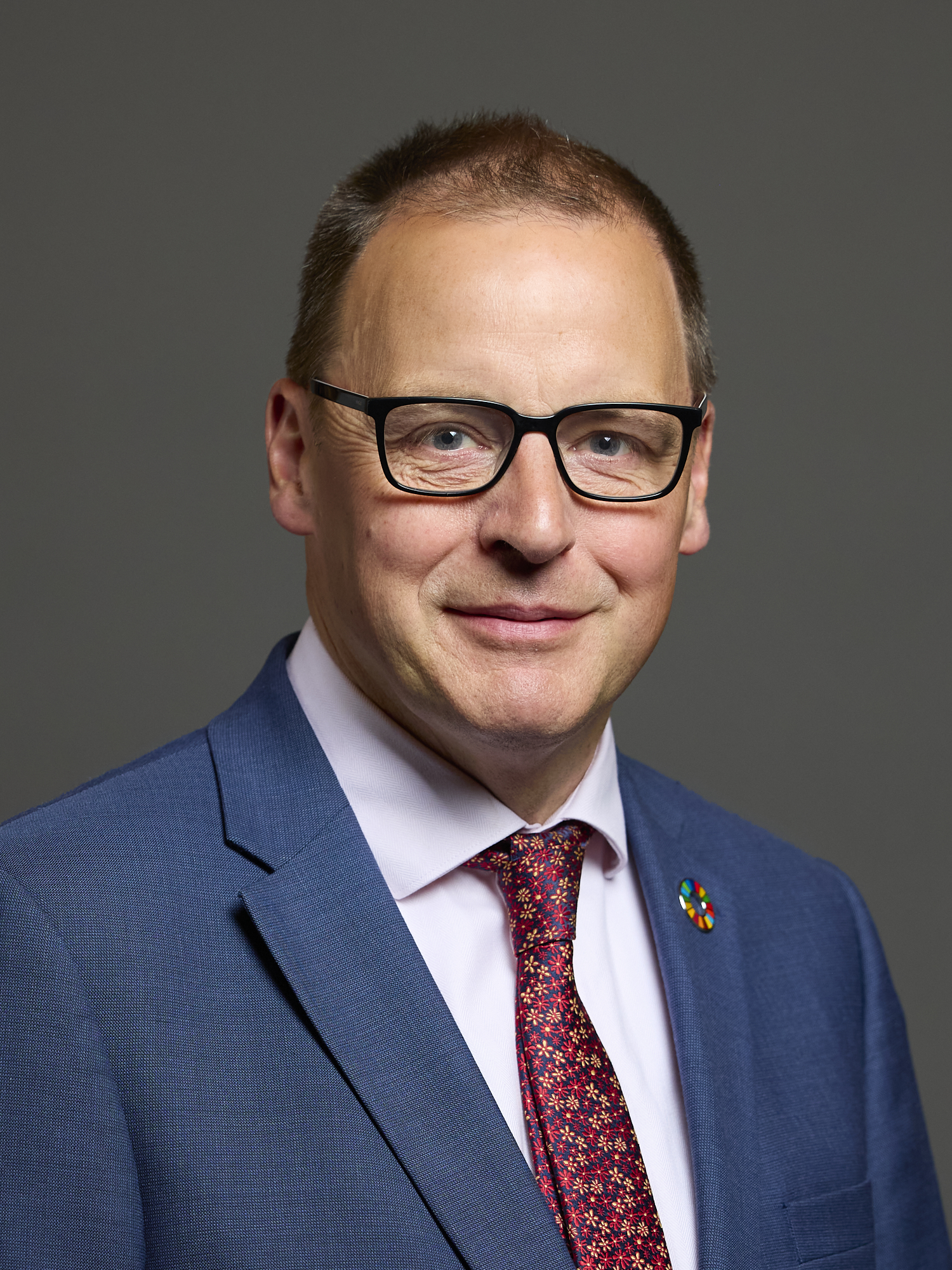
- Official portrait, 2024

Member of Parliament for Edinburgh South West
- Incumbent
- Assumed office 4 July 2024
- Preceded by: Joanna Cherry
- Majority: 6,217 (13.6%)

Member of City of Edinburgh Council for Colinton/Fairmilehead
- In office 4 May 2017 – September 2024

Personal details
- Born: June 8, 1969 (age 57)
- Party: Labour
- Education: Abertay University

Scott Arthur (born 8 June 1969) is a British academic and Labour Party politician who has served as Member of Parliament (MP) for Edinburgh South West since 2024.

== Academic career ==
Arthur joined Edinburgh's Heriot-Watt University in 2000 as a professor in the Institute for Infrastructure and Environment. His research and teaching focused on urban water management.

Since 2000, he has co-edited books covering the International Conference on Advances in Civil Engineering.

== Political career ==
=== Councillor ===
Arthur was first elected councillor for the Colinton/Fairmilehead at the 2017 City of Edinburgh Council election as a member of the Labour Party. He was re-elected in 2022.

In May 2022, Arthur was appointed the Transport and Environment Convener in the Labour Party's minority administration of the City of Edinburgh Council. He said at the time that the position would be interim and he would be standing down in October of that year following a council reshuffle.

Arthur went on to serve as the Transport and Environment Convenor until September 2024. His resignation as a councillor followed his election to the UK Parliament.

As Transport and Environment Convenor in the Council, Arthur was instrumental in advocating a new north-south route for the tram, linking Granton in the North West of the city to the BioQuarter in the South East.

Arthur was a strong proponent of the Roseburn route for the north-south line, stating it would link the tram with the Western General Hospital, along with other congestion-based benefits. This option was met with controversy due to concerns over displacement of cyclists and loss of biodiversity along the route. The consultation on the proposed routes ended in November 2025.

During his convenorship, Arthur also oversaw the ban on pavement parking in Edinburgh. The policy was designed to increase pavement accessibility for wheelchair users, those with mobility issues, the blind or partially sighted, and those pushing buggies. The ban introduced fines of £100 for pavement parking and covers all streets in the capital. The ban was praised by Guide Dogs and Living Streets UK. Since his election to Parliament, Arthur has continued to raise the issue of pavement parking.

=== Member of Parliament ===
In July 2024, Arthur was elected Member of Parliament for Edinburgh South West, beating the incumbent Scottish National Party candidate Joanna Cherry by 6,217 votes. Sue Webber MSP also stood in the election for the Scottish Conservatives, but the result saw them move from second to third with a 12.4% drop in vote.

In September 2024 he was 6th of the 20 MPs drawn in the Private Members' Bill ballot. He chose to use the ballot slot to introduce the Rare Cancers Act, focused on improving access to treatments for rare cancers patients; the Bill was sponsored in the Lords by Baroness Elliott, and it achieved Royal Assent on 5 March 2026.

In response to widespread anti-social behaviour in his constituency on Bonfire Night 2024, Arthur led a campaign to stop the sale of fireworks in supermarkets. The campaign was successful, and all major supermarkets ended their sale of fireworks in the south west of Edinburgh.

In October 2024, he was elected as a member of the Transport Select Committee.

He is a member of various APPGs including Parkrun, Eating Disorders and British Buses.

== Personal life ==
Arthur was born in Kirkcaldy and moved to Edinburgh in 1996. He is dyslexic and has spoken about his struggles with reading and writing while at school.

Arthur is married and has two children. His wife is an NHS nurse. He regularly takes part in parkrun both as a runner and volunteer.

Arthur identifies Gordon Brown as his political hero, citing his continued work to tackle child poverty in Fife.

Parliament of the United Kingdom
Preceded by Joanna Cherry	Member of Parliament for Edinburgh South West; 2024–present	Incumbent
