= Fountainbridge/Craiglockhart =

Electoral ward in Edinburgh, Scotland

Location of the ward within Edinburgh

Fountainbridge/Craiglockhart is one of the 17 wards of the City of Edinburgh Council. It elects three councillors. Established in 2007 along with the other wards, it covers a compact suburban area south-west of the centre of Edinburgh including the Chesser, Craiglockhart, Greenbank Village, Hutchison, Kingsknowe (added in a minor boundary change in 2017) and Slateford neighbourhoods, and a thin, densely populated corridor leading towards the centre taking in Fountainbridge and North Merchiston / Shandon. In 2019, the ward had a population of 23,715.

== Councillors ==
Election	Councillors		
2007	Gordon Buchan (Conservative)	Andrew Burns (Labour)	Jim Lowrie (Liberal Democrats)
2012	Gavin Corbett (Green)	Andrew Burns (Labour)	David Key (SNP)
2017	Gavin Corbett (Green)	Andrew Johnston (Conservative)	David Key (SNP)
2022	Val Walker (Labour)	Christopher Cowdy (Conservative)	David Key (SNP)
2025 by-election	Kevin McKay (Liberal Democrats)	Christopher Cowdy (Conservative)	David Key (SNP)

== Election results ==
=== 2025 by-election ===
Fountainbridge/Craiglockhart by-election (26 June 2025) – 1 seat
Party	Candidate	FPv%	Count												
Party	Candidate	FPv%	1	2	3	4	5	6	7	8	9	10	11	12	13
Labour	Catriona Munro	20.8	1,293	1,293	1,295	1,297	1,304	1,307	1,314	1,335	1,368	1,502	1,668	2,219	
Liberal Democrats	Kevin McKay	20.4	1,269	1,270	1,270	1,276	1,279	1,285	1,288	1,321	1,364	1,480	1,867	2,316	3,409
Green	Q Manivannan	18.2	1,133	1,135	1,136	1,136	1,138	1,157	1,166	1,175	1,187	1,595	1,636		
SNP	Murray Visentin	14.5	905	905	905	907	909	913	919	930	950				
Conservative	Mark Hooley	13.8	857	858	861	862	865	865	868	884	1,080	1,109			
Reform	Gary Neill	7.9	489	489	490	491	498	499	500	512					
Independent	Marc Wilkinson	1.8	111	111	118	119	120	124	130						
Independent	Steve West	0.6	39	40	45	45	45								
Independent	Bonnie Prince Bob	0.6	36	38	42	43	46	48							
Scottish Family	Richard Lucas	0.5	34	34	34	39									
Scottish Libertarian	Lukasz Furmaniak	0.4	25	26	26										
Independent	Mark Rowbotham	0.4	25	25											
Independent	Derrick Emms	0.1	9												
Electorate: 18,945 Valid: 6,264 Spoilt: 39 Quota: 3,113 Turnout: 33.1%

=== 2022 election ===
Fountainbridge/Craiglockhart - 3 seats
Party	Candidate	FPv%	Count						
Party	Candidate	FPv%	1	2	3	4	5	6	7
Conservative	Christopher Cowdy	26.6	2,399						
SNP	David Key (incumbent)	22.7	2,051	2,053	2,058	2,064	2,121	2,145	3,546
Labour	Val Walker	22.4	2,026	2,061	2,067	2,083	2,408		
Green	Megan McHaney	19.9	1,800	1,805	1,812	1,824	1,971	2,026	
Liberal Democrats	Fraser John Ashmore Graham	7.1	642	691	700	719			
Scottish Family	Fraser Kenneth Ramsay	0.8	69	76	85				
Scottish Libertarian	Gregor Masson	0.5	41	44					
Electorate: 18,284 Valid: 9,028 Spoilt: 84 Quota: 2,258 Turnout: 49.8%

=== 2017 election ===
2017 Council election: Fountainbridge/Craiglockhart - 3 seats
Party	Candidate	FPv%	Count					
Party	Candidate	FPv%	1	2	3	4	5	6
Conservative	Andrew Johnston	31.80%	2,908					
Green	Gavin Corbett (incumbent)	27.61%	2,525					
SNP	David Key (incumbent)	21.04%	1,924	1,939	2,028	2,043	2,125	2,755
Labour	Anne Wimberley	13.84%	1,266	1,395	1,458	1,482	1,864	
Liberal Democrats	Jenni Lang	5.04%	461	659	705	732		
Independent	Rojan Subramani	0.68%	62	91	101			
Electorate: 17,032 Valid: 9,146 Spoilt: 59 Quota: 2,287 Turnout: 9,205 (54.0%)

=== 2012 election ===
2012 Council election: Fountainbridge/Craiglockhart - 3 seats
Party	Candidate	FPv%	Count				
Party	Candidate	FPv%	1	2	3	4	5
Green	Gavin Corbett	24.07%	1,789	1,801	2,004		
SNP	David Key	23.54%	1,750	1,755	1,811	1,848	1,861
Labour	Andrew Burns (incumbent)	23.24%	1,728	1,734	1,851	1,905	
Conservative	Will Searle	21.15%	1,572	1,578	1,714	1,731	1,738
Liberal Democrats	Jim Lowrie (incumbent)	7.34%	546	561			
Liberal	Tim Strode	0.66%	49				
Electorate: 17,069 Valid: 7,434 Spoilt: 70 (0.93%) Quota: 1,859 Turnout: 7,504 (44%)

=== 2007 election ===
2007 Council election: Fountainbridge/Craiglockhart (3 seats)
Party	Candidate	FPv%	Count						
Party	Candidate	FPv%	1	2	3	4	5	6	7
Conservative	Gordon Buchan	27.1	2,729						
Labour	Andrew Burns	22.6	2,272	2,297.42	2,308.51	2,327.68	2,568.58		
SNP	Denis C Dixon	18.6	1,875	1,900.25	1,919.42	1,948.60	2,157.10	2,169.89	
Liberal Democrats	Jim Lowrie	17.1	1,725	1,799.83	1,811.09	1,843.70	2,357.16	2,387.72	3,430.41
Green	Jeni MacKay	11.2	1,123	1,146.09	1,165.35	1,215.70			
Solidarity	Anne Edmonds	1.4	142	143.64	163.90				
Scottish Socialist	Barbara J. Scott	1.0	105	106.90					
Electorate: 16,800 Valid: 9,970 Spoilt: 87 Quota: 2,493 Turnout: 59.9%
