= City of Edinburgh Council elections =

Local government elections in City of Edinburgh, Scotland

City of Edinburgh Council in Scotland holds elections every five years, previously holding them every four years from its creation as a single-tier authority in 1995 to 2007.

== Council elections ==
=== As a district council ===
Year	SNP	Labour	Liberal (Note: SDP–Liberal Alliance from 1981 to 1988, Liberal Democrats from 1988.)	Conservative	Independent
1974	1	29	3	30	1
1977	5	23	1	34	1
1980 (Note: New ward boundaries.)	2	25	2	31	2 (Note: Includes 1 Independent Labour.)
1984	2	34	4	22	0
1988	2	33	4	23	0
1992	2	30	7	23	0

=== As a unitary authority ===
Year	SNP	Labour	Liberal Democrats	Green	Conservative
1995	0	34	10	0	14
1999 (Note: New ward boundaries.)	1	31	13	0	13
2003	0	30	15	0	13
2007 (Note: Change to single transferable vote system and new ward boundaries.)	12	15	17	3	11
2012	18	20	3	6	11
2017 (Note: New ward boundaries.)	19	12	6	8	18
2022	19	13	12	10	9

== Results maps ==
1980 results map

1984 results map

1988 results map

1992 results map

1995 results map

1999 results map

2003 results map

2007 results map

2012 results map

2017 results map

2022 results map

== By-elections ==
=== 2003-2007 ===
North Morningside/Grange By-Election 9 October 2003
Party	Candidate	Votes	%	±%
Liberal Democrats	Elizabeth O'Malley	883	43.1	−15.6
Conservative		743	36.3	+17.1
Green		185	9.0	+9.0
Labour		141	6.9	−5.1
SNP		95	4.6	−2.0
Majority		140	6.8	
Turnout		2,047		
Liberal Democrats hold				

Colinton By-Election 28 October 2004
Party	Candidate	Votes	%	±%
Conservative	Jason Rust	1,830	46.0	−16.7
Liberal Democrats		1,680	42.2	+30.4
Labour		289	7.3	−8.3
SNP		145	3.6	−6.3
Scottish Socialist		38	1.0	+1.0
Majority		150	3.8	
Turnout		3,982		
Conservative hold				

Murrayfield By-Election 10 November 2005
Party	Candidate	Votes	%	±%
Conservative	Jeremy Balfour	1,327	50.0	−0.4
Liberal Democrats	Michael Crockart	859	32.4	+10.5
Independent	Kristina Woolnough	226	8.5	+8.5
Labour	Norma Hart	114	4.3	−12.0
Green	Jill Boulton	58	2.2	+2.2
SNP	Sheena Cleland	52	2.0	−5.7
Liberal	Roy Isserlis	12	0.5	+0.5
UKIP	Melville Brown	4	0.2	+0.2
Majority		468	17.6	
Turnout		2,652		
Conservative hold				

=== 2007-2012 ===
Forth By-Election 6 November 2008
Party	Candidate	FPv%	Count								
Party	Candidate	FPv%	1	2	3	4	5	6	7	8	9
Labour	Cammy Day	29.53	2,013	2,014	2,023	2,042	2,134	2,228	2,543	2,810	3,735
SNP	George Gordon	27.01	1,841	1,843	1,849	1,861	1,920	2,005	2,259	2,529	
Conservative	Iain McGill	17.31	1,180	1,184	1,187	1,188	1,199	1,225	1,453		
Liberal Democrats	Sanne C Djikstra-Downie	14.45	985	987	989	995	1,033	1,155			
Green	Kate Joester	5.06	341	343	360	373	410				
Independent	John Loughton	4.36	297	303	307	323					
Solidarity	Willie Black	1.17	80	80	84						
Scottish Socialist	Robert Richard	1.0	53	54							
Independent	James G MacLean	0.1	26								
Labour hold											
Valid: 6,816 Spoilt: 70 Quota: 3,409 Turnout: 6,886

Liberton/Gilmerton By-Election 9 September 2010
Party	Candidate	FPv%	Count						
Party	Candidate	FPv%	1	2	3	4	5	6	7
Labour	Bill Cook	44.8	2,974				3,121	3,308	
SNP	Richard Lewis	20.8	1,382				1,484	1,698	
Conservative	Stephanie Murray	15.4	1,020				1,055	1,262	
Liberal Democrats	John Christopher Knox	10.9	722				816		
Green	Peter McColl	3.0	201						
Scottish Socialist	Colin Fox	2.5	169						
Independent	Mev Brown	1.9	128						
Pirate	Philip Hunt	0.6	43						
Labour hold									
Valid: 6,639 Spoilt: 65 Quota: 3,320 Turnout: 6,704

City Centre By-Election 18 August 2011
Party	Candidate	FPv%	Count				
Party	Candidate	FPv%	1	2	3	4	5
SNP	Alasdair Rankin	23.1	797	825	893	1,081	1,368
Conservative	Iain McGill	24.2	837	904	1,043	1,110	1,264
Labour	Karen Doran	19.7	682	716	745	968	
Green	Melanie Main	14.3	494	576	635		
Independent	John Carson	11.4	394	402			
Liberal Democrats	Alistair Hodgson	7.3	251				
SNP hold							
Valid: 3,455 Spoilt: 11 Quota: 1,728 Turnout: 3,466

=== 2012-2017 ===
Liberton/Gilmerton By-Election 20 June 2013
Party	Candidate	FPv%	Count						
Party	Candidate	FPv%	1	2	3	4	5	6	7
Labour	Keith John Robson	39.5	2,892	2,896	2,906	2,941	3,070	3,255	3,448
SNP	Derek Howie	30.7	2,249	2,251	2,256	2,287	2,403	2,523	2,633
Conservative	Stephanie Murray	11.2	823	824	836	903	934	1,098	
Liberal Democrats	John Christopher Knox	8.3	605	611	616	625	708		
Green	Alys Mumford	5.6	412	430	440	471			
UKIP	Jonathan Stanley	3.2	235	239	251				
Independent	John Scott	0.9	64	70					
Pirate	Phil Hunt	0.6	47						
Labour gain from SNP									
Valid: 7,246 Spoilt: 81 Quota: 3,664 Turnout: 7,327

Leith Walk By-Election 10 September 2015
Party	Candidate	FPv%	Count									
Party	Candidate	FPv%	1	2	3	4	5	6	7	8	9	10
SNP	John Ritchie	36.2	2,290									
Labour	Marion Donaldson	25.7	1,623	1,650.1	1,653.1	1,659.6	1,661.7	1,680.4	1,697.6	1,798.2	1,990.2	2,717.3
Green	Susan Rae	21.8	1,381	1,464.6	1,469.8	1,483.4	1,495.3	1,502.7	1,576.1	1,653.3	1,729.9	
Conservative	Gordon Murdie	7.9	501	503.8	505.8	506.9	507.0	540.2	541.2	574.6		
Liberal Democrats	Mo Hussain	4.0	255	261.6	263.0	265.3	265.3	267.4	271.6			
UKIP	Alan Melville	1.6	102	105.6	105.6	106.8	106.8					
Scottish Socialist	Natalie Reid	1.5	97	107.7	107.7	108.2	122.0	125.2				
Left Unity	Bruce Whitehead	0.5	32	33.6	33.7	33.9						
Independent	John Scott	0.4	26	29.0	30.0							
Scottish Libertarian	Tom Laird	0.3	17	17.9								
SNP hold												
Labour gain from Green												
Valid: 6,324 Spoilt: 83 Quota: 2,109 Turnout: 6,407

=== 2017-2022 ===
Leith Walk By-Election 11 April 2019
Party	Candidate	FPv%	Count										
Party	Candidate	FPv%	1	2	3	4	5	6	7	8	9	10	11
SNP	Rob Munn	35.7	2,596	2,598	2,598	2,598	2,612	2,616	2,630	2,721	2,763	3,021	4,487
Green	Lorna Slater	25.5	1,855	1,856	1,856	1,856	1,865	1,869	1,904	2,093	2,223	2,765	
Labour	Nick Gardner	15.5	1,123	1,124	1,124	1,126	1,136	1,140	1,157	1,320	1,497		
Conservative	Dan McCroskrie	10.7	777	777	779	781	784	811	825	912			
Liberal Democrats	Jack Caldwell	8.6	623	624	624	626	628	633	652				
Independent	Kevin Illingworth	1.5	110	112	112	122	126	143					
UKIP	Steven Alexander	1.2	85	88	97	97	98						
Socialist Labour	David Jacobsen	0.8	56	56	56	56							
Independent	John Scott	0.2	16	16	17								
For Britain	Paul Stirling	0.2	14	14									
Scottish Libertarian	Tom Laird	0.2	12										
SNP gain from Labour													
Valid: 7,267 Spoilt: 67 Quota: 3,634 Turnout: 7,334

Craigentinny/Duddingston By-election (12 November 2020)
Party	Candidate	FPv%	Count					
Party	Candidate	FPv%	1	2	3	4	5	6
SNP	Ethan Young	38.9	2,920	2,924	2,936	3,004	3,716	3,818
Labour	Margaret Graham	16.1	1,205	1,205	1,216	1,359	1,682	2,085
Conservative	Eleanor Price	18.9	1,420	1,428	1,448	1,582	1,620	
Green	Benjamin Parker	15.8	1,185	1,189	1,203	1,340		
Liberal Democrats	Elaine Ford	8.4	631	634	647			
Independent	Andrew McDonald	1.2	93	100				
Scottish Libertarian	Tam Laird	0.6	42					
SNP hold								
Valid: 7,496 Spoilt: 86 Quota: 3,749 Turnout: 7,582

=== 2022-2027 ===
Corstorphine/Murrayfield By-Election 9 March 2023
Party	Candidate	FPv%	Count
Party	Candidate	FPv%	1
Liberal Democrats	Fiona Bennett	56.0	4,577
SNP	Donald Rutherford	13.3	1,086
Conservative	Hugh Findlay	9.6	788
Labour	Richard Parker	7.0	568
Green	Chris Young	5.1	417
Independent	Elaine Miller	3.7	327
Independent	Pete Gregson	3.6	295
Scottish Family	Richard Fettes	1.1	90
Scottish Libertarian	Gary Smith	0.2	20
Liberal Democrats gain from SNP			
Valid: 8,168 Spoilt: 57 Quota: 4,085 Turnout: 8,225

Colinton/Fairmilehead By-Election 14 November 2024
Party	Candidate	FPv%	Count										
Party	Candidate	FPv%	1	2	3	4	5	6	7	8	9	10	11
Liberal Democrats	Louise Spence	36.3	2,683	2,684	2,685	2,687	2,697	2,704	2,763	2,793	2,898	3,096	3,751
Labour	Sheila Gilmore	19.5	1,441	1,441	1,444	1,446	1,453	1,463	1,480	1,495	1,611	1,886	2,055
Conservative	Neil Cuthbert	19.6	1,454	1,458	1,458	1,465	1,476	1,483	1,517	1,638	1,643	1,676	
SNP	Marianna Clyde	10.8	800	800	800	801	806	816	826	835	963		
Green	Daniel Milligan	5.3	393	393	396	397	402	407	414	423			
Reform	Grant Lidster	3.6	268	269	269	281	283	287	300				
Independent	Marc Wilkinson	2.3	173	173	175	177	179	190					
Independent	David Henry	0.8	57	57	57	63	75						
Independent	Mev Brown	0.7	50	51	60	62							
Scottish Family	Richard Lucas	0.7	51	51	51								
Independent	Bonnie Prince Bob	0.3	22	22									
Scottish Libertarian	Tam Laird	0.1	9										
Liberal Democrats gain from Labour													
Electorate: 19,907 Valid: 7,401 Spoilt: 45 Quota: 3,701 Turnout: 7,446

Colinton/Fairmilehead By-Election 23 January 2025
Party	Candidate	FPv%	Count												
Party	Candidate	FPv%	1	2	3	4	5	6	7	8	9	10	11	12	13
Conservative	Neil Cuthbert	32.6	2,027	2,027	2,028	2,030	2,034	2,039	2,050	2,100					
Labour	Connor Savage	18.4	1,146	1,147	1,148	1,149	1,152	1,159	1,166	1,191	1,193	1,209	1,342	1,615	2,192
Liberal Democrats	Peter Nicholson	16.2	1,009	1,009	1,009	1,009	1,012	1,015	1,023	1,059	1,064	1,103	1,187	1,380	
SNP	Marianna Clyde	13.5	840	840	840	843	843	848	849	870	870	892	1,032		
Green	Daniel Milligan	6.8	426	426	426	426	432	436	444	460	460	467			
Reform	Grant Lidster	5.5	345	345	345	347	348	354	364	384	387				
Independent	Marc Wilkinson	4.1	256	256	258	260	264	278	288						
Scottish Family	Richard Lucas	1.0	65	65	68	69	70	70							
Independent	David Henry	0.6	38	38	43	54	61								
Independent	Bonnie Prince Bob	0.5	30	32	32	32									
Independent	Mev Brown	0.4	23	23	25										
Independent	Nick Horning	0.2	13	15											
Independent	Mark Ney-Party	0.1	5												
Conservative gain from SNP															
Labour gain from Liberal Democrats															
Valid: 6,223 Spoilt: 58 Quota: 2,075 Turnout: 6,281

Fountainbridge/Craiglockhart By-Election 26 June 2025
Party	Candidate	FPv%	Count												
Party	Candidate	FPv%	1	2	3	4	5	6	7	8	9	10	11	12	13
Liberal Democrats	Kevin McKay	20.4	1,269	1,270	1,270	1,276	1,279	1,285	1,288	1,321	1,364	1,480	1,867	2,316	3,409
Labour	Catriona Munro	20.8	1,293	1,293	1,295	1,297	1,304	1,307	1,314	1,335	1,368	1,502	1,668	2,219	
Green	Q Manivannan	18.2	1,133	1,135	1,136	1,136	1,138	1,157	1,166	1,175	1,187	1,595	1,636		
Conservative	Mark Hooley	13.8	857	858	861	862	865	865	868	884	1,080	1,109			
SNP	Murray Visentin	14.5	905	905	905	907	909	913	919	930	950				
Reform	Gary Neill	7.9	489	489	490	491	498	499	500	512					
Independent	Marc Wilkinson	1.8	111	111	118	119	120	124	130						
Independent	Bonnie Prince Bob	0.6	36	38	42	43	46	48							
Independent	Steve West	0.6	39	40	45	45	45								
Scottish Family	Richard Lucas	0.5	34	34	34	39									
Scottish Libertarian	Lukasz Furmaniak	0.4	25	26	26										
Independent	Mark Rowbotham	0.4	25	25											
Independent	Derrick Emms	0.1	9												
Liberal Democrats gain from Labour															
Valid: 6,264 Spoilt: 39 Quota: 3,113 Turnout: 6,303

Portobello/Craigmillar By-Election 3 September 2026
Party	Candidate	FPv%	Count									
Party	Candidate	FPv%	1	2	3	4	5	6	7	8	9	10
Green	Lorenzo Martinico	28.0	1,781	1,786	1,788	1,810	1,825	1,872	1,890	1,920	2,652	3,341
Labour	Jim Wyke	22.2	1,413	1,416	1,417	1,421	1,431	1,568	1,733	1,848	2,188	
SNP	Silas McGilvray	24.1	1,531	1,533	1,537	1,555	1,567	1,609	1,631	1,681		
Reform	Andrew McLaughlin	8.9	569	569	573	574	588	598	727			
Conservative	Haris Young	8.2	522	522	522	523	528	575				
Liberal Democrats	Liss Owen	5.7	365	365	366	372	372					
Scottish Family	Niel Deepnarain	1.1	73	74	77	80						
Workers Party	Pete Gregson	0.9	58	64	73							
ADF	David Ballantine	0.4	28	28								
Communist	Peter Olech	0.3	22									
Green gain from SNP												
Valid: 6,362 Spoilt: 65 Quota: 3,182 Turnout: 6,427

Southside/Newington By-Election 3 September 2026
Party	Candidate	FPv%	Count												
Party	Candidate	FPv%	1	2	3	4	5	6	7	8	9	10	11	12	13
Labour	Ruth Elliott	32.1	2,153	2,156	2,159	2,160	2,167	2,171	2,187	2,210	2,238	2,498	2,693	3,030	4,350
Green	Isabella Gastel Alejandre	29.5	1,978	1,978	1,978	1,979	1,982	2,007	2,020	2,037	2,043	2,119	2,486	2,505	
Conservative	Nick Layden	10.7	717	717	717	719	727	728	733	743	872	948	968		
SNP	Sam Mackenzie	11.3	757	757	757	758	759	760	766	771	787	828			
Liberal Democrats	Artie Khovanov	8.1	543	543	544	546	549	550	556	565	573				
Reform	Gary Neill	4.5	305	305	305	306	308	309	310	315					
Edinburgh and East Lothian People	Marc Wilkinson	1.2	78	81	83	84	85	88	94						
Independent	Roisin Keirdashian	0.9	63	63	63	63	65	71							
Communist	Richard Shillcock	0.7	46	46	47	48	50								
Scottish Family	Richard Lucas	0.6	38	38	38	39									
ADF	Sean Moffat	0.2	12	12	13										
Edinburgh and East Lothian People	Derrick Emms	0.1	9	9											
Edinburgh and East Lothian People	Markham Rowbotham	0.1	7												
Labour gain from SNP															
Valid: 6,706 Spoilt: 35 Quota: 3,354 Turnout: 6,741
