= 2007 City of Edinburgh Council election =

2007 Scottish local government election

- 3 May 2007

All 58 seats to Edinburgh City Council 30 seats needed for a majority
	First party	Second party	Third party
Party	Liberal Democrats	Labour	SNP
Last election	15 seats, 26.9%	30 seats, 27.4%'	0 seats, 15.6%
Seats won	17	15	12
Seat change	▲2	▼15	▲12
Popular vote	42,657	44,489	39,431
Percentage	22.0%	22.9%	20.3%
Swing	▼5.0%	▼4.5%	▲4.7%
	Fourth party	Fifth party
Party	Conservative	Green
Last election	12 seats, 24.7%	New party
Seats won	11	3
Seat change	▼1	▲3
Popular vote	42,840	15,959
Percentage	22.1%	8.2%
Swing	▼2.6%	New
- Map of council wards

Elections to the City of Edinburgh Council were held on 3 May 2007, the same day as the Scottish Parliament general election. The election was the first one using 17 new wards created as a result of the Local Governance (Scotland) Act 2004, each ward will elect three or four councillors using the single transferable vote system form of proportional representation. The new wards replace 58 single-member wards which used the plurality (first past the post) system of election.

== Aggregate results ==
2007 City of Edinburgh Council election
Party	Seats	Gains	Losses	Net gain/loss	Seats %	Votes %	Votes	+/−
Liberal Democrats	17	N/A	N/A	+2	29.31	21.99	42,657	-5.00
Labour	15	N/A	N/A	-15	25.86	22.93	44,489	-4.75
SNP	12	N/A	N/A	+12	20.69	20.32	39,431	+4.60
Conservative	11	N/A	N/A	-1	18.97	22.08	42,840	-1.91
Green	3	N/A	N/A	+3	5.17	8.23	15,959	New
Scottish Socialist	0	N/A	N/A	±0	0.00	1.07	2,077	-3.10
Solidarity	0	N/A	N/A	±0	0.00	0.85	1,651	New
Liberal	0	N/A	N/A	±0	0.00	0.63	1,221	+0.42
Independent	0	N/A	N/A	±0	0.00	1.90	3,681	+0.70

Following the election, a Liberal Democrat-SNP minority administration was formed.

== Ward summary ==
Results of the 2007 City of Edinburgh Council election by ward
Ward	%	Seats	%	Seats	%	Seats	%	Seats	%	Seats	%	Seats	Total
Ward	Lib Dem		Labour		SNP		Conservative		Green		Others		Total
Almond	36.6	1	10.7	0	18.2	1	28.1	1	4.4	0	1.2	0	3
Pentland Hills	11.4	0	19.5	1	20.3	1	41.7	1	4.3	0	2.0	0	3
Drum Brae/Gyle	44.8	2	14.8	0	18.4	1	16.1	0	3.2	0	1.6	0	3
Forth	17.9	1	29.0	1	22.7	1	20.2	1	5.8	0	4.4	0	4
Inverleith	20.2	1	18.2	1	13.3	1	27.6	1	7.5	0	11.2	0	4
Corstorphine/Murrayfield	37.7	2	15.2	0	14.9	0	25.7	1	4.8	0	2.7	0	3
Sighthill/Gorgie	10.6	1	35.3	2	30.9	1	9.6	0	5.7	0	6.0	0	4
Colinton/Fairmilehead	14.8	0	18.7	1	14.9	0	45.7	2	4.2	0	0.6	0	3
Fountainbridge/Craiglockhart	17.1	1	22.6	1	18.6	0	27.1	1	11.2	0	2.4	0	3
Meadows/Morningside	30.8	1	14.0	1	10.5	0	26.4	1	15.2	1	1.4	0	4
City Centre	19.7	1	17.9	0	20.3	1	20.1	1	16.8	0	4.4	0	3
Leith Walk	19.0	1	26.9	1	22.3	1	9.7	0	15.3	1	3.4	0	4
Leith	21.8	1	26.8	1	27.4	1	7.1	0	11.2	0	4.2	0	3
Craigentinny/Duddingston	10.0	1	34.2	1	29.2	1	14.4	0	5.9	0	5.0	0	3
Southside/Newington	31.0	1	18.6	1	13.1	0	18.5	1	14.1	1	2.7	0	4
Liberton/Gilmerton	14.2	1	34.7	2	26.0	1	14.3	0	3.5	0	5.1	0	4
Portobello/Craigmillar	08.3	1	30.8	1	28.0	1	11.0	0	6.7	0	13.2	0	3
Total	22.0	17	22.9	15	20.3	12	22.1	11	8.2	3	4.5	0	58

== Ward results ==
=== Almond ===
2007 Council election: Almond (3 seats)
Party	Candidate	FPv%	Count						
Party	Candidate	FPv%	1	2	3	4	5	6	7
Conservative	Kate Mackenzie	28.1	3,352						
Liberal Democrats	George Grubb	23.6	2,809	2,864.78	2,884.14	3,076.36			
SNP	Norman Work	18.2	2,164	2,193.84	2,219.08	2,325.21	2,341.37	2,568.21	3,300.77
Liberal Democrats	Neil MacLean	13.0	1,548	1,654.82	1,664.94	1,761.03	1,823.11	2,351.21	
Labour	John Longstaff	10.7	1,280	1,298.24	1,317.36	1,382.61	1,399.23		
Green	Jill Boulton	4.4	520	548.42	586.54				
Scottish Socialist	Ross Clark	1.2	144	145.42					
Electorate: 18,779 Valid: 11,817 Spoilt: 104 Quota: 2,955 Turnout: 62.93%

=== Pentland Hills ===
2007 Council election: Pentland Hills (3 seats)
Party	Candidate	FPv%	Count					
Party	Candidate	FPv%	1	2	3	4	5	6
Conservative	Alastair S Paisley	22.9	2,523	2,532	2,536	2,565	2,718	4,401
SNP	Ronald Cairns	20.3	2,238	2,247	2,274	2,374	2,661	2,789
Labour	Ricky Henderson	19.5	2,148	2,161	2,181	2,263	2,663	2,798
Conservative	Andy MacIver	18.8	2,074	2,081	2,084	2,113	2,285	
Liberal Democrats	Iain J Coleman	11.4	1,255	1,281	1,299	1,471		
Green	Shonagh McEwan	4.3	479	488	518			
Scottish Socialist	Alister H Black	1.1	116	117				
Liberal	Irvine McMinn	0.9	94					
Electorate: 17,390 Valid: 10,927 Spoilt: 104 Quota: 2,732 Turnout: 62.83%

=== Drum Brae/Gyle ===
2007 Council election: Drum Brae/Gyle (3 seats)
Party	Candidate	FPv%	Count							
Party	Candidate	FPv%	1	2	3	4	5	6	7	8
Liberal Democrats	Robert Aldridge	25.2	2,630							
Liberal Democrats	Jenny Dawe	19.6	2,049	2,078.99	2,100.27	2,113.31	2,234.21	2,702.55		
SNP	Colin G Keir	18.4	1,917	1,920.20	1,939.32	1,956.32	2,018.71	2,263.43	2,287.23	2,725.43
Conservative	Steven Binney	16.1	1,676	1,679.60	1,684.67	1,687.67	1,716.86	1,865.21	1,889.87	
Labour	Cameron Day	14.8	1,545	1,549.01	1,559.12	1,576.19	1,631.28			
Green	Fiona A Paterson	3.2	330	331.94	337.99	361.09				
Scottish Socialist	Iain Pendreich	0.8	88	88.24	89.26					
Liberal	Roy Isserlis	0.8	85	85.84						
Electorate: 17,364 Valid: 10,320 Spoilt: 113 Quota: 2,581 Turnout: 60.1%

=== Forth ===
2007 Council election: Forth (4 seats)
Party	Candidate	FPv%	Count								
Party	Candidate	FPv%	1	2	3	4	5	6	7	8	9
SNP	Steve Cardownie	22.67	2,472								
Conservative	Allan Jackson	20.23	2,206								
Liberal Democrats	Elaine P Morris†	17.91	1,953	2,000.44	2,008.23	2,020.41	2,059.83	2,094.96	2,436.61		
Labour	Elizabeth Maginnis	14.82	1,616	1,640.13	1,642.50	1,650.86	1,676.12	1,694.00	1,795.54	1,856.72	3,100.78
Labour	Billy Fitzpatrick	14.19	1,547	1,581.61	1,582.56	1,588.91	1,612.69	1,672.18	1,755.67	1,797.68	
Green	Kate Joester	5.75	627	670.55	672.98	698.89	744.24	822.04			
Independent	Fred Marinello	1.84	201	217.44	218.71	225.06					
Solidarity	Willie Black	1.81	197	227.49	227.70	246.67	270.03				
Scottish Socialist	Marilyn Sangster	0.77	84	92.95	93.03						
Electorate: 20,744 Valid: 10,903 Spoilt: 180 Quota: 2,181 Turnout: 53.4%

=== Inverleith ===
2007 Council election: Inverleith (4 seats)
Party	Candidate	FPv%	Count										
Party	Candidate	FPv%	1	2	3	4	5	6	7	8	9	10	11
Labour	Lesley A Hinds	18.2	2,689	2,706	2,714	2,724	2,743	2,904	3,025				
Conservative	Lindsay Paterson	14.1	2,085	2,087	2,089	2,102	2,114	2,166	2,284	2,288.52	2,411.12	2,449.96	
Conservative	Iain Whyte	13.5	1,986	1,986	1,988	1,999	1,999	2,022	2,346	2,349.91	2,465.52	2,498.29	4,277.64
SNP	Stuart McIvor	13.3	1,961	1,970	1,990	2,010	2,036	2,239	2,406	2,418.74	2,563.85	2,614.11	2,729.02
Liberal Democrats	Tim McKay	11.1	1,644	1,648	1,656	1,666	1,710	2,020	2,223	2,246.26	3,269.54		
Liberal Democrats	Tom Ponton	9.1	1,339	1,340	1,347	1,355	1,376	1,529	1,744	1,755.80			
Independent	Kristina Woolnough	9.0	1,323	1,324	1,329	1,364	1,367	1,449					
Green	Melanie A M Main	7.5	1,113	1,135	1,165	1,177	1,192						
Liberal	Seumas MacMhicean	1.0	148	151	151	162							
Independent	John Y Anderson	0.9	129	131	134								
Solidarity	Raymond Watt	0.7	103	117									
Scottish Socialist	Sean H Donnelly	0.6	92										
Electorate: 22,903 Valid: 14,612 Spoilt: 138 Quota: 2,923 Turnout: 64.4%

=== Corstorphine/Murrayfield ===
2007 Council election: Corstorphine/Murrayfield (3 seats)
Party	Candidate	FPv%	Count						
Party	Candidate	FPv%	1	2	3	4	5	6	7
Conservative	Jeremy Balfour	25.7	2,972						
Liberal Democrats	Paul Edie	21.1	2,444	2,474.88	2,481.88	2,633.48	3,046.01		
Liberal Democrats	Phil Wheeler	16.6	1,915	1,927.83	1,936.87	2,054.48	2,459.35	2,578.54	3,536.57
Labour	Daniel Donaldson	15.2	1,757	1,762.90	1,773.90	1,863.38	2,136.86	2,164.33	
SNP	Robin J A MacCormick	14.9	1,727	1,734.77	1,750.92	1,852.76			
Green	Charles Kennedy	4.8	556	565.68	582.75				
Scottish Socialist	Andrew Weir	0.7	80	80.29					
Electorate: 17,531 Valid: 11,451 Spoilt: 119 Quota: 2,863 Turnout: 66.0%

=== Sighthill/Gorgie ===
2007 Council election: Sighthill/Gorgie (4 seats)
Party	Candidate	FPv%	Count								
Party	Candidate	FPv%	1	2	3	4	5	6	7	8	9
SNP	Nick Elliott-Canon	30.9	3,785								
Labour	Eric Milligan	26.0	3,185								
Liberal Democrats	Joanna Toomey	10.6	1,300	1,510.76	1,562.88	1,581.62	1,612.21	1,649.38	1,713.14	2,158.92	2,618.40
Conservative	Iain G Gibson	9.6	1,180	1,257.57	1,271.31	1,285.52	1,296.09	1,341.93	1,358.27	1,432.83	
Labour	Donald C Wilson	9.3	1,142	1,270.43	1,718.61	1,746.99	1,769.54	1,810.64	1,877.65	2,027.13	2,158.60
Green	James N G Mackenzie	5.7	702	891.91	919.34	941.22	1,007.12	1,063.20	1,172.87		
Solidarity	Jason J Mangan	1.9	238	349.60	362.97	368.67	431.73	463.41			
Independent	Keith J Bell	1.7	209	289.50	300.63	334.49	347.87				
Scottish Socialist	Gerry Corbett	1.4	168	249.96	263.70	267.17					
Independent	Tam Smith	1.0	127	156.27	164.33						
Electorate: 24,717 Valid: 11,996 Spoilt: 236 Quota: 2,400 Turnout: 49.5%

=== Colinton/Fairmilehead ===
2007 Council election: Colinton/Fairmilehead (3 seats)
Party	Candidate	FPv%	Count					
Party	Candidate	FPv%	1	2	3	4	5	6
Conservative	Elaine Aitken	23.1	2,877	2,878	2,907	3,111		
Conservative	Jason Rust	22.6	2,815	2,816	2,844	2,994	3,012.70	3,595.21
Labour	Eric Barry	18.7	2,332	2,41	2,442	2,758	2,760.15	3,639.03
SNP	Thomas Kielty	14.9	1,861	1,881	1,983			
Liberal Democrats	Stuart Bridges	14.8	1,842	1,845	2,020	2,589	2,593.21	
Green	Alastair J Tibbitt	4.2	517	546				
Scottish Socialist	Robert Mathie	0.6	80					
Electorate: 18,413 Valid: 12,324 Spoilt: 132 Quota: 3,082 Turnout: 67.6%

=== Fountainbridge/Craiglockhart ===
2007 Council election: Fountainbridge/Craiglockhart (3 seats)
Party	Candidate	FPv%	Count						
Party	Candidate	FPv%	1	2	3	4	5	6	7
Conservative	Gordon Buchan	27.1	2,729						
Labour	Andrew Burns	22.6	2,272	2,297.42	2,308.51	2,327.68	2,568.58		
SNP	Denis C Dixon	18.6	1,875	1,900.25	1,919.42	1,948.60	2,157.10	2,169.89	
Liberal Democrats	Jim Lowrie	17.1	1,725	1,799.83	1,811.09	1,843.70	2,357.16	2,387.72	3,430.41
Green	Jeni MacKay	11.2	1,123	1,146.09	1,165.35	1,215.70			
Solidarity	Anne Edmonds	1.4	142	143.64	163.90				
Scottish Socialist	Barbara J Scott	1.0	105	106.90					
Electorate: 16,800 Valid: 9,970 Spoilt: 87 Quota: 2,493 Turnout: 59.9%

=== Meadows/Morningside ===
2007 Council election: Meadows/Morningside (4 seats)
Party	Candidate	FPv%	Count								
Party	Candidate	FPv%	1	2	3	4	5	6	7	8	9
Conservative	Mark McInnes	26.4	3,844								
Liberal Democrats	Marilyne Angela MacLaren	19.3	2,817	3,021.25							
Green	Alison Johnstone	15.2	2,209	2,309.16	2,329.46	2,353.12	2,386.31	2,477.31	3,070.46		
Labour	Paul Godzik	14.0	2,043	2,108.95	2,122.35	2,126.64	2,142.19	2,168.09	2,358.63	2,396.23	3,103.04
Liberal Democrats	Sue Tritton	11.5	1,683	1,811.71	1,879.14	1,889.71	1,927.65	1,937.82	2,235.48	2,301.73	
SNP	Richard Lewis	10.5	1,529	1,584.86	1,592.03	1,609.31	1,624.52	1,649.46			
Scottish Socialist	Helga Janzen	0.9	137	139.71	140.51	179.76	184.00				
Solidarity	Pat Smith	0.8	122	125.94	126.40						
Independent	Duncan Thorp	0.7	105	151.76	152.93	157.98					
Electorate: 23,263 Valid: 14,489 Spoilt: 83 Quota: 2,898 Turnout: 62.6%

=== City Centre ===
2007 Council election: City Centre (3 seats)
Party	Candidate	FPv%	Count							
Party	Candidate	FPv%	1	2	3	4	5	6	7	8
SNP	David Beckett	20.3	1,630	1,644	1,661	1,688	1,983	2,027.02		
Conservative	Joanna Mowat	20.1	1,614	1,628	1,665	1,670	1,742	1,783.63	1,788.75	2,221.13
Liberal Democrats	Charles C Dundas	19.7	1,587	1,605	1,627	1,637	2,225			
Labour	Bill Cunningham	17.9	1,437	1,446	1,454	1,468	1,705	1,774.35	1,782.67	
Green	Gavin N Corbett	16.8	1,352	1,363	1,384	1,450				
Scottish Socialist	Catriona Grant	1.8	142	143	146					
Independent	Brian R Ferrier	1.6	130	133						
Liberal	Karen M Hetherington	1.0	83							
Electorate: 15,829 Valid: 7,975 Spoilt: 73 Quota: 1,994 Turnout: 50.8%

=== Leith Walk ===
2007 Council election: Leith Walk (4 seats)
Party	Candidate	FPv%	Count									
Party	Candidate	FPv%	1	2	3	4	5	6	7	8	9	10
SNP	Deidre Brock	22.3	2,550									
Liberal Democrats	Louise A Lang	19.0	2,170	2,217.17	2,217.29	2,240.22	2,291.06					
Labour	Angela Blacklock	16.9	1,937	1,965.54	1,966.54	1,975.35	1,997.40	2,003.09	2,041.43	2,173.28	2,215.25	3,161.41
Green	Maggie Chapman	15.3	1,754	1,824.81	1,829.81	1,911.26	1,953.36	1,967.18	2,103.10	2,424.74		
Labour	Trevor Davies	10.0	1,144	1,156.81	1,156.81	1,165.28	1,180.09	1,183.88	1,196.35	1,312.35	1,333.29	
Conservative	Iain McGill	9.7	1,114	1,129.49	1,133.61	1,133.96	1,149.24	1,154.49	1,162.67			
Solidarity	Adrian Cannon	1.8	203	228.16	230.27	273.069	283.23	284.33				
Liberal	John Hein	1.7	193	207.33	207.44	211.02						
Scottish Socialist	Linda Somerville	1.6	182	192.95	193.06							
Independent	Peter Clifford	0.1	16	16.58								
Electorate: 21,485 Valid: 11,263 Spoilt: 188 Quota: 2,253 Turnout: 53.3%

=== Leith ===
2007 Council election: Leith (3 seats)
Party	Candidate	FPv%	Count						
Party	Candidate	FPv%	1	2	3	4	5	6	7
SNP	Rob Munn	27.4	2,333						
Liberal Democrats	Marjorie Thomas	21.8	1,854	1,891.37	1,912.39	1,976.82	2,191.85		
Labour	Gordon Munro	18.1	1,544	1,569.18	1,586.49	1,617.60	1,694.31	1,705.06	2,243.18
Green	Chas Booth	11.2	957	1,010.38	1,090.54	1,132.27	1,205.39	1,238.08	1,325.58
Labour	Matthew Wilson	8.7	741	751.27	763.58	778.09	801.59	818.81	
Conservative	Andrew Robertson	7.1	604	614.37	616.18	632.39			
Liberal	Joseph Hill	2.4	208	224.62	234.93				
Scottish Socialist	Grzegorz J Rybak	1.8	150	169.14					
Electorate: 16,178 Valid: 8,391 Spoilt: 124 Quota: 2,098 Turnout: 52.6%

=== Craigentinny/Duddingston ===
2007 Council election: Craigentinny/Duddingston (3 seats)
Party	Candidate	FPv%	Count										
Party	Candidate	FPv%	1	2	3	4	5	6	7	8	9	10	11
Labour	Ewan Aitken	29.2	3,487										
SNP	Stefan Tymkewycz	29.2	3,484										
Conservative	Victoria Roberts	14.4	1,720	1,741.18	1,787.05	1,793.61	1,795.76	1,809.50	1,828.19	1,843.14	1,899.42	1,966.96	
Liberal Democrats	Gary J Peacock	10.0	1,190	1,228.77	1,308.59	1,318.99	1,323.01	1,341.42	1,413.95	1,447.78	1,607.02	2,087.98	2,706.74
Green	Stan Blackley	5.9	701	741.64	819.14	824.00	854.96	884.39	913.46	1,012.66	1,184.22		
Labour	Shami Khan	5.0	600	881.07	922.61	938.21	938.21	948.23	963.96	989.98			
Solidarity	Kevin Connor	1.6	187	203.66	242.56	246.81	272.77	279.48	294.89				
Liberal	Peter McDougall	1.3	152	163.06	192.81	196.90	202.46	215.01					
Independent	Jet Cameron	0.8	100	107.63	118.63	149.00	152.24						
Scottish Socialist	Nick Eardley	0.7	82	89.79	105.59	107.06							
Independent	John Wallace	0.6	69	75.23	89.95								
Electorate: 19,693 Valid: 11,772 Spoilt: 169 Quota: 2,944 Turnout: 60.6%

=== Southside/Newington ===
2007 Council election: Southside/Newington (4 seats)
Party	Candidate	FPv%	Count							
Party	Candidate	FPv%	1	2	3	4	5	6	7	8
Labour	Ian Perry	18.6	2,530	2,537	2,548	2,554	2,568	2,763		
Conservative	Cameron Rose	18.5	2,516	2,529	2,531	2,546	2,551	2,686	2,691.32	2,835.77
Liberal Democrats	Gordon Mackenzie	17.0	2,304	2,309	2,315	2,356	2,378	2,670	2,681.66	4,168.10
Green	Steve Burgess	14.1	1,920	1,935	1,961	1,974	2,062	2,610	2,623.58	2,893.41
Liberal Democrats	Liz O' Malley	14.0	1,907	1,913	1,917	1,939	1,945	2,087	2,097.96	
SNP	Susanna Lacey	13.1	1,780	1,790	1,824	1,845	1,876			
Scottish Socialist	Scott Simpson	1.1	146	150	183	189				
Liberal	Margaret Lea	1.1	144	148	156					
Solidarity	James C Allinson	1.0	140	142						
Independent	George E Pitcher	0.6	81							
Electorate: 23,620 Valid: 13,468 Spoilt: 121 Quota: 2,694 Turnout: 57.5%

=== Liberton/Gilmerton ===
2007 Council election: Liberton/Gilmerton (4 seats)
Party	Candidate	FPv%	Count								
Party	Candidate	FPv%	1	2	3	4	5	6	7	8	9
SNP	Tom Buchanan	26.0	3,471								
Labour	Norma M Hart	18.9	2,524	2,610.82							
Labour	Ian Murray	15.8	2,104	2,142.45	2,143.08	2,156.82	2,176.04	2,207.78	2,252.96	2,356.10	2,569.78
Conservative	Gavin Easton	14.3	1,912	1,976.74	1,976.76	1,985.00	1,991.48	2,017.96	2,032.43	2,101.05	
Liberal Democrats	Conor Snowden	14.2	1,902	2,028.26	2,028.29	2,049.51	2,068.47	2,113.43	2,161.85	2,449.48	3,179.72
Green	Joan E Carter	3.5	464	589.02	589.04	605.50	639.44	639.44	788.50		
Scottish Socialist	Colin A Fox	1.6	208	265.30	265.31	268.05	310.22	330.45			
Independent	Max Volino	1.6	207	225.60	225.61	276.49	302.45				
Solidarity	John Wight	1.0	132	180.62	180.62	194.10					
Independent	Alex Scott	0.9	123	161.94	161.95						
Electorate: 24,133 Valid: 13,047 Spoilt: 306 Quota: 2,610 Turnout: 55.3%

=== Portobello/Craigmillar ===
2007 Council election: Portobello/Craigmillar (3 seats)
Party	Candidate	FPv%	Count													
Party	Candidate	FPv%	1	2	3	4	5	6	7	8	9	10	11	12	13	14
SNP	Michael A Bridgeman	28.0	3,471													
Labour	Maureen Child	21.9	2,076	2,125.94	2,125.94	2127.94	2,138.44	2,158.45	2,189.70	2,227.08	2,295.83	2,337.97				
Conservative	Alison Miller	11.0	1,041	1,057.31	1,058.69	1,058.69	1,061.44	1,068.82	1,072.45	1,089.45	1,102.83	1,156.59	1,157.08	1,202.78	1,262.92	
Labour	Lawrence Marshall	8.9	849	857.91	857.91	858.91	862.28	867.79	880.42	900.42	935.80	958.30	967.58	1,100.53		
Liberal Democrats	Stephen I Hawkins	8.3	791	817.98	817.98	817.98	820.98	857.87	875.25	910.76	923.76	1,006.27	1,007.97	1,290.09	1,481.76	1,850.76
Green	Peter McColl	6.7	635	668.63	668.63	668.63	693.01	701.89	762.80	803.30	827.56	885.08	886.40			
Independent	Norrie Davies	3.2	302	316.30	316.43	317.81	320.18	325.68	342.81	367.32						
Independent	Archie Burns	3.1	291	306.56	307.93	310.19	311.31	315.94	332.70	376.83	415.09					
Independent	Margaret Munro	2.6	244	251.40	251.65	257.78	260.41	262.91	268.41							
Solidarity	Caroline J Hosking	2.0	187	214.35	214.73	214.85	231.61	238.62								
Liberal	Massimo Circi	1.2	114	131.94	131.94	131.94	133.07									
Scottish Socialist	Jan Moran	0.8	73	81.91	82.03	82.03										
Independent	John Smart	0.2	19	20.13	20.13											
Independent	Gerry Kerr	0.1	5	7.001												
Electorate: 17,404 Valid: 9,281 Spoilt: 206 Quota: 2,321 Turnout: 54.5%

== 2007-2012 by-elections ==
A by-election arose following the death of Labour Cllr Elizabeth Maginnis on 7 September 2008. The seat was held by Labour's Cammy Day

Forth By-Election (6 November 2008) – 1 seat
Party	Candidate	FPv%	Count								
Party	Candidate	FPv%	1	2	3	4	5	6	7	8	9
Labour	Cammy Day	29.53	2,013	2,014	2,023	2,042	2,134	2,228	2,543	2,810	3,735
SNP	George Gordon	27.01	1,841	1,843	1,849	1,861	1,920	2,005	2,259	2,529	
Conservative	Iain McGill	17.31	1,180	1,184	1,187	1,188	1,199	1,225	1,453		
Liberal Democrats	Sanne C Djikstra-Downie	14.45	985	987	989	995	1,033	1,155			
Green	Kate Joester	5.06	341	343	360	373	410				
Independent	John Loughton	4.36	297	303	307	323					
Solidarity	Willie Black	1.17	80	80	84						
Scottish Socialist	Robert Richard	1.0	53	54							
Independent	James G MacLean	0.05	26								
Labour hold		Swing									
Electorate: 21,560 Valid: 6,816 Spoilt: 70 Quota: 3,409 Turnout: 6,886

A by-election arose following the resignation of Ian Murray after his election as an MP on 6 May 2010. The seat was held by Labour's Bill Cook on 9 September 2010.

Liberton/Gilmerton By-Election (9 September 2010) – 1 seat
Party	Candidate	FPv%	Count		
Party	Candidate	FPv%	1	2	3
Labour	Bill Cook	44.8	2,974	3,121	3,308
SNP	Richard Lewis	20.8	1,382	1,484	1,698
Conservative	Stephanie Murray	15.4	1,020	1,055	1,262
Liberal Democrats	John Christopher Knox	10.9	722	816	
Green	Peter McColl	3.0	201		
Scottish Socialist	Colin Fox	2.5	169		
Independent	Mev Brown	1.9	128		
Pirate	Philip Hunt	0.6	43		
Labour hold		Swing			
Electorate: 23,912 Valid: 6,639 Spoilt: 65 Quota: 3,320 Turnout: 6,704

A by-election arose following the resignation of SNP Cllr David Beckett on 9 June 2011. The seat was held by the SNP's Alasdair Rankin on 18 August 2011.

City Centre By-Election (18 August 2011) – 1 seat
Party	Candidate	FPv%	Count				
Party	Candidate	FPv%	1	2	3	4	5
Conservative	Iain McGill	24.2	837	904	1,043	1,110	1,264
SNP	Alasdair Rankin	23.1	797	825	893	1,081	1,368
Labour	Karen Doran	19.7	682	716	745	968	
Green	Melanie Main	14.3	494	576	635		
Independent	John Carson	11.4	394	402			
Liberal Democrats	Alistair Hodgson	7.3	251				
SNP hold		Swing					
Electorate: 14,810 Valid: 3,455 Spoilt: 11 Quota: 1,728 Turnout: 3,466

== Changes since 2007 Election ==
- †Forth Cllr Elaine Morris defected from the Liberal Democrats to the Scottish National Party on 21 July 2011.

== See also ==
- 2012 City of Edinburgh Council election
