= Craigentinny/Duddingston (ward) =

Electoral ward of Edinburgh, Scotland

Location of the ward

Craigentinny/Duddingston is one of the seventeen wards used to elect members of the City of Edinburgh Council. Established in 2007 along with the other wards, it currently elects four Councillors.

The ward's territory lies to the east of the city centre, with the Firth of Forth providing its eastern boundary and Holyrood Park occupying most of its western half. As its name suggests, it covers the communities of Craigentinny and Duddingston, as well as Jock's Lodge, Lochend, Meadowbank, Meadowfield, Mountcastle, Northfield, Piershill, Restalrig and Willowbrae. Originally returning three members, a minor boundary change in 2017 saw the loss of Abbeyhill, Dumbiedykes and Durham neighbourhoods to three other adjoining wards; however the population increased slightly due to the addition of streets south of Restalrig Railway Path (including two tower blocks) and housebuilding in other areas, and due to this an additional councillor was allocated. In 2019, the ward had a population of 29,927.

== Councillors ==
Election	Councillors			
2007	Gary J Peacock (Liberal Democrats)	Stefan Tymkewycz (SNP)	Ewan Aitken (Labour)	3 seats
2012	Alex Lunn (Labour)	Stefan Tymkewycz (SNP)	Joan Griffiths (Labour)	3 seats
2017	Alex Staniforth (Greens)	Ian Campbell (SNP)	Joan Griffiths (Labour)	John McLellan (Conservative)
2020	Alex Staniforth (Greens)	Ethan Young (SNP)	Joan Griffiths (Labour)	John McLellan (Conservative)
2022	Alex Staniforth (Greens)	Danny Aston (SNP)	Joan Griffiths (Labour)	Ian Whyte (Conservative)

== Election results ==
=== 2022 election ===
Craigentinny/Duddingston - 4 seats
Party	Candidate	FPv%	Count					
Party	Candidate	FPv%	1	2	3	4	5	6
Labour	Joan Griffiths (incumbent)	20.6	2,136					
SNP	Danny Aston	20.6	2,129					
Conservative	Ian Whyte (Note: Sitting councillor for Inverleith.)	19.4	2,011	2,020	2,020	2,199		
Scottish Green	Alex Staniforth (incumbent)	16.5	1,706	1,719	1,723	1,938	1,956	3,286
SNP	Shelly-Ann Brown	16.2	1,674	1,682	1,732	1,833	1,838	
Liberal Democrats	Elaine Ruth Ford	6.7	697	716	717			
Electorate: 23,924 Valid: 10,353 Spoilt: 215 Quota: 2,071 Turnout: 44.2%

=== 2020 by-election ===
On 21 February 2020, SNP councillor Ian Campbell stood down for health reasons. A by-election was held on 12 November 2020 and was won by the SNP's Ethan Young.

Craigentinny/Dunningston By-election (12 November 2020)
Party	Candidate	FPv%	Count					
Party	Candidate	FPv%	1	2	3	4	5	6
SNP	Ethan Young	38.9	2,920	2,924	2,936	3,004	3,716	3,818
Conservative	Eleanor Price	18.9	1,420	1,428	1,448	1,582	1,620	
Labour	Margaret Graham	16.1	1,205	1,205	1,216	1,359	1,682	2,085
Scottish Green	Benjamin Parker	15.8	1,185	1,189	1,203	1,340		
Liberal Democrats	Elaine Ford	8.4	631	634	647			
Independent	Andrew McDonald	1.2	93	100				
Scottish Libertarian	Tam Laird	0.6	42					
Electorate: 23,972 Valid: 7,496 Spoilt: 86 Quota: 3,749 Turnout: 31.6

=== 2017 election ===
2017 City of Edinburgh Council election

Craigentinny/Duddingston - 4 seats
Party	Candidate	FPv%	Count							
Party	Candidate	FPv%	1	2	3	4	5	6	7	8
Conservative	John McLellan	23.7	2,521							
SNP	Ian Campbell	23.1	2,458							
Labour Co-op	Joan Griffiths (incumbent)	17.4	1,845	1,910.2	1,928.9	2,095.5	2,124.2	2,727.4		
Scottish Green	Alex Staniforth	11.7	1,244	1,266.8	1,286.6	1,427.3	1,579.3	1,623.6	1,785.8	2,656.4
SNP	Alex Lunn (incumbent)	7.6	813	819.4	1,049.4	1,076.3	1,602.6	1,615.5	1,675.8	
SNP	Mridul Wadhwa	6.3	674	676.8	716.8	731.4				
Labour Co-op	Lyndsay Martin	5.9	627	660.6	665.6	740.5	747.2			
Liberal Democrats	Patrick Hadfield	4.2	448	548.6	554.9					
Electorate: 22,793 Valid: 10,630 Spoilt: 262 Quota: 2,127 Turnout: 10,892

=== 2012 election ===
2012 City of Edinburgh Council election

Craigentinny/Duddingston - 3 seats
Party	Candidate	FPv%	Count							
Party	Candidate	FPv%	1	2	3	4	5	6	7	8
SNP	Stefan Tymkewycz (incumbent)	25.8%	2180							
Labour	Joan Griffiths	25.7%	2174							
SNP	Colin Williamson	11.1%	937	989	991	1008	1138	1260	1354	
Labour	Alex Lunn	10.5%	886	887	935	954	1080	1261	1430	1740
Conservative	Jason Lingiah	10.2%	866	867	868	877	911	1080		
Liberal Democrats	Gary Peacock (incumbent)	8.0%	673	675	677	688	836			
Scottish Green	John Palmer	7.0%	590	592	594	661				
TUSC	Kevin Furguson	1.8%	150	150	151					
Electorate: 18,871 Valid: 8,456 Spoilt: 212 Quota: 2115 Turnout: 45.9%

- Labour councillor Alex Dunn defected from the Labour Party and joined the SNP on 4 December 2013.

=== 2007 election ===
2007 City of Edinburgh Council election

2007 Council election: Craigentinny/Duddingston
Party	Candidate	FPv%	Count										
Party	Candidate	FPv%	1	2	3	4	5	6	7	8	9	10	11
Labour	Ewan Aitken	29.2	3,487										
SNP	Stefan Tymkewycz	29.2	3,484										
Conservative	Victoria Roberts	14.4	1,720	1,741.18	1,787.05	1,793.61	1,795.76	1,809.50	1,828.19	1,843.14	1,899.42	1,966.96	
Liberal Democrats	Gary J Peacock	10.0	1,190	1,228.77	1,308.59	1,318.99	1,323.01	1,341.42	1,413.95	1,447.78	1,607.02	2,087.98	2,706.74
Scottish Green	Stan Blackley	5.9	701	741.64	819.14	824.00	854.96	884.39	913.46	1,012.66	1,184.22		
Labour	Shami Khan	5.0	600	881.07	922.61	938.21	938.21	948.23	963.96	989.98			
Solidarity	Kevin Connor	1.6	187	203.66	242.56	246.81	272.77	279.48	294.89				
Liberal	Peter McDougall	1.3	152	163.06	192.81	196.90	202.46	215.01					
Independent	Jet Cameron	0.8	100	107.63	118.63	149.00	152.24						
Scottish Socialist	Nick Eardley	0.7	82	89.79	105.59	107.06							
Independent	John Wallace	0.6	69	75.23	89.95								
Electorate: 19,693 Valid: 11,772 Spoilt: 169 Quota: 2,944 Turnout: 60.6%
