= Sighthill/Gorgie (ward) =

Electoral ward in Edinburgh, Scotland

Location of the ward within Edinburgh

Sighthill/Gorgie is one of the seventeen wards used to elect members of the City of Edinburgh Council, established in 2007 along with the other wards. Its territory comprises a corridor of land in the west of the city with a northern boundary formed by the railway lines between the Haymarket and Edinburgh Park stations, encompassing the Broomhouse, Dalry, Gorgie, Longstone, Parkhead, Saughton, Sighthill and Stenhouse neighbourhoods. It elects four Councillors (a minor boundary change in 2017 caused the loss of the Calders neighbourhood and the northern parts of Wester Hailes, with a small decrease in population but no change to the number of councillors). In 2019, the ward had a population of 33,826.

== Councillors ==
Election	Councillors			
2007	Joanna Toomey (Liberal Democrats)	Nick Elliott-Canon (SNP)	Donald C Wilson (Labour)	Eric Milligan (Labour)
2012	Catherine Fullerton (SNP)	Denis Dixon (SNP)	Donald C Wilson (Labour)	Eric Milligan (Labour)
2017	Catherine Fullerton (SNP)	Denis Dixon (SNP)	Donald C Wilson (Labour)	Ashley Graczyk (Conservative)
2022	Catherine Fullerton (SNP)	Denis Dixon (SNP)	Ross McKenzie (Labour)	Dan Heap (Green)

== Election results ==
=== 2022 election ===
Sighthill/Gorgie - 4 seats
Party	Candidate	FPv%	Count							
Party	Candidate	FPv%	1	2	3	4	5	6	7	8
Labour	Ross McKenzie (Note: Cllr McKenzie resigned from the Labour group in February 2023.)	23.0	1,929							
SNP	Catherine Fullerton (incumbent)	18.7	1,567	1,588	1,618	1,649	1,814			
SNP	Denis Dixon (incumbent)	17.5	1,462	1,480	1,514	1,530	1,592	1,701		
Scottish Green	Dan Heap	13.3	1,116	1,151	1,169	1,258	1,520	1,532	1,544	1,762
Conservative	Mark Hooley	11.8	986	1,011	1,023	1,131	1,285	1,286	1,287	
Independent	Ashley Graczyk (incumbent)	9.5	797	820	857	935				
Liberal Democrats	Devin Scobie	4.2	354	421	439					
Alba	David Henry	2.0	164	170						
Electorate: 23,850 Valid: 8,375 Spoilt: 182 Quota: 1,676 Turnout: 35.9%

=== 2017 election ===
2017 City of Edinburgh Council election

Sighthill/Gorgie - 4 seats
Party	Candidate	FPv%	Count						
Party	Candidate	FPv%	1	2	3	4	5	6	7
SNP	Catherine Fullerton (incumbent)	18.5%	1,574	1,575	1,582	1,888			
Conservative	Ashley Graczyk	19.09%	1,621	1,625	1,694	1,701			
Labour	Donald Wilson (incumbent)	11.69%	993	995	1,048	1,063	1,071.4	1,071.7	1,821.9
SNP	Denis Dixon (incumbent)	14.01%	1,190	1,191	1,204	1,452	1,596.7	1,596.8	1,621.8
Scottish Green	Dan Heap	14.9%	1,264	1,269	1,356	1,405	1,421.3	1,421.6	1,471.4
Labour	Carmel Smith	9.94%	844	845	902	909	914	914.5	
SNP	Simon Hayter	7.63%	648	648	653				
Liberal Democrats	Devin Scott Scobie	3.91%	332	338					
Scottish Libertarian	Calum Strange	0.32%	27						
Electorate: 21,885 Valid: 8,493 Spoilt: 219 Quota: 1,699 Turnout: 8,712 (39.8%)

On 4 July 2018, Conservative councillor Ashley Graczyk resigned from the party and became an Independent, saying the UK government's policies on disability issues and social justice were "incompatible with my beliefs and conscience".

=== 2012 election ===
2012 City of Edinburgh Council election

Sighthill/Gorgie - 4 seats
Party	Candidate	FPv%	Count					
Party	Candidate	FPv%	1	2	3	4	5	6
Labour	Eric Milligan (incumbent)	28.3	2,266					
SNP	Catherine Fullerton	20.3	1,624					
SNP	Denis Dixon	17.1	1,368	1,389	1,396	1,414	1,462	1,688
Labour	Donald Wilson (incumbent)	13.8	1,107	1,677				
Conservative	Susan Dewhurst	9.2	736	745	749	750	808	917
Scottish Green	Lindsay Ashford	8.2	658	674	690	691	776	
Liberal Democrats	Neil MacLean	3.2	253	260	267	267		
Electorate: 23,877 Valid: 8,012 Spoilt: 240 (2.91%) Quota: 1,603 Turnout: 8,252 (34.6%)

=== 2007 election ===
2007 City of Edinburgh Council election

2007 Council election: Sighthill/Gorgie
Party	Candidate	FPv%	Count								
Party	Candidate	FPv%	1	2	3	4	5	6	7	8	9
SNP	Nick Elliott-Canon	30.9	3,785								
Labour	Eric Milligan	26.0	3,185								
Liberal Democrats	Joanna Toomey	10.6	1,300	1,510.76	1,562.88	1,581.62	1,612.21	1,649.38	1,713.14	2,158.92	2,618.40
Conservative	Iain G. Gibson	9.6	1,180	1,257.57	1,271.31	1,285.52	1,296.09	1,341.93	1,358.27	1,432.83	
Labour	Donald C Wilson	9.3	1,142	1,270.43	1,718.61	1,746.99	1,769.54	1,810.64	1,877.65	2,027.13	2,158.60
Scottish Green	James N. G. Mackenzie	5.7	702	891.91	919.34	941.22	1,007.12	1,063.20	1,172.87		
Solidarity	Jason J Mangan	1.9	238	349.60	362.97	368.67	431.73	463.41			
Independent	Keith J. Bell	1.7	209	289.50	300.63	334.49	347.87				
Scottish Socialist	Gerry Corbett	1.4	168	249.96	263.70	267.17					
Independent	Tam Smith	1.0	127	156.27	164.33						
Electorate: 24,717 Valid: 11,996 Spoilt: 236 Quota: 2,400 Turnout: 49.5%
