= Forth (Edinburgh ward) =

Electoral ward in Edinburgh, Scotland

Location of the ward within Edinburgh

Forth is one of the seventeen wards used to elect members of the City of Edinburgh Council. Established in 2007 along with the other wards, it currently elects four Councillors. Its territory covers communities in the north of the city between Ferry Road and the coast on the Firth of Forth, including Granton, Newhaven, Pilton, Trinity, Victoria Park and Wardie, some of which historically fell within the boundaries of Leith. A 2017 boundary change caused the loss of the Muirhouse neighbourhood, but housebuilding elsewhere (including various projects in Granton) meant the overall population increased slightly. In 2019, the ward had a population of 31,823.

== Councillors ==
Election	Councillors			
2007	Steve Cardownie (SNP)	Elaine P Morris (Liberal Democrats)	Elizabeth Maginnis (Labour)	Allan Jackson (Conservative)
2008 by	Steve Cardownie (SNP)	Elaine P Morris (Liberal Democrats)	Cammy Day (Labour)	Allan Jackson (Conservative)
2012	Steve Cardownie (SNP)	Elaine P Morris (Liberal Democrats)	Cammy Day (Labour)	Allan Jackson (Conservative)
2017	Eleanor Bird (SNP)	George Gordon (SNP)	Cammy Day (Labour)	Jim Campbell (Conservative)
2022	Stuart Dobbin (SNP)	Sanne Dijkstra-Downie (Liberal Democrats)	Cammy Day (Labour)	Kayleigh O'Neill (Green)

== Election results ==
=== 2022 election ===
Forth - 4 seats
Party	Candidate	FPv%	Count							
Party	Candidate	FPv%	1	2	3	4	5	6	7	8
Liberal Democrats	Sanne Dijkstra-Downie	19.7	2,077	2,094	2,113					
Labour	Cammy Day (incumbent)	18.9	1,995	2,014	2,044	2,044	2,104	2,252		
SNP	Stuart Dobbin	18.2	1,917	1,923	1,938	1,938	3,007			
Conservative	Jim Campbell (incumbent)	15.1	1,594	1,598	1,646	1,646	1,654	1,675	1,701	
SNP	Carrie Gooch	12.8	1,353	1,365	1,369	1,369				
Green	Kayleigh O'Neill	12.7	1,337	1,375	1,390	1,390	1,571	2,014	2,063	2,321
Scottish Family	Linda Lenora Campbell	1.4	152	162						
Women's Equality	Kerry Elizabeth Heathcote	1.2	130							
Electorate: 24,934 Valid: 10,555 Spoilt: 178 Quota: 2,112 Turnout: 43.0%

=== 2017 election ===
2017 City of Edinburgh Council election

Forth - 4 seats
Party	Candidate	FPv%	Count							
Party	Candidate	FPv%	1	2	3	4	5	6	7	8
Conservative	Jim Campbell	28.38%	2,951							
Labour	Cammy Day (incumbent)	15.18%	1,579	1,710	1,731	2,157				
SNP	Eleanor Bird	17.94%	1,866	1,879	1,894	1,917	1,923	2,313		
SNP	George Gordon	13.37%	1,390	1,302	1,421	1,457	1,463	1,638	1,836	2,207
Liberal Democrats	Tim Wight	7.81%	812	1,073	1,149	1,200	1,220	1,572	1,582	
Green	Gillian MacKay	9.99%	1,039	1,085	1,130	1,165	1,178			
Labour	Heather Pugh	5.55%	577	623	651					
Independent	Nicola Ross	1.78%	185	269						
Electorate: 23,348 Valid: 10,399 Spoilt: 214 Quota: 2,080 Turnout: 45.5%

=== 2012 election ===
2012 City of Edinburgh Council election

Forth - 4 seats
Party	Candidate	FPv%	Count							
Party	Candidate	FPv%	1	2	3	4	5	6	7	8
Labour	Cammy Day (incumbent)	27.54%	2,230							
Conservative	Allan Jackson (incumbent)	22.64%	1,833							
SNP	Steve Cardownie (incumbent)	17.01%	1,377	1,407	1,422	1,432	1,443	1,482	1,554	2,377
SNP	George Gordon	12.05%	976	1,008	1,017	1,019	1,034	1,070	1,187	
Green	Kate Joester	7.08%	573	598	626	637	683	850		
Labour	Vicki Redpath	6.47%	524	962	976	987	1,009	1,099	1,347	1,446
Liberal Democrats	Tim Wight	5.06%	410	423	473	495	500			
TUSC	Ruth Ann Henderson	1.44%	117	127	130	132				
Liberal	Seumas Stiubhard MacMhicean	0.70%	57	64	73					
Electorate: 21,796 Valid: 8,097 Spoilt: 136 (1.65%) Quota: 1,620 Turnout: 8,233 (37.8%)

=== 2008 by-election ===
A by-election arose following the death of Labour councillor Elizabeth Maginnis on 7 September 2008. The seat was held by Labour's Cammy Day.

Forth By-Election (6 November 2008) - 1 seat
Party	Candidate	FPv%	Count								
Party	Candidate	FPv%	1	2	3	4	5	6	7	8	9
Labour	Cammy Day	29.53	2,013	2,014	2,023	2,042	2,134	2,228	2,543	2,810	3,735
SNP	George Gordon	27.01	1,841	1,843	1,849	1,861	1,920	2,005	2,259	2,529	
Conservative	Iain McGill	17.31	1,180	1,184	1,187	1,188	1,199	1,225	1,453		
Liberal Democrats	Sanne C. Djikstra-Downie	14.45	985	987	989	995	1,033	1,155			
Green	Kate Joester	5.06	341	343	360	373	410				
Independent	John Loughton	4.36	297	303	307	323					
Solidarity	Willie Black	1.17	80	80	84						
Scottish Socialist	Robert Richard	1.0	53	54							
Independent	James G MacLean	0.05	26								
Electorate: 21,560 Valid: 6,816 Spoilt: 70 Quota: 3,409 Turnout: 6,886

=== 2007 election ===
2007 City of Edinburgh Council election

2007 Council election: Forth
Party	Candidate	FPv%	Count								
Party	Candidate	FPv%	1	2	3	4	5	6	7	8	9
SNP	Steve Cardownie	22.67	2,472								
Conservative	Allan Jackson	20.23	2,206								
Liberal Democrats	Elaine P Morris	17.91	1,953	2,000.44	2,008.23	2,020.41	2,059.83	2,094.96	2,436.61		
Labour	Elizabeth Maginnis	14.82	1,616	1,640.13	1,642.50	1,650.86	1,676.12	1,694.00	1,795.54	1,856.72	3,100.78
Labour	Billy Fitzpatrick	14.19	1,547	1,581.61	1,582.56	1,588.91	1,612.69	1,672.18	1,755.67	1,797.68	
Green	Kate Joester	5.75	627	670.55	672.98	698.89	744.24	822.04			
Independent	Fred Marinello	1.84	201	217.44	218.71	225.06					
Solidarity	Willie Black	1.81	197	227.49	227.70	246.67	270.03				
Scottish Socialist	Marilyn Sangster	0.77	84	92.95	93.03						
Electorate: 20,744 Valid: 10,903 Spoilt: 180 Quota: 2,181 Turnout: 53.4%

Councillor Elaine Morris defected from the Liberal Democrats to the Scottish National Party on 21 July 2011.
