= Leith Walk (ward) =

Electoral ward of Edinburgh, Scotland

Location of the ward

Leith Walk is one of the seventeen wards used to elect members of the City of Edinburgh Council. Established in 2007 along with the other wards, it currently elects four councillors. Its territory spans the area between Edinburgh city centre and the port of Leith to its north-east, centred around Leith Walk, the primary thoroughfare between them.

Northern parts of the ward fall within the historic burgh of Leith, but other neighbourhoods such as Broughton, Powderhall, Hillside and Canonmills (divided between Leith Walk and Inverleith wards) were always part of Edinburgh. Bonnington and Pilrig are on the boundary between the two burghs but entirely within Leith Walk ward, which in 2019 had a population of 34,651.

== Councillors ==
Election	Councillors			
2007	Louise A Lang (Liberal Democrats)	Deidre Brock (SNP)	Maggie Chapman (Greens)	Angela Blacklock (Labour)
2012	Nick Gardner (Labour)	Deidre Brock (SNP)	Maggie Chapman (Greens)	Angela Blacklock (Labour)
2015	Nick Gardner (Labour)	Lewis Ritchie (SNP)	Marion Donaldson (Labour)	Angela Blacklock (Labour)
2017	Susan Rae (Greens)	Lewis Ritchie (SNP)	Marion Donaldson (Labour)	Amy McNeese-Mechan (SNP)
2019	Susan Rae (Greens)	Lewis Ritchie (SNP)	Rob Munn (SNP)	Amy McNeese-Mechan (SNP)
2022	Susan Rae (Greens)	Jack Caldwell (Liberal Democrats)	James Dalgleish (Labour)	Amy McNeese-Mechan (SNP)

== Election results ==
=== 2022 election ===
Leith Walk - 4 seats
Party	Candidate	FPv%	Count											
Party	Candidate	FPv%	1	2	3	4	5	6	7	8	9	10	11	12
Green	Susan Rae (incumbent)	25.9	2,847											
SNP	Amy McNeese-Mechan (incumbent)	20.4	2,248											
Labour	James Dalgleish	18.7	2,058	2,184	2,186	2,186	2,196	2,224						
Liberal Democrats	Jack Caldwell	12.0	1,317	1,400	1,402	1,413	1,433	1,446	1,456	1,469	1,506	1,563	1,995	2,513
SNP	Rob Munn (incumbent)	10.3	1,132	1,405	1,447	1,449	1,459	1,485	1,488	1,534	1,580	1,633	1,648	
Conservative	Bonus Fombo	6.9	763	766	766	770	796	797	799	811	819	833		
Alba	Joe Smith	1.2	135	138	138	144	148	155	155					
Communist	Richard Charles Shillcock	1.1	119	141	141	145	147							
Socialist Labour	David Don Jacobson	1.0	113	139	139	141	148	184	187	206	242			
Scottish Family	Niel Deepnarain	1.0	106	108	108	119								
Women's Equality	David Renton	0.9	98	147	147	154	167	180	181	202				
Freedom Alliance (UK)	Jon Pullman	0.5	60	62	62									
Electorate: 26,683 Valid: 10,996 Spoilt: 134 Quota: 2,200 Turnout: 41.7%

=== 2019 by-election ===
On 28 January 2019, Labour councillor Marion Donaldson announced she was resigning from the council citing reports of internal party tensions. A by-election was held on 11 April 2019 and was won by Robb Munn of the SNP.

Leith Walk By-election (11 April 2019)
Party	Candidate	FPv%	Count										
Party	Candidate	FPv%	1	2	3	4	5	6	7	8	9	10	11
SNP	Rob Munn	35.7	2,596	2,598	2,598	2,598	2,612	2,616	2,630	2,721	2,763	3,021	4,487
Green	Lorna Slater	25.5	1,855	1,856	1,856	1,856	1,865	1,869	1,904	2,093	2,223	2,765	
Labour	Nick Gardner	15.5	1,123	1,124	1,124	1,126	1,136	1,140	1,157	1,320	1,497		
Conservative	Dan McCroskrie	10.7	777	777	779	781	784	811	825	912			
Liberal Democrats	Jack Caldwell	8.6	623	624	624	626	628	633	652				
Independent	Kevin Illingworth	1.5	110	112	112	122	126	143					
UKIP	Steven Alexander	1.2	85	88	97	97	98						
Socialist Labour	David Jacobsen	0.8	56	56	56	56							
Independent	John Scott	0.2	16	16	17								
For Britain	Paul Stirling	0.2	14	14									
Scottish Libertarian	Tom Laird	0.2	12										
Electorate: 24,197 Valid: 7,267 Spoilt: 67 Quota: 3,634 Turnout: 30.3%

=== 2017 election ===
2017 City of Edinburgh Council election

Leith Walk - 4 seats
Party	Candidate	FPv%	Count								
Party	Candidate	FPv%	1	2	3	4	5	6	7	8	9
Green	Susan Rae	19.69%	2,097	2,105	2,125	2,246					
SNP	Lewis Ritchie (incumbent)	17.84%	1,900	1,901	1,903	1,923	1,949.4	2,052.2	2,090.4	2,125.9	2,209.4
SNP	Amy McNeese-Mechan	16.62%	1,770	1,772	1,777	1,788	1,817.5	1,870.9	1,912.9	1,971.4	2,107.7
Labour	Marion Donaldson (incumbent)	15.04%	1,602	1,605	1,617	1,692	1,715.9	1,821.6	2,529.8		
Conservative	Cristina Marga	14.42%	1,536	1,541	1,544	1,600	1,602.6	1,683.2	1,719.3	1,784.5	
Labour	Nick Gardner (incumbent)	7.45%	793	795	803	839	849.3	912.7			
Independent	Harald Tobermann	4.06%	432	459	463	511	522.6				
Liberal Democrats	Vita Zaporozcenko	3.74%	398	400	403						
Socialist Labour	David Don Jacobsen	0.62%	66	67							
Independent	Alan Gordon Melville	0.52%	55								
Electorate: 24,160 Valid: 10,649 Spoilt: 167 Quota: 2,130 Turnout: 10,816 (44.8%)

On 20 February 2018, SNP Cllr. Lewis Ritchie resigned from the party and became an independent, following complaints about his behaviour arising out of allegedly punching someone in a taxi.

=== 2015 by-election ===
SNP councillor Deidre Brock was elected as an MP for Edinburgh North and Leith (UK Parliament constituency) on 7 May 2015 and resigned her Council seat on 24 June 2015. Green Councillor Maggie Chapman resigned her seat on 30 June 2015 to focus her efforts on winning a Scottish Parliament seat in North East Scotland. A by-election for both seats was held on 10 September 2015, Lewis Ritchie defending the SNP seat and Labour's Marion Donaldson taking the other.

Leith Walk By-election (10 September 2015)- 2 Seats
Party	Candidate	FPv%	Count									
Party	Candidate	FPv%	1	2	3	4	5	6	7	8	9	10
SNP	John Ritchie	36.2%	2,290									
Labour	Marion Donaldson	25.7%	1,623	1,650.1	1,653.1	1,659.6	1,661.7	1,680.4	1,697.6	1,798.2	1,990.2	2,717.3
Green	Susan Rae	21.8%	1,381	1,464.6	1,469.8	1,483.4	1,495.3	1,502.7	1,576.1	1,653.3	1,729.9	
Conservative	Gordon Murdie	7.9%	501	503.8	505.8	506.9	507	540.2	541.2	574.6		
Liberal Democrats	Mo Hussain	4%	255	261.6	263	265.3	265.3	267.4	271.6			
UKIP	Alan Melville	1.6%	102	105.6	105.6	106.8	106.8					
Scottish Socialist	Natalie Reid	1.5%	97	107.7	107.7	108.2	122	125.2				
Left Unity	Bruce Whitehead	0.5%	32	33.6	33.7	33.9						
Independent	John Scott	0.4%	26	29	30							
Scottish Libertarian	Tom Laird	0.3%	17	17.9								
Electorate: 25,521 Valid: 6,324 Spoilt: 83 Quota: 2,109 Turnout: 6,407 (25.1%)

=== 2012 election ===
2012 City of Edinburgh Council election

Leith Walk - 4 seats
Party	Candidate	FPv%	Count										
Party	Candidate	FPv%	1	2	3	4	5	6	7	8	9	10	11
SNP	Deidre Brock (incumbent)†††	22.1	1735										
Labour	Angela Blacklock (incumbent)	21.3	1674										
Green	Maggie Chapman †††† (incumbent)	20.3	1593										
Labour	Nick Gardner	11.9	937	947	1029	1035	1050	1065	1089	1115	1225	1350	1519
Conservative	Miles Briggs	8.1	637	640	644	645	651	653	656	675	784	816	
SNP	Seumas Ross Skinner	6.4	502	630	632	635	639	649	674	708	741		
Liberal Democrats	Jamie Paterson	5.1	400	403	406	410	424	429	434	445			
TUSC	John McArdle	1.4	109	110	111	113	119	128					
Independent	Alex Wilson	1.4	109	110	110	111	112	153	181				
Independent	Jimmy McIntosh	1.2	91	92	93	93	97						
Liberal	John Hein	0.9	69	71	72	72							
Electorate: 22,147 Valid: 7,856 Spoilt: 156 Quota: 1572 Turnout: 35.47%

=== 2007 election ===
2007 City of Edinburgh Council election

2007 Council election: Leith Walk
Party	Candidate	FPv%	Count									
Party	Candidate	FPv%	1	2	3	4	5	6	7	8	9	10
SNP	Deidre Brock	22.3	2,550									
Liberal Democrats	Louise A Lang	19.0	2,170	2,217.17	2,217.29	2,240.22	2,291.06					
Labour	Angela Blacklock	16.9	1,937	1,965.54	1,966.54	1,975.35	1,997.40	2,003.09	2,041.43	2,173.28	2,215.25	3,161.41
Green	Maggie Chapman	15.3	1,754	1,824.81	1,829.81	1,911.26	1,953.36	1,967.18	2,103.10	2,424.74		
Labour	Trevor Davies	10.0	1,144	1,156.81	1,156.81	1,165.28	1,180.09	1,183.88	1,196.35	1,312.35	1,333.29	
Conservative	Iain McGill	9.7	1,114	1,129.49	1,133.61	1,133.96	1,149.24	1,154.49	1,162.67			
Solidarity	Adrian Cannon	1.8	203	228.16	230.27	273.069	283.23	284.33				
Liberal	John Hein	1.7	193	207.33	207.44	211.02						
Scottish Socialist	Linda Somerville	1.6	182	192.95	193.06							
Independent	Peter Clifford	0.1	16	16.58								
Electorate: 21,485 Valid: 11,263 Spoilt: 188 Quota: 2,253 Turnout: 53.3%
