= 2012 City of Edinburgh Council election =

2012 Scottish local government election

- 3 May 2012

All 58 seats to City of Edinburgh Council 30 seats needed for a majority
	First party	Second party	Third party
Leader	Andrew Burns	Steve Cardownie	Jeremy Balfour
Party	Labour	SNP	Conservative
Leader's seat	Fountainbridge /Craiglockhart	Forth	Corstorphine /Murrayfield
Last election	15 seats, 22.93%	12 seats, 20.32%	11 seats, 22.08%
Seats before	15	13	11
Seats won	20	18	11
Seat change	▲5	▲6	0
Popular vote	39,286	37,537	27,588
Percentage	28.13%	26.87%	19.75%
Swing	▲5.45%	▲6.55%	▼2.33%
	Fourth party	Fifth party
Leader	Maggie Chapman and Steve Burgess	Paul Edie
Party	Green	Liberal Democrats
Leader's seat	Leith Walk, Southside /Newington	Corstorphine /Murrayfield
Last election	3 seats, 8.23%	17 seats, 21.99%
Seats before	3	17
Seats won	6	3
Seat change	▲3	▼14
Popular vote	15,978	13,040
Percentage	11.44%	9.34%
Swing	▲3.21%	▼12.65%
- Map of council wards
Leader of the Council before election
Jenny Dawe defeated
Liberal Democrats
Leader of the council after election
Andrew Burns
Labour

Elections to the City of Edinburgh Council were held on 3 May 2012, the same day as the 2012 Scottish local elections. The election was the second using 17 new wards created as a result of the Local Governance (Scotland) Act 2004, each ward elected three or four Councillors using the single transferable vote system form of proportional representation system of election.

The main feature of the elections was the near obliteration of the Scottish Liberal Democrats as they collapsed from 17 seats on the city council to just 3, which saw them occupying the position as the smallest party. Their leader, and the leader of the council, Jenny Dawe, lost her seat in Meadows/Morningside, epitomising the poor performance. Scottish Labour replaced the Lib Dems as the largest party as they made 5 gains, winning 20 seats in total. The Scottish National Party became the second largest party, gaining 6 seats and 18 seats in total. The Scottish Conservatives retained 11 seats on the council while the Scottish Greens doubled their seat numbers to 6.

After the election a coalition was formed between the Labour Party and the SNP. This replaced the previous Lib Dem – SNP Coalition which had existed from 2007 to 2012.

== Election result ==
2012 City of Edinburgh Council election Electorate: 331,954 Turnout: 141,552 (42.6%) Total Valid: 139,684
Party	Seats	Gains	Losses	Net gain/loss	Seats %	Votes %	Votes	+/−
Labour	20	6	1	▲5	34.48	28.13	39,286	▲5.45
SNP	18	6	0	▲6	31.03	26.87	37,537	▲6.55
Conservative	11	1	1	0	18.97	19.75	27,588	▼2.33
Green	6	3	0	▲3	10.34	11.44	15,978	▲3.21
Liberal Democrats	3	0	14	▼14	5.17	9.34	13,040	▼12.65
Independent	0	0	0	0	0.00	1.84	2,565	New
UKIP	0	0	0	0	0.00	0.34	480	New
TUSC	0	0	0	0	0.00	0.33	463	New
Liberal	0	0	0	0	0.00	0.26	368	New
Scottish Socialist	0	0	0	0	0.00	0.16	228	New
Pirate	0	0	0	0	0.00	0.14	195	New

Note: "Votes" are the first preference votes. The net gain/loss and percentage changes relate to the result of the previous Scottish local elections on 3 May 2007. This may differ from other published sources showing gain/loss relative to seats held at dissolution of Scotland's councils.

== Ward summary ==
Map of Council Wards showing parties elected in each ward

Results of the 2012 City of Edinburgh Council election by ward
Ward	%	Seats	%	Seats	%	Seats	%	Seats	%	Seats	%	Seats	Total
Ward	Labour		SNP		Conservative		Green		Lib Dem		Others		Total
Almond	14.92	0	32.55	1	26.24	1	6.17	0	15.89	1	4.22	0	3
Pentland Hills	28.85	1	29.16	1	27.70	1	4.05	0	4.66	0	5.59	0	3
Drum Brae/Gyle	26.46	1	27.00	1	16.04	0	3.62	0	18.77	1	8.12	0	3
Forth	34.01	2	29.06	1	22.64	1	7.08	0	5.06	0	2.14	0	4
Inverleith	24.99	1	20.22	1	29.50	1	14.92	1	10.38	0	-	-	4
Corstorphine/Murrayfield	20.45	0	24.74	1	24.96	1	6.11	0	22.77	1	1.96	0	3
Sighthill/Gorgie	42.1	2	37.4	2	9.2	0	8.2	0	3.2	0	-	-	4
Colinton/Fairmilehead	17.87	0	20.59	1	52.00	2	4.91	0	3.62	0	1.01	0	3
Fountainbridge/Craiglockhart	23.24	1	23.54	1	21.15	0	24.07	1	7.34	0	0.66	0	3
Meadows/Morningside	19.64	1	15.78	1	29.90	1	19.75	1	12.30	0	2.63	0	4
City Centre	21.33	1	24.97	1	27.69	1	17.06	0	7.94	0	1.01	0	3
Leith Walk	33.24	2	28.48	1	8.11	0	20.28	1	5.09	0	4.81	0	4
Leith	32.1	1	32.4	1	6.5	0	18.9	1	9.0	0	1.1	0	3
Craigentinny/Duddingston	36.2	2	36.9	1	10.2	0	7.0	0	8.0	0	1.8	0	3
Southside/Newington	19.78	1	18.34	1	16.72	1	19.97	1	13.97	0	11.22	0	4
Liberton/Gilmerton	40.9	2	31.6	1	12.3	1	5.2	0	7.6	0	2.5	0	4
Portobello/Craigmillar	47.4	2	32.0	1	7.2	0	8.5	0	1.9	0	2.9	0	3
Total	28.13	20	26.87	18	19.75	11	11.55	6	9.34	3		0	58

== Ward results ==
=== Almond ===
2007: 1xCon; 1xLib Dem; 1xSNP
2012: 1xSNP; 1xCon; 1xLib Dem
2007-2012 Change: No Change

2012 Council election: Almond – 3 seats
Party	Candidate	FPv%	Count						
Party	Candidate	FPv%	1	2	3	4	5	6	7
SNP	Norman Work (incumbent)	32.55%	2,722						
Conservative	Lindsay Paterson	26.24%	2,194						
Liberal Democrats	Alastair Shields††††††	15.89%	1,329	1,460	1,500	1,515	1,579	1,804	2,426
Labour	Billy Fitzpatrick	14.92%	1,248	1,350	1,356	1,373	1,421	1,623	
Green	Moira Dunworth	6.17%	516	651	657	683	768		
Independent	John Longstaff	2.49%	208	268	276	338			
UKIP	Otto Inglis	1.73%	145	168	181				
Electorate: 18,996 Valid: 8,362 Spoilt: 51 Quota: 2,091 Turnout: 8,413 (44.3%)

=== Pentland Hills ===
2007: 1xCon; 1xSNP; 1xLab
2012: 1xSNP; 1xLab; 1xCon
2007-2012 Change: No Change

Pentland Hills – 3 seats
Party	Candidate	FPv%	Count						
Party	Candidate	FPv%	1	2	3	4	5	6	7
SNP	Bill Henderson	29.16%	2,317						
Labour	Ricky Henderson (incumbent)	28.85%	2,293						
Conservative	Dominic Heslop	15.09%	1,199	1,224	1,249	1,335	1,397	1,502	2,446
Conservative	Shelia Low	12.61%	1,002	1,017	1,040	1,099	1,154	1,240	
Green	Phyl Meyer	4.05%	322	400	468	607	840		
Independent	Mike 'Professor Pongoo' Ferrigan	5.59%	444	491	531	590			
Liberal Democrats	Stuart Bridges	4.66%	370	414	462				
Electorate: 18,002 Valid: 7,947 Spoilt: 51 Quota: 1,987 Turnout: 7,998 (44.4%)

=== Drum Brae/Gyle ===
2007: 2xLib Dem; 1xSNP
2012: 1xLab; 1xSNP; 1xLib Dem
2007-2012 Change: Lab gain one seat from Lib Dem

Drum Brae/Gyle – 3 seats
Party	Candidate	FPv%	Count							
Party	Candidate	FPv%	1	2	3	4	5	6	7	8
Labour	Karen Keil	26.46%	1,981							
Liberal Democrats	Robert Aldridge (incumbent)	18.77%	1,405	1,425	1,431	1,490	1,636	1,695	1,735	2,312
SNP	Ron Cairns *	18.34%	1,373	1,383	1,386	1,406	1,466	2,052		
Conservative	Mark Brown	16.04%	1,201	1,207	1,212	1,233	1,349	1,370	1,383	
SNP	Alison Lindsay	8.66%	648	657	661	699	750			
Independent	Steven Binney	6.92%	518	532	588	663				
Green	Linda Hendry	3.62%	271	285	296					
Independent	John Scott	1.20%	90	95						
Electorate: 17,123 Valid: 7,487 Spoilt: 78 Quota: 1,872 Turnout: 7,565 (44.2%)

- =Outgoing Councillor from a different Ward.

=== Forth ===
- 2007: 1xSNP; 1xCon; 1xLib Dem; 1xLab
- 2012: 2xLab; 1xSNP; 1xCon
- 2007-2012 Change: Lab gain one seat from Lib Dem

Forth – 4 seats
Party	Candidate	FPv%	Count							
Party	Candidate	FPv%	1	2	3	4	5	6	7	8
Labour	Cammy Day (incumbent)	27.54%	2,230							
Conservative	Allan Jackson (incumbent)	22.64%	1,833							
SNP	Steve Cardownie (incumbent)	17.01%	1,377	1,407	1,422	1,432	1,443	1,482	1,554	2,377
SNP	George Gordon	12.05%	976	1,008	1,017	1,019	1,034	1,070	1,187	
Green	Kate Joester	7.08%	573	598	626	637	683	850		
Labour	Vicki Redpath	6.47%	524	962	976	987	1,009	1,099	1,347	1,446
Liberal Democrats	Tim Wight	5.06%	410	423	473	495	500			
TUSC	Ruth Ann Henderson	1.44%	117	127	130	132				
Liberal	Seumas Stiubhard MacMhicean	0.70%	57	64	73					
Electorate: 21,796 Valid: 8,097 Spoilt: 136 (1.65%) Quota: 1,620 Turnout: 8,233 (37.8%)

=== Inverleith ===
- 2007: 1xLab; 1xCon; 1xSNP; 1xLib Dem
- 2012: 1xSNP; 1xCon; 1xLab; 1xGreen
- 2007-2012 Change: Green gain one seat from Lib Dem

Inverleith – 4 seats
Party	Candidate	FPv%	Count			
Party	Candidate	FPv%	1	2	3	4
Labour	Lesley Hinds (incumbent)	24.99%	2,751			
Conservative	Iain Whyte (incumbent)	17.77%	1,956	1,989	2,019	2,279
Green	Nigel Bagshaw	14.92%	1,642	1,815	1,865	2,325
SNP	Gavin Barrie	13.03%	1,434	1,489	2,148	2,264
Conservative	Scott Douglas	11.73%	1,291	1,312	1,326	1,487
Liberal Democrats	Tim McKay (incumbent)	10.38%	1,143	1,226	1,252	
SNP	John Young	7.19%	792	820		
Electorate: 23,235 Valid: 11,009 Spoilt: 118 (1.06%) Quota: 2,202 Turnout: 11,127 (47.9%)

=== Corstorphine/Murrayfield ===
- 2007: 2xLib Dem; 1xCon
- 2012: 1xCon; 1xSNP; 1xLib Dem
- 2007-2012 Change: SNP gain one seat from Lib Dem

Corstorphine/Murrayfield – 3 seats
Party	Candidate	FPv%	Count					
Party	Candidate	FPv%	1	2	3	4	5	6
Conservative	Jeremy Balfour (incumbent)	24.96%	2,050	2,100				
SNP	Frank Ross	24.74%	2,032	2,053	2,056			
Liberal Democrats	Paul Edie (incumbent)	21.77%	1,788	1,798	1,817	1,818	1,993	2,798
Labour	Tom McInally	20.45%	1,679	1,698	1,702	1,702	1,884	
Green	Dominic Hinde	6.11%	502	526	530	530		
UKIP	James Nisbet	1.96%	161					
Electorate: 17,445 Valid: 8,212 Spoilt: 56 (0.68%) Quota: 2,054 Turnout: 8,268 (47.4%)

=== Sighthill/Gorgie ===
2007: 2xLab; 1xSNP; 1xLib Dem
2012: 2xLab; 2xSNP;
2007-2012 Change: SNP gain one seat from Lib Dem

Sighthill/Gorgie – 4 seats
Party	Candidate	FPv%	Count					
Party	Candidate	FPv%	1	2	3	4	5	6
Labour	Eric Milligan (incumbent)	28.3	2,266					
SNP	Catherine Fullerton	20.3	1,624					
SNP	Denis Dixon	17.1	1,368	1,389	1,396	1,414	1,462	1,688
Labour	Donald Wilson (incumbent)	13.8	1,107	1,677				
Conservative	Susan Dewhurst	9.2	736	745	749	750	808	917
Green	Lindsay Ashford	8.2	658	674	690	691	776	
Liberal Democrats	Neil MacLean	3.2	253	260	267	267		
Electorate: 23,877 Valid: 8,012 Spoilt: 240 (2.91%) Quota: 1,603 Turnout: 8,252 (34.6%)

=== Colinton/Fairmilehead ===
- 2007: 2xCon; 1xLab
- 2012: 2xCon; 1xSNP
- 2007-2012 Change: SNP gain one seat from Lab

Colinton/Fairmilehead – 3 seats
Party	Candidate	FPv%	Count						
Party	Candidate	FPv%	1	2	3	4	5	6	7
Conservative	Jason Rust (incumbent)	28.71%	2,692						
Conservative	Elaine Aitken (incumbent)	23.29%	2,184	2,427					
SNP	Richard Lewis	20.59%	1,931	1,953	1,962	1,975	2,021	2,187	2,816
Labour	Eric Barry (incumbent)	17.87%	1,676	1,699	1,708	1,724	1,831	2,070	
Green	Andy Saunders	4.91%	460	474	484	501	647		
Liberal Democrats	Alan Beal	3.62%	339	350	365	368			
UKIP	Malcolm MacKay	1.01%	95	100	105				
Electorate: 18,521 Valid: 9,377 Spoilt: 74 (0.78%) Quota: 2,345 Turnout: 9,451 (51%)

=== Fountainbridge/Craiglockhart ===
- 2007: 1xCon; 1xLab; 1xLib Dem
- 2012: 1xGrn; 1xLab; 1xSNP
- 2007-2012 Change: Grn and SNP gain one seat each from Con and Lib Dem

2007 Council election: Fountainbridge/Craiglockhart – 3 seats
Party	Candidate	FPv%	Count				
Party	Candidate	FPv%	1	2	3	4	5
Green	Gavin Corbett	24.07%	1,789	1,801	2,004		
SNP	David Key	23.54%	1,750	1,755	1,811	1,848	1,861
Labour	Andrew Burns (incumbent)	23.24%	1,728	1,734	1,851	1,905	
Conservative	Will Searle	21.15%	1,572	1,578	1,714	1,731	1,738
Liberal Democrats	Jim Lowrie (incumbent)	7.34%	546	561			
Liberal	Tim Strode	0.66%	49				
Electorate: 17,069 Valid: 7,434 Spoilt: 70 (0.93%) Quota: 1,859 Turnout: 7,504 (44%)

=== Meadows/Morningside ===
- 2007: 1xCon; 1xLib Dem; 1xGRN; 1xLab
- 2012: 1xCon; 1xGRN; 1xLab; 1xSNP
- 2007-2012 Change: SNP gain one seat from Lib Dem

Meadows/Morningside – 4 seats
Party	Candidate	FPv%	Count						
Party	Candidate	FPv%	1	2	3	4	5	6	7
Conservative	Mark McInnes (incumbent)	29.90	3,125						
Green	Melanie Main	19.75	2,064	2,209					
Labour	Paul Godzik (incumbent)	19.64	2,053	2,171	2171				
SNP	Sandy Howat	15.79	1,650	1,723	1,754	1,767	1,784	1,857	2,390
Liberal Democrats	Jenny Dawe *	12.30	1,285	1,574	1,615	1,639	1,661	1,730	
Pirate	Phil Hunt	1.87	195	211	224	230	264		
UKIP	William Macadam	0.76	79	170	173	175			
Electorate: 22,328 Valid: 10,451 Spoilt: 39 Quota: 2,091 Turnout: 10,490 (47%)

- = Outgoing Councillor from a different Ward.

=== City Centre ===
- 2007: 1xSNP; 1xCon; 1xLib Dem
- 2012: 1xCon; 1xSNP; 1xLab
- 2007-2012 Change: Lab gain one seat from Lib Dem

City Centre – 3 seats
Party	Candidate	FPv%	Count					
Party	Candidate	FPv%	1	2	3	4	5	6
Conservative	Joanna Mowat (incumbent)	27.69%	1,402					
SNP	Alasdair Rankin (incumbent)	24.97%	1,264	1,272				
Labour	Karen Doran	21.33%	1,080	1,093	1,094	1,101	1,235	1,777
Green	Julita Mazurek	17.06%	864	887	890	907	1,111	
Liberal Democrats	Iain Coleman	7.94%	402	439	440	463		
Liberal	Karen Hetherington	1.01%	51	58	59			
Electorate: 13,943 Valid: 5,063 Spoilt: 38 (0.74%) Quota: 1,266 Turnout: 5,101 (36.6%)

=== Leith Walk ===
- 2007: 1xSNP; 1xLib Dem; 1xLab; 1xGRN
- 2012: 2xLab; 1xSNP; 1xGRN
- 2007-2012 Change: Lab gain one seat from Lib Dem

Leith Walk – 4 seats
Party	Candidate	FPv%	Count										
Party	Candidate	FPv%	1	2	3	4	5	6	7	8	9	10	11
SNP	Deidre Brock (incumbent)†††	22.1	1735										
Labour	Angela Blacklock (incumbent)	21.3	1674										
Green	Maggie Chapman †††† (incumbent)	20.3	1593										
Labour	Nick Gardner	11.9	937	947	1029	1035	1050	1065	1089	1115	1225	1350	1519
Conservative	Miles Briggs	8.1	637	640	644	645	651	653	656	675	784	816	
SNP	Seumas Ross Skinner	6.4	502	630	632	635	639	649	674	708	741		
Liberal Democrats	Jamie Paterson	5.1	400	403	406	410	424	429	434	445			
TUSC	John McArdle	1.4	109	110	111	113	119	128					
Independent	Alex Wilson	1.4	109	110	110	111	112	153	181				
Independent	Jimmy McIntosh	1.2	91	92	93	93	97						
Liberal	John Hein	0.9	69	71	72	72							
Electorate: 22,147 Valid: 7,856 Spoilt: 156 Quota: 1572 Turnout: 35.47%

=== Leith ===
- 2007: 1xSNP; 1xLib Dem; 1xLab
- 2012: 1xLab; 1xGRN; 1xSNP
- 2007-2012 Change: GRN gain one seat from Lib Dem

2007 Council election: Leith – 3 seats
Party	Candidate	FPv%	Count						
Party	Candidate	FPv%	1	2	3	4	5	6	7
Labour	Gordon Munro (incumbent)	32.1%	2010						
Green	Chas Booth	18.9%	1181	1306	1331	1427	1780		
SNP	Adam McVey	17.6%	1104	1140	1145	1163	1228	1280	2240
SNP	Rob Munn (incumbent)	14.8%	926	984	993	1013	1135	1169	
Liberal Democrats	Marjorie Thomas (incumbent)	9.0%	565	618	641	825			
Conservative	Nicola Ross	6.5%	405	428	433				
Liberal	Irvine McMinn	1.1%	71	85					
Electorate: 16,972 Valid: 6262 Spoilt: 122 Quota: 1566 Turnout: 32.6%

=== Craigentinny/Duddingston ===
- 2007: 1xLab; 1xSNP; 1xLib Dem
- 2012: 2xLab; 1xSNP
- 2007-2012 Change: Lab gain one seat from Lib Dem

Craigentinny/Duddingston – 3 seats
Party	Candidate	FPv%	Count							
Party	Candidate	FPv%	1	2	3	4	5	6	7	8
SNP	Stefan Tymkewycz (incumbent)	25.8%	2180							
Labour	Joan Griffiths	25.7%	2174							
SNP	Colin Williamson	11.1%	937	989	991	1008	1138	1260	1354	
Labour	Alex Lunn††	10.5%	886	887	935	954	1080	1261	1430	1740
Conservative	Jason Lingiah	10.2%	866	867	868	877	911	1080		
Liberal Democrats	Gary Peacock (incumbent)	8.0%	673	675	677	688	836			
Green	John Palmer	7.0%	590	592	594	661				
TUSC	Kevin Furguson	1.8%	150	150	151					
Electorate: 18,871 Valid: 8,456 Spoilt: 212 Quota: 2115 Turnout: 45.9%

=== Southside/Newington ===
- 2007: 1xLab; 1xCon; 1xLib Dem; 1xGRN
- 2012: 1xGrn; 1xLab; 1xSNP; 1xCon
- 2007-2012 Change: SNP gain one seat from Lib Dem

Southside/Newington – 4 seats
Party	Candidate	FPv%	Count							
Party	Candidate	FPv%	1	2	3	4	5	6	7	8
Green	Steve Burgess (incumbent)	19.97%	1,869	1,883						
Labour	Ian Perry (incumbent)	19.78%	1,851	1,856	1,858	1,886				
SNP	Jim Orr†††	18.34%	1,717	1,723	1,725	1,742	1,744	1,886		
Conservative	Cameron Rose (incumbent)	16.72%	1,565	1,568	1,568	1,570	1,571	1,855	1,857	2,501
Liberal Democrats	Gordon MacKenzie (incumbent)	13.97%	1,308	1,341	1,343	1,348	1,351	1,548	1,551	
Independent	Gordon Murdie	9.53%	892	895	896	921	923			
TUSC	William Black	0.93%	87	90	91					
Liberal	Margaret Lea	0.76%	71							
Electorate: 20,821 Valid: 9,360 Spoilt: 67 (0.71%) Quota: 1,873 Turnout: 9,427 (45.3%)

=== Liberton/Gilmerton ===
- 2007: 2xLab; 1xSNP; 1xLib Dem
- 2012: 2xLab; 1xSNP; 1xCon
- 2007-2012 Change: Con gain one seat from Lib Dem

Liberton/Gilmerton – 4 seats
Party	Candidate	FPv%	Count							
Party	Candidate	FPv%	1	2	3	4	5	6	7	8
Labour	Norma Austin-Hart (incumbent)	21.4	1,941							
SNP	Tom Buchanan (incumbent)†	19.6	1,780	1,789	1,794	1,826				
Labour	Bill Cook (incumbent)	19.5	1,768	1,868						
Conservative	Nick Cook	12.3	1,111	1,112	1,115	1,124	1,125	1,171	1,455	1,696
SNP	Derek Howie	12.0	1,084	1,086	1,090	1,127	1,138	1,268	1,441	
Liberal Democrats	John Knox	7.6	687	689	694	711	711	848		
Green	Joan Carter	5.2	469	473	480	549	550			
Scottish Socialist	Colin Fox	2.5	228	229	233					
Electorate: 23,187 Valid: 9,068 Spoilt: 191 (2.06%) Quota: 1,814 Turnout: 9,259 (39.9%)

=== Portobello/Craigmillar ===
- 2007: 1xSNP; 1xLab; 1xLib Dem
- 2012: 2xLab; 1xSNP
- 2007-2012 Change: Lab gain one seat from Lib Dem

Portobello/Craigmillar – 3 seats
Party	Candidate	FPv%	Count							
Party	Candidate	FPv%	1	2	3	4	5	6	7	8
Labour	Maureen Child (incumbent)	36.6	2,645							
SNP	Michael A. Bridgeman (incumbent)	20.4	1,477	1,559	1,565	1,607	1,649	2,381		
SNP	David Manson	11.6	837	879	891	921	953			
Labour	David Walker	10.8	784	1,212	1,237	1,270	1,319	1,356	1,431	1,744
Green	Peter McColl	8.5	615	723	768	825	974	1,059	1,203	
Conservative	Henry Christian	7.2	523	549	574	601				
Independent	Norrie Davies	2.9	213	253	261					
Liberal Democrats	Martin Veart	1.9	137	155						
Electorate: 17,603 Valid: 7,231 Spoilt: 169 (2.28%) Quota: 1,808 Turnout: 7,400 (42%)

== Post-election changes ==
- † Liberton/Gilmerton SNP councillor Tom Buchanan died on 3 April 2013. A by-election was held on 20 June 2013 and was won by Labour's Keith John Robson.
- †† Craigentinny/Duddingston Labour councillor Alex Dunn defected from the Labour Party and joined the SNP on 4 December 2013.
- ††† On 1 March 2014 Southside/Newington SNP councillor Jim Orr resigned from the party and became an Independent citing disillusionment with internal political spats.
- †††† Leith Walk SNP councillor Deidre Brock was elected as an MP for Edinburgh North and Leith (UK Parliament constituency) on 7 May 2015 and resigned her Council seat on 24 June 2015. Leith Walk Green councillor Maggie Chapman resigned her seat on 30 June 2015 to focus her efforts on winning a Scottish Parliament seat in North East Scotland. A by-election for both seats was held on 10 September 2015, Lewis Ritchie defending the SNP seat and Labour's Marion Donaldson taking the other.
- †††††† Almond Liberal Democrat councillor Alastair Shields resigned from the party and became an Independent after having been de-selected. He originally indicated that he would contest the 2017 local elections as an Independent, but ruled this out in October 2016.

== By Elections since 2012 ==
Liberton/Gilmerton By-election (20 June 2013)- 1 Seat
Party	Candidate	FPv%	Count						
Party	Candidate	FPv%	1	2	3	4	5	6	7
Labour	Keith John Robson	39.47	2,892	2,896	2,906	2,941	3,070	3,255	3,448
SNP	Derek Howie	30.69	2,249	2,251	2,256	2,287	2,403	2,523	2,633
Conservative	Stephanie Murray	11.23	823	824	836	903	934	1,098	
Liberal Democrats	John Christopher Knox	8.26	605	611	616	625	708		
Green	Alys Mumford	5.62	412	430	440	471			
UKIP	Jonathan Stanley	3.21	235	239	251				
Independent	John Scott	0.87	64	70					
Pirate	Phil Hunt	0.64	47						
Electorate: 24,177 Valid: 7,246 Spoilt: 81 Quota: 3,664 Turnout: 7,327 (30.6%)

Leith Walk By-election (10 September 2015)- 2 Seats
Party	Candidate	FPv%	Count									
Party	Candidate	FPv%	1	2	3	4	5	6	7	8	9	10
SNP	John Ritchie	36.2%	2,290									
Labour	Marion Donaldson	25.7%	1,623	1,650.1	1,653.1	1,659.6	1,661.7	1,680.4	1,697.6	1,798.2	1,990.2	2,717.3
Green	Susan Rae	21.8%	1,381	1,464.6	1,469.8	1,483.4	1,495.3	1,502.7	1,576.1	1,653.3	1,729.9	
Conservative	Gordon Murdie	7.9%	501	503.8	505.8	506.9	507	540.2	541.2	574.6		
Liberal Democrats	Mo Hussain	4.0%	255	261.6	263	265.3	265.3	267.4	271.6			
UKIP	Alan Melville	1.6%	102	105.6	105.6	106.8	106.8					
Scottish Socialist	Natalie Reid	1.5%	97	107.7	107.7	108.2	122	125.2				
Left Unity	Bruce Whitehead	0.5%	32	33.6	33.7	33.9						
Independent	John Scott	0.4%	26	29	30							
Scottish Libertarian	Tom Laird	0.3%	17	17.9								
Electorate: 25,521 Valid: 6,324 Spoilt: 83 Quota: 2,109 Turnout: 6,407 (25.1%)
