= Sanne Dijkstra-Downie =

Scottish politician

Cllr Sanne Dijkstra-Downie MSP
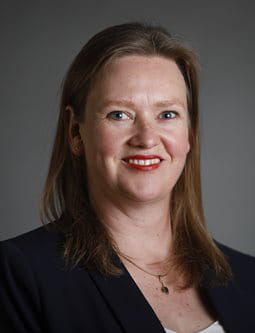
- Official portrait, 2026

Member of the Scottish Parliament for Edinburgh Northern
- Incumbent
- Assumed office 7 May 2026
- Preceded by: Constituency established
- Majority: 2,493 (6.7%)

Member of City of Edinburgh Council for Forth
- Incumbent
- Assumed office 5 May 2022

Scottish Liberal Democrat portfolios
- 2026–present: Spokesperson for Climate, Environment and Energy

Personal details
- Born: August 1981 (age 44–45) Netherlands
- Party: Scottish Liberal Democrats

Sanne Carlien Dijkstra-Downie (born August 1981) is a Scottish politician who has served as the Member of the Scottish Parliament (MSP) for the Edinburgh Northern constituency since 2026. She has been a member of City of Edinburgh Council since 2022.

== Political career ==
At the 2017 City of Edinburgh Council election she was a candidate for the Leith ward.

In the 2022 City of Edinburgh Council election, she was elected as a councillor for the Forth ward.

In February 2025, she was announced the candidate for Edinburgh Northern. She was elected in the 2026 Scottish Parliament election, defeating fellow councillor Euan Hyslop from the SNP. She said she would stay on as councillor until the end of her term.

On 14 May 2026, she was officially sworn in as an MSP. After making her oath of allegiance in English, she repeated the oath in Dutch, thought to be the first time the language was used in this way in the Scottish Parliament.

On 9 June 2026, she was appointed as the Scottish Liberal Democrat spokesperson for Climate, Environment and Energy.

== Personal life ==
Dijkstra-Downie grew up in the Netherlands and came to Scotland to study at Edinburgh University and has now lived in the constituency for over 20 years with her husband and two children.
