= Frank Ross (Scottish politician) =

Lord Provost of Edinburgh (born 1959)

Cllr Frank Ross
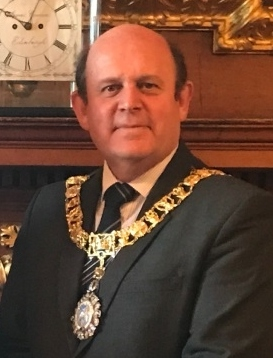
- Ross in 2018

City of Edinburgh Councillor for Corstorphine/Murrayfield ward
- Incumbent
- Assumed office May 2012

Former Lord Provost of Edinburgh
- In office April 2014 – May 2022

Personal details
- Born: Frank Ross; 1959 (age 66–67) London, England
- Party: Scottish National Party
- Spouse: Hanna Ross
- Children: 2
- Education: Napier University

Frank Ross (born 1959) is a Scottish politician who served as Lord Provost of Edinburgh from April 2017 until May 2022. A member of the Scottish National Party (SNP), he has been a councillor for the Corstorphine/Murrayfield ward in the City of Edinburgh Council since 2012.

Born in London, England, Ross moved to Glasgow before attending school in Edinburgh. He attended the Edinburgh Napier University, earning a BA in Business Studies. He is a Fellow of the Chartered Institute of Management Accountants. In the 2012 Scottish local elections, he was elected to represent the Corstorphine/Murrayfield ward. Ross served as Deputy Leader of the council before being elected as Lord Provost in April 2017.

== Early life and education ==
Frank Ross was born in 1959 in London, England. In his early years he moved to Glasgow before attending Leith Academy from 1964 to 1970 and George Watson's College from 1970 to 1975 in Edinburgh. He gained a BA in Business Studies from Napier University and worked as an accountant before becoming an elected representative.

== Political career ==
Ross was elected as Scottish National Party councillor for the City of Edinburgh Council for the Corstorphine/Murrayfield ward in 2012. He served as Convener of the Economy Committee for three years. He served as Depute Leader of the Council and in April 2017, he became the Edinburgh's 257th Lord Provost and Lord Lieutenant.

== Personal life ==
Ross lives in Edinburgh with his wife Hanna Ross and their two children. He enjoys bowling, curling, rugby and football, and is a Heart of Midlothian FC supporter. He is a Fellow of the Chartered Institute of Management Accountants.
