= Leith (ward) =

Electoral ward in Edinburgh, Scotland

Location of the ward

Leith is one of the seventeen wards used to elect members of the City of Edinburgh Council. Established in 2007 along with the other wards, it currently elects three councillors.

Its territory is located north-east of the city centre bounded by the coast on the Firth of Forth, pertaining to the heart of the port and former independent burgh of Leith (outer parts of which fall into other wards). In 2019, the ward had a population of 24,207.

== Councillors ==
Election	Councillors		
2007	Marjorie Thomas (Liberal Democrats)	Rob Munn (SNP)	Gordon Munro (Labour)
2012	Chas Booth (Greens)	Adam McVey (SNP)	Gordon Munro (Labour)
2017	Chas Booth (Greens)	Adam McVey (SNP)	Gordon Munro (Labour)
2022	Chas Booth (Greens)	Adam McVey (SNP)	Katrina Faccenda (Labour)

== Election results ==
=== 2022 election ===
Leith - 3 seats
Party	Candidate	FPv%	Count				
Party	Candidate	FPv%	1	2	3	4	5
SNP	Adam McVey (incumbent)	32.6	2,754				
Green	Chas Booth (incumbent)	25.7	2,169				
Labour	Katrina Faccenda	21.4	1,804	2,025	2,056	2,077	2,111
Conservative	Teresa Perchard	9.0	764	773	774	793	806
Independent	Andy MacKenzie	4.4	370	413	418	439	513
Liberal Democrats	Robin Thomas Rea	4.3	360	434	443	448	470
Alba	Euan McGlynn	1.5	129	206	208	214	
Scottish Family	Jacqueline Mary Isseri	1.1	92	103	104		
Electorate: 19,420 Valid: 8,442 Spoilt: 104 Quota: 2,111 Turnout: 44.0%

=== 2017 election ===
2017 City of Edinburgh Council election

Leith - 3 seats
Party	Candidate	FPv%	Count			
Party	Candidate	FPv%	1	2	3	4
SNP	Adam McVey (incumbent)	36.16%	2,753			
Green	Chas Booth (incumbent)	22.26%	1,695	2,213		
Labour Co-op	Gordon John Munro (incumbent)	20.35%	1,549	1,690	1,821	2,106
Conservative	Paul Penman	15.93%	1,213	1,236	1,246	1,354
Liberal Democrats	Sanne Dijkstra-Downie	5.29%	403	448	552	
Electorate: 17,432 Valid: 7,613 Spoilt: 62 Quota: 1,904 Turnout: 7,675 (44.0%)

=== 2012 election ===
2012 City of Edinburgh Council election

2007 Council election: Leith - 3 seats
Party	Candidate	FPv%	Count						
Party	Candidate	FPv%	1	2	3	4	5	6	7
Labour	Gordon Munro (incumbent)	32.1%	2010						
Green	Chas Booth	18.9%	1181	1306	1331	1427	1780		
SNP	Adam McVey	17.6%	1104	1140	1145	1163	1228	1280	2240
SNP	Rob Munn (incumbent)	14.8%	926	984	993	1013	1135	1169	
Liberal Democrats	Marjorie Thomas (incumbent)	9.0%	565	618	641	825			
Conservative	Nicola Ross	6.5%	405	428	433				
Liberal	Irvine McMinn	1.1%	71	85					
Electorate: 16,972 Valid: 6262 Spoilt: 122 Quota: 1566 Turnout: 32.6%

=== 2007 election ===
2007 City of Edinburgh Council election

2007 Council election: Leith
Party	Candidate	FPv%	Count						
Party	Candidate	FPv%	1	2	3	4	5	6	7
SNP	Rob Munn	27.4	2,333						
Liberal Democrats	Marjorie Thomas	21.8	1,854	1,891.37	1,912.39	1,976.82	2,191.85		
Labour	Gordon Munro	18.1	1,544	1,569.18	1,586.49	1,617.60	1,694.31	1,705.06	2,243.18
Green	Chas Booth	11.2	957	1,010.38	1,090.54	1,132.27	1,205.39	1,238.08	1,325.58
Labour	Matthew Wilson	8.7	741	751.27	763.58	778.09	801.59	818.81	
Conservative	Andrew Robertson	7.1	604	614.37	616.18	632.39			
Liberal	Joseph Hill	2.4	208	224.62	234.93				
Scottish Socialist	Grzegorz J Rybak	1.8	150	169.14					
Electorate: 16,178 Valid: 8,391 Spoilt: 124 Quota: 2,098 Turnout: 52.6%
