= Inverleith (ward) =

Edinburgh ward

Location of the ward within Edinburgh

Inverleith is one of the seventeen wards used to elect members of the City of Edinburgh Council. Established in 2007 along with the other wards, it currently elects four Councillors.

It covers an area to the north-west of the city centre, with the northern boundary mostly on Ferry Road and much of the southern boundary formed by the Water of Leith (the main exception being the Stockbridge neighbourhood on its right bank), including Blackhall, Comely Bank, Craigleith, Dean Village, Drylaw, Inverleith, Orchard Brae and Warriston, as well as part of Canonmills which is split with the Leith Walk ward. Although its residential parts are mostly fairly compact and densely populated, the ward also includes several open areas, including the Royal Botanic Gardens Edinburgh, three cemeteries, a golf course and playing fields for numerous schools. A minor 2017 boundary change saw the loss of a residential area (between Roseburn Footpath and Stewart's Melville College) with a negligible effect on the population, which in 2019 was recorded at 34,236.

== Councillors ==
Election	Councillors			
2007	Stuart McIvor (SNP)	Tim McKay (Liberal Democrats)	Lesley Hinds (Labour)	Iain Whyte (Conservative)
2012	Gavin Barrie (SNP)	Nigel Bagshaw (Greens)	Lesley Hinds (Labour)	Iain Whyte (Conservative)
2017	Gavin Barrie (SNP)	Hal Osler (Liberal Democrats)	Max Mitchell (Conservative)	Iain Whyte (Conservative)
2022	Vicky Nicolson (SNP)	Hal Osler (Liberal Democrats)	Max Mitchell (Conservative)	Jule Bandel (Greens)

== Election results ==
=== 2022 election ===
Inverleith - 4 seats
Party	Candidate	FPv%	Count									
Party	Candidate	FPv%	1	2	3	4	5	6	7	8	9	10
Liberal Democrats	Hal Osler (incumbent)	23.2	3,117									
SNP	Vicky Nicolson	19.7	2,641	2,657	2,659	2,663	2,668	2,683	2,937			
Conservative	Max Mitchell (incumbent)	13.7	1,836	1,878	1,879	1,884	1,897	2,644	2,768			
Green	Jule Bandel	12.8	1,714	1,740	1,740	1,741	1,752	1,768	2,222	2,380	2,384	2,959
Labour	Mhairi Munro-Brian	12.6	1,684	1,713	1,715	1,721	1,736	1,755				
Liberal Democrats	Malcolm Alexander Wood	10.5	1,405	1,701	1,703	1,712	1,725	1,765	2,276	2,303	2,338	
Conservative	Stuart Herring	6.4	853	863	863	867	889					
Scottish Family	Phil Holden	0.7	96	97	98	109						
Scottish Libertarian	Tam Laird	0.4	53	54	54							
Independent	Stephen McNamara	0.1	17	17								
Electorate: 24,608 Valid: 13,416 Spoilt: 126 Quota: 2,684 Turnout: 55.0%

=== 2017 election ===
2017 City of Edinburgh Council election

Inverleith - 4 seats
Party	Candidate	FPv%	Count							
Party	Candidate	FPv%	1	2	3	4	5	6	7	8
Liberal Democrats	Hal Osler	16.59%	2,251	2,253	2,388	2,870				
Conservative	Max Mitchell	19.79%	2,685	2,691	2,707	2,840				
SNP	Gavin Barrie (incumbent)	18.96%	2,572	2,576	2,611	2,811				
Conservative	Iain Whyte (incumbent)	17.12%	2,323	2,325	2,371	2,411	2,459	2,571	2,573	3,103
Green	Nigel Bagshaw (incumbent)	12.30%	1,669	1,674	1,748	2,182	2,244	2,248	2,316	
Labour	James Dalgleish	12.39%	1,678	1,681	1,704					
Independent	Tina Woolnough	2.63%	357	362						
Scottish Libertarian	Tom Laird	0.24%	32							
Electorate: 24,275 Valid: 13,567 Spoilt: 147 Quota: 2,714 Turnout: 56.5%

On 23 April 2018, SNP councillor Gavin Barrie resigned from the party and became an Independent, after losing his position in the ruling administration as Economy Convener, following a vote at the SNP group AGM.

=== 2012 election ===
2012 City of Edinburgh Council election

Inverleith - 4 seats
Party	Candidate	FPv%	Count			
Party	Candidate	FPv%	1	2	3	4
Labour	Lesley Hinds (incumbent)	24.99%	2,751			
Conservative	Iain Whyte (incumbent)	17.77%	1,956	1,989	2,019	2,279
Green	Nigel Bagshaw	14.92%	1,642	1,815	1,865	2,325
SNP	Gavin Barrie	13.03%	1,434	1,489	2,148	2,264
Conservative	Scott Douglas	11.73%	1,291	1,312	1,326	1,487
Liberal Democrats	Tim McKay (incumbent)	10.38%	1,143	1,226	1,252	
SNP	John Young	7.19%	792	820		
Electorate: 23,235 Valid: 11,009 Spoilt: 118 (1.06%) Quota: 2,202 Turnout: 11,127 (47.9%)

=== 2007 election ===
2007 City of Edinburgh Council election

2007 Council election: Inverleith
Party	Candidate	FPv%	Count										
Party	Candidate	FPv%	1	2	3	4	5	6	7	8	9	10	11
Labour	Lesley A Hinds	18.2	2,689	2,706	2,714	2,724	2,743	2,904	3,025				
Conservative	Lindsay Paterson	14.1	2,085	2,087	2,089	2,102	2,114	2,166	2,284	2,288.52	2,411.12	2,449.96	
Conservative	Iain Whyte	13.5	1,986	1,986	1,988	1,999	1,999	2,022	2,346	2,349.91	2,465.52	2,498.29	4,277.64
SNP	Stuart McIvor	13.3	1,961	1,970	1,990	2,010	2,036	2,239	2,406	2,418.74	2,563.85	2,614.11	2,729.02
Liberal Democrats	Tim McKay	11.1	1,644	1,648	1,656	1,666	1,710	2,020	2,223	2,246.26	3,269.54		
Liberal Democrats	Tom Ponton	9.1	1,339	1,340	1,347	1,355	1,376	1,529	1,744	1,755.80			
Independent	Kristina Woolnough	9.0	1,323	1,324	1,329	1,364	1,367	1,449					
Green	Melanie A. M. Main	7.5	1,113	1,135	1,165	1,177	1,192						
Liberal	Seumas MacMhicean	1.0	148	151	151	162							
Independent	John Y. Anderson	0.9	129	131	134								
Solidarity	Raymond Watt	0.7	103	117									
Scottish Socialist	Sean H Donnelly	0.6	92										
Electorate: 22,903 Valid: 14,612 Spoilt: 138 Quota: 2,923 Turnout: 64.4%
