= Portobello/Craigmillar (ward) =

Electoral region for local council elections

Location of the ward within Edinburgh

Portobello/Craigmillar is one of the seventeen wards used to elect members of the City of Edinburgh Council. Established in 2007 along with the other wards, it elects four Councillors.

As its name suggests, the ward's territory is based around the communities of Craigmillar and Portobello in the east of the city's urban area up to the boundary with Musselburgh (East Lothian) and the coast on the Firth of Forth, also including the neighbourhoods of Bingham, Brunstane, Cleikimin, Eastfield, Greendykes, Joppa, Magdalene, Newcraighall and Niddrie. A minor boundary change in 2017 saw the addition of the western part of the Durham neighbourhood which, combined with housebuilding in the existing area (new and redeveloped), was sufficient to push the population over the threshold for a fourth councillor. In 2019, the ward had a population of 31,957.

== Councillors ==
Election	Councillors			
2007	Stephen I Hawkins (Liberal Democrats)	Maureen Child (Labour)	Michael A Bridgeman (SNP)	3 seats
2012	David Walker (Labour)	Maureen Child (Labour)	Michael A Bridgeman (SNP)	3 seats
2017	Mary Campbell (Greens)	Maureen Child (Labour)	Kate Campbell (SNP)	Callum Laidlaw (Conservative)
2022	Alys Mumford (Greens)	Jane Elizabeth Meagher (Labour)	Kate Campbell (SNP)	Tim Jones (Conservative)
2026	Alys Mumford (Greens)	Jane Elizabeth Meagher (Labour)	Lorenzo Martinico (Greens)	Tim Jones (Conservative)

== Election results ==
=== 2026 by-election ===
Portobello/Craigmillar by-election (3 September 2026) – 1 seat
Party	Candidate	FPv%	Count									
Party	Candidate	FPv%	1	2	3	4	5	6	7	8	9	10
Green	Lorenzo Martinico	28.0	1,781	1,786	1,788	1,810	1,825	1,872	1,890	1,920	2,652	3,341
SNP	Silas MacGilvray	24.1	1,531	1,533	1,537	1,555	1,567	1,609	1,631	1,681		
Labour	Jim Wyke	22.2	1,413	1,416	1,417	1,421	1,431	1,568	1,733	1,848	2,188	
Reform	Andrew McLaughlin	8.9	569	569	573	574	588	598	727			
Conservative	Haris Young	8.2	522	522	522	523	528	575				
Liberal Democrats	Liss Owen	5.7	365	365	366	372	372					
Scottish Family	Niel Deepnarain	1.1	73	74	77	80						
Workers Party	Pete Gregson	0.9	58	64	73							
ADF	David Ballantine	0.4	28	28								
Communist	Peter Olech	0.3	22									
Electorate: 28,062 Valid: 6,362 Spoilt: 65 Quota: 3,182 Turnout: 22.9%

=== 2022 election ===
Portobello/Craigmillar - 4 seats
Party	Candidate	FPv%	Count								
Party	Candidate	FPv%	1	2	3	4	5	6	7	8	9
SNP	Kate Campbell (incumbent)	30.7	3,438								
Labour	Jane Elizabeth Meagher	18.8	2,099	2,192	2,212	2,429					
Green	Alys Mumford	16.2	1,808	1,998	2,007	2,037	2,039	2,169	2,349		
Conservative	Tim Jones	15.3	1,712	1,729	1,743	1,776	1,777	1,869	1,986	1,990	2,290
SNP	Simon Clark Shedden	6.7	744	1,534	1,574	1,593	1,593	1,616	1,710	1,770	
Labour	Heather Pugh	5.2	578	597	607	629	638	774			
Liberal Democrats	Jill Reilly	4.3	480	488	495	527	528				
Independent	Andrew McDonald	1.6	182	197	221						
Alba	Anne Todd	1.3	142	149							
Electorate: 26,118 Valid: 11,183 Spoilt: 243 Quota: 2,237 Turnout: 43.7%

=== 2017 election ===
2017 City of Edinburgh Council election

Portobello/Craigmillar - 4 seats
Party	Candidate	FPv%	Count					
Party	Candidate	FPv%	1	2	3	4	5	6
Labour	Maureen Child (incumbent)	22.80%	2,378					
Conservative	Callum Laidlaw	19.48%	2,032	2,057	2,114			
SNP	Kate Campbell	16.96%	1,769	1,785	1,799	1,800	1,906	3,355
Green	Mary Campbell	15.10%	1,575	1,621	1,702	1,705	1,950	2,073
SNP	Mike Bridgman (incumbent)	15.60%	1,627	1,640	1,652	1,653	1,749	
Labour	David Walker (incumbent)	7.59%	792	941	1,001	1,010		
Liberal Democrats	Callum Leslie	2.47%	258	271				
Electorate: 22,360 Valid: 10,431 Spoilt: 223 Quota: 2,087 Turnout: 10,654 (47.6%)

=== 2012 election ===
2012 City of Edinburgh Council election

Portobello/Craigmillar - 3 seats
Party	Candidate	FPv%	Count							
Party	Candidate	FPv%	1	2	3	4	5	6	7	8
Labour	Maureen Child (incumbent)	36.6	2,645							
SNP	Michael A. Bridgeman (incumbent)	20.4	1,477	1,559	1,565	1,607	1,649	2,381		
SNP	David Manson	11.6	837	879	891	921	953			
Labour	David Walker	10.8	784	1,212	1,237	1,270	1,319	1,356	1,431	1,744
Green	Peter McColl	8.5	615	723	768	825	974	1,059	1,203	
Conservative	Henry Christian	7.2	523	549	574	601				
Independent	Norrie Davies	2.9	213	253	261					
Liberal Democrats	Martin Veart	1.9	137	155						
Electorate: 17,603 Valid: 7,231 Spoilt: 169 (2.28%) Quota: 1,808 Turnout: 7,400 (42%)

=== 2007 election ===
2007 City of Edinburgh Council election

2007 Council election: Portobello/Craigmillar
Party	Candidate	FPv%	Count													
Party	Candidate	FPv%	1	2	3	4	5	6	7	8	9	10	11	12	13	14
SNP	Michael A Bridgeman	28.0	3,471													
Labour	Maureen Child	21.9	2,076	2,125.94	2,125.94	2127.94	2,138.44	2,158.45	2,189.70	2,227.08	2,295.83	2,337.97				
Conservative	Alison Miller	11.0	1,041	1,057.31	1,058.69	1,058.69	1,061.44	1,068.82	1,072.45	1,089.45	1,102.83	1,156.59	1,157.08	1,202.78	1,262.92	
Labour	Lawrence Marshall	8.9	849	857.91	857.91	858.91	862.28	867.79	880.42	900.42	935.80	958.30	967.58	1,100.53		
Liberal Democrats	Stephen I. Hawkins	8.3	791	817.98	817.98	817.98	820.98	857.87	875.25	910.76	923.76	1,006.27	1,007.97	1,290.09	1,481.76	1,850.76
Green	Peter McColl	6.7	635	668.63	668.63	668.63	693.01	701.89	762.80	803.30	827.56	885.08	886.40			
Independent	Norrie Davies	3.2	302	316.30	316.43	317.81	320.18	325.68	342.81	367.32						
Independent	Archie Burns	3.1	291	306.56	307.93	310.19	311.31	315.94	332.70	376.83	415.09					
Independent	Margaret Munro	2.6	244	251.40	251.65	257.78	260.41	262.91	268.41							
Solidarity	Caroline J. Hosking	2.0	187	214.35	214.73	214.85	231.61	238.62								
Liberal	Massimo Circi	1.2	114	131.94	131.94	131.94	133.07									
Scottish Socialist	Jan Moran	0.8	73	81.91	82.03	82.03										
Independent	John Smart	0.2	19	20.13	20.13											
Independent	Gerry Kerr	0.1	5	7.001												
Electorate: 17,404 Valid: 9,281 Spoilt: 206 Quota: 2,321 Turnout: 54.5%
