= Southside/Newington (ward) =

Edinburgh city council ward

Location of the ward within Edinburgh

Southside/Newington is one of the seventeen wards used to elect members of the City of Edinburgh Council. Established in 2007 along with the other wards, it elects four Councillors. As its name suggests, the ward's territory to the south-east of the city centre is based around the communities of Newington and the South Side (defined as the area south of Drummond Street between the Meadows and Salisbury Crags, bisected by Clerk Street), also including Blackford, Cameron Toll, The Grange, Mayfield, Prestonfield and Sciennes.

A minor 2017 boundary change saw the loss of Dumbiedykes in the north of the ward and the addition of Nether Liberton village in the south. In 2019, the ward had a population of 37,696.

== Councillors ==
Election	Councillors			
2007	Gordon Mackenzie (Liberal Democrats)	Ian Perry (Labour)	Steve Burgess (Greens)	Cameron Rose (Conservative)
2012	Jim Orr (SNP)	Ian Perry (Labour)	Steve Burgess (Greens)	Cameron Rose (Conservative)
2017	Alison Dickie (SNP)	Ian Perry (Labour)	Steve Burgess (Greens)	Cameron Rose (Conservative)
2022	Simita Kumar (SNP)	Tim Pogson (Labour)	Steve Burgess (Greens)	Pauline Flannery (Liberal Democrats)
2026	Ruth Elliott (Labour)	Tim Pogson (Labour)	Steve Burgess (Greens)	Pauline Flannery (Liberal Democrats)

== Election results ==
=== 2026 by-election ===
Southside/Newington by-election (3 September 2026) – 1 seat
Party	Candidate	FPv%	Count												
Party	Candidate	FPv%	1	2	3	4	5	6	7	8	9	10	11	12	13
Labour	Ruth Elliott	32.1	2,153	2,156	2,159	2,160	2,167	2,171	2,187	2,210	2,238	2,498	2,693	3,030	4,350
Green	Isabella Gastel Alejandre	29.5	1,978	1,978	1,978	1,979	1,982	2,007	2,020	2,037	2,043	2,119	2,486	2,505	
SNP	Sam MacKenzie	11.3	757	757	757	758	759	760	766	771	787	828			
Conservative	Nick Layden	10.7	717	717	717	719	727	728	733	743	872	948	968		
Liberal Democrats	Artie Khovanov	8.1	543	543	544	546	549	550	556	565	573				
Reform	Gary Neill	4.5	305	305	305	306	308	309	310	315					
Edinburgh and East Lothian People's Party	Marc Wilkinson	1.1	78	81	83	84	85	88	94						
Independent	Roisin Keirdashian	0.9	63	63	63	63	65	71							
Communist	Richard Shillcock	0.7	46	46	47	48	50								
Scottish Family	Richard Lucas	0.6	38	38	38	39									
ADF	Sean Moffat	0.2	12	12	13										
Edinburgh and East Lothian People's Party	Derrick Emms	0.1	9	9											
Edinburgh and East Lothian People's Party	Mark Rowbotham	0.1	7												
Electorate: 24,666 Valid: 6,706 Spoilt: 35 Quota: 3,354 Turnout: 27.3%

=== 2022 election ===
Southside/Newington - 4 seats
Party	Candidate	FPv%	Count				
Party	Candidate	FPv%	1	2	3	4	5
Labour	Tim Pogson	24.1	2,837				
Green	Steve Burgess (incumbent)	23.0	2,717				
SNP	Simita Kumar	19.2	2,260	2,338	2,557		
Conservative	Cameron Rose (incumbent)	17.6	2,077	2,139	2,146	2,154	
Liberal Democrats	Pauline Flannery	16.1	1,897	2,141	2,236	2,331	3,739
Electorate: 24,152 Valid: 11,788 Spoilt: 96 Quota: 2,358 Turnout: 49.2%

=== 2017 election ===
2017 City of Edinburgh Council election

Southside/Newington - 4 seats
Party	Candidate	FPv%	Count
Party	Candidate	FPv%	1
Conservative	Cameron Rose (incumbent)	26.93%	3,151
SNP	Alison Dickie	20.54%	2,403
Green	Steve Burgess (incumbent)	20.35%	2,381
Labour	Ian Perry (incumbent)	20.12%	2,354
Liberal Democrats	Dan Farthing	12.05%	1,410
Electorate: 22,338 Valid: 11,699 Spoilt: 73 Quota: 2,340 Turnout: 11,772 (52.7%)

=== 2012 election ===
2012 City of Edinburgh Council election

Southside/Newington - 4 seats
Party	Candidate	FPv%	Count							
Party	Candidate	FPv%	1	2	3	4	5	6	7	8
Green	Steve Burgess (incumbent)	19.97%	1,869	1,883						
Labour	Ian Perry (incumbent)	19.78%	1,851	1,856	1,858	1,886				
SNP	Jim Orr	18.34%	1,717	1,723	1,725	1,742	1,744	1,886		
Conservative	Cameron Rose (incumbent)	16.72%	1,565	1,568	1,568	1,570	1,571	1,855	1,857	2,501
Liberal Democrats	Gordon MacKenzie (incumbent)	13.97%	1,308	1,341	1,343	1,348	1,351	1,548	1,551	
Independent	Gordon Murdie	9.53%	892	895	896	921	923			
TUSC	William Black	0.93%	87	90	91					
Liberal	Margaret Lea	0.76%	71							
Electorate: 20,821 Valid: 9,360 Spoilt: 67 (0.71%) Quota: 1,873 Turnout: 9,427 (45.3%)

On 1 March 2014, SNP councillor Jim Orr resigned from the party and became an Independent citing disillusionment with internal political spats. He retired prior to the next election.

=== 2007 election ===
2007 City of Edinburgh Council election

2007 Council election: Southside/Newington
Party	Candidate	FPv%	Count							
Party	Candidate	FPv%	1	2	3	4	5	6	7	8
Labour	Ian Perry	18.6	2,530	2,537	2,548	2,554	2,568	2,763		
Conservative	Cameron Rose	18.5	2,516	2,529	2,531	2,546	2,551	2,686	2,691.32	2,835.77
Liberal Democrats	Gordon Mackenzie	17.0	2,304	2,309	2,315	2,356	2,378	2,670	2,681.66	4,168.10
Green	Steve Burgess	14.1	1,920	1,935	1,961	1,974	2,062	2,610	2,623.58	2,893.41
Liberal Democrats	Liz O' Malley	14.0	1,907	1,913	1,917	1,939	1,945	2,087	2,097.96	
SNP	Susanna Lacey	13.1	1,780	1,790	1,824	1,845	1,876			
Scottish Socialist	Scott Simpson	1.1	146	150	183	189				
Liberal	Margaret Lea	1.1	144	148	156					
Solidarity	James C. Allinson	1.0	140	142						
Independent	George E. Pitcher	0.6	81							
Electorate: 23,620 Valid: 13,468 Spoilt: 121 Quota: 2,694 Turnout: 57.5%
