= Stefan Tymkewycz =

Scottish politician (born 1959)

Cllr Stefan Tymkewycz

Member of the Scottish Parliament for Lothians (1 of 7 Regional MSPs)
- In office 3 May 2007 – 31 August 2007

Personal details
- Born: 18 September 1959 (age 66) Edinburgh, Scotland
- Party: Scottish National Party

Stefan Tymkewycz (born 18 September 1959) is a Scottish National Party (SNP) politician, and a former Member of the Scottish Parliament (MSP) for the Lothians region.

== Political career ==
Tymkewycz was elected as an MSP at the 2007 Scottish Parliament election for the Lothians region. Tymkewycz was also elected as councillor for Craigentinny/Duddingston ward on the City of Edinburgh Council at the 2007 City of Edinburgh Council election. Both elections were held on the same day. As a result of being elected to both bodies, he agreed not to take his allowance for that job while he was an MSP.

In August 2007 he announced that he was to step down as an MSP to concentrate on being an Edinburgh councillor and was replaced by Shirley-Anne Somerville in the Scottish Parliament on 31 August 2007. Tymkewycz stood down as councillor in 2017.

== Personal life ==
Tymkewycz was formerly a police officer before being elected. He now runs his own property business in Edinburgh.

His father Bohdan Tymkewycz was a member of the 14th Waffen SS Galizien Division during World War II and was a Prisoner of War stationed in Scotland and remained in the country after his release.
