= Corstorphine/Murrayfield (ward) =

Electoral ward in Edinburgh, Scotland

Location of the ward within Edinburgh

Corstorphine/Murrayfield is one of the seventeen wards used to elect members of the City of Edinburgh Council. Established in 2007 along with the other wards, it currently elects three Councillors.

As its name suggests, the ward's territory is based around the suburban communities of Corstorphine and Murrayfield in the west of the city, also including Balgreen, Broomhall, Carrick Knowe, Ravelston and Roseburn, Saughtonhall, with four large open areas comprising two golf courses, Edinburgh Zoo and the playing fields surrounding Murrayfield Stadium. A minor boundary change in 2017 saw the loss of the Forrester and West Coates neighbourhoods but the addition of Wester Broom and Orchard Brae South (between Roseburn Footpath and Stewart's Melville College) – there was a slight increase in the population, which in 2019 stood at 24,192.

== Councillors ==
Election	Councillors		
2007	Paul Edie (Liberal Democrats)	Phil Wheeler (Liberal Democrats)	Jeremy Balfour (Conservative)
2012	Paul Edie (Liberal Democrats)	Frank Ross (SNP)	Jeremy Balfour (Conservative)
2017	Gillian Gloyer (Liberal Democrats)	Frank Ross (SNP)	Scott Douglas (Conservative)
2022	Alan Christopher Beal (Liberal Democrats)	Frank Ross (SNP)	Euan Robert Davidson (Liberal Democrats)
2023 by-election	Alan Christopher Beal (Liberal Democrats)	Fiona Bennett (Liberal Democrats)	Euan Robert Davidson (Liberal Democrats)

== Election results ==
=== 2023 by-election ===
Corstorphine/Murrayfield by-election (9 March 2023) – 1 seat
Party	Candidate	FPv%	Count
Party	Candidate	FPv%	1
Liberal Democrats	Fiona Bennett	56.0	4,577
SNP	Donald Rutherford	13.3	1,086
Conservative	Hugh Findlay	9.6	788
Labour	Richard Parker	7.0	568
Green	Chris Young	5.1	417
Independent	Elaine Miller	3.7	327
Independent	Pete Gregson	3.6	295
Scottish Family	Richard Fettes	1.1	90
Scottish Libertarian	Gary Smith	0.2	20
Electorate: 19,435 Valid: 8,168 Spoilt: 57 Quota: 4,085 Turnout: 42.3%

=== 2022 election ===
Corstorphine/Murrayfield - 3 seats
Party	Candidate	FPv%	Count					
Party	Candidate	FPv%	1	2	3	4	5	6
Liberal Democrats	Alan Christopher Beal	34.2	3,897					
SNP	Frank Ross (incumbent)	18.7	2,132	2,152	2,163	2,567	2,570	2,941
Conservative	Hugh Findlay	16.0	1,818	1,856	1,878	1,894	1,905	2,015
Liberal Democrats	Euan Robert Davidson	15.6	1,772	2,691	2,716	2,883		
Labour	Richard Parker	7.8	893	918	928	1,090	1,099	
Green	Connal Hughes	6.9	784	804	810			
Scottish Family	Norman David Colville	0.8	88	94				
Electorate: 19,533 Valid: 11,384 Spoilt: 108 Quota: 2,847 Turnout: 58.8%

=== 2017 election ===
2017 City of Edinburgh Council election

Corstorphine/Murrayfield - 3 seats
Party	Candidate	FPv%	Count					
Party	Candidate	FPv%	1	2	3	4	5	6
Conservative	Scott Douglas	33.41%	3,819					
Liberal Democrats	Gillian Gloyer	30.64%	3,502					
SNP	Frank Ross (incumbent)	21.65%	2,474	2,503	2,566	2,577	2,680	2,956
Labour	June Whitelaw	7.68%	878	1,089	1,289	1,316	1,386	1,633
Green	Kate Nevens	5.23%	598	670	780	792	852	
Independent	John Ferguson Scott	0.80%	92	221	281	316		
UKIP	James Nisbet	0.58%	66	150	165			
Electorate: 19,328 Valid: 11,429 Spoilt: 101 Quota: 2,858 Turnout: 11,530 (59.7%)

=== 2012 election ===
2012 City of Edinburgh Council election

Corstorphine/Murrayfield - 3 seats
Party	Candidate	FPv%	Count					
Party	Candidate	FPv%	1	2	3	4	5	6
Conservative	Jeremy Balfour (incumbent)	24.96%	2,050	2,100				
SNP	Frank Ross	24.74%	2,032	2,053	2,056			
Liberal Democrats	Paul Edie (incumbent)	21.77%	1,788	1,798	1,817	1,818	1,993	2,798
Labour	Tom McInally	20.45%	1,679	1,698	1,702	1,702	1,884	
Green	Dominic Hinde	6.11%	502	526	530	530		
UKIP	James Nisbet	1.96%	161					
Electorate: 17,445 Valid: 8,212 Spoilt: 56 (0.68%) Quota: 2,054 Turnout: 8,268 (47.4%)

=== 2007 election ===
2007 City of Edinburgh Council election

2007 Council election: Corstorphine/Murrayfield
Party	Candidate	FPv%	Count						
Party	Candidate	FPv%	1	2	3	4	5	6	7
Conservative	Jeremy Balfour	25.7	2,972						
Liberal Democrats	Paul Edie	21.1	2,444	2,474.88	2,481.88	2,633.48	3,046.01		
Liberal Democrats	Phil Wheeler	16.6	1,915	1,927.83	1,936.87	2,054.48	2,459.35	2,578.54	3,536.57
Labour	Daniel Donaldson	15.2	1,757	1,762.90	1,773.90	1,863.38	2,136.86	2,164.33	
SNP	Robin J. A. MacCormick	14.9	1,727	1,734.77	1,750.92	1,852.76			
Green	Charles Kennedy	4.8	556	565.68	582.75				
Scottish Socialist	Andrew Weir	0.7	80	80.29					
Electorate: 17,531 Valid: 11,451 Spoilt: 119 Quota: 2,863 Turnout: 66.0%
