= Steve Cardownie =

Scottish politician

Steve Cardownie is a Scottish National Party (SNP) politician and former Deputy Lord Provost of the City of Edinburgh Council where he was a councillor for the Forth ward.

== Political career ==
Cardownie was a Socialist Workers Party member before he joined the Scottish Labour Party in 1983.

He was first elected as a Labour councillor in 1988. He held a number of positions within the party in Edinburgh including Group Secretary, Whip and Deputy Lord Provost. He was also involved in the trade union movement serving on the national executive of the Civil and Public Services Association (CPSA).

In late October 2005 he resigned from the Labour Party and joined the SNP. He said he had come to the conclusion that independence was in Scotland's interests and that Tony Blair's policies no longer represented the Labour Party he had joined. He found himself ostracised by his former colleagues.

He would be the sole SNP councillor on City of Edinburgh Council until the 2007 Scottish local elections. He was elected in the Forth ward under the new proportional representation system topping the poll with 2,472 first preferences and exceeding the quota. After the elections the Scottish Liberal Democrats formed a coalition with the SNP to run the Council and Cardownie became Deputy Leader.

He was re-selected as a candidate for the 2012 Scottish local elections again in the Forth ward this time with a running-mate. He polled 1,377 first preferences and took the third seat in the ward exceeding the quota. After the elections he was re-elected Leader of an enlarged SNP group and he again became Deputy Leader of the City of Edinburgh Council as the Scottish Labour Party and the SNP formed a grand-coalition after the election. In March 2015 he stood down as leader of the SNP group.

In May 2015 he became the Deputy Lord Provost. In September 2016 he announced that he would not seek re-election to the council in 2017.

In April 2021 he announced his support for the new Alba Party.
