= Solidarity (Scotland) =

Solidarity Scotland's Socialist Movement
- Leader: Tommy Sheridan (final leader)
- Founded: 2006
- Dissolved: 2021
- Split from: Scottish Socialist Party
- Merged into: Alba Party
- Headquarters: 36 Chestnut Crescent; East Kilbride; G75 9EL
- Ideology: Socialism; Scottish independence; Scottish republicanism; Euroscepticism
- Political position: Left-wing to far-left
- National affiliation: Trade Unionist and Socialist Coalition; No2EU (2009)
- Colours: Red, Green, White

Solidarity – Scotland's Socialist Movement was a political party in Scotland. The party launched on 3 September 2006, founded by two former Scottish Socialist Party MSPs, Tommy Sheridan and Rosemary Byrne, in the aftermath of Sheridan's libel action.

On 23 December 2010, Sheridan was convicted of perjury during the 2006 defamation action, and sentenced to three years imprisonment on 26 January 2011. Solidarity performed poorly in the 2011 Scottish Parliament election, achieving only 2,837 votes or 0.14% of the overall regional list vote.

Solidarity formally ended its existence as a political party in December 2021, giving its support to the Alba Party instead.

== History ==
The Scottish Socialist Party returned six MSPs in the 2003 Scottish Parliament election. At the end of August 2006, the SSP's leader Tommy Sheridan and Rosemary Byrne, a SSP MSP for South of Scotland led a breakaway. Solidarity launched on 3 September with 600 people attending the first meeting in Glasgow. Most SSP members and branches in the Highlands and Islands defected to the new party, while the Shetland membership voted unanimously to stay in the SSP. 250 people attended the founding conference on Saturday 5 November 2006.

The new party was backed by the Socialist Workers Party and Socialist Party Scotland (part of the Committee for a Workers' International). The two groups clashed at the first Solidarity conference on the political orientation of the party. After a close vote the interim title of "Solidarity – Scotland's Socialist Movement" was adopted as the name of the party, and Rosemary Byrne and Tommy Sheridan were unanimously endorsed as co-convenors.

The party failed to win any seats in the 2007 Scottish Parliament election. The party won one council seat in Glasgow in local elections, with Ruth Black taking the Craigton seat, then subsequently defected to Labour in December 2007 after Sheridan was charged with perjury. They fielded a candidate in the 2008 Glasgow East by-election who came sixth.

In March 2009 Solidarity joined No to EU – Yes to Democracy, a left-wing eurosceptic coalition for the 2009 European Parliament elections, which received 9,693 votes (0.9%) in Scotland. Sheridan stood for election to Westminster in 2010 under the Trade Unionist and Socialist Coalition banner, winning 931 votes (2.9%) in Glasgow South West and losing his deposit.

Ahead of the 2011 Scottish Parliament election Solidarity explored the possibility of coalition with George Galloway. In January Galloway had announced his intention to stand for Holyrood after failing to gain a seat at Westminster as a Respect party candidate in the May 2010 election. Solidarity did not field a candidate in the Glasgow region, lending support to Galloway, who stood as the Respect Party candidate. Solidarity performed poorly with a result of only 2,837 votes, or 0.14% of the regional vote, and won no seats in the Scottish Parliament. The party's issues were compounded when Solidarity leader Tommy Sheridan was convicted of perjury following a 12-week-long court case at the High Court in Glasgow, and was sentenced to three years' imprisonment on 26 January 2011. He was released in early 2012.

At the start of 2015 Solidarity faced its own split as Socialist Party Scotland withdrew its support for the party and said that Sheridan had moved to the right.

The party registered the name Hope Over Fear for the 2016 Scottish Parliament election. Solidarity fielded 40 candidates across Scotland's eight regional lists for the 2016 election. At the 2016 elections the party received 14,333 votes (0.6% of the electorate) across all the regions and returned none of their candidates. However they gained the largest number of votes among the left wing parties in Scotland making them the third most supported pro-independence party in Scotland behind the SNP and the Scottish Green Party.

In June 2016 Sheridan resigned from his position as co-convener of the Solidarity, and Councillor Pat Lee elected to replace him alongside Byrne.

The party campaigned in favour of the United Kingdom leaving the European Union during the 2016 referendum.

Solidarity had one elected official in Scotland: Councillor Pat Lee in South Lanarkshire. Lee was elected as an SNP councillor and defected to Solidarity in May 2015. Solidarity has been accused of using entryist tactics in North Lanarkshire, with it being claimed that activists close to the party have infiltrated SNP branches in the area.

Solidarity's split from the SSP was beset by a number of controversies. In the immediate aftermath of Solidarity's launch members of the SSP claimed that a transfer of funds from the account of the regional SSP to Solidarity was fraudulent. In Autumn 2006, the Industrial Workers of the World alleged that Sheridan and Byrne betrayed workers by ignoring their right of consultation about the impending redundancy of parliamentary staff, and unilaterally removing funding from the collective body which employed parliamentary staff.

In March 2016 several leading activists left the party, citing its failure to adequately respond to members' reports of bullying and harassment. Solidarity announced that Park would be bringing a defamation case against The National in relation to these allegations.

On 19 November 2021, it was announced that Solidarity members would be asked to deregister the party and help build the newly formed Alba Party. Members endorsed this at their 2021 conference.

== Electoral performance ==
=== Scottish Parliament ===
2007	31,066	1.5 (#8)	0 / 129	▼2
2011	2,837	0.1 (#16)	0 / 129	0
2016	14,333	0.6 (#7)	0 / 129	0

=== Scottish councils ===
2007	17,670	0.8	1 / 1,222	
2012	787	0.05 (#19)	0 / 1,223	▼1
2017	883	0.05 (#15)	0 / 1,227	Steady

== See also ==
- Scottish Socialist Party
- Alba Party
- Socialist Party Scotland
- Socialist Workers Party (Britain)
- Trade Unionist and Socialist Coalition
- No to EU – Yes to Democracy
- Politics of Scotland
- List of political parties in Scotland
