= Hills in Edinburgh =

Folkish geographic identifier of Edinburgh

Salisbury Crags, with Arthur's Seat behind

Edinburgh, the capital of Scotland, is traditionally said to have been "built on Seven Hills", in an allusion to the seven hills of Rome. While there is considerable room for debate as to which hills are included and excluded from the seven, seven possibilities are listed in an old rhyme: (Note: Abbey, Calton, Castle grand, Southward see St Leonards stand, St Johns and Sciennes as two are given, And Multrees makes Seven.)

The Pentland Hills are also just to the south of the city, and their lower slopes are within the city boundary, especially around Hillend, Swanston and Balerno. Some of the hills are formed from dead volcanoes that last erupted 400 million years ago, and all show the effect of glaciation.

The tale of the seven hills of Edinburgh is popular enough that several local business take their name from it, including a dentist, a tour company, and a cèilidh band.

== Traditional Seven ==
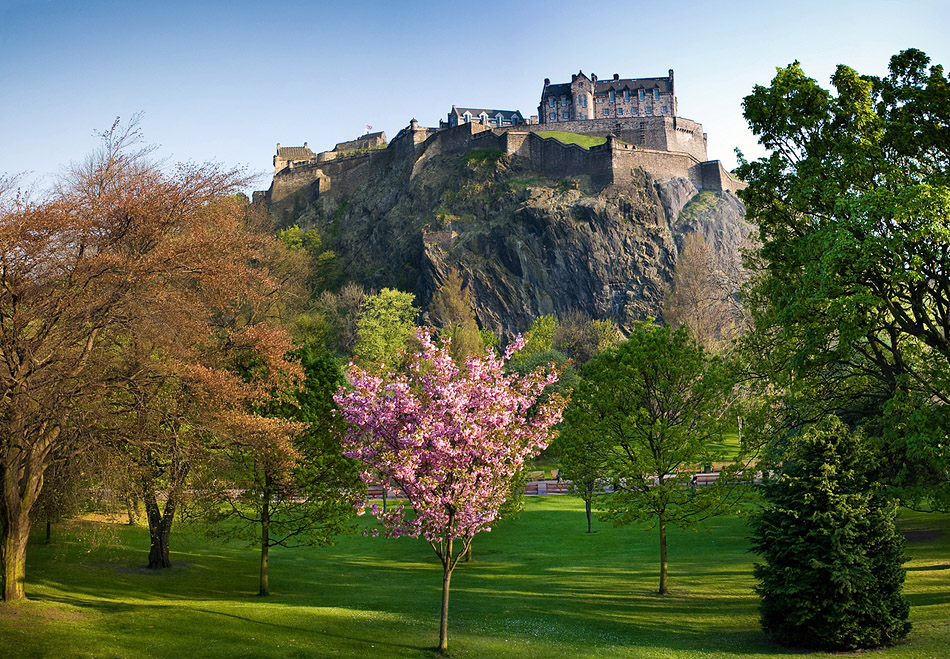
The Castle Rock, perhaps Edinburgh's best known hill

There is some argument as to which the seven are. Arthur's Seat and the Braid Hills, for example, are ranges of hill, containing several summits, rather than just one. In total, there are ten summits with a prominence of at least 30 metres (98 ft).

- Arthur's Seat (height 251m, prominence 174m) at 55°56′39.76″N 3°9′41.08″W The highest of the seven, an ancient volcano incorporating Salisbury Crags (174m, 65m), Dunsapie Hill (145m, 34m) and several other smaller hills.
- Castle Rock — a volcanic plug (128m, 60m) at 55°56′57.80″N 3°12′1.62″W
- Calton Hill (103m, 46m) at 55°57′20.23″N 3°10′58.10″W
- Corstorphine Hill — a ridge (162m, 117m) at 55°57′7.33″N 3°16′21.58″W
- Braid Hills (213m, 51m) at 55°54′44.84″N 3°12′14.0″W
- Blackford Hill (164m, 63m) at 55°55′25.83″N 3°11′39.16″W
- Craiglockhart Hill at55°55′6.27″N 3°14′9.59″W

A running race, held yearly since 1980, takes in these seven hills, starting and finishing at Calton Hill (although it actually excludes Wester Craiglockhart because it is private property, and instead includes the lower Easter Craiglockhart).

== Debate over 'The Seven' ==
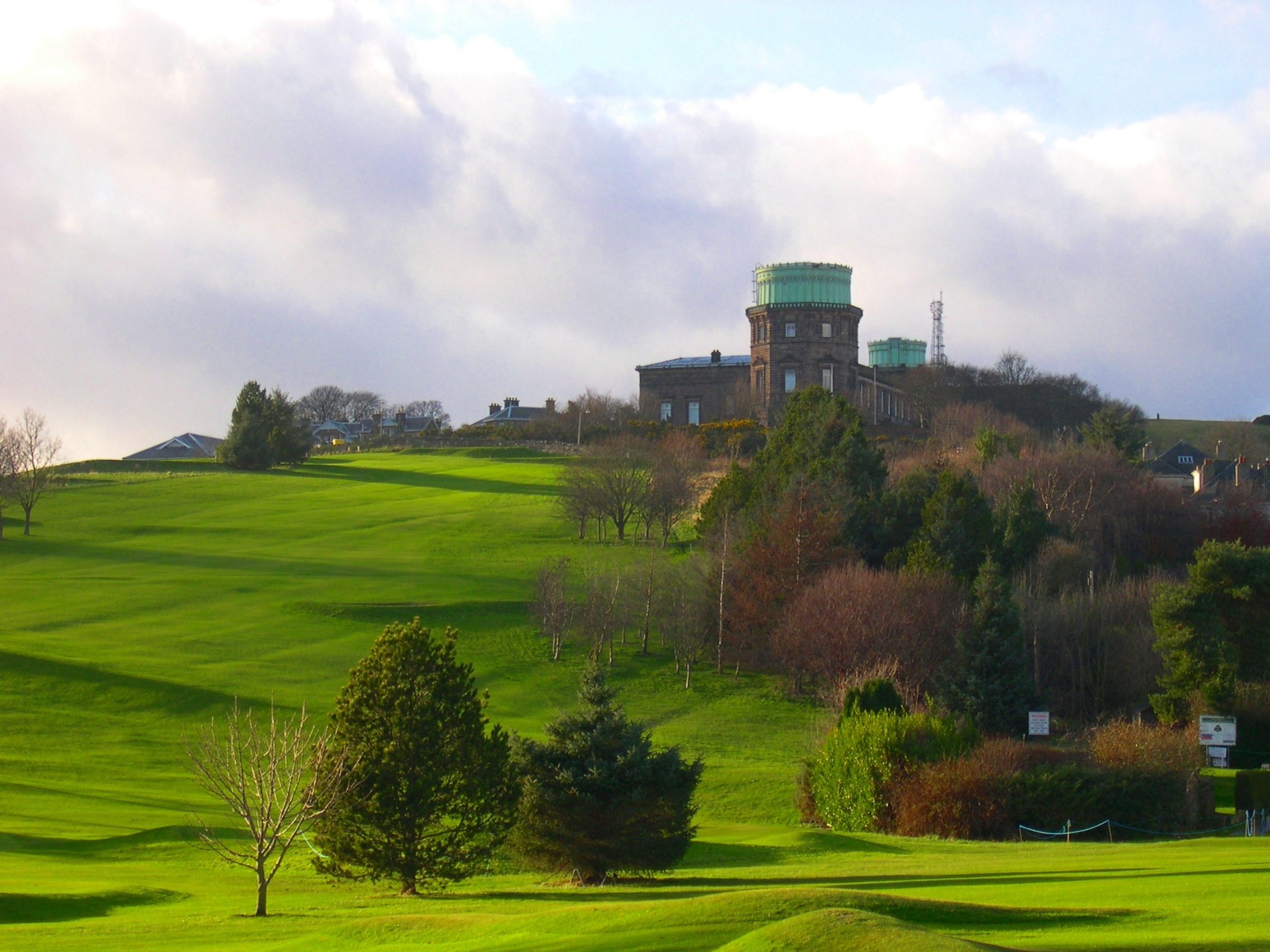
The Royal Observatory atop Blackford Hill

Before the construction of the New Town, Edinburgh was built on a single hill, the volcanic Castle Rock and its tail that extended to the east. The building of the New Town and subsequent development in the 19th and 20th centuries saw first Calton Hill and later all of the others listed above being absorbed into the city, and the "traditional seven" have some claim to being described as the seven principal hills within the modern boundaries of Edinburgh.

There are many other hills in Edinburgh, some part of the above ranges, or simply hidden beneath housing etc. There are for example, ridges extending from Dalry and Ardmillan, and also Sighthill. Craigmillar Castle is also on top of a small hill, and there is another small one underneath Colinton. There are also hills beneath the New Town, and the Old Town to the south of the Cowgate. Some of these hills rise to heights substantially above the traditional seven — for example parts of Fairmilehead at 183 metres (600 ft).

The Pentland Hills to the south of Edinburgh are traditionally thought of as being outside the city, although they are very close, and because of their height they dominate views to the south of the city. Allermuir Hill at 493m is only slightly further from the centre of Edinburgh than Corstorphine Hill, and is almost twice the height of Arthur's Seat.

A number of Edinburgh suburbs, also contain "hill" or synonyms in their name — Abbeyhill, Alnwickhill, Church Hill, Curriehill, Drylaw (Lowland Scots for a "hill without a spring"), Ferniehill, Firrhill, Greenhill, Piershill, Sighthill; and others also contain the element "Craig" meaning a large rock, such as Craigentinny and Craigmillar.

== Hills in the centre of the city ==
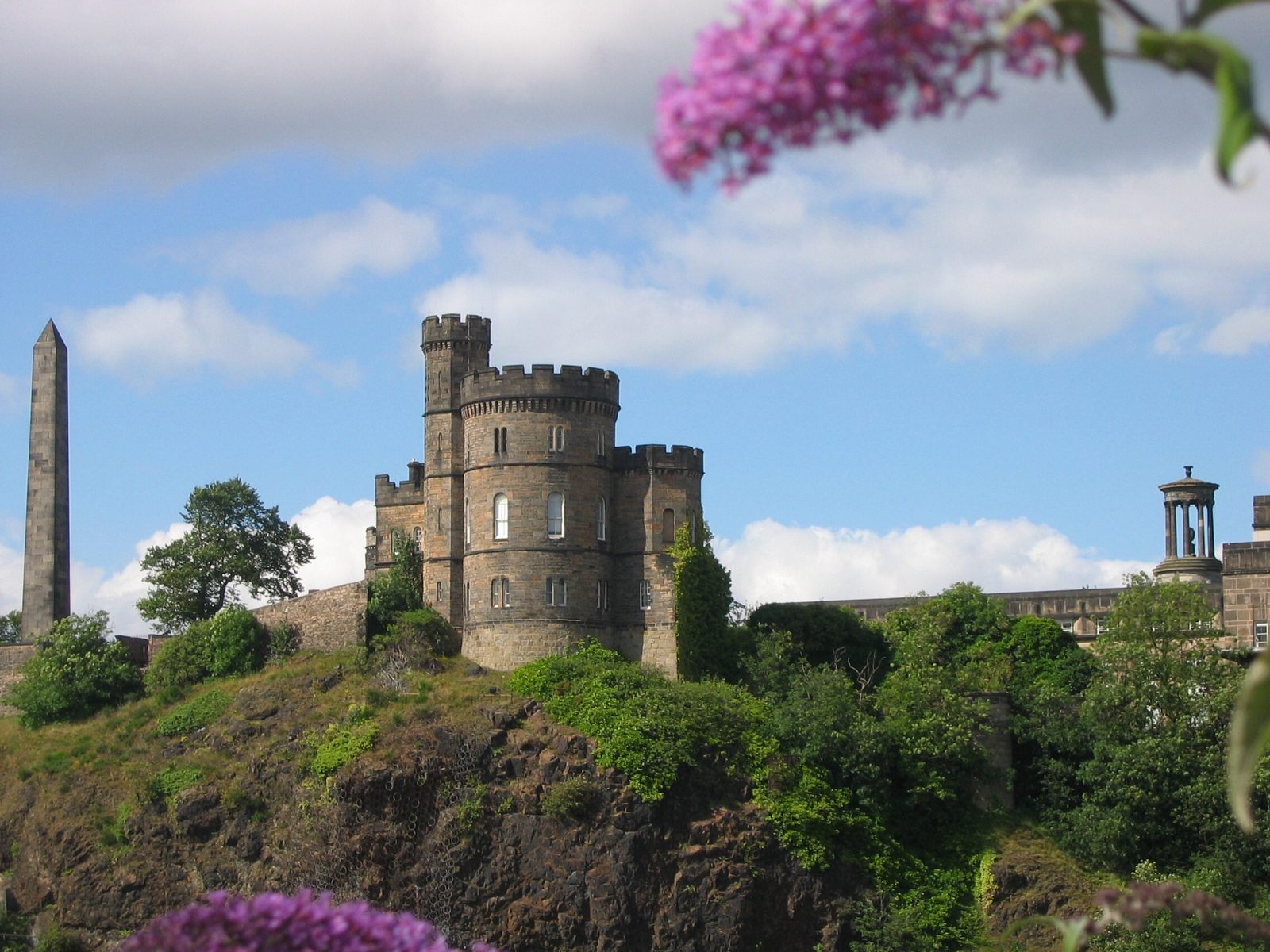
The Governor's House on Calton Hill

Edinburgh is also traditionally thought of as being a hilly city, because of the number of hills in or close to the city centre. Chief among these is the Royal Mile which rises continuously from Holyrood House to Edinburgh Castle for approximately a mile. Others include -

- Dundas Street and Hanover Street, which rise steeply from the Water of Leith to a summit at George Street, then descend slightly to Princes Street, before climbing the very steep Mound to join the Royal Mile
- Several streets in the New Town which run parallel to Dundas Street and Hanover Street for part of their length, including Frederick Street and Castle Street
- Leith Walk, which rises continuously from just above sea level at Leith, to a summit at Princes Street.
- A number of short and very steep streets in the Old Town, including Victoria Street, Candlemaker Row, and Infirmary Street.

The many height changes have led to several roads crossing other roads on bridges, which was relatively rare in pre-20th century Britain. These include Waterloo Place above Calton Road, George IV Bridge over the Cowgate and Merchant Street, South Bridge over the Cowgate, and King's Bridge carrying Johnston Terrace over Kings Stables Road. There are also several staircases accessible to pedestrians only, linking streets at different heights, including Playfair Steps between Market Street and Princes Street, Jacob's Ladder between Calton Road and Regent Road, and the News Steps, between St Giles Street and Market Street.

Outlying hills include the climb from Tollcross to Bruntsfield and beyond Morningside to Fairmilehead, and Liberton Brae.
