= List of schools in Edinburgh =

List of schools in Edinburgh is a list of schools in the City of Edinburgh council area of Scotland. It lists schools both within Edinburgh itself, and in outlying villages within the local government boundary.

== State schools ==
=== Primary schools ===
==== Within Edinburgh ====
- Abbeyhill Primary School
- Balgreen Primary School
- Blackhall Primary School
- Bonaly Primary School
- Broomhouse Primary School
- Broughton Primary School
- Brunstane Primary School
- Bruntsfield Primary School
- Buckstone Primary School
- Bun-sgoil Taobh na Pàirce
- Canaan Lane Primary School
- Canal View Primary School
- Carrick Knowe Primary School
- Castleview Primary School
- Clermiston Primary School
- Clovenstone Primary School
- Colinton Primary School
- Corstorphine Primary School
- Craigentinny Primary School
- Craiglockhart Primary School
- Craigour Park Primary School
- Craigroyston Primary School
- Cramond Primary School
- Dalry Primary School
- Davidson's Mains Primary School
- Duddingston Primary School
- East Craigs Primary School
- Ferryhill Primary School
- Flora Stevenson Primary School
- Forthview Primary School
- Fox Covert Primary School
- Frogston Primary School
- Gilmerton Primary School
- Gracemount Primary School
- Granton Primary School
- Gylemuir Primary School
- Hermitage Park Primary School
- Holy Cross RC Primary School, Newhaven
- James Gillespie's Primary School
- Juniper Green Primary School
- Leith Primary School
- Leith Walk Primary School
- Liberton Primary School
- Longstone Primary School
- Lorne Primary School
- Maybury Primary School
- Murrayburn Primary School
- Niddrie Mill Primary School
- Oxgangs Primary School
- Parsons Green Primary School
- Pentland Primary School
- Pirniehall Primary School
- Preston Street Primary School
- Prestonfield Primary School
- Roseburn Primary School
- The Royal High Primary School
- Royal Mile Primary School
- Sciennes Primary School
- Sighthill Primary School
- South Morningside Primary School
- St Andrew's Fox Covert RC Primary, Corstorphine
- St Catherine's RC Primary School, Liberton
- St Cuthbert's RC Primary School, Slateford
- St David's RC Primary School, Pilton
- St Francis' RC Primary School, Niddrie
- St John Vianney RC Primary School, Inch
- St John's RC Primary School, Portobello
- St Joseph's RC Primary School, Broomhouse
- St Mark's RC Primary School, Oxgangs
- St Mary's RC Primary School, Bonnington
- St Mary's RC Primary School, Leith
- St Ninian's RC Primary School, Restalrig
- St Peter's RC Primary School, Morningside
- Stenhouse Primary School
- Stockbridge Primary School
- Tollcross Primary School
- Towerbank Primary School
- Trinity Primary School
- Victoria Primary School
- Wardie Primary School

==== Outwith Edinburgh ====
- Currie Primary School, Currie
- Dalmeny Primary School
- Dean Park Primary School, Balerno
- Echline Primary School, South Queensferry
- Harmeny Education Trust, Balerno
- Hillwood Primary School, Ratho Station
- Kirkliston Primary School
- Nether Currie Primary School, Currie
- Newcraighall Primary School
- Queensferry Primary School, South Queensferry
- Ratho Primary School
- St Margaret's RC Primary School, South Queensferry

=== Secondary schools ===
==== Within Edinburgh ====
- Boroughmuir High School
- Broughton High School
- Castlebrae Community High School
- Craigmount High School
- Craigroyston Community High School
- Drummond Community High School
- Firrhill High School
- Forrester High School
- Gracemount High School
- Holyrood High School Edinburgh
- James Gillespie's High School
- Leith Academy
- Liberton High School
- Portobello High School
- The Royal High School
- St Augustine's High School
- St Thomas of Aquin's High School
- Trinity Academy, Edinburgh
- Tynecastle High School
- Wester Hailes Education Centre

==== Outwith Edinburgh ====
- Balerno Community High School
- Currie High School
- Queensferry High School, South Queensferry

=== Special schools ===
==== Within Edinburgh ====
- Braidburn Special School
- Cairnpark School
- Kaimes School
- Kingsinch School
- Oaklands Special School
- Pilrig Park School
- Prospect Bank School
- Rowanfield School
- Royal Blind School
- St Crispin's School

== Independent schools ==
=== Within Edinburgh ===
- Cargilfield Preparatory School (co-ed, day and boarding)
- Dunedin School
- The Edinburgh Academy (co-ed, day school, all ages)
- Edinburgh Rudolf Steiner School
- Fettes College (co-ed, all ages, day and boarding)
- George Heriot's School (co-ed, day school, all ages)
- George Watson's College (co-ed, day school, ages)
- Erskine Stewart's Melville Junior School (co-ed)
- The Mary Erskine School (girls, senior)
- Merchiston Castle School (boys, day and boarding, ages 7–18)
- Regius Christian School
- The Royal Blind School
- St George's School (girls, day and boarding, all ages)
- St Mary's Music School (specialist music, co-ed)
- Stewart's Melville College (boys, day and boarding, senior)

=== Outwith Edinburgh ===
- Clifton Hall School, Newbridge (co-ed, day school, all ages)
