= Oxgangs high rise flats =

British tower blocks

Coordinates: 55°54′39″N 3°13′24″W

The Oxgangs tower blocks (known locally as the Oxgangs high rise flats) were a group of 3 tower blocks which were built on Firrhill Drive/Oxgangs Crescent in 1961 and 1962. They each contained a mixture of flats and maisonettes with 2 bedrooms each, totalling up to 80 homes per block. The blocks were called "Allermuir Court" "Caerketton Court" and "Capelaw Court", and were named after three of the nearby Pentland Hills.

The original name of the group of three blocks was "Comiston Luxury Flats". They boasted outstanding views across Edinburgh, and offered a much better place to live than the slums of the inner city. However, a short while after their completion several problems were drawn into attention such as dampness, and after the 1970s the original families were beginning to move out of the blocks in search of other housing.

In 2003, Social Justice Minister Margaret Curran announced £10,000,000 in funding for demolition of the blocks and rebuilding of affordable housing on the site. Work began in 2003 with the decanting of Capelaw Court and by 2004 it was empty, finally being demolished (with the use of controlled explosives) on 17 April 2005. The demolition was screened live worldwide by the National Geographic Channel. Allermuir and Caerketton Court were next and they were both demolished within seconds of each other on 26 November 2006. On the site of Capelaw Court, 60 flats and 31 houses were built (managed by Dunedin Canmore Housing Association, Communities Scotland and the city council, in partnership). The first residents moved back to the new homes in early 2007. The site of the other two tower blocks is currently being developed into more housing. The whole project was due to be completed in around 2009/10.

== Cultural references ==
Singer-songwriter Kathy Muir wrote Like Warriors about her childhood in Capelaw Court. The video of the song includes photos and film footage of the Oxgangs high rise flats provided by other locals.

== Gallery ==
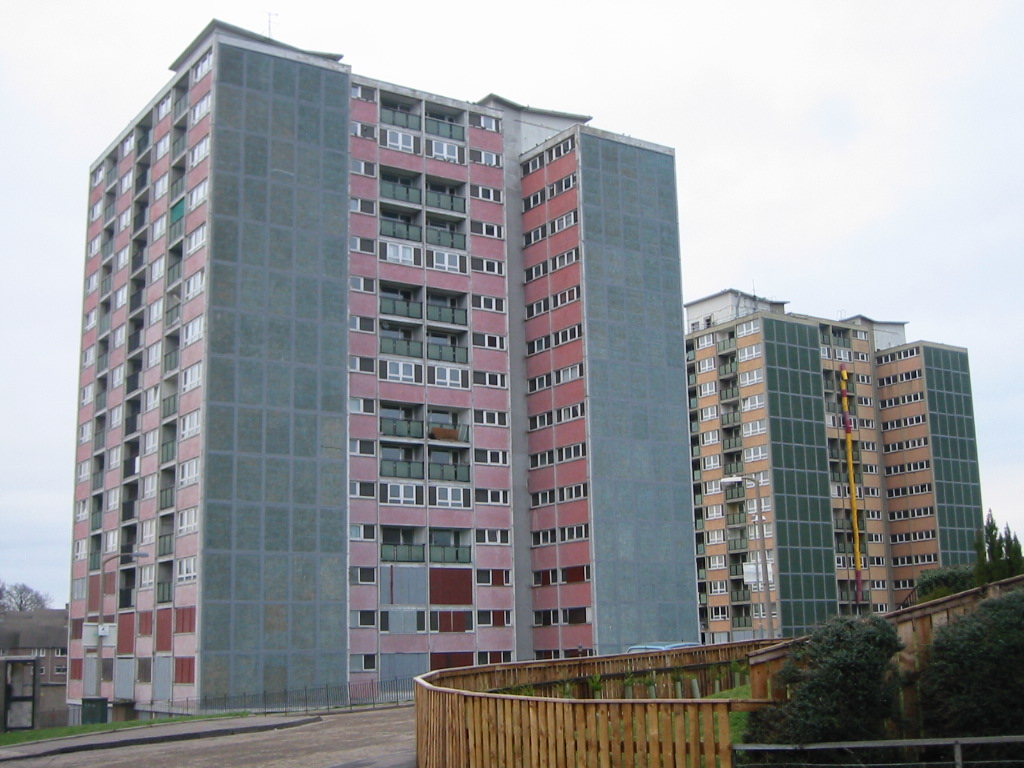
Two of what were originally three tower blocks

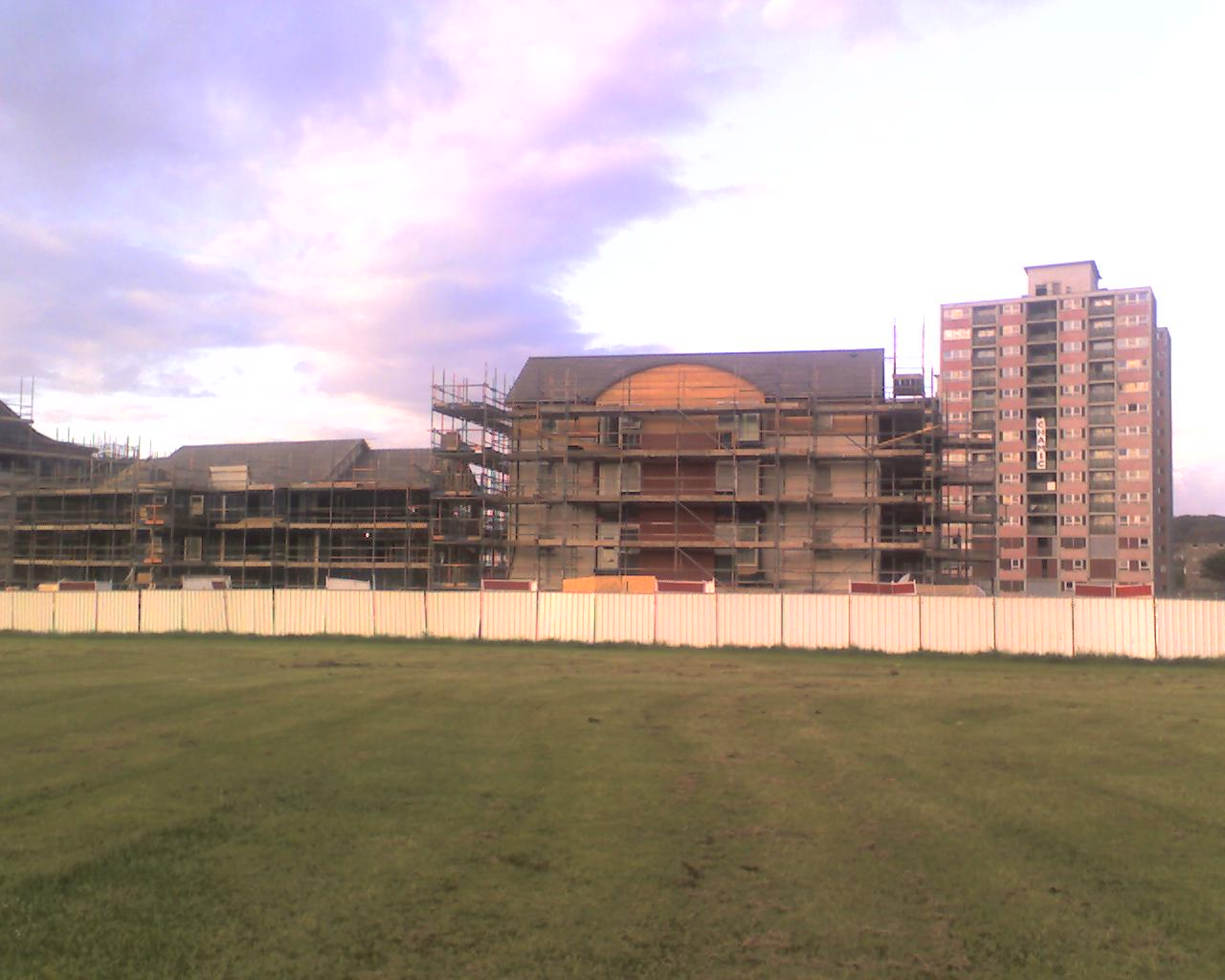
Phase 1 Construction, June 2006

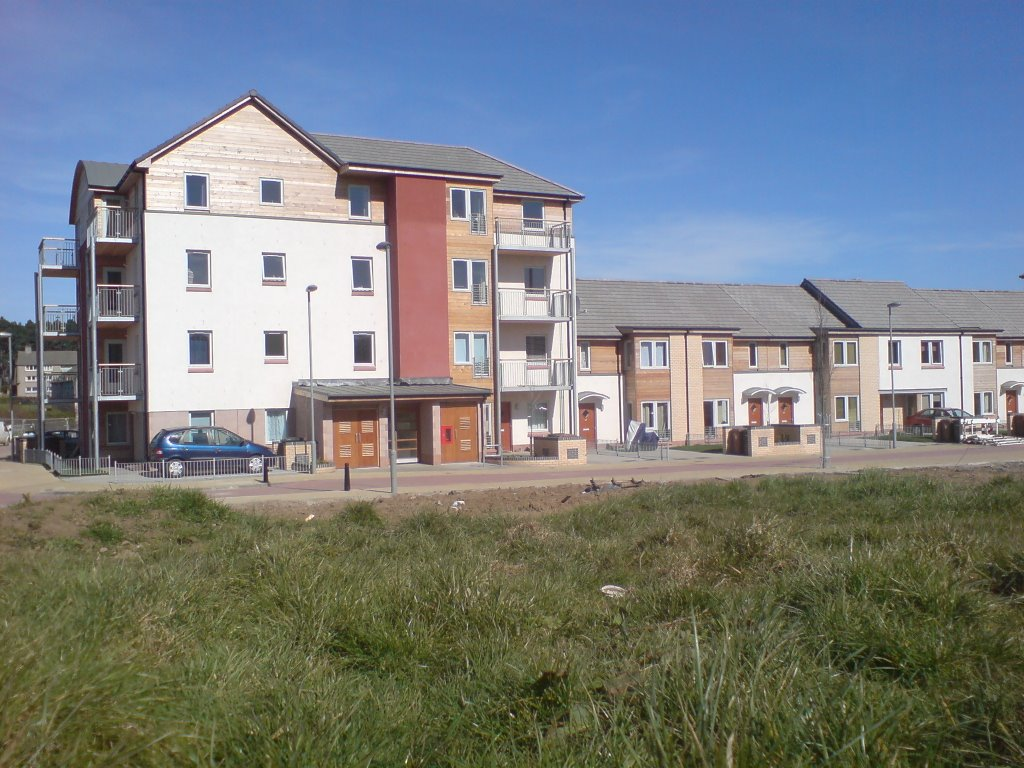
New housing on Firrhill Park (a new street created on what used to be the site of Capelaw Court)
