= Princess Margaret Rose Orthopaedic Hospital =

- Shown in Edinburgh

Geography
- Location: Fairmilehead, Edinburgh, Scotland
- Coordinates: 55.9°N 3.195°W

Organisation
- Care system: NHS
- Type: Specialist

Services
- Speciality: Orthopaedics

History
- Founded: 1932
- Closed: 2000

Links
- Lists: Hospitals in Scotland

The Princess Margaret Rose Orthopaedic Hospital was a hospital in Fairmilehead, Edinburgh, opened in 1932 and closed in 2000. After closure, with services transferred to the new Royal Infirmary of Edinburgh, it was demolished and the site sold for housing.

== History ==
=== Early history ===
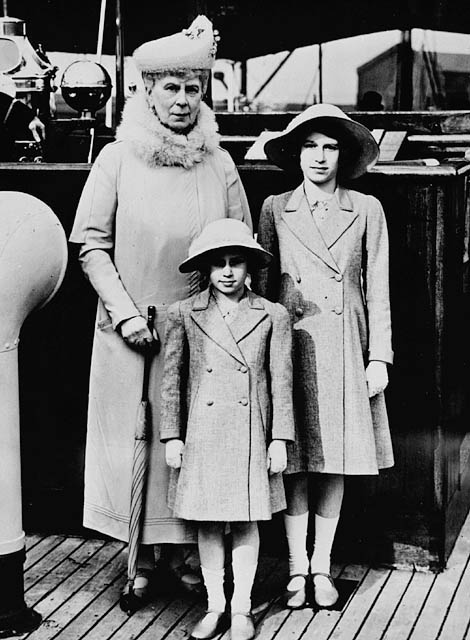
Princess Margaret Rose, centre, with her grandmother and elder sister in 1939

In the late 1920s, an appeal was launched to found a hospital for the orthopaedic treatment of physically disabled children in south-eastern Scotland. A site was on the Mortonhall estate, near Fairmilehead in southern Edinburgh.

The hospital opened in June 1932, as the Edinburgh Hospital for Crippled Children, with two 25-bed wards. A further two were opened by 1936, for a total capacity of 100 patients. Shortly after opening, it was renamed the Princess Margaret Rose Hospital for Crippled Children, after Princess Margaret Rose, the four-year-old younger daughter of the then Duke of York (later King George VI). The name was shortened to the Princess Margaret Rose Hospital for Children in 1937. The majority of cases came from osteomyelitis and tuberculosis infections, and prevailing medical opinion of the time held that open-air treatment was beneficial. The wards were roofed, but open to the air at the southern end, to ensure as much benefit from the fresh air as possible.

A residential block for nurses was built in 1935, designed by Reginald Fairlie, and later registered as a Grade B listed building. The western lodge, built at the same time, was Grade C listed.

During the 1940s the hospital began to be used for teaching orthopaedic nursing, with a two-year training program which led into a three-year registered nursing course at the Royal Infirmary of Edinburgh. This system lasted until 1978, when the teaching of orthopaedic nursing was restructured to be a post-registration course. On the foundation of the National Health Service in Scotland in 1948, the Princess Margaret passed into state management, grouped with the Edinburgh Central Hospitals.

=== Post-war development ===
Tuberculosis and osteomyelitis declined after the Second World War, and during the 1950s many patients had suffered from childhood polio. This also declined, following an extensive vaccination campaign in the early 1960s. During the 1960s, it became a centre of treatment for cases of phocomelia brought on by thalidomide. With the reduction in cases of childhood disability, the hospital (now renamed the Princess Margaret Rose Orthopaedic Hospital) began to focus on post-accident orthopaedic surgery and rehabilitation, mainly dealing with the victims of traffic accidents, and including a centre for the provision of prosthetic limbs. The hospital became a centre for research and development into prostheses, including the development of the first electrically-powered prosthetic arms by David Gow's research group in 1998.

In 1966, a new orthopaedic extension was built, designed by Morris and Steedman in a modernist style. This was later listed as Grade B building, but has since been demolished.

=== Closure and redevelopment ===
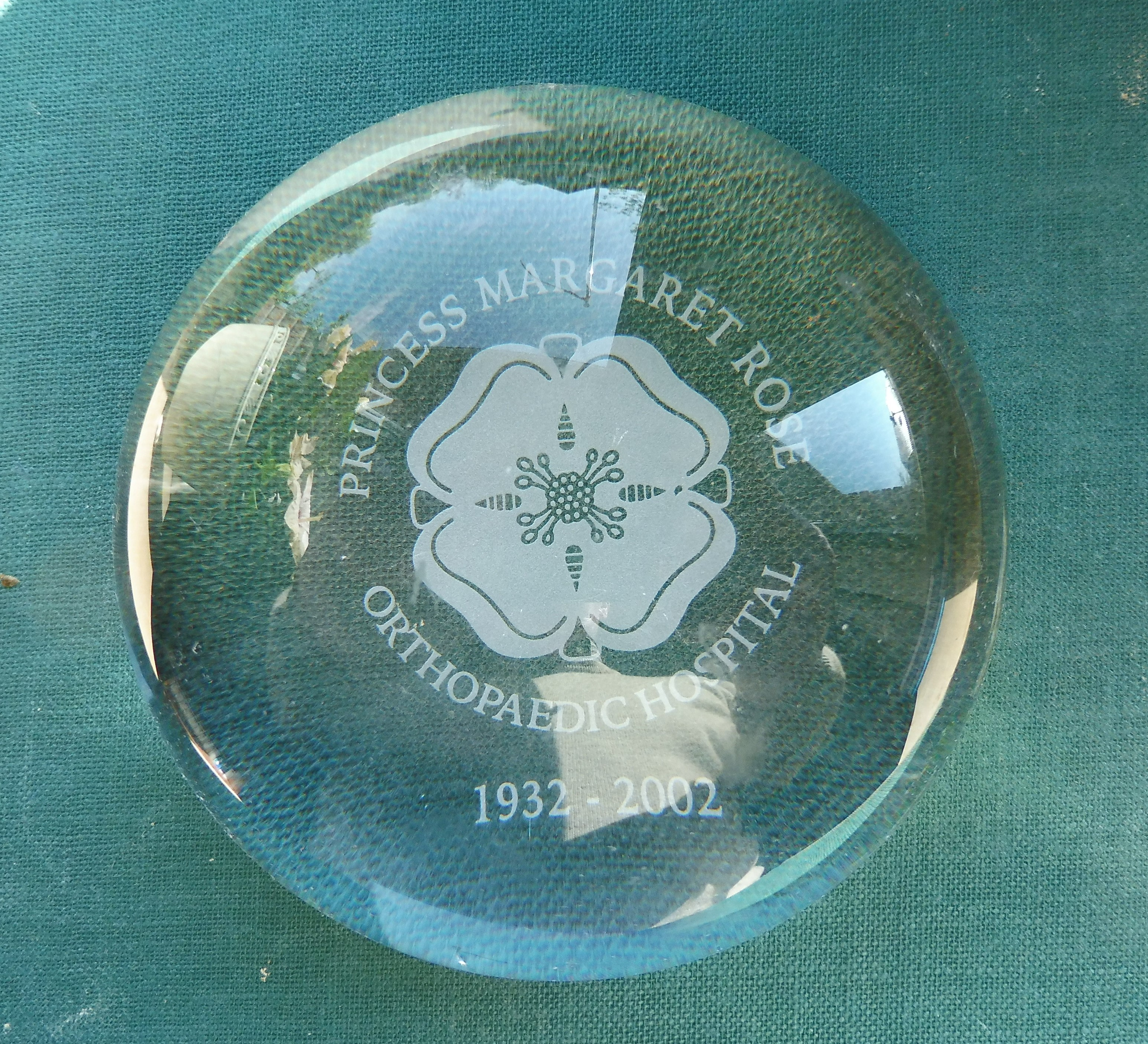
Paperweight

During the 1990s, a site in the south of Edinburgh was developed for the new Royal Infirmary of Edinburgh, which opened in 2003. As part of this redevelopment, a number of smaller hospitals were to be closed, with their work centralised at the new Infirmary. The Princess Margaret Rose was closed in 2000, with the site sold for housing for £4.3 million in 2002.

The developers, Bryant Homes, built 67 houses and two apartment blocks in the first phase of development, plus converted a third block (the former nurses' quarters) into flats. The initial plans for the second phase had relied on adapting the existing Orthopaedic Wing, a listed building, but this was demolished after an arson attack in 2002. It was replaced by a new development with six flats and seventeen terraced houses, under the name "Princess Gate", designed by Malcolm Fraser Architects. This later received a Scottish Design Award and was shortlisted for the RIAS Andrew Doolan Best Building in Scotland Award in 2007.

== Notable surgeons ==
- Sir Walter Mercer
- George Edwin Fulford, paediatric orthopaedics
- Jip James, professor
- Douglas Lamb, hand surgery
- Michael McMaster, spine surgery
- James Henry Sheilswood Scott, surgeon
- John Chalmers, metabolic bone disease
