= Bonaly =

Area of Edinburgh, Scotland

Coordinates: 55.895956°N 3.257439°W

Bonaly: Scottish Gaelic: Bonn Àth Linne
- Location within the City of Edinburgh council area Location within Scotland
- OS grid reference: NT214683
- Council area: City of Edinburgh
- Country: Scotland
- Sovereign state: United Kingdom
- Post town: EDINBURGH
- Postcode district: EH13
- Dialling code: 0131
- Police: Scotland
- Fire: Scottish
- Ambulance: Scottish
- UK Parliament: Edinburgh South West
- Scottish Parliament: Edinburgh Pentlands

Bonaly (/bəˈnæli/) is an area on the south-western outskirts of Edinburgh and the northern slopes of the Pentland Hills, lying within the Parish of Colinton. It is a mix of mainly post-war housing, woodland, pasture-land and heather moorland. Bonaly Burn has its sources in the hills above Bonaly and flows towards Oxgangs, where it becomes the Braid Burn. The Edinburgh City Bypass passes through Bonaly.

== Name ==
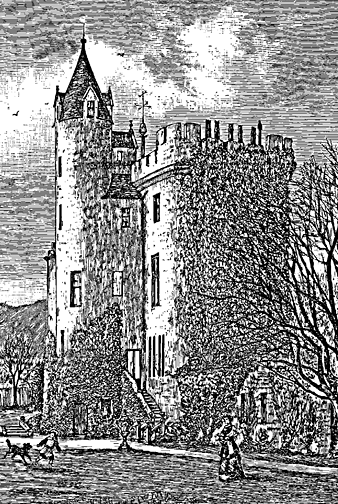
Bonaly Tower

The name Bonaly may be derived from the Scottish Gaelic Bonn àth Linne (meaning “the pool at the bottom ford”) or from Bàn àth Linne (meaning “the pool at the white ford”). An alternative suggestion is that the derivation is from the Gaelic Bonn-aill (meaning "the foot of the rocks or cliff").

The placename has appeared in many different forms and spellings. Early variations include Banale in 1438, Bonala in 1538 and Bonally in 1531. Other variations include Bonala, Bonalay, Boneyley, Bonnalay, Bonailie and Bonaley.

In Timothy Pont's detailed 1654 map of Scotland, it appears as a small settlement close to the Pentland Hills, labelled Bonely, and also appears on the Map of the Three Lothians in 1773 as Bonilie.

Harrison Gardens and Harrison Place, in the Edinburgh district of Merchiston, were originally named Bonaly Road and Bonaly Place. They were renamed in 1965 to avoid confusion with similar addresses in Colinton.

== History ==
=== Early history ===
Although now considered to be part of the Edinburgh suburb of Colinton, Bonaly was originally a small settlement in its own right. This existed on the banks of the Bonaly Burn, close to the present-day site of Bonaly Tower, until its destruction after 1811. There is no evidence to indicate when Bonaly was first settled, but the area has a long history of human occupation and the remains of an Iron Age hillfort may be seen at Clubbiedean, 2 km to the south-west.

In the 12th century, Norman barons began to arrive in Scotland and establish feudal estates. The lands of Bonaly formed part of the Barony of Redhall which also included Redhall itself, Oxgangs, Comiston, Swanston, Dreghorn, Pilmuir, Woodhall and Colinton. The earliest mention of Bonaly may be from 1280, when it appears in an account of legal proceedings concerning straying livestock.

In 1400, the Barony – and the ownership of Bonaly – was granted to Sir William Cunningham of Kilmaurs, by Robert III. Some time after 1538, ownership passed to James Foulis, who became Baron Colinton.

The Foulis family were supporters of the Royalist cause during the Civil War. Their fortunes suffered badly after Cromwell's victorious campaign in Scotland and they were forced to sell off much of their lands. In the aftermath of Cromwell's campaign, English troops were billeted at Bonaly.

=== Bonaly Village ===
The village of Bonaly is likely to have been home to a modest population of tenant farmers, living in cot-houses, raising livestock and practising the open field system of rig and furrow agriculture. They may have supplemented their income with weaving. It is difficult to estimate the size of the settlement at this time but the area under cultivation was extensive. Traces of rig and furrow cultivation strips can be seen in the hills high above Bonaly, on land that has now reverted to rough-grazing.

By the 17th century, Bonaly appears to have been thriving and is mentioned frequently in the Kirk Session records. In addition to the dwellings of the tenant farmers, there was a substantial farmhouse (c. 1650), several waulk mills, a skinnery, a distillery, a magnesia factory and a flax mill. These industries stood on the banks of the Bonaly Burn, which was used as a power-source, a supply of water and for carrying away waste. Prior to the damming of its tributaries, the Lady Burn and the Dean Burn, Bonaly Burn would have provided a more powerful flow of water for milling. The community never had its own kirk, and parishioners travelled to the kirk in Colinton to attend services.

After several changes of ownership in the 17th century, Bonaly was eventually bought in 1700 by Sir John Foulis of Woodhall. Sir John's Account Book (1671–1707) contains frequent mentions of Bonaly, of the business he did there and of the rents he received from his tenants in the village.

The 17th and 18th centuries were a time of radical change in the Scottish agricultural landscape, Bonaly included. The process of enclosure resulted in the disappearance of the small strips of land cultivated by tenant farmers as these were re-arranged into larger and more productive fields, surrounded by newly planted hedgerows. Bonaly Road – linking the village of Bonaly with Woodhall Road and Colinton – is likely to have been formed on its current line during this period and the hedgerows along the road may be the remnants of those planted at this time. Sir John Foulis was keen to improve his lands and, as well as enclosing existing farmland, brought areas of moorland under cultivation. Whilst the new farming methods were more productive, they required less labour and the village of Bonaly is likely to have declined as farmers left to seek other employment.

=== Destruction of the village ===
In the 18th century, the northern portion of Bonaly was acquired by James Gillespie, a Colinton merchant, mill-owner and philanthropist. In his will, Gillespie left a legacy to fund the establishment of a charitable school, which was known as Gillespie's Hospital. The Bonaly Farm premises were part of the legacy bequeathed to this school.

A southern portion, including the village of Bonaly, was leased by Lord Cockburn. He developed the 17th century farmhouse into a country house and, in doing so, ordered the destruction of the village. In his own words he:

...began by an annual lease of a few square yards and a scarcely habitable farm-house but, realizing the profanations of Auburn, I have destroyed a village, and erected a tower, and reached the dignity of a twenty-acred laird.

The buildings in the village were demolished and the inhabitants presumably evicted. It is probable that the community had been in decline for some time. Enclosure had lessened the demand for agricultural labour and the small-scale industries on the Bonaly Burn would have been unable to compete with the larger and more efficient mills being established elsewhere, particularly on the Water of Leith.

After the destruction of the village, the population of Bonaly fell to its lowest level for centuries. Although extensive farm buildings, a large farmhouse and a row of farm labourers cottages were built at Bonaly Farm during the 19th century, few people were living in Bonaly at the close of the 19th century.

The house created by Lord Cockburn was named Bonaly Tower and still exists.

Bonaly Primary School was first established in a building built on Thorburn road in 1891, that is extant and Category C listed but the school moved to different sites in the 20th century.

=== 20th century ===
This began to change during the early 20th century, due to the rapid expansion of Colinton as an Edinburgh commuter suburb. Several large villas were individually constructed on Bonaly Road in the 1920s and 1930s.

Expansion accelerated after the Second World War. In 1959, house-builders Mactaggart and Mickel commenced large-scale housing development on the land adjacent to Bonaly Farm – formerly known as the East Field. Over the following 40 years over 500 houses were constructed and, by 2000, virtually all the land between Bonaly Farm and the Edinburgh City Bypass had been developed for housing. The Bonaly Farm buildings fell into disuse during this period. Bonaly Farmhouse was detached from the farm and became a private residence. The farm buildings themselves were gutted by fire in 1981. Most of the buildings on the site were demolished when it was subsequently developed for housing, but some were retained and incorporated into the new homes.

Bonaly Farm Dairy continued to supply dairy products from premises at nearby West Mill Road in Colinton and now operates from premises in Loanhead.

== Bonaly Primary School ==
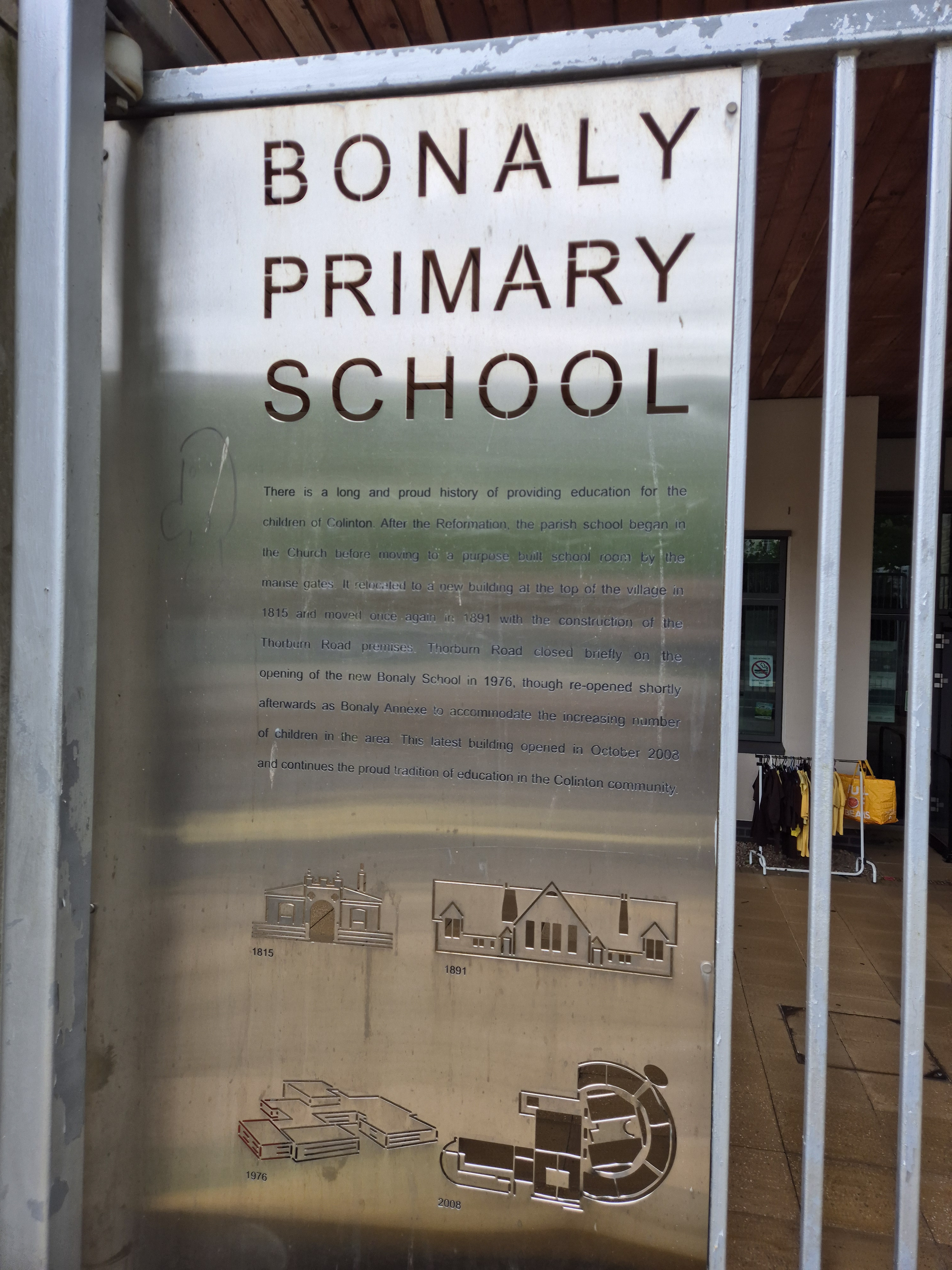
Bonaly Primary School Memorial Sign, seen in 2025

Bonaly Primary School is the main local provider of primary education, with a catchment taking in most of the Colinton area. It accommodates pupils from primaries one to seven and also has a nursery for children between three and five years of age. It is managed by the City of Edinburgh Council and is a feeder school for Firrhill High School

Pupils wear a distinctive yellow and brown uniform, with a school badge depicting Bonaly Tower against the backdrop of the Pentland Hills. The badge was designed by a pupil, Sheron Watts when the school first opened in 1976.

The school opened on a greenfield site in 1976 and was intended to replace older school premises at Thorburn Road in Colinton, which had been unable to cope with the demand for school places. The new school at Bonaly was, however, never large enough to accommodate all the pupils and the Thorburn Road premises were re-opened as an annex for use by nursery and infant classes. Additional pre-fab classrooms were also used at the main school site.

In 2007, the school buildings were demolished and replaced with a larger building, opened in October 2008. All pupils are now accommodated on this site with the former premises in Thorburn Road later becoming a care home.

In 2023, the school was evacuated and the bomb squad attended after an antique military item was found on the site.

== Bonaly Tower ==
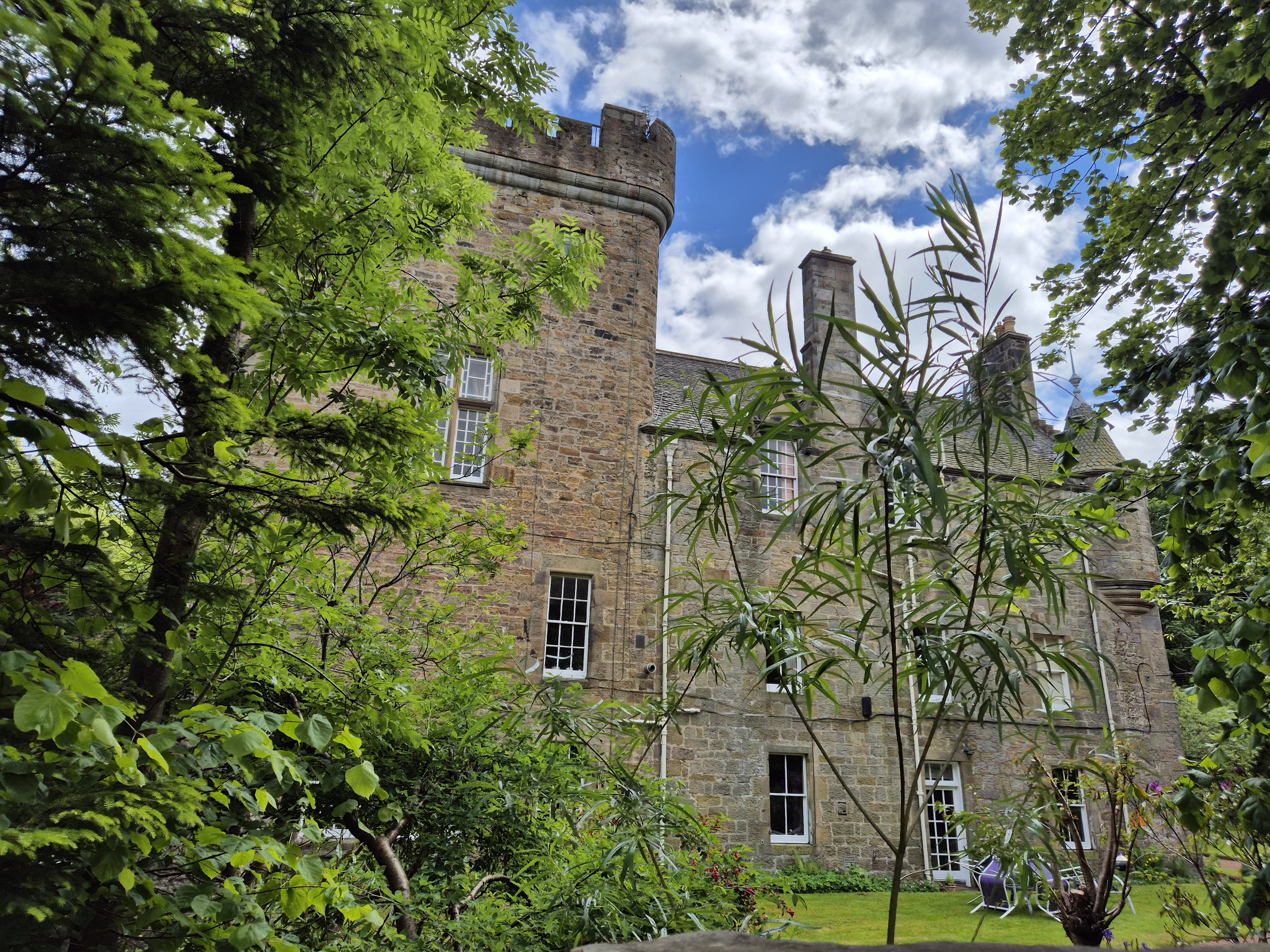
Bonaly Tower, 2025

Bonaly Tower is located on the site of the 17th century farmhouse that once stood at the centre of the village of Bonaly. On the directions of Lord Cockburn, the farmhouse was extended, and the village cleared to create his 18th century country residence. In 1836, the architect William Henry Playfair added an imitation peel tower as well as the east range to the building. It was further extended by David Bruce in 1874, who added a western wing and a third floor. The original farmhouse was visible until 1886, when the library wing was completed in 1899, by architects Sydney, Mitchell and Wilson. In 1946, Stewart Kaye and Partners, converted the building to 5 flats. The building is Category A listed.

Bonaly Tower was the venue for frequent meetings of the 'Friday Club', a group of leading Edinburgh literati, which were hosted by Lord Cockburn.

== Bonaly Scout Centre ==
In 1931 the Scout Association acquired an 11-hectare site, formerly part of the grounds of Bonaly Tower, for use as a permanent campsite.

Bonaly Outdoor Centre has two large camping fields, with capacity for over two hundred campers, and two buildings providing indoor accommodation. One of these – Forth Lodge – has been purpose-built for groups with special needs. The centre is used by parties of Scouts, Guides and other youth groups, both from the local area and further afield. It has hosted many visiting groups from overseas.

The centre has a permanent manager, based on-site, who is supported by the Bonaly Service Team, a group of volunteers who assist in the running and maintenance of the centre. It is officially owned and operated by the South East Scotland Regional Scout Council.

Within the grounds of the Outdoor Centre is a stone-built bathing pool, naturally fed by the waters of the Dean Burn. Known locally as the 'Roman Bath' or 'Lord Cockburn's Bath', it is believed to have been constructed in the 19th century.

== Bonaly Country Park ==
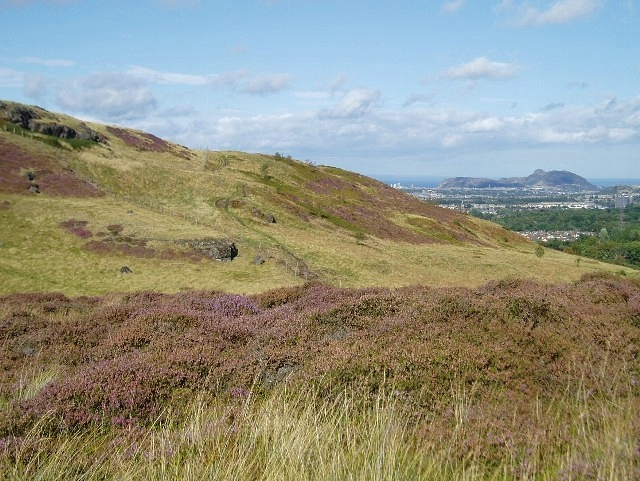
Bonaly Country Park

Bonaly Country Park was designated in 1984, and is a 290-hectare area of woodland, open moorland and reservoirs. It is entirely owned by the City of Edinburgh Council, with the exception of Clubbiedean and Torduff Reservoirs which are owned by Scottish Water. The park is managed as part of the Pentland Hills Regional Park. There are excellent views of Edinburgh, the Lothians, Fife and the Firth of Forth from the park. The main access is via Bonaly Road, at the top of which a small car park is located.

The Country Park is divided into lower and upper sections. The lower park has been in public ownership and managed as a public park since the 1940s. It has not been grazed by livestock since the creation of the Country Park and woodland has started to strongly re-establish itself. The upper park occupies a much larger proportion of the Country Park and is mostly heather moorland or unimproved grassland, leased to a tenant farmer for hill grazing. The two sections are separated by woodland plantations, established in the 1920s.

== Bonaly Reservoir ==
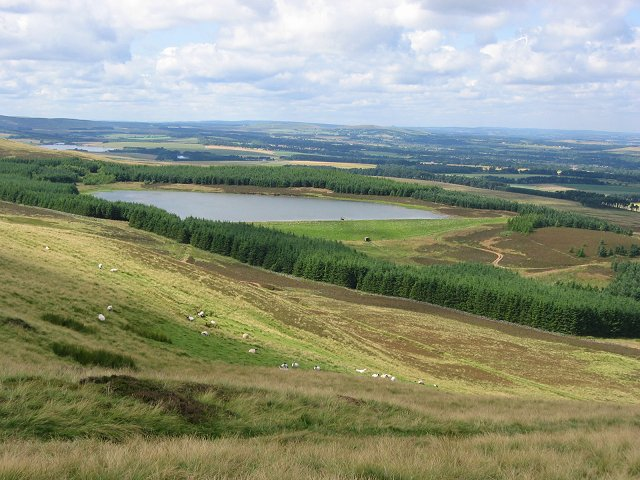
Bonaly Reservoir

During the 19th century, the Edinburgh Water Company created several reservoirs in the Pentland Hills. Bonaly Reservoir was one of the first to be constructed, and had two purposes – to supply fresh drinking water to the city and to ensure a constant flow of water in lower watercourses by acting as a compensation reservoir.

The reservoir is situated in a shelf on the north-west slope of Capelaw Hill. At 340m above sea level, it is one of the highest bodies of water in the Pentlands and has an unusually small natural water catchment area. The natural catchment has been augmented by catch-drains laid out across the hillside to the south-west, which act to divert spring and rain-water into the reservoir.

The present Bonaly Reservoir was created on the site of an existing body of water – known as Bonaly Pools – by the damming of the Dean Burn with a stone-faced earthwork in 1853. It has a capacity of 218 million litres and is 7.5m deep when full. The remains of an earlier earthwork dam are located to the north of the current dam.

This site of the present reservoir has been a source of fresh water for Edinburgh since 1761. A wooden pipeline was constructed from Bonaly Pools to Swanston, from where it was piped into the city. The wooden pipes were replaced by iron pipes towards the end of the 18th century. This pipeline was re-discovered during a RCAHMS survey of adjacent military training areas in 2005.

Unlike most of the Pentland reservoirs, Bonaly is not managed by Scottish Water and no longer forms part of the water supply chain. It is owned and managed by the City of Edinburgh Council. Proposals exist to manage the water levels in the reservoir so that feeding and breeding opportunities for wildlife are maximised.

== Local services ==
Bonaly is served by a corner shop, opened in 1985, and by Lothian Buses number 10.

== Other sources ==
- Lynne Gladstone-Millar, The Colinton Story: celebrating 900 years of a Scottish parish, St Andrew Press, Edinburgh, 1994, ISBN 978-0-86153-195-0
