= John Chalmers =

John Chalmers may refer to:

- John Chalmers (missionary) (1825–1899), Scottish Protestant missionary in China and translator
- John Chalmers (coach) (1874–1962), American football, basketball and baseball coach
- John Alan Chalmers (1904–1967), British atmospheric physicist
- John Chalmers (trade unionist) (1915–1983), Scottish trade unionist
- John Chalmers (surgeon) (born 1927), Scottish orthopaedic surgeon
- John Chalmers (medical researcher) (born 1937), Australian medical researcher
- John Chalmers (moderator), minister of the Church of Scotland
- One half of the duo (with Sandra Marrs) who creates comic books under the pseudonym Metaphrog
