= J. I. P. James =

British orthopaedic surgeon

J. I. P. James MS, FRCS, FRCSEd
- Born: John Ivor Pulsford James; 13 October 1913; London, England
- Died: 11 July 2001 (aged 87)
- Citizenship: British
- Education: Eggars Grammar School, University College, London
- Occupation: Professor of orthopaedic surgery
- Known for: Surgical teaching and training
- Medical career
- Institutions: Royal Infirmary of Edinburgh, Princess Margaret Rose Hospital, University of Edinburgh
- Sub-specialties: Hand surgery, surgery for scoliosis
- Notable works: Poliomyelitis: Essentials of Surgical Management; Scoliosis

John Ivor Pulsford James (13 October 1913 – 11 July 2001) was a British orthopaedic surgeon. He was professor of orthopaedic surgery at the University of Edinburgh from 1958 to 1979. Most commonly known as "JIP", he was secretary then president of the British Orthopaedic Association which later awarded him its honorary fellowship. James attracted orthopaedic specialists to work in Edinburgh, encouraging them to develop an interest in a specialist area of orthopaedics, and in this way he was able to establish a comprehensive regional orthopaedic service. He made contributions to hand surgery and surgical treatment of scoliosis, and was a prime mover in promoting specialist training and qualification in orthopaedic surgery in the UK.

== Early life and education ==
James was born in London, son of Stanley Bloomfield James, and his wife Jessica (née Heley). His father had worked in a variety of jobs around the world, as a lumberjack in Canada, as a combatant in the Spanish American War, as a lay preacher, and eventually as a writer. James was one of a large family and his education was financed through scholarships. After schooling at Eggars Grammar School in Alton, Hampshire, he studied medicine at University College, London, qualifying MB BS from University College Hospital (UCH) in 1938. He was house surgeon at the Royal National Orthopaedic Hospital, being appointed surgical registrar there in 1941. He joined the Royal Army Medical Corps in 1943.

== Wartime service ==
Having volunteered for the Special Operations Executive (SOE), James was parachuted into Yugoslavia in late 1943 after two earlier attempts were unsuccessful. He arrived at Kolasin near the Montenegrin-Albanian border to give medical support to Yugoslav Partisans who were part of a resistance movement against the occupying German forces. With the Partisan combatants constantly on the move, he operated in caves, stables, or mountain huts, with the operative field often lit only by candlelight. He wrote a first-hand account of this experience in 1992. After the war he was awarded the Golden Star of Service by the then Republic of Yugoslavia.

== Surgical career ==
In 1948 James was appointed as a consultant orthopaedic surgeon to the Royal National Orthopaedic Hospital and was awarded a Rockefeller scholarship to gain orthopaedic experience in the United States. He acted as assistant director to Mr (later Sir) Herbert Seddon and together they arranged orthopaedic training programmes which were to gain national and international reputations. He was appointed in 1958 to the chair of orthopaedic surgery at the University of Edinburgh, which involved clinical and teaching responsibilities for elective cases at the Princess Margaret Rose Hospital and for emergency admissions at the Royal Infirmary of Edinburgh. He organised a regional orthopaedic service for Lothian and established training programmes which attracted trainees from around the world. He believed in structured specialist training. As chairman of the Specialist Advisory Committee in Orthopaedics he persuaded the Royal College of Surgeons of Edinburgh to establish an exit examination toward the end of higher surgical training in orthopaedics (FRCSEd (Orth), which subsequently became the Intercollegiate Specialty Fellowship in 1990 and was subsequently adopted as the norm for all surgical specialties in the United Kingdom and Ireland. His clinical and research interests were in the surgery of the hand and the surgical treatment of scoliosis.

James became secretary and then president of the British Orthopaedic Association, and the association's award of its honorary fellowship gave him particular pleasure. In 1959, James was elected a member of the Harveian Society of Edinburgh.

== Personal life ==
After retiring from the Edinburgh chair in 1979, James worked as director of orthopaedic services in Kuwait and later in Saudi Arabia. He finally retired to the village of Slad in Gloucestershire.

James married Margaret Samuel, a general practitioner, in 1968, with whom he had two children, Tomasin and Jonathan. He also has 5 grandchildren; Livvy, Eve, Kitty, Finn and Ivor.

James died on 11 July 2001.

== Selected publications ==
- Idiopathic scoliosis The prognosis, diagnosis, and operative indications related to curve patterns and the age at onset, Journal of Bone and Joint Surgery. British Volume 36-B, Issue 101 Feb 1954, 36-49
- The management of infants with scoliosis. Journal of Bone and Joint Surgery. 57B:422–429 (November), 1975
- The orthopaedic surgeon and research The Second R. I. Harris Lecture Journal of Bone and Joint Surgery. British Volume 52-B, Issue 101 Feb 1970, 14-28 (subscription required)
