= Abbeyhill =

Area of Edinburgh, Scotland

Coordinates: 55°57′25.81″N 3°10′10.30″W

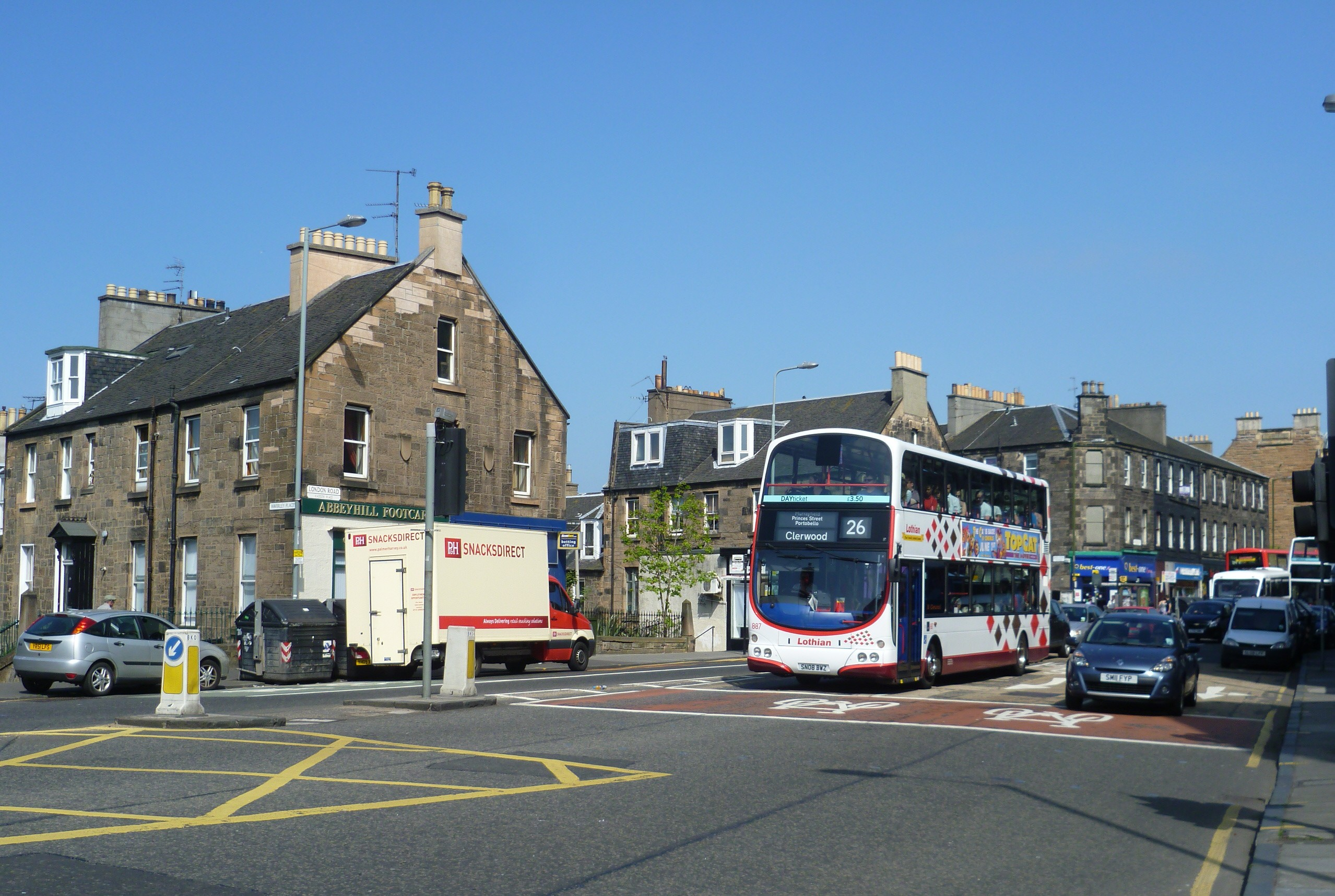
London Road, Abbeyhill

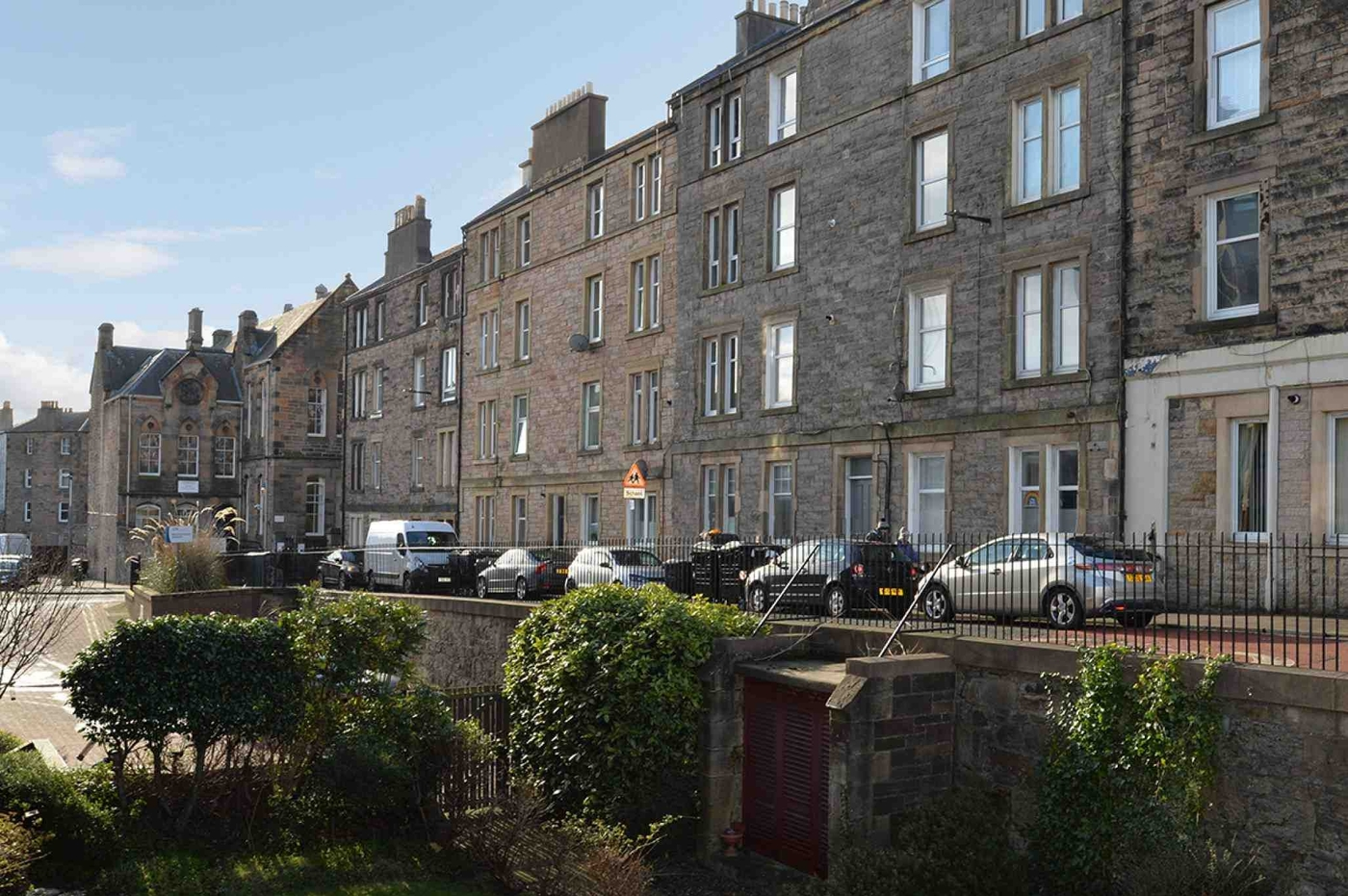

Abbeyhill is an area of Edinburgh, the capital of Scotland.

Abbeyhill is one of the oldest parts of the city, taking its name from Holyrood Abbey, a major historic religious site. The main east-west thoroughfare through the area is London Road, laid in the 1820s as part of the Calton development of the New Town. This superseded an older road to Haddington which still skirts the north side of the Holyrood Park.

As with many other parts of the city, the area has varying definitions. Generally it may be taken to mean the part of town lying between Holyrood Park (and perhaps The Palace of Holyroodhouse itself) to the south; London Road and adjoining streets to the north; Calton Hill and the yards of Waverley Station to the west; and Meadowbank to the east. It is in the locale of the Scottish Parliament building, contains several old churches and other historic sites, and looks onto the Palace of Holyroodhouse.

== Geography ==
The suburb is largely composed of streets of tenement housing, such as Waverley Park and Milton Street, built in the mid-1890s on the grounds of Comely Gardens, a pleasure garden belonging to a local mansion, which operated along the same lines as London's Vauxhall Gardens. It was from here that James Tytler made Britain's first hot-air balloon flight in 1784, landing about half a mile away in Restalrig.

Another area of distinctive distinctive character is "The rows", several streets of colony houses on the north side of London Road. The south side of Lower London Road, sloping down to Meadowbank, is a mix of earlier small-scale industrial premises and newer residential housing.

In recent years, Abbeyhill has seen more independent shops, bars and cafés, as well as significant residential investment, with new modern flats being built alongside the existing Victorian and Edwardian tenement flats. There are numerous dedicated residential and business forums for the area and also opportunities to connect including the well-established Abbeyhill Colony of Artists.

== Culture and community ==
=== Educational establishments ===
Abbeyhill Primary School is located on Abbey Street to the south of London Road.

The Category-B listed Abbeymount Techbase building sits at the top of Easter Road, and was initially built as a primary school in 1874 is now used as artists studios.

== Transport ==
Abbeyhill station was opened in 1869 and closed in 1964 as a result of the Beeching cuts.

Abbeyhill is conveniently linked to the city centre by Regent Road and Calton Road, allowing quick access to the city centre and Edinburgh Waverley railway station. Many Lothian Buses routes serve the area and provide easy access to the city and to East Lothian.

== See also ==
- Holyrood Palace
- Scottish Parliament Building
- Calton Hill
- Old Royal High School
