= Oxgangs =

Suburb of Edinburgh, Scotland

Coordinates: 55.908°N 3.221°W

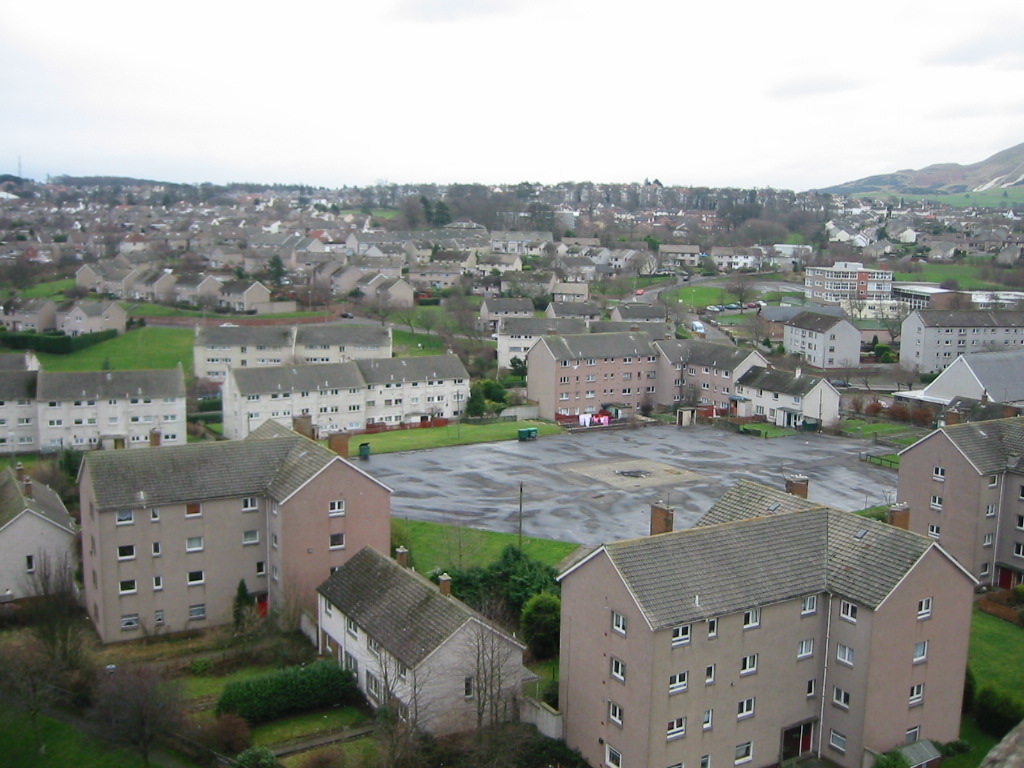
- Oxgangs Crescent and Comiston area

- Location within the City of Edinburgh council area Location within Scotland
- Population: Unknown
- Council area: City of Edinburgh
- Country: Scotland
- Sovereign state: United Kingdom
- Post town: Edinburgh
- Postcode district: EH13
- Dialling code: 0131 (441, 445)
- Police: Scotland
- Fire: Scottish
- Ambulance: Scottish
- UK Parliament: Edinburgh South West
- Scottish Parliament: Edinburgh Pentlands

Oxgangs is a suburb in the south-west of Edinburgh, Scotland. Surrounding districts include Caiystane, Dreghorn, Redford, Fairmilehead, Colinton and Swanston and Colinton Mains. The post code area for Oxgangs is EH13.

== Etymology ==
The name derives from "oxgang", an old unit of land measurement. Skene in Celtic Scotland says:

"in the eastern district [of Scotland] there is a uniform system of land denomination consisting of 'dabhachs', 'ploughgates' and 'oxgangs', each 'dabhach' consisting of four 'ploughgates' and each 'ploughgate' containing eight 'oxgangs'."

== History ==
The building of the area started in around 1953/54; before that (with the exception of Colinton Mains) there had only been a number of prefab houses and several farms but it had been mostly farmland and was basically considered to be part of the countryside. The area consists of large public housing schemes aimed at low to middle income groups, ranging from private bungalows to the City of Edinburgh Council-owned high rise tower blocks (although these have now been demolished).

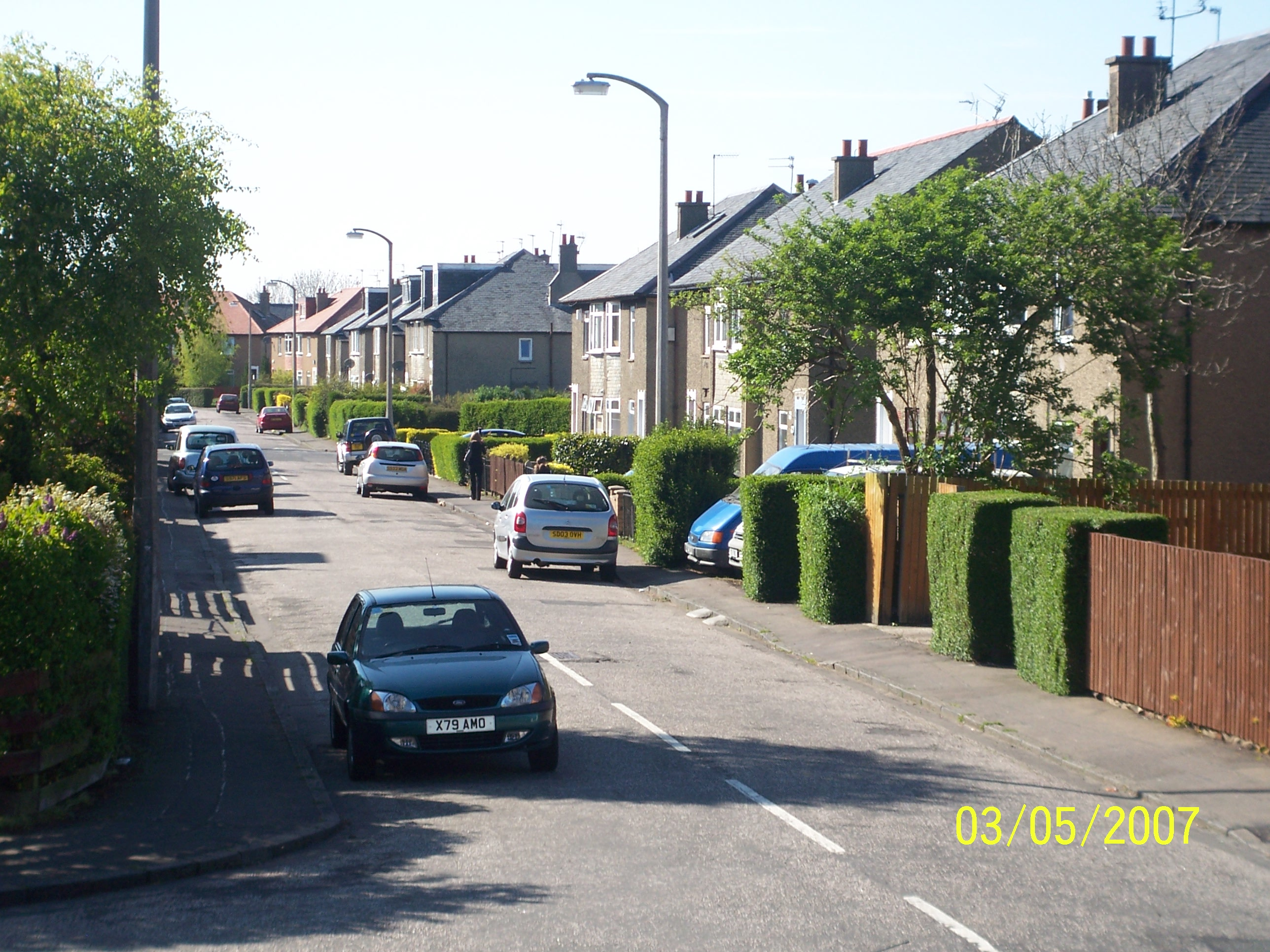
Colinton Mains Grove, a street which lies in the neighbouring housing scheme of Colinton Mains

A significant majority of former council-owned properties in Oxgangs have been bought by tenants under the right to buy scheme leaving approximately 659 properties in council ownership thus making it extremely difficult to be allocated a council home in the area.

Peter Hoffmann has written memoirs of growing up in Oxgangs between 1958 and 1972 which capture the era and its social and cultural history. He has also written Two Worlds: The Story of an Edinburgh Doctor, a biography of Dr Arthur Motley, a Black American, and the first general practitioner to set up his practice in the area in the mid-1940s until his retirement in 1978.

== Amenities ==
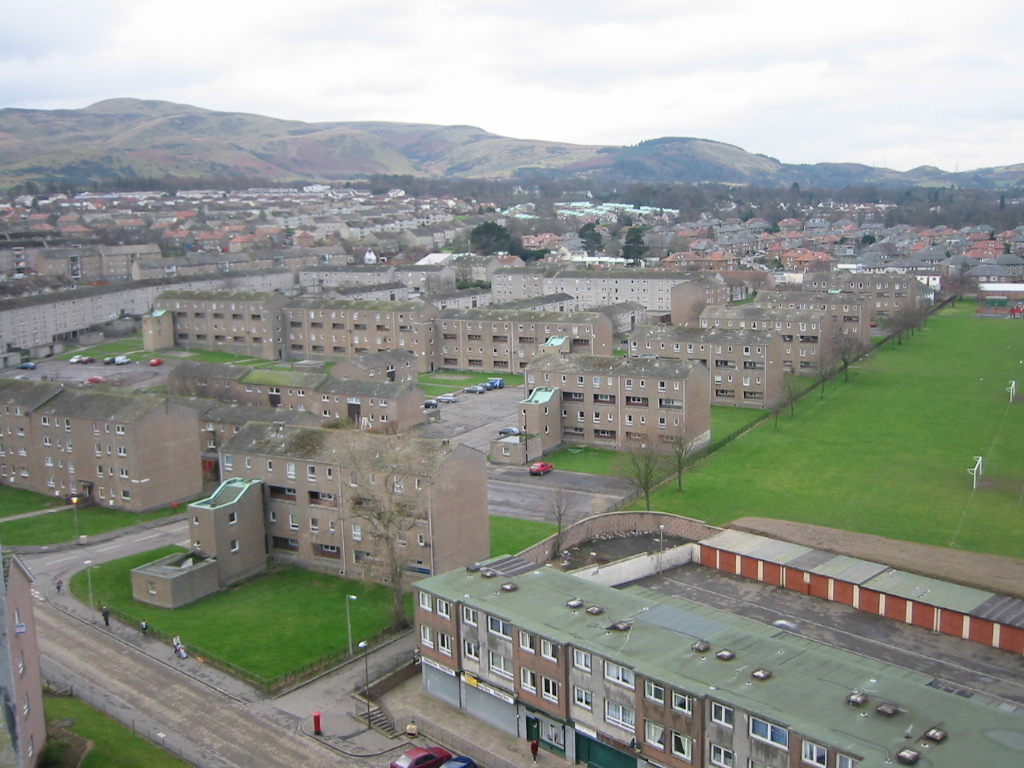

There were two small shopping areas at each end of Oxgangs known locally as the "top" and "bottom" shops. The top shops (Oxgangs Broadway) are larger. The bottom shops (Oxgangs Crescent) bottom right of photograph, were demolished along with the high flats, being replaced by housing. Located in and around Oxgangs and adjacent areas are a police station, a medical practice, a public library, a nursery, three primary schools and a high school, and a pub.

There are three churches in the area: Church of Scotland, Scottish Episcopal Church and St Mark's Roman Catholic Church, opened by Archbishop Gordon Gray in 1962. Recently a Kingdom Hall was built in the Oxgangs Green area.

Surrounding Oxgangs are three large supermarkets: a Tesco next to Firrhill High School, a Morrisons near the Swanston area and a Scotmid in Colinton Mains. In 2017, Aldi opened a store on the site where the social work building and St John's church previously stood.

== AC Oxgangs ==
AC Oxgangs, a community football team, was founded in 2001. They currently operate 14 teams selected from a total player pool of around 200 youngsters which range in age from 7 to 18 years old. They play their 7-a-side and 11-a-side home games at Colinton Mains Park just beside Oxgangs Road North where a brand new clubhouse has just been erected. Younger members occasionally play 4-a-side games at the Saughton Sports Complex off Balgreen Road, but also play 7-a-side games at Colinton Mains Park.

== Recent changes ==
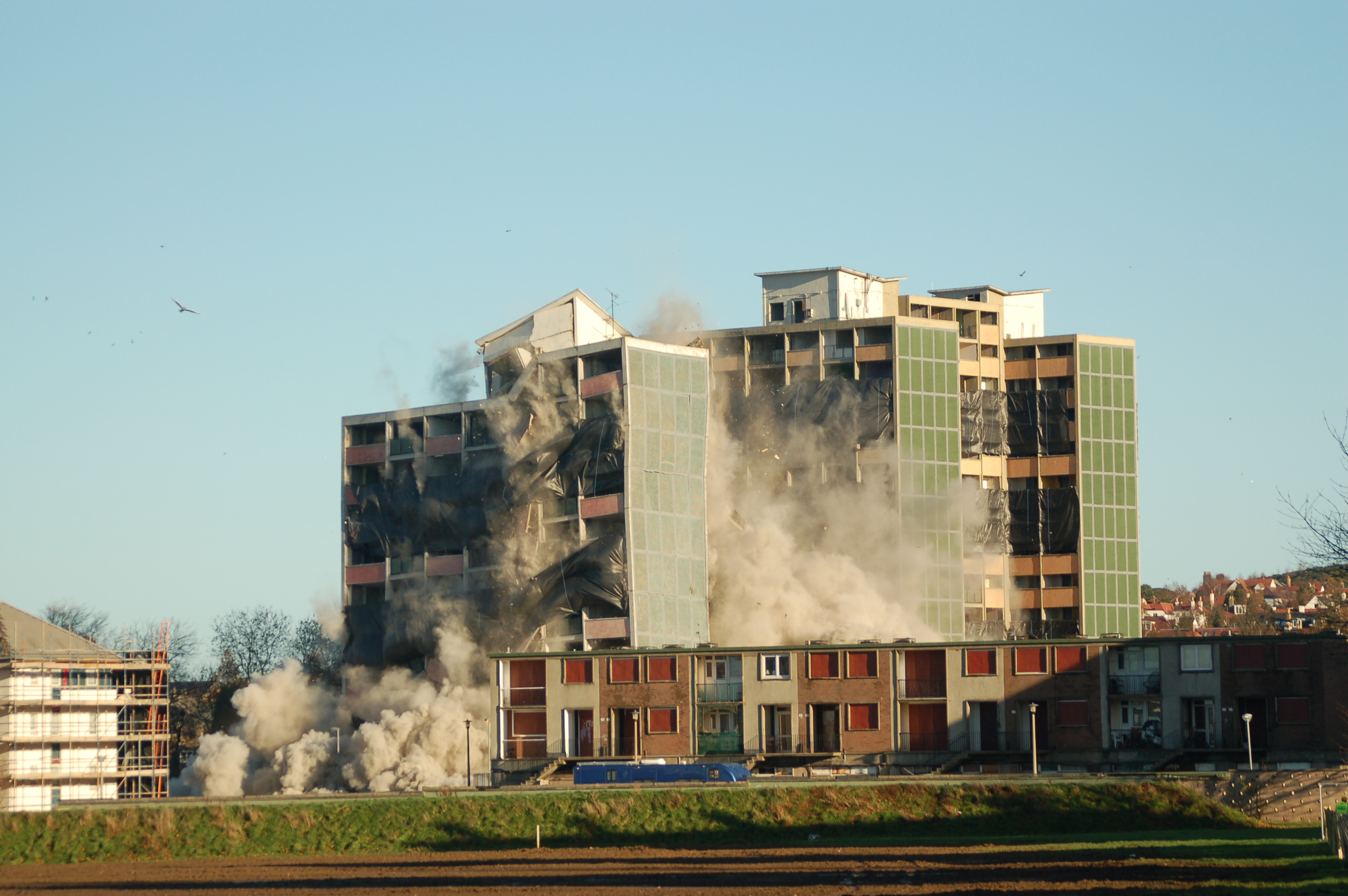
Oxgangs tower block demolition on 26 November 2006

In 2003, after years of campaigning by residents the council decided to demolish and redevelop Oxgangs high rise flats. In April 2005 longstanding tower block Capelaw Court was demolished to make way for new housing. Capelaw was one of three high rise flats built in Oxgangs Crescent in 1961 and 1962. The other two buildings (Caerketton Court and Allermuir Court) were demolished in November 2006. The demolition of Capelaw Court was filmed and featured on the National Geographic Channel, which interviewed residents of Oxgangs and community leader Heather Levy.

Two neighbouring primary schools situated on Oxgangs Green (Comiston and Hunters Tryst) were recently merged and renamed Pentland Primary. At first the Comiston pupils moved into the building formerly known as Hunters Tryst alongside current Tryst pupils while Comiston was renovated and a year later all staff and children moved permanently into the refurbished Comiston building, now known as Pentland Primary.

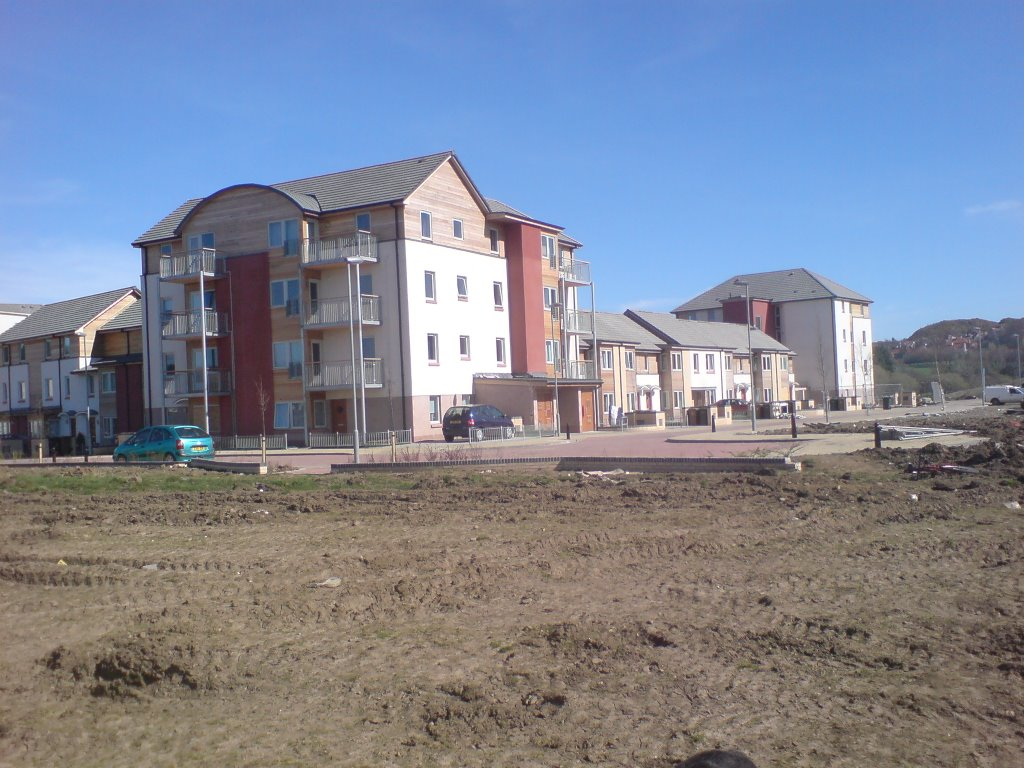
Firrhill Park

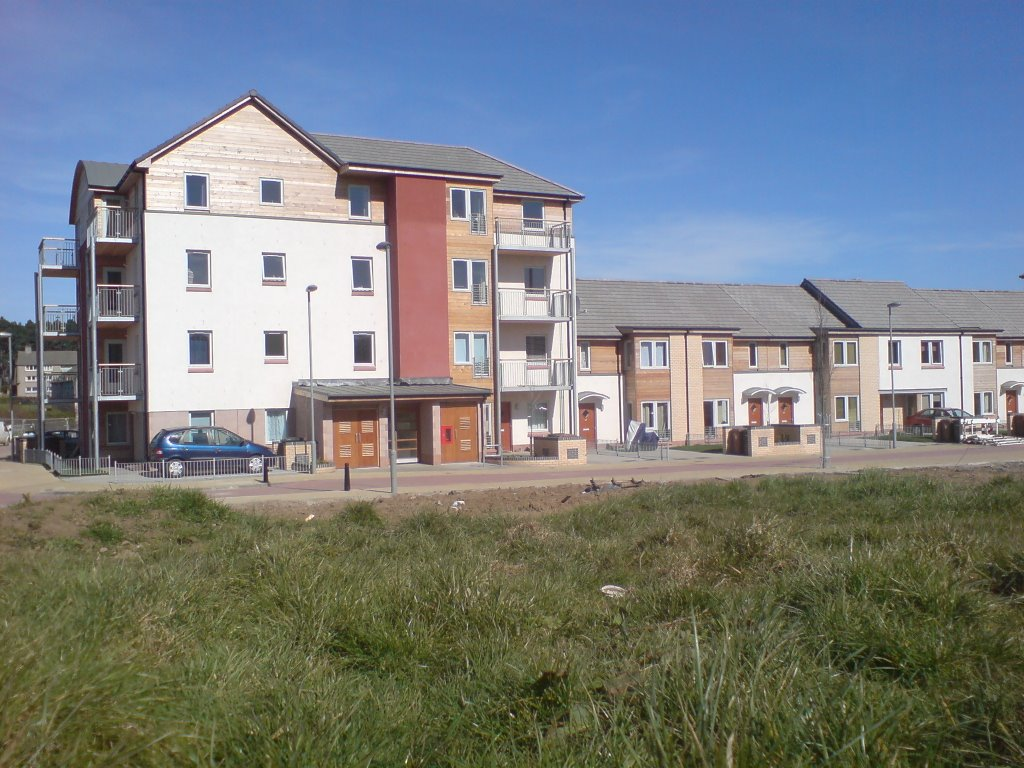

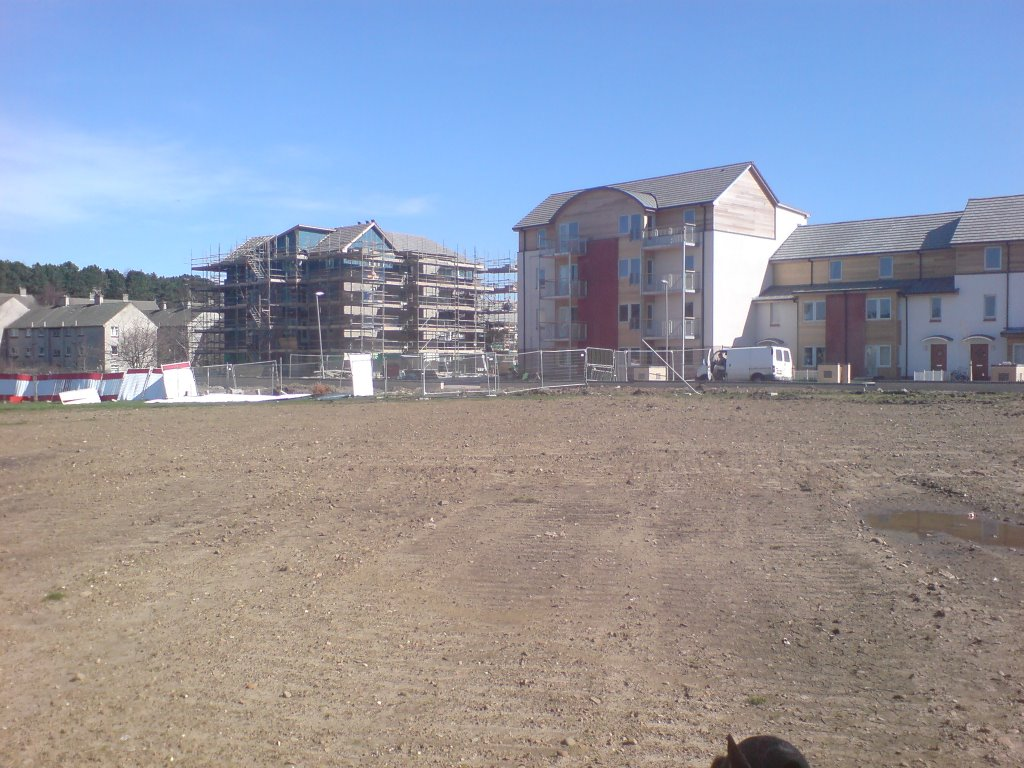

== Public transport ==
Public transport is frequent with Lothian Buses operating chartered services. Bus routes 4, 5, 16, airport service 18, 27, and night service N16, and an airport night service 18 (at 3am) Only to the Airport all serve the area.

== See also ==
- Oxgangs high rise flats
- Firrhill

== Books ==
- 2020: OXGANGS A Capital Tale Volume 1 ISBN 979-8418781314
- 2020: OXGANGS A Capital Tale Volume 2 ISBN 979-8419178540
- 2019: Paradise Lost - The Edinburgh Oxgangs School Summer Holidays 1958-1972 ISBN 978-1089483045
- 2018: Oxgangs - A Pastime From Time Past: Spirits Across The Air ISBN 978-1725718630
- 2021: Two Worlds The Story Of An Edinburgh Doctor ISBN 979-8481599687
