= Fairmilehead =

District of Edinburgh, Scotland

Coordinates: 55°54′4.42″N 3°12′12.05″W

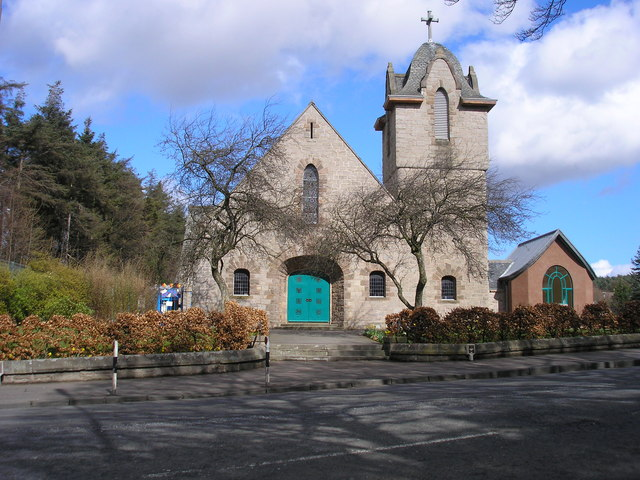
- Fairmilehead Parish Church

- Location within the City of Edinburgh council area Location within Scotland
- OS grid reference: NT248682
- Council area: City of Edinburgh
- Lieutenancy area: Edinburgh
- Country: Scotland
- Sovereign state: United Kingdom
- Post town: EDINBURGH
- Postcode district: EH10
- Dialling code: 0131
- Police: Scotland
- Fire: Scottish
- Ambulance: Scottish
- UK Parliament: Edinburgh South
- Scottish Parliament: Edinburgh Pentlands

Fairmilehead is a district of southern Edinburgh, Scotland. It lies approximately 3 miles (5 km) due south of the city centre and borders Midlothian. The area comprises the neighbourhoods of Buckstone, Caiyside, Caiystane, Swanston, Frogston and Winton. The centre of the area is the crossroads between Buckstone Terrace/Biggar Road and Frogston Road/Oxgangs Road where Fairmilehead Parish Church, a parish church of the Church of Scotland, is located.

This area contains some of the most expensive houses in Edinburgh, with an average home value of £562,806 and the most expensive streets being Frogston Road West (average £810,000), Margaret Rose Crescent (£856,000) and Galachlaw Shot (£815,276). In 2017, the area was named by the Edinburgh Evening News as being in the top four 'happiest places to live in Edinburgh', with a 96% satisfaction rate.

The eastern part of Fairmilehead contained the Princess Margaret Rose Orthopaedic Hospital from 1932 to 2002, when it was demolished to make way for new housing. Recently, the Scottish Water Fairmilehead water treatment works have been converted into housing built by Cala and David Wilson Homes. Scottish Water retain offices there, adjacent to the Charwood Grill restaurant (previously Tusitala Italian restaurant, which was named in recognition of Robert Louis Stevenson's connections with the area).

The local school catchment areas are Buckstone Primary, Pentland Primary (non-denominational) and St Peter's RC Primary and for secondary schools Boroughmuir High, Firrhill High (non-denominational) and St Thomas Aquin's RC.

The area is represented by:

- Scottish Parliament by Gordon MacDonald MSP (Scottish National Party),
- United Kingdom Parliament (Westminster) by Ian Murray MP (Labour)
- On the City of Edinburgh Council (Colinton/Fairmilehead ward) by Cllrs Conor Savage (Labour), Neil Cuthbert (Conservative) and Jason Rust (Conservative)

== Notable residents ==
Scottish chamber pop singer Hamish Hawk grew up in Fairmilehead.

== Demographics ==
Ethnicity	Colinton/Fairmilehead Ward	Edinburgh
White	90.1%	84.9%
Asian	5.1%	8.6%
Black	1.4%	2.1%
Mixed	1.4%	2.5%
Other	2.0%	1.9%
