= Firrhill High School =

Coordinates: 55°54′52.51″N 3°14′10.86″W

Location
- 9 Oxgangs Road North; Edinburgh, EH14 1DP; Scotland

Information
- Type: State Secondary
- Motto: Air carraig
- Established: 1960
- Local authority: City of Edinburgh Council
- Department for Education URN: 5532639 Tables
- Head teacher: Graham Hamilton
- Staff: 121 approx
- Enrolment: 1331 approx
- Grades: S1 to S6
- Website: http://firrhillhigh.org/

Firrhill High School is a secondary school located in the south-west of Edinburgh, Scotland. The school was established in 1960, and was officially opened by the city's lord provost. The school has around 1123 pupils and a teaching staff roll of around 121. The school serves areas such as: Oxgangs, Colinton Mains, Colinton Village, Bonaly, Fairmilehead, Buckstone, Craiglockhart and Longstone.

In 2001, the school underwent drastic refurbishing work, with several run-down buildings dating from the 1960s being either refurbished or demolished with new buildings built in their place. Work was completed in mid-2005, and the school was refurbished by a private finance initiative.

== Headteacher ==
The current headteacher is Graham Hamilton.

== Notable alumni and teachers ==
=== Alumni ===
- Jennifer Dodds, a pupil from 2003-2009, is a Team GB curler who won a gold metal in the Women's Team Curling at the Beijing Winter Olympic Games in 2022.
- Dougie Fife, a pupil at Firrhill in the 2000s, is a rugby union player with over 120 appearances for Edinburgh Rugby and represented Scotland in under 20s, 7s and national team. Dougie currently plays in the US Major League Rugby competition.
- Robbie Foy, formerly of Liverpool F.C. and Scunthorpe United FC, is a former pupil of the school. Foy, Sives and Vita represented Scotland Schoolboys in 2000 and 2001 respectively whilst at the school and all three played in the Victory Shield.
- Keanna Macinnes, a pupil in the 2010s, is a Team GB swimmer who competed at the Paris Olympics Games in 2024.
- The pianist and composer Stuart Mitchell who discovered the musical symbols in Rosslyn Chapel and has been celebrated in the Classic FM Hall of Fame for 15 years was a former pupil at Firrhill High School.
- Sarah Tait, a pupil in the 2010s, is a Scottish runner who holds the Scottish record for the 3000m steeplechase.

=== Staff ===
- The Scottish actress and comedian Elaine C. Smith was a drama teacher at the school in the early-1980s.
- Margot Wells, the elite athletics coach, and the wife of 100-metre gold medallist Allan Wells, taught physical education at Firrhill in the late 1970s.

== Her Majesty's Inspectorate of Education ==
On 13 June 2006, Her Majesty's Inspectorate of Education reported on the school. The inspectors identified as key strengths "The coherent and progressive programme of enterprise activities from S1-S6" and "The high standards of attainment at S5/S6". The report also commended the strong direction given by the Head Teacher Karen Prophet. The Report also commended the condition of the school saying that the school was well-designed and had good specialist teaching areas and had good social areas for pupils.

HM Inspectorate of Education issued a follow-up report on 22 April 2008. The report identified "good" or "very good" progress regarding all the items identified for action in the 2006 inspection report, and found no need to conduct further follow-up inspections.
