= Firrhill =

Suburb of Edinburgh, Scotland

Coordinates: 55°54′47″N 3°13′56″W

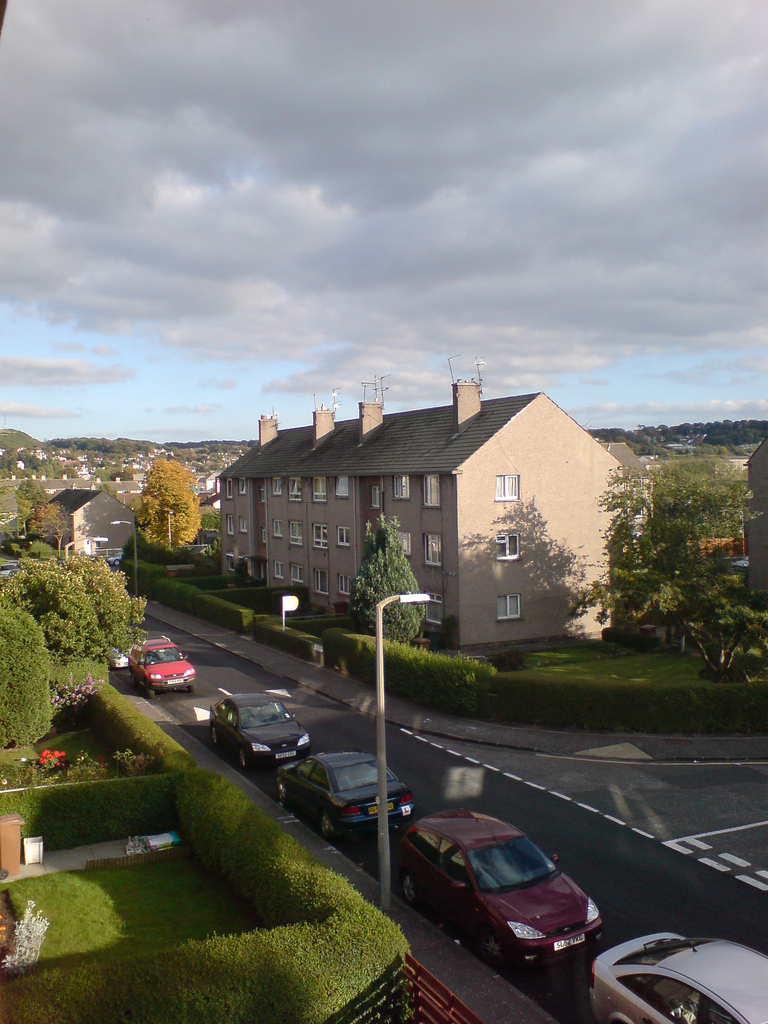

Firrhill is a suburb of Edinburgh, the capital of Scotland. It is south of Merchants of Edinburgh Golf Club and lies next to Oxgangs.

The area is mostly made up of public housing which was built by the Corporation Housing Department in the mid-1950s, however most of the council properties have now been bought by tenants using the right to buy scheme although a fairly large number of these are rented out privately by individual landlords.

Firrhill High School lies in the area.

== Sources ==
(Google Maps)
