= John Chalmers (surgeon) =

Scottish orthopaedic surgeon

John Chalmers (born 21 September 1927 in Aberdeen) is a Scottish orthopaedic surgeon.

== Biography ==
Chalmers studied medicine at the University of Edinburgh. After qualifying as MB ChB in 1950 he worked as House officer in different hospitals. In 1952 he joined the Royal Army Medical Corps and became a Fellow of the Royal College of Surgeons of England one year later. From 1954 to 1957 he had his orthopaedic education at the Royal National Orthopaedic Hospital. He spent an Orthopaedic Fellowship at the University of Illinois and in 1958 was appointed as Lecturer at the University of Edinburgh. In 1961 he graduated M.D. and in 1963 also qualified as Fellow of the Royal College of Surgeons of Edinburgh.

For a period of 32 years he was Senior Lecturer and Consultant at the (old) Royal Infirmary of Edinburgh and at the Princess Margaret Rose Orthopaedic Hospital. He was an examiner for the Fellowship of the Royal College of Surgeons of Edinburgh and the FRCS Ed Orth. and for the M. Ch. Orth. of Liverpool University. In 1982 he was elected a member of the Aesculapian Club.

With his wife Gwyneth he has four children and six grandchildren.

== Memberships of Professional Associations ==
- President of the British Orthopaedic Association 1989-90
- President of the British Orthopaedic Research Society

== National Committees ==
- Specialist Advisory Committee in Orthopaedic Surgery.
- Scottish Bone Tumour Registry
- Medical Research Council Committee on Osteoporosis
- Surgical representative on the Merit Award Committee for Scotland

== Visiting Professorships and Lectureships ==
- Auckland University
- Dalhousie University
- Hong Kong University
- Hadassah Medical Center (British Council Fellow)
- Basrah University
- Pakistan (World Health Organization visitor)
- Black Lion Hospital, Addis Ababa

== Editorial Boards ==
- Journal of Bone and Joint Surgery
- Journal of the Royal College of Surgeons of Edinburgh
- Journal of the Western Pacific Orthopaedic Association
- Journal of Orthopaedics
- Clinical Orthopaedics and Related Research
- Scottish Medical Journal

== Papers (selection) ==
- March haemoglobinuria. British Journal of Surgery 44 (1957), 394
- Transplantation immunity in bone homografting. Journal of Bone and Joint Surgery 41-B (1959), 160–179
- The growth of transplanted foetal bones in different immunological environments. JBJS 44-B (1962), 149–164
- Cancellous bone: its strength and changes with ageing and an evaluation of some methods for measuring its mineral content.
  - I Age changes in cancellous bone. JBJS 48-A (1966), 289–299
  - II An evaluation of some methods for measuring osteoporosis. JBJS 48-A (1966), 299–308
- Bone transplantation. Journal of Clinical Pathology, 20 (1967), 540–550.
- Osteomalacia – a common disease in elderly women. JBJS 49-B (1967), 403–423
- Peripheral compression lesions of the ulnar nerve. JBJS 50-B (1968), 793–803
- Quantitative measurements of osteoid in health and disease. Clinical Orthopaedics 63 (1969), 196–209
- Geographical variations in senile osteoporosis. JBJS 52-B (1970), 667–675
- Observations on the induction of bone in soft tissues. JBJS 57-B (1975), 36–45
- Unusual causes of peripheral nerve compression. The Hand 19 (1978), 168–175
- Aneurysmal bone cysts of the phalanges. The Hand, 13 (1981), 296–300
- Spontaneous healing of aneurysmal bone cysts. JBJS 67-B (1985), 310–312
- Osteosarcoma (Editorial). Lancet (1985), 131–133
- Recent Advances in Great Britain (Editor). Clinical Orthopaedics (1986), 210
- Fractures of the Femoral Neck in Elderly Patients with hyperparathyroidism. Clinical Orthopaedics 229 (1988), 125–130
- Tumours of the musculo-skeletal system: clinical presentation. Clinical Orthopaedics 2 (1988), 135–140
- Orthogerontics (Editorial). Journal of Orthopaedic Surgery 4 (1996), 7–8
- Treatment of Ruptures of the Tendo-Achilles (Review Article). Journal of Orthopaedic Surgery 2000

== Nonmedical Books ==
- Audubon in Edinburgh. Edinburgh 2003
- Andrew Duncan, Physician of the Enlightenment. Edinburgh 2010
- Duel Personalities: James Stuart versus Sir Alexander Boswell. Edinburgh 2014
