= Swanston, Edinburgh =

Village near Edinburgh, Scotland

Coordinates: 55.892316°N 3.2165936°W

Swanston
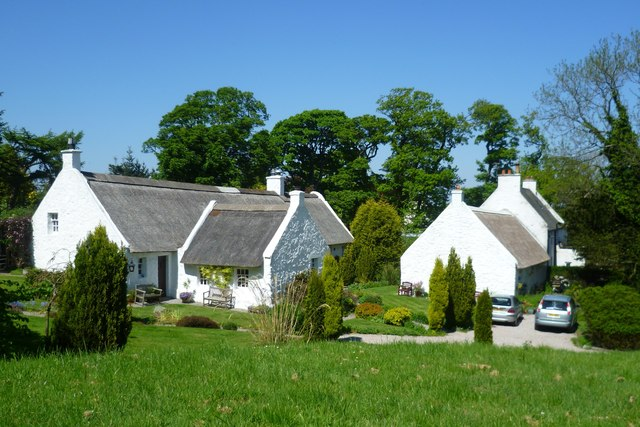
- Swanston Cottages

- Location within the City of Edinburgh council area Location within Scotland
- Population: 75
- OS grid reference: NT240672
- Council area: City of Edinburgh
- Country: Scotland
- Sovereign state: United Kingdom
- Post town: Edinburgh
- Postcode district: EH10
- Dialling code: 0131
- Police: Scotland
- Fire: Scottish
- Ambulance: Scottish
- UK Parliament: Edinburgh South West
- Scottish Parliament: Edinburgh Pentlands

Swanston is a village and residential area on the southern edge of Edinburgh, Scotland, noted for its picturesque thatched cottages set around an informal village green. Because of its relatively isolated position at the foot of the Pentland Hills, it has remained largely unaffected by commercial or suburban development.

The village grew up in the 18th century, originally to provide accommodation for farm workers on Swanston Farm. The farm, in turn, can trace its origins back at least to the 13th century and possibly earlier. The area has also played a role in supplying Edinburgh with fresh water. Its most notable resident was the young Robert Louis Stevenson, whose family leased a holiday home in the village during the late 19th century.

== Location ==
Swanston is located on the southern edge of Edinburgh, immediately to the south of the Edinburgh City Bypass and at the foot of the Pentland Hills. It is about 7.5 kilometres (5 miles) from the city centre, and about 180 m (590 ft) above sea level. The village lies within the boundaries of the Colinton and Fairmilehead local government ward (Ward 8), the Fairmilehead Community Council, the Pentland Hills Regional Park and the Swanston Conservation Area.

The village is surrounded by woods, open farmland and a golf course. The only vehicle access is by means of a single metalled road (Swanston Road). This terminates at a gate at the highest point in the village, beyond which the route continues as a rough track leading up into the hills. Visitors' vehicles are not permitted in the centre of the village. These factors have all helped maintain Swanston as a picturesque area, somewhat isolated from the rest of the city and largely unaffected by commercial or suburban development.

The name Swanston is also applied to an area of modern housing, built in the 1980s and 1990s, just to the north of the City Bypass. This is separate from the original village and lies outside the Regional Park and Conservation Area.

== History ==
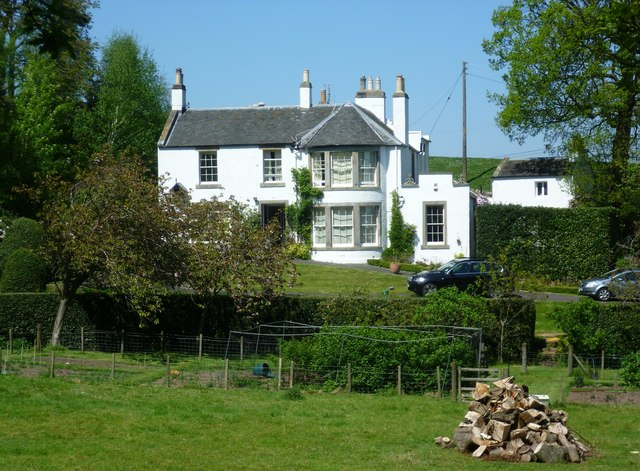
Swanston Cottage

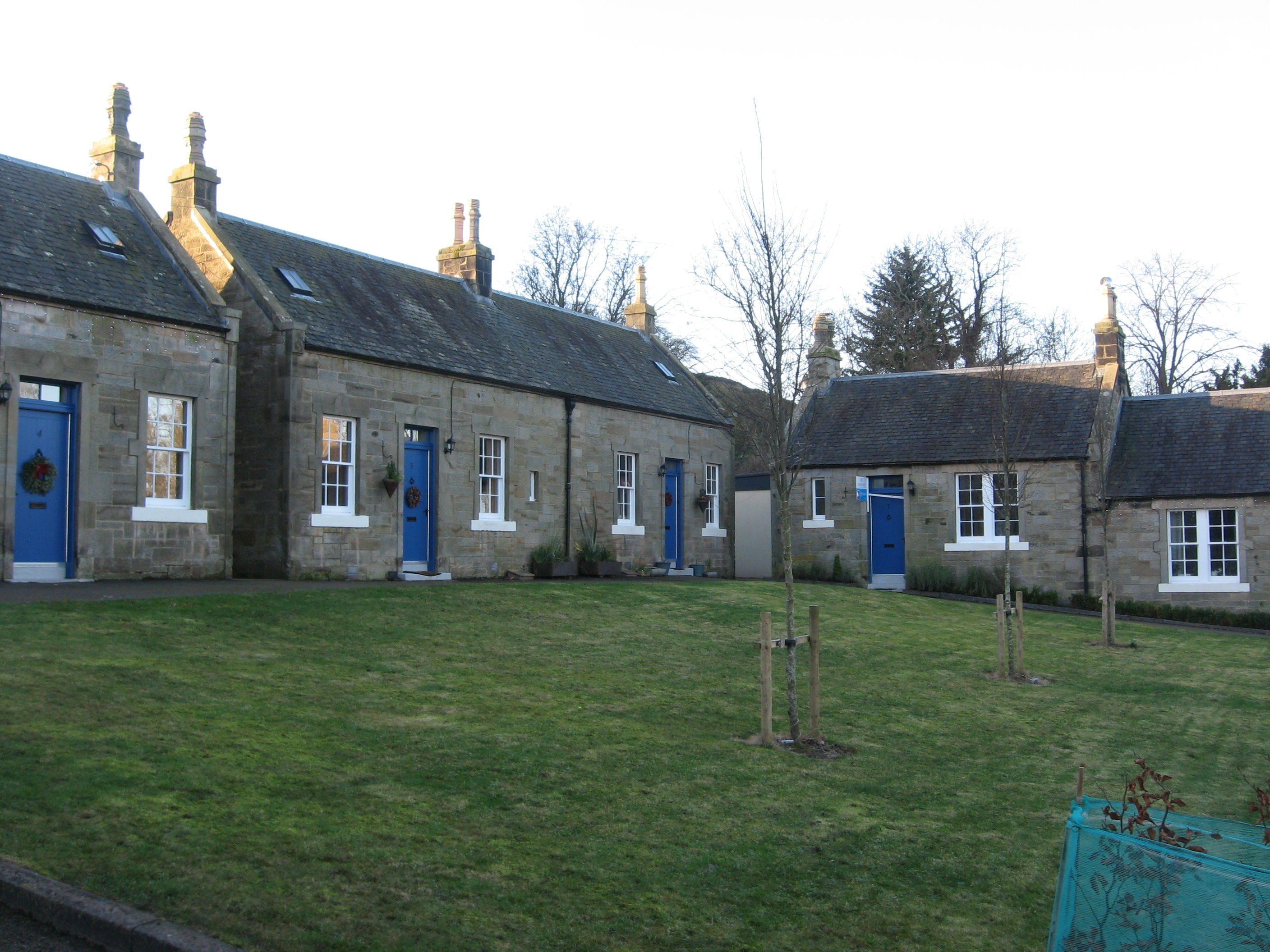
Stone cottages dating from the late 19th Century

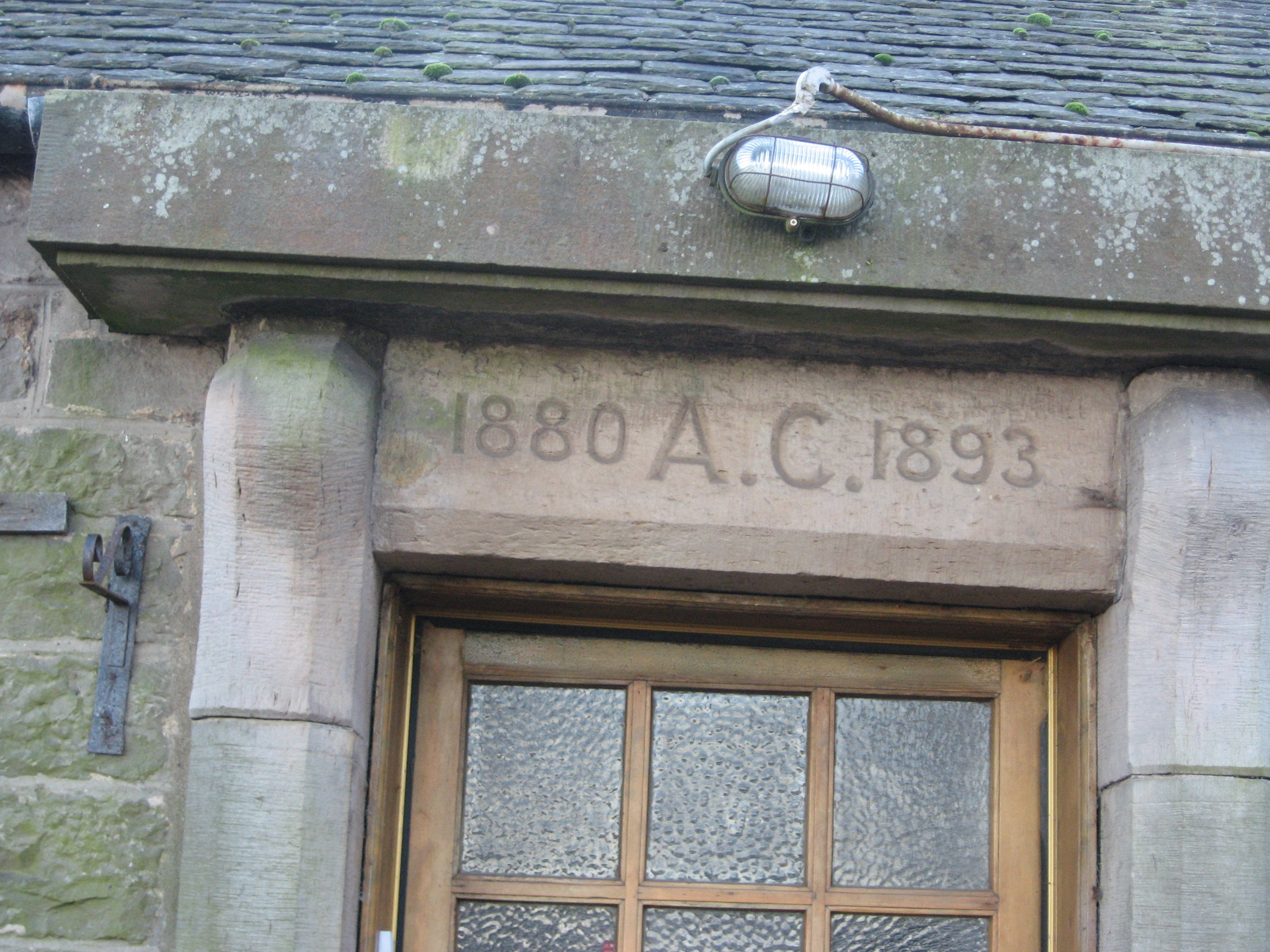
The lintel above the door of the waterman's cottage commemorating Alison Cunningham

The name Swanston is thought to be derived from Old Norse Sveins tún, meaning Sveinn's enclosure or farm. It first appears in a document of 1214, referring to Sveinn's farm within the Barony of Redhall. There is some evidence that the farming estate dates back to the 9th century.

The name also appears in 14th century charters granted in the reign of David II. It is listed as part of land owned by Knights Templars who had settled at Temple in what is now Midlothian in the 12th century. Further evidence of the Templars' association with Swanston is found in a charter granted by James VI in 1614 which lists all their possessions in Scotland, including a reference to terras templaris de Swainstoun possess.

In the 16th century, the area consisted of two large farms, situated on either side of a cart track along the line of the present Swanston Road. Easter Swanston was the property of the Ross family. Wester Swanston originally belonged to Sir John Cockburn and later by the Foulis family of Colinton. In 1670, the two farms were united under the ownership of the Trotters of Mortonhall.

The present village began to take shape in the early 18th century with the construction of a substantial three-storey farmhouse, a group of thatched farm workers' cottages and a school house. These buildings were built around an informal green through which flows a small burn. A group of eight stone cottages with slate roofs, on three sides of a communal green, was added in the late 19th century.

By the middle of the 20th century, the thatched cottages were considered uninhabitable. They still had their original earth floors; running water was not installed until 1934; and electricity only reached the village in 1947. In 1956, Edinburgh's City Architect initiated an ambitious programme to renovate the cottages. These were subsequently let to tenants, initially at rents of between £150 and £200 per year, but most were purchased by their tenants when Right to Buy legislation was introduced in the 1980s. Today they are the only surviving thatched buildings in the Lothians. The restoration earned a Scottish Civic Trust Commendation in 1964. The farmhouse and the school house have also been renovated and are now private residences.

=== Edinburgh's water supply ===
From the 1760s, Swanston played a role in supplying the population of Edinburgh with fresh water. A 1758 Act of Parliament had given Edinburgh Corporation the right to extract water from springs in the area to increase the supply of fresh water to the town. This measure was vigorously opposed by the land owner, Henry Trotter, who claimed that he needed the water for his own use. Trotter started legal action to enforce his claim, ending in an unsuccessful appeal to the House of Lords in May 1760. The Corporation proceeded to lay wooden pipes to carry water from several of the springs. A cistern house, three sand filter beds and a cottage for the water engineer were constructed; these can all still be seen, situated about 150 m (164 yd) to the west of Swanston Road.

After the engineer's cottage was built, the Corporation decided that they needed further accommodation to serve as a general meeting house. To fill that need, a small, single-storey thatched cottage was built on high ground a short distance to the north west. This became known as Swanston Cottage.

According to Robert Louis Stevenson, "after [the city fathers] had built their water-house and laid their pipes, it occurred to them that the place was suitable for junketing. Once entertained, with jovial magistrates and public funds, the idea led speedily to accomplishment; and Edinburgh could soon boast of a municipal Pleasure House".

=== Associations with Robert Louis Stevenson ===
Between 1867 and 1880, Robert Louis Stevenson's family held a lease on Swanston Cottage, which they used as a summer holiday home. The house had by then been modernised and enlarged, with the addition of a second storey, bow windows, a single-story extension, and a slate roof to replace the original thatch.

During the family's tenancy, the young Robert Louis Stevenson made frequent use of the cottage, being attracted by the quiet country life and the feeling of remoteness. It is likely that the time he spent there influenced his later writing as well as his wider outlook on life, particularly his love of nature and of wild places. The house and its romantic location are thought to have inspired several of his works.

Swanston Cottage itself appears in Stevenson's unfinished novel, St. Ives. It is where the title character, a French prisoner of war, seeks shelter after escaping from Edinburgh Castle. He later obtains help from two drovers, Simms and Candlish, who were probably based on John Todd, a Swanston shepherd with whom Stevenson enjoyed a lasting friendship.

Stevenson's nurse, Alison Cunningham (known as Cummy), stayed with the Stevensons in Swanston Cottage. After the family gave up the tenancy in 1880, she stayed on in Swanston, living in the home of her brother, who was the waterman. A lintel above the door of the waterman's cottage bears a faded inscription, '1880 AC 1893', to commemorate her time there. She died in 1913.

=== Swanston Golf Club ===
In 1927, Miss Margaret Carswell, a prominent member of the Edinburgh Women's Athletic Club, finding it nearly impossible for women to obtain membership of local golf clubs, decided to create her own ladies-only golf course. Using land leased from Swanston Farm, she proceeded to lay out a nine-hole course to the west of the village. She later reluctantly agreed to abolish the ladies-only rule, mainly as a result of pressure from her own members. This resulted in a rapid increase in membership which allowed the club to expand to 18 holes and to add a pavilion. By 1947, the total membership had risen to four hundred, with men outnumbering women by three to one.

From 1893 to 2013, the Lothianburn Golf Club occupied land to the east of the village. One of the club's most distinguished members was Tommy Armour, who won several major championships in the 1920s and 1930s, despite being partially blinded in World War I. When the club closed in 2013, the Swanston Golf Club took over part of its course.

== Swanston today ==
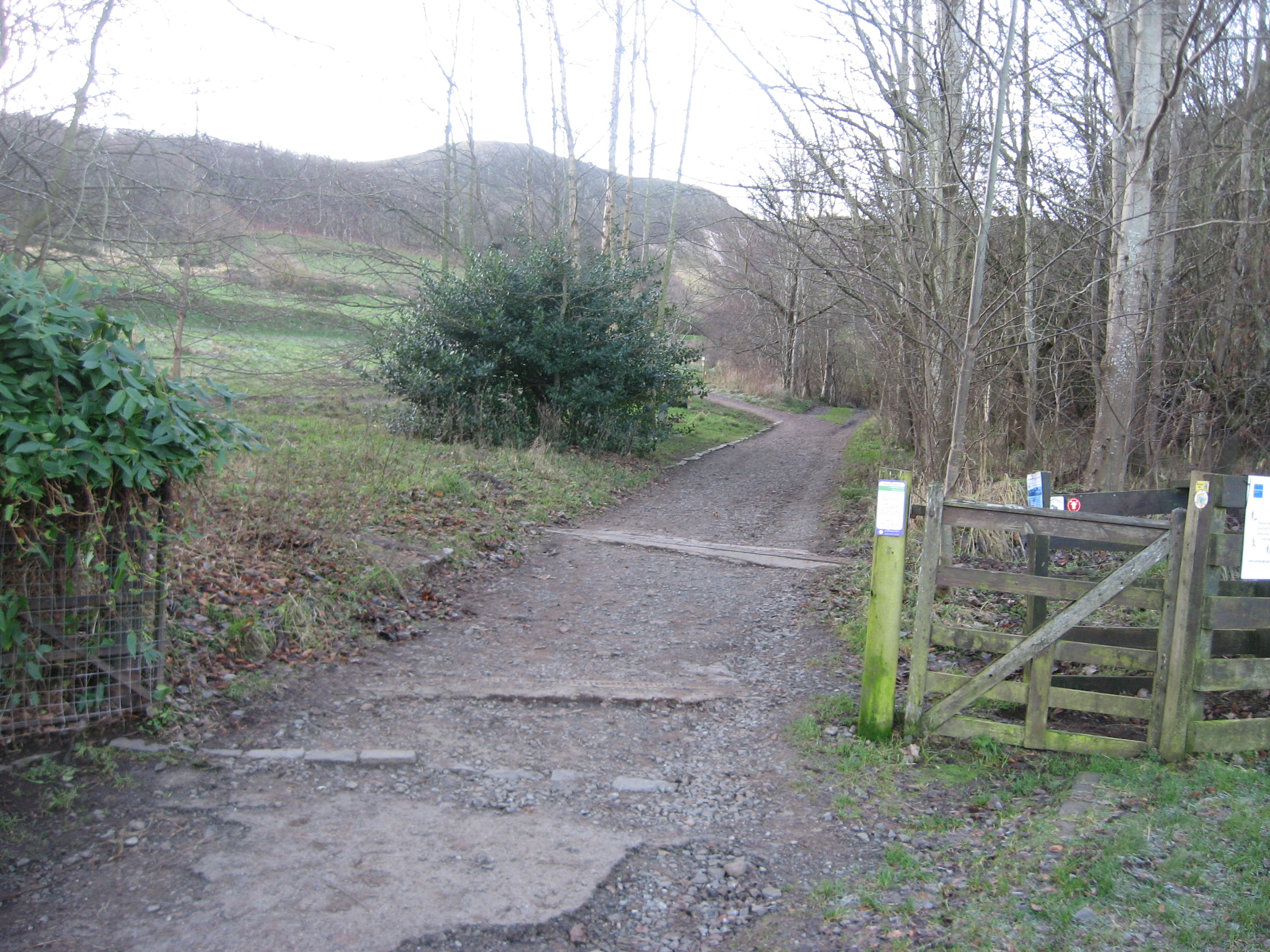
The path from the top of the village into the Pentland Hills

Today Swanston retains its feeling of isolation and remoteness. The village has no shop, café, pub, school or church and no specific visitor attractions. However it is often busy with walkers who pass through the village on their way to the Pentland Hills, particularly to the summits of Allermuir (493 m) and Caerketton (478 m).

The population of the village is estimated to be 75.

Swanston Farm is the largest business in the area. Since the 1970s, the farm, along with the land occupied by the two golf courses, has been in the ownership of the McClung family, who had been tenant farmers on the land since the 1930s.

Swanston Farm is also the base of the Edinburgh University Exmoor Pony Trekking Section, a student-run body which organises pony trekking for students and the general public.

=== Proposed leisure complex ===
In 2019, Hillend Leisure Ltd. (a joint venture of Swanston Farm and Advie Properties Ltd.) announced plans to build a large-scale leisure complex on the site of the former Lothianburn Golf Club to the south and east of the village. This would include mountain bike trails, a zip wire, a campsite, glamping pods, a pump track, office suites, shops and a café. The project is opposed by the Friends of Swanston, who claim that it would irreversibly damage fragile wildlife habitats; increase noise, litter and antisocial behaviour; cause traffic congestion; damage the character of Swanston village; and set a precedent for building in conservation areas.
