= Areas of Edinburgh =

The Edinburgh urban area comprises the adjoined localities: Edinburgh, Musselburgh, and Wallyford.

This page lists residential areas in the urban area (settlement) which covers Edinburgh – the capital city of Scotland – and is located mainly in the City of Edinburgh council area and partly in East Lothian.

== Localities and Neighbourhood Partnerships ==
The City of Edinburgh council area is divided into 17 wards, which have been combined into four operational management areas termed "localities":

The four locality areas of the City of Edinburgh council area shown with the urban area boundary overlaid.

North East

- Leith
- Leith Walk
- Craigentinny/Duddingston
- Portobello/Craigmillar

South East

- City Centre
- Southside/Newington
- Morningside
- Liberton/Gilmerton

North West

- Almond
- Drum Brae/Gyle
- Corstorphine/Murrayfield
- Forth
- Inverleith

South West

- Sighthill/Gorgie
- Colinton/Fairmilehead
- Fountainbridge/Craiglockhart
- Pentland Hills

The localities are further divided into Neighbourhood Partnership (NP) Areas:

North East

- Leith NP
- Craigentinny and Duddingston NP
- Craigmillar and Portobello NP

South East

- City Centre NP
- South Central NP
- Liberton/Gilmerton NP

North West

- Almond NP
- Western Edinburgh NP
- Forth NP
- Inverleith NP

South West

- South West NP
- Pentlands NP

Two of the Neighbourhood Partnership areas, Almond NP and Pentlands NP, extend into the rural hinterland in the west of the City of Edinburgh council area, taking in villages such as Kirkliston and Ratho which are not part of the settlement of Edinburgh (however, Juniper Green, Baberton, Currie and Balerno are considered to be contiguous and are included). For the same reason, less than 50% of the North West and the South West localities' territory is with the urban area. to the east of the city, Musselburgh and Wallyford in East Lothian are considered to be contiguous with the main Edinburgh settlement and are also included in the urban area; however, other nearby localities such as Loanhead and Danderhall are not included (this may be adjusted in the future, particularly for Danderhall where 2020s housing developments at the former Edmonstone estate on the local authority boundary with Edinburgh will almost close the gap between the localities).

== Other definitions ==
=== Main areas ===
Residential areas can be situated inside or located across borders of the larger Neighbourhood Partnership areas or locality areas. The edges of the residential areas are generally defined by main roads, though actual lines on the ground are not defined precisely. The names of areas are often given to roads and streets in those areas, although this is not always the case.

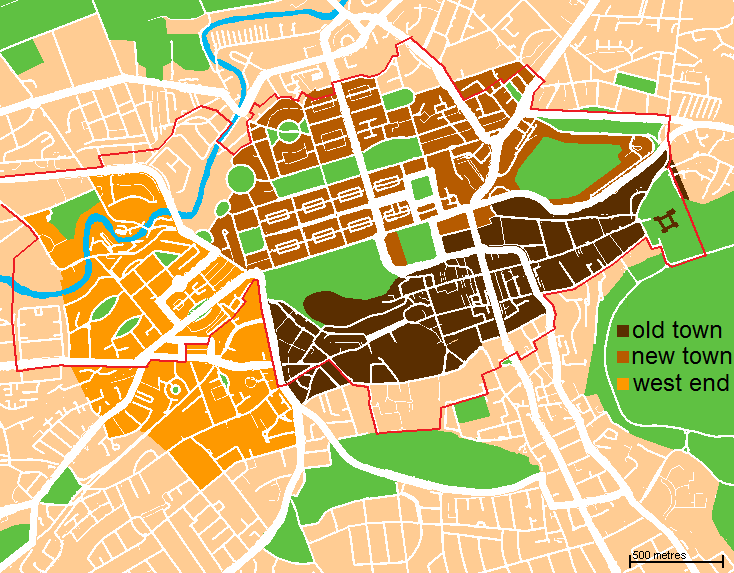
Map of the city centre, showing Old Town, New Town and West End.

Main residential areas of the Edinburgh urban area:

North East

- Abbeyhill
- Bingham
- Bonnington
- Broughton
- Brunstane
- Craigentinny
- Craigmillar
- Duddingston
- Easter Road
- Great Junction Street
- Joppa
- Leith
- Lochend
- Meadowbank
- Mountcastle
- Niddrie
- Northfield
- Piershill
- Pilrig
- Portobello
- Restalrig
- Willowbrae
- Western Harbour

North West

- Balgreen
- Barnton
- Blackhall
- Boswall
- Canonmills
- Cammo
- Carrick Knowe
- Clermiston
- Comely Bank
- Corstorphine
- Craigleith
- Cramond
- Crewe Toll
- Davidson's Mains
- Dean Village
- Drumbrae
- Drylaw
- East Craigs
- Goldenacre
- Granton
- Inverleith
- Muirhouse
- Murrayfield
- Newhaven
- Pilton
- Ravelston
- Silverknowes
- South Gyle
- Stockbridge
- Trinity
- Warriston

South East

- Alnwickhill
- Blackford
- Braid Hills
- Bruntsfield
- Burdiehouse
- Canongate
- Clovenstone
- Comiston
- Dumbiedykes
- Fernieside
- Gilmerton
- Gracemount
- Greenbank
- Greendykes
- Hillside and Calton Hill
- Liberton
- Marchmont
- Moredun
- Morningside
- Mortonhall
- New Town
- Newington
- Old Town
- Prestonfield
- Sciennes
- Southhouse
- Southside
- The Inch
- The Grange
- Tollcross
- West Coates
- West End

South West

- Baberton
- Balerno
- Bankhead
- Bonaly
- Broomhouse
- Chesser
- Colinton
- Currie
- Craiglockhart
- Dalry
- Fairmilehead
- Firrhill
- Fountainbridge
- Gorgie
- Greenhill
- Juniper Green
- Kingsknowe
- Longstone
- Merchiston
- Oxgangs
- Parkhead
- Polwarth
- Roseburn
- Saughton
- Shandon
- Sighthill
- Slateford
- Stenhouse
- The Calders
- Wester Hailes

East Lothian

- Musselburgh
  - Fisherrow
  - Inveresk
  - Levenhall
  - Monktonhall
  - Pinkie
  - Stoneybank
- Wallyford

=== Smaller areas ===
Smaller residential areas of the Edinburgh urban area:

- Ardmillan
- Bellevue
- Buckstone
- Bughtlin
- Caiystane
- Cameron Toll
- Church Hill
- Cleikimin
- Clerwood (Note: Listed as Corstorphine/Clerwood in ref.)
- Colinton Mains (Note: Listed as Colinton Mains and Firrhill in ref.)
- Constitution Street (Note: Listed as The Shore and Constitution Street in ref.)
- Craigcrook
- Craighouse (Note: Listed as Morningside and Craighouse in ref.)
- Craigmount (Note: Listed as Corstorphine/Craigmount in ref.)
- Craigour (Note: Listed as Moredun and Craigour in ref.)
- Dalkeith Road (Note: Listed as Newington and Dalkeith Road in ref.)
- Dalry Colonies
- Duddingston Village (Note: Listed as Willowbrae and Duddingston Village in ref.)
- Dumbryden
- Eastfield
- Ferniehill (Note: Listed as Fernieside/Ferniehill in ref.)
- Fettes
- Forrester
- Frogston
- Gayfield (Note: Listed as New Town East and Gayfield in ref.)
- Gilberstoun (Note: Listed as Brunstane/Gilberstoun in ref.)
- Gogarloch
- Granton Harbour
- Greenside
- Hawkhill Avenue (Note: Listed as Easter Road and Hawkhill Avenue in ref.)
- Haymarket
- Holy Corner
- Holyrood
- Hunter's Tryst
- Hutchison (Note: Listed as Hutchison/Slateford in ref.)
- Hyvots (Note: Listed as Hyvots and Gilmerton in ref.)
- Inglis Green (Note: Listed as Redhall/Inglis Green in ref.)
- Jock's Lodge
- Kaimes
- Lauriston
- Leith Links
- Leith Docks (Note: Listed as Western Harbour and Leith Docks in ref.)
- Little France
- Magdalene (Note: Listed as Bingham, Magdalene and The Christians in ref.)
- Marionville
- Maybury
- Mayfield (Note: Listed as Blackford, West Mains and Mayfield Road in ref.)
- Meadows (Note: Listed as Meadows and Southside in ref.)
- Murrayburn (Note: Listed as Murrayburn and Wester Hailes North in ref.)
- Newcraighall (Note: Listed as Jewel, Brunstane and Newcraighall in ref.)
- Niddrie House
- Niddrie Mains
- Niddrie Marischal
- North Gyle (Note: Listed as Corstorphine/North Gyle in ref.)
- Orchard Brae (Note: Listed as Craigleith, Orchard Brae and Crewe Toll in ref.)
- Parkgrove
- Powderhall (Note: Listed as Broughton North and Powderhall in ref.)
- Quartermile
- Redford
- Redhall
- Royston Mains (Note: Listed as Granton and Royston Mains in ref.)
- Salvesen (Note: Listed as Granton West and Salvesen in ref.)
- Saughton Mains (Note: Listed as Stenhouse and Saughton Mains in ref.)
- Saughtonhall (Note: Listed as Balgreen/Saughtonhall in ref.)
- Seafield
- Shaw Colonies
- Silvermills
- St Leonard's
- Stockbridge Colonies
- Swanston (Note: Listed as Comiston and Swanston in ref.)
- Telford
- The Christians
- The Dudleys (Note: Listed as Trinity East and The Dudleys in ref.)
- The Durhams (Note: Listed as Duddingston/The Durhams in ref.)
- The Jewel (Note: Listed as Jewel, Brunstane and Newcraighall in ref.)
- The Mound
- The Murrays (Note: Listed as Gilmerton South and the Murrays in ref.)
- The Shore
- Tynecastle
- Wardie (Note: Listed as Boswall/Wardie in ref.)
- Wardieburn (Note: Listed as Granton South and Wardieburn in ref.)
- West Craigs
- West Mains (Note: Listed as Blackford, West Mains and Mayfield Road in ref.)
- Westburn
- Wester Broom

== See also ==
- List of towns and cities in Scotland by population
