= List of places in Edinburgh =

See the list of places in Scotland for places in other counties.

This List of places in Edinburgh is a list of links for any inner city area, suburb, town, village, hamlet, castle, historic house, nature reserve, museum, art gallery, university, park, landmark and other place of interest in the City of Edinburgh council area of Scotland.

== A ==
- Abbeyhill
- Advocates Close
- Alnwickhill
- Ardmillan
- Arthur's Seat

== B ==
- Baberton
- Balerno
- Balgreen
- Balmoral Hotel
- Bankhead
- Barnbougle Castle
- Barnton
- Bavelaw Castle
- Bedlam Theatre
- Bellevue
- Bingham
- Blackford
- Blackford Hill
- Blackhall
- Bonaly
- Bonaly Country Park
- Bonnington
- Braid Hills
- Braid Burn
- Brass Founders' Pillar
- Bristo Square
- Broomhouse
- Broughton
- Brunstane
- Bruntsfield
- Bruntsfield Links
- Buccleuch
- Bughtlin
- Burdiehouse
- Burgh Muir
- Burghmuirhead
- Bute House

== C ==
- Cables Wynd House
- Caerketton Hill
- The Calders
- Calton Hill
- Camera Obscura
- Cameron Toll
- Cammo
- Canongate
- Canongate Kirk
- Canongate Tolbooth
- Canonmills
- Carrick Knowe
- Castle Rock
- Charlotte Square
- Chesser
- Church Hill
- Church Hill Theatre
- City Art Centre
- City Observatory
- Clermiston
- Clovenstone
- Colinton
- Collective Gallery
- Colony houses
- Comely Bank
- Comiston
- Corstorphine
- Corstorphine Hill
- Craigcrook
- Craigcrook Castle
- Craigentinny
- Craigentinny Marbles
- Craigievar
- Craigleith
- Craiglockhart
- Craiglockhart Hill
- Craiglockhart Castle
- Craigmillar
- Craigmillar Castle
- Craigour
- Cramond
- Cramond Island
- Cramond Lioness
- Cramond Roman Fort
- Cramond Tower
- Crewe Toll
- Currie
- Curriehill

== D ==
- Dalmahoy
- Dalmeny
- Dalmeny House
- Dalry
- Davidson's Mains
- Dean Cemetery
- Dean Gardens
- Dean Village
- Dugald Stewart Monument
- Drumbrae
- Drylaw
- Duddingston
- Duddingston Loch
- Dumbiedykes
- Dundas Castle
- Dynamic Earth (Edinburgh)

== E ==
- East Cairn Hill
- East Craigs
- Eastfield
- Edinburgh Airport
- Edinburgh Castle
- Edinburgh City Chambers
- Edinburgh College of Art
- Edinburgh Dungeon
- Edinburgh Festival Theatre
- Edinburgh International Climbing Arena
- Edinburgh International Conference Centre
- Edinburgh Napier University
- Edinburgh Park
- Edinburgh Playhouse
- Edinburgh Vaults
- Edinburgh Waverley railway station
- Edinburgh Wax Museum
- Edinburgh Zoo

== F ==
- Fairmilehead
- Ferniehill
- Fernieside
- Firrhill
- Forth Bridge
- Forth Road Bridge
- Forrester
- Fountainbridge
- Fruitmarket Gallery

== G ==
- George Square
- The Georgian House
- Gilmerton
- Gilmerton Cove
- Gogar
- Gogarloch
- Goldenacre
- Golfers Land
- Gorgie
- Gorgie-Dalry
- Governor's House
- Gracemount
- The Grange
- Granton
- Granton Garden
- Granton Waterfront regeneration
- Grassmarket
- Greenbank
- Greendykes
- Greenhill
- Greenside, Edinburgh
- Greyfriars Bobby Fountain
- Greyfriars Kirk

== H ==
- Haymarket
- Heriot-Watt University
- Hermiston
- Hermitage of Braid
- HMY Britannia
- Holy Corner
- Holyrood
- Holyrood Palace
- Holyrood Park
- The Hub
- Harmeny

== I ==
- The Inch
- Ingliston
- Inverleith
- Inverleith House

== J ==
- Jock's Lodge
- John Knox House
- Joppa
- Jordan Burn
- Juniper Green
- Jupiter Artland

== K ==
- Kaimes
- King's Gallery
- King's Theatre
- Kingsknowe
- Kirkliston

== L ==
- Lauriston
- Lauriston Castle
- Leith
- Lennox Tower
- Liberton
- Liberton Tower
- Little France
- Lochend
- Lochend House
- Lochend Park
- Lochrin
- London Road Gardens
- Longstone

== M ==
- Malleny House and Garden
- Marchmont
- Mary King's Close
- Maybury
- Mayfield
- Meadowbank
- The Meadows
- Melville Monument
- Merchiston
- Merchiston Tower
- The Mound
- Moray Estate
- Moredun
- Morningside
- Morton
- Mortonhall
- Mountcastle
- Muirhouse
- Murrayfield
- Museum of Childhood
- Museum of Edinburgh
- Museum on the Mound

== N ==
- National Library of Scotland
- National Monument of Scotland
- National Museum of Scotland
- National War Museum
- Nelson Monument
- New College
- New Town
- Newbridge
- Newcraighall
- Newhaven
- Newington
- Niddrie
- Northfield

== O ==
- Old College
- Old Town
- Oxgangs

== P ==
- Parkgrove
- Parkhead
- Parliament House
- Pentland Hills
- The People's Story Museum
- Piershill
- Pilrig
- Pilton
- Political Martyrs' Monument
- Polwarth
- Portobello
- Powderhall
- Prestonfield
- Princes Street Gardens

== Q ==
- Quartermile
- Queen's Hall

== R ==
- Raeburn Place
- Ratho
- Ratho Station
- Ravelston
- Ravelston Garden
- Redford
- Reid Concert Hall
- Restalrig
- Riccarton
- River Almond
- Roseburn
- Ross Fountain
- Royal Botanic Garden Edinburgh
- Royal Highland Centre
- Royal Lyceum Theatre
- Royal Observatory
- Royal Scottish Academy Building

== S ==
- Saughton
- Saughton Park
- Saughtonhall
- Sciennes
- Scotch Whisky Experience
- Scott Monument
- Scottish American Memorial
- Scottish National Gallery
- Scottish National Gallery of Modern Art
- Scottish National Portrait Gallery
- Scottish National War Memorial
- Scottish Parliament Building
- Scottish Poetry Library
- Scottish Storytelling Centre
- Seafield
- Shandon
- The Shore
- Sighthill
- Silverknowes
- Slateford
- South Gyle
- South Queensferry
- Southhouse
- St Andrew Square
- St Andrew's House
- St Cecilia's Hall
- St Giles' Cathedral
- St Leonard's
- St Mary's Cathedral (Catholic)
- St Mary's Cathedral (Episcopal)
- Statue of David Livingstone
- Stenhouse
- Stockbridge
- Surgeons' Hall
- Swanston

== T ==
- Talbot Rice Gallery
- Thistle Chapel
- Timber Bush
- Tollcross
- Torphin
- Traverse Theatre
- Trinity
- Turnhouse
- Tynecastle

== U ==
- University of Edinburgh
- Usher Hall

== V ==
- Victoria Quay
- Victoria Park

== W ==
- Warriston
- Water of Leith
- West Coates
- West Craigs
- West End
- Wester Broom
- Wester Hailes
- Western Harbour
- Witches' Well
- Writers' Museum

== See also ==
- List of places in Scotland
