= Drum Brae/Gyle (ward) =

Ward of Edinburgh, Scotland

Location of the ward within Edinburgh

Drum Brae/Gyle is one of the seventeen wards used to elect members of the City of Edinburgh Council. Established in 2007 along with the other wards, it currently elects three Councillors.

The ward covers an area in the far west of the city, bounded generally by Corstorphine Hill, the Queensferry Road (A90), Maybury Road (A902) and Edinburgh City Bypass (A720) roads, and the Glasgow–Edinburgh via Falkirk line railway; it includes the Bughtlin, Clermiston, Clerwood, Craigmount, Drumbrae, East Craigs, Gogarloch, Maybury, North Gyle, Parkgrove, South Gyle and West Craigs neighbourhoods, as well as the Edinburgh Park commercial district. A minor boundary change in 2017 caused the loss of the Wester Broom neighbourhood and the addition of Forrester with a negligible effect on the population, which in 2019 stood at 23,534.

== Councillors ==
Election	Councillors		
2007	Colin Keir (SNP)	Robert Aldridge (Liberal Democrats)	Jenny Dawe (Liberal Democrats)
2012	Ron Cairns (SNP)	Robert Aldridge (Liberal Democrats)	Karen Keil (Labour)
2017	Claire Bridgman (SNP)	Robert Aldridge (Liberal Democrats)	Mark Brown (Conservative)
2022	Euan Hyslop (SNP)	Robert Aldridge (Liberal Democrats)	Edward John Thornley (Liberal Democrats)

== Election results ==
=== 2022 election ===
Drum Brae/Gyle - 3 seats
Party	Candidate	FPv%	Count						
Party	Candidate	FPv%	1	2	3	4	5	6	7
Liberal Democrats	Robert Christopher Aldridge (incumbent)	42.2	3,988						
SNP	Euan Hyslop	23.9	2,263	2,345	2,349	2,355	2,655		
Conservative	Mark Brown (incumbent)	11.1	1,047	1,232	1,235	1,266	1,283	1,296	1,387
Liberal Democrats	Edward John Thornley	9.6	909	2,074	2,079	2,089	2,213	2,263	2,578
Labour	Nkechi Okoro	6.2	587	659	661	671	772	861	
Scottish Green	Anne Scott	5.9	554	595	599	616			
Scottish Family	Eileen Johnston	0.8	79	88	94				
Scottish Libertarian	Gary Smith	0.3	24	29					
Electorate: 18,822 Valid: 9,451 Spoilt: 109 Quota: 2,363 Turnout: 50.8%

=== 2017 election ===
2017 City of Edinburgh Council election

Drum Brae/Gyle Ward - 3 seats
Party	Candidate	FPv%	Count	
Party	Candidate	FPv%	1	2
Liberal Democrats	Robert Christopher Aldridge (incumbent)	33.5%	3,176	
SNP	Claire Bridgman	26.8%	2,541	
Conservative	Mark Brown	22.0%	2,084	2,411
Labour	Karen Ann Keil (incumbent)	13.3%	1,262	1,483
Scottish Green	Phyl Meyer	4.3%	411	521
Electorate: 18,321 Valid: 9,474 Spoilt: 82 Quota: 2,369 Turnout: 52.2%

On 17 July 2018, SNP councillor Claire Bridgman resigned from the party for undisclosed reasons and became an Independent.

=== 2012 election ===
2012 City of Edinburgh Council election

Drum Brae/Gyle Ward - 3 seats
Party	Candidate	FPv%	Count							
Party	Candidate	FPv%	1	2	3	4	5	6	7	8
Labour	Karen Keil	26.46%	1,981							
Liberal Democrats	Robert Aldridge (incumbent)	18.77%	1,405	1,425	1,431	1,490	1,636	1,695	1,735	2,312
SNP	Ron Cairns *	18.34%	1,373	1,383	1,386	1,406	1,466	2,052		
Conservative	Mark Brown	16.04%	1,201	1,207	1,212	1,233	1,349	1,370	1,383	
SNP	Alison Lindsay	8.66%	648	657	661	699	750			
Independent	Steven Binney	6.92%	518	532	588	663				
Scottish Green	Linda Hendry	3.62%	271	285	296					
Independent	John Scott	1.20%	90	95						
Electorate: 17,123 Valid: 7,487 Spoilt: 78 Quota: 1,872 Turnout: 7,565 (44.2%)

=== 2007 election ===
2007 City of Edinburgh Council election

2007 Council election: Drum Brae/Gyle Ward
Party	Candidate	FPv%	Count							
Party	Candidate	FPv%	1	2	3	4	5	6	7	8
Liberal Democrats	Robert Aldridge	25.2	2,630							
Liberal Democrats	Jenny Dawe	19.6	2,049	2,078.99	2,100.27	2,113.31	2,234.21	2,702.55		
SNP	Colin G Keir	18.4	1,917	1,920.20	1,939.32	1,956.32	2,018.71	2,263.43	2,287.23	2,725.43
Conservative	Steven Binney	16.1	1,676	1,679.60	1,684.67	1,687.67	1,716.86	1,865.21	1,889.87	
Labour	Cameron Day	14.8	1,545	1,549.01	1,559.12	1,576.19	1,631.28			
Scottish Green	Fiona A Paterson	3.2	330	331.94	337.99	361.09				
Scottish Socialist	Iain Pendreich	0.8	88	88.24	89.26					
Liberal	Roy Isserlis	0.8	85	85.84						
Electorate: 17,364 Valid: 10,320 Spoilt: 113 Quota: 2,581 Turnout: 60.1%
