= Liberton/Gilmerton (ward) =

Electoral ward in Edinburgh, Scotland

Location of the ward within Edinburgh

Liberton/Gilmerton is one of the seventeen wards used to elect members of the City of Edinburgh Council. Established in 2007 along with the other wards, it elects four Councillors.

As its name suggests, the ward's territory is based around the communities of Gilmerton and Liberton in the far south-east of the city's urban area up to the boundary with Midlothian, also including Alnwickhill, Burdiehouse, Craigour, Ferniehill, Fernieside, Gracemount, The Inch, Kaimes, Moredun, Mortonhall and Southhouse, forming a suburban cluster that is almost physically separate from the rest of Edinburgh. A minor 2017 boundary change in the north of the ward saw the loss of Nether Liberton village, the Cameron Toll Shopping Centre and Inch Park, but the overall population increased slightly due to housebuilding in several other areas (Heritage Grange, The Limes, Manor Wood, South Gilmerton Brae, etc.). In 2019, the ward had a population of 35,480.

== Councillors ==
Election	Councillors			
2007	Conor Snowden (Liberal Democrats)	Norma M Hart (Labour)	Ian Murray (Labour)	Tom Buchanan (SNP)
2010 by	Conor Snowden (Liberal Democrats)	Norma M Hart (Labour)	Bill Cook (Labour)	Tom Buchanan (SNP)
2012	Nick Cook (Conservative)	Norma M Hart (Labour)	Bill Cook (Labour)	Tom Buchanan (SNP)
2013 by	Nick Cook (Conservative)	Norma M Hart (Labour)	Bill Cook (Labour)	Keith John Robson (Labour)
2017	Stephanie Smith (Conservative)	Lezley Marion Cameron (Labour)	Derek Howie (SNP)	Lesley MacInnes (SNP)
2022	Philip Doggart (Conservative)	Lezley Marion Cameron (Labour)	Martha Mattos Coelho (SNP)	Lesley MacInnes (SNP)

== Election results ==
=== 2022 election ===
Liberton/Gilmerton - 4 seats
Party	Candidate	FPv%	Count									
Party	Candidate	FPv%	1	2	3	4	5	6	7	8	9	10
Labour	Lezley Marion Cameron (incumbent)	27.5	3,419									
SNP	Lesley MacInnes (incumbent)	23.4	2,906									
Conservative	Philip Doggart (Note: Sitting councillor for Colinton/Fairmilehead.)	18.0	2,239	2,313	2,317	2,374	2,389	2,414	2,537			
Green	John Nichol	8.2	1,023	1,069	1,092	1,111	1,138	1,227	1,357	1,361		
SNP	Martha Mattos Coelho	7.3	910	942	1,300	1,317	1,369	1,451	1,484	1,485	2,103	2,558
Labour	Ishrat Measom	5.8	725	1,308	1,314	1,339	1,370	1,433	1,604	1,617	1,947	
Liberal Democrats	Madeleine Rani Frances Planche	4.1	507	548	551	565	580	608				
Scottish Socialist	Colin Fox	2.4	295	321	325	335	376					
Alba	Abu Meron	1.8	222	226	228	241						
Scottish Family	James Demare Christie	1.5	187	207	209							
Electorate: 28,977 Valid: 12,433 Spoilt: 232 Quota: 2,487 Turnout: 43.7%

=== 2017 election ===
2017 City of Edinburgh Council election

Liberton/Gilmerton - 4 seats
Party	Candidate	FPv%	Count					
Party	Candidate	FPv%	1	2	3	4	5	6
Labour	Lezley Marion Cameron	24.81%	2,911					
Conservative	Stephanie Smith	23.24%	2,726					
SNP	Derek Howie	17.49%	2,052	2,086	2,093	2,200	2,292	2,564
SNP	Lesley Macinnes	16.17%	1,913	1,931	1,938	2,095	2,168	2,401
Labour	Tim Pogson	7.46%	875	1,295	1,376	1,511	1,881	
Liberal Democrats	John Christopher Knox	5.52%	648	682	794	941		
Green	John Nichol	5.17%	606	617	637			
Electorate: 25,648 Valid: 11,731 Spoilt: 264 Quota: 2,347 Turnout: 11,995 (46.8%)

On 30 July 2020, councillor Derek Howie resigned from the SNP Group to become an Independent.

=== 2013 by-election ===
SNP councillor Tom Buchanan died on 3 April 2013. The by-election was held on 20 June 2013 and was won by Labour's Keith John Robson.

Liberton/Gilmerton By-election (20 June 2013)- 1 Seat
Party	Candidate	FPv%	Count						
Party	Candidate	FPv%	1	2	3	4	5	6	7
Labour	Keith John Robson	39.47	2,892	2,896	2,906	2,941	3,070	3,255	3,448
SNP	Derek Howie	30.69	2,249	2,251	2,256	2,287	2,403	2,523	2,633
Conservative	Stephanie Murray	11.23	823	824	836	903	934	1,098	
Liberal Democrats	John Christopher Knox	8.26	605	611	616	625	708		
Green	Alys Mumford	5.62	412	430	440	471			
UKIP	Jonathan Stanley	3.21	235	239	251				
Independent	John Scott	0.87	64	70					
Pirate	Phil Hunt	0.64	47						
Electorate: 24,177 Valid: 7,246 Spoilt: 81 Quota: 3,664 Turnout: 7,327 (30.6%)

=== 2012 election ===
2012 City of Edinburgh Council election

Liberton/Gilmerton - 4 seats
Party	Candidate	FPv%	Count							
Party	Candidate	FPv%	1	2	3	4	5	6	7	8
Labour	Norma Austin-Hart (incumbent)	21.4	1,941							
SNP	Tom Buchanan (incumbent)†	19.6	1,780	1,789	1,794	1,826				
Labour	Bill Cook (incumbent)	19.5	1,768	1,868						
Conservative	Nick Cook	12.3	1,111	1,112	1,115	1,124	1,125	1,171	1,455	1,696
SNP	Derek Howie	12.0	1,084	1,086	1,090	1,127	1,138	1,268	1,441	
Liberal Democrats	John Knox	7.6	687	689	694	711	711	848		
Green	Joan Carter	5.2	469	473	480	549	550			
Scottish Socialist	Colin Fox	2.5	228	229	233					
Electorate: 23,187 Valid: 9,068 Spoilt: 191 (2.06%) Quota: 1,814 Turnout: 9,259 (39.9%)

=== 2010 by-election ===
A by-election arose following the resignation of Ian Murray after his election as an MP on 6 May 2010. The seat was held by Labour's Bill Cook on 9 September 2010.

Liberton/Gilmerton By-Election (9 September 2010) - 1 seat
Party	Candidate	FPv%	Count
Party	Candidate	FPv%	1
Labour	Bill Cook	44.8	2,974
SNP	Richard Lewis	20.8	1,382
Conservative	Stephanie Murray	15.4	1,020
Liberal Democrats	John Christopher Knox	10.9	722
Green	Peter McColl	3.0	201
Scottish Socialist	Colin Fox	2.5	169
Independent	Mev Brown	1.9	128
Pirate	Philip Hunt	0.6	43
Electorate: 23,912 Valid: 6,639 Spoilt: 65 Quota: 3,320 Turnout: 6,704

=== 2007 election ===
2007 City of Edinburgh Council election

2007 Council election: Liberton/Gilmerton
Party	Candidate	FPv%	Count								
Party	Candidate	FPv%	1	2	3	4	5	6	7	8	9
SNP	Tom Buchanan	26.0	3,471								
Labour	Norma M Hart	18.9	2,524	2,610.82							
Labour	Ian Murray	15.8	2,104	2,142.45	2,143.08	2,156.82	2,176.04	2,207.78	2,252.96	2,356.10	2,569.78
Conservative	Gavin Easton	14.3	1,912	1,976.74	1,976.76	1,985.00	1,991.48	2,017.96	2,032.43	2,101.05	
Liberal Democrats	Conor Snowden	14.2	1,902	2,028.26	2,028.29	2,049.51	2,068.47	2,113.43	2,161.85	2,449.48	3179.72
Green	Joan E. Carter	3.5	464	589.02	589.04	605.50	639.44	639.44	788.50		
Scottish Socialist	Colin A Fox	1.6	208	265.30	265.31	268.05	310.22	330.45			
Independent	Max Volino	1.6	207	225.60	225.61	276.49	302.45				
Solidarity	John Wight	1.0	132	180.62	180.62	194.10					
Independent	Alex Scott	0.9	123	161.94	161.95						
Electorate: 24,133 Valid: 13,047 Spoilt: 306 Quota: 2,610 Turnout: 55.3%
