= Turnhouse =

Suburb of Edinburgh, Scotland

Coordinates: 55°57′N 3°20′W

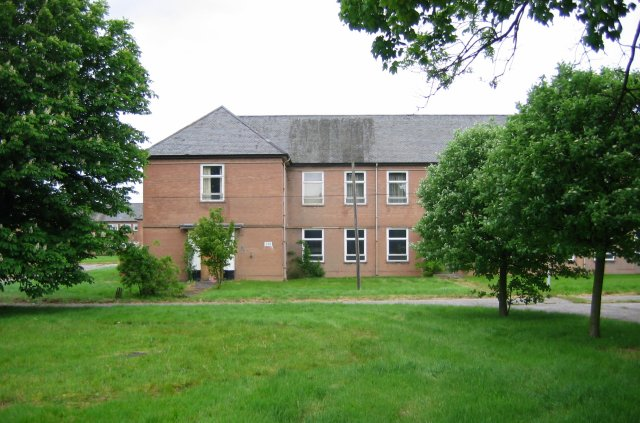
Remains of RAF Turnhouse

Turnhouse is a suburb in the Edinburgh, Scotland. It is located near to the villages of Maybury, Gogar, Cammo and West Craigs.

The area is south east of Edinburgh Airport, and Turnhouse is also the name for the former Royal Air Force base (RAF Turnhouse), now closed, which dates back to the First World War and was the origin of the current civilian airport. It is now used for cargo operations in tandem with the main Edinburgh Airport.

The then 1st Free French Squadron 340 "Ile-de-France" was located in Turnhouse during the Second World War, from 1941 to 1951, when it relocated to Orange, Vaucluse (France) under the name "Escadron de chasse 02.005 "Ile-de-France"" ("EC 2/5 "Ile-de-France"").

Turnhouse is the home of Turnhouse Golf Club at Lennie Park.
