= Wester Hailes Baptist Church =

Church in Edinburgh, Scotland

Coordinates: 55.91142°N 3.27718°W

Wester Hailes Baptist Church is a church in the Wester Hailes area of west Edinburgh, Scotland, founded in 1971.
