= Dumbiedykes =

Neighborhood of Edinburgh, Scotland

Coordinates: 55°56′56.28″N 3°10′40.44″W

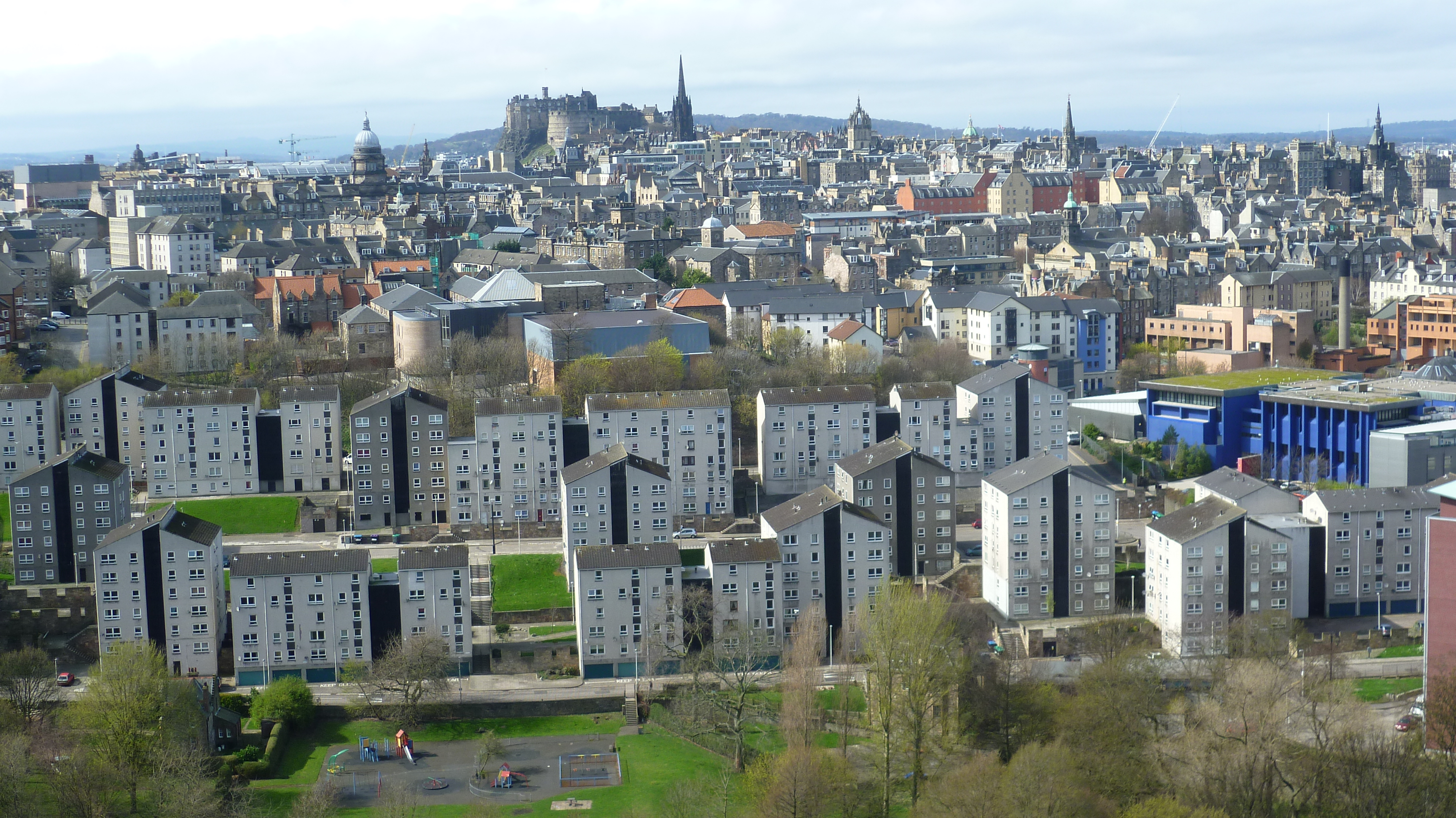
Dumbiedykes flats from Salisbury Crags

Dumbiedykes (/dʌmiːˈdaɪks/) is a residential area in the centre of Edinburgh, Scotland. It mainly comprises public housing developments.

It is bounded in the north by Holyrood Road, the west by the Pleasance and St Leonard's Street and the east by Holyrood Park.

== Etymology ==
The site housed Edinburgh's Deaf and Dumb School until the mid 19th century. The inhabitants of the school were known as the "dumbies", and the school "Dumbie House". From c.1820 the road passing the school building (from St. Leonards Street to the Canongate) became known as "Dumbie Dykes", Dykes referring to the walls bordering Holyrood Park. Within a few years, the whole local area came to be known as Dumbiedikes, Dumbie Dykes or Dumbies Dykes.

== History ==
Through the first part of the 20th century, the area was composed of tenement buildings many of which did not have internal toilet facilities. By the 1960s many of these buildings had become dilapidated, and resultingly the buildings were demolished and the tenants moved to new estates in Craigmillar, The Inch, Liberton, Prestonfield, Restalrig, Burdiehouse, Gracemount, Gilmerton and other areas of Edinburgh. Ian Rankin called the rebuilt tenement area "Greenfield" in his novel Dead Souls (1999):

Greenfield's tower blocks had been built in the 1960s and were showing their age. Dark stains bloomed on the discoloured harling. Overflow pipes dripped water on the cracked paving slabs. ... No council planner had ever lived here. No director of housing or community architect. All the council had done was move in problem tenants and tell everyone central heating was on the way.

Despite the area benefiting from a superficial building regeneration including modern flats, student residences, University of Edinburgh sports facilities and being popular area to live in due to its closeness to the centre of Edinburgh and its immediate proximity to the Scottish Parliament, when compared with other residential areas in central Edinburgh it still remains an economically impoverished part of the city, suffering from the associated aspects of social problems such as disproportionately high levels of unemployment along with drug and alcohol abuse.

== See also ==
- Holyrood, Edinburgh
