= Joseph Tillie =

Scottish physician and pharmacologist

Dr Joseph Tillie FRSE (20 January 1859 – 20 November 1898) was a 19th-century Scottish physician and pharmacologist with a special knowledge of "exotic poisons" such as curare.

== Life ==
He was born in Edinburgh on 20 January 1859, the son of Thomas Tillie, a relatively wealthy tailor with a shop at 369 High Street on the Royal Mile. The family lived at 11 Castle Terrace, a Georgian townhouse viewing onto Edinburgh Castle. He originally trained as a banker and worked as an accountant for the Union Bank of Scotland.

He first took a general degree at the University of Edinburgh, graduating in 1883, then continued at the university, studying medicine, and graduating in 1886 with an MB ChB with Honours. He spent some time as a pharmacologist, and was also assistant professor of Materia Medica at the University of Edinburgh under Professor Thomas Richard Fraser, also being Resident Physician at Edinburgh Royal Infirmary.

He lived at the Old Farm, Gilmerton just south of Edinburgh.

In 1888 he took leave for a year to do further technical studies in pharmacology at the University of Leipzig under Professor Boehm.

In 1893 he was elected a Fellow of the Royal Society of Edinburgh. His proposers were fellow physicians Sir Thomas Richard Fraser, Sir Andrew Douglas Maclagan, Alexander Crum Brown and Sir William Turner. At this time he had returned to the family house at Castle Terrace (presumably inherited from his father), but also had a property at 7 Kew Terrace.

He stepped down from his multiple roles in 1895 due to ill-health and moved to Springfontein in South Africa to recover. He died in East London on 28 November 1898, aged 38, following a strenuous sea journey. His wife appears to have circulated the tale that he died in South Africa in order to pursue her desire to continue to live there.

== Family ==
In 1887 he married Jean Lamont Barclay.

== Publications ==
- The Pharmacology of Curare (1889) winner of the Gunning-Christison Jubilee Prize for that year
- Curare and its Alkoids (1890)
- Curare as a Muscle Poison (1893)
- Patent and Quack Medicines (1893)
- Heredity and the Modern Novel (1894)
