= West Craigs =

Suburb of Edinburgh, Scotland

Coordinates: 55°56′47″N 3°19′02″W

West Craigs is a suburb on the western periphery of Edinburgh, Scotland. West Craigs is south-east of Edinburgh Airport and close to The Gyle Shopping Centre, Gogar, Turnhouse, Maybury and Edinburgh Gateway station.

The name has been used for a new housing development, just north-west of the West Craigs suburb

== Other uses ==
West Craigs is a new housing development between the towns of Hamilton and Blantyre in South Lanarkshire.
