= Turnhouse Golf Club =

Golf club in Edinburgh, Scotland

Coordinates: 55°57′0.00″N 3°19′58.80″W

Turnhouse Golf Club is a golf club situated in the West of Edinburgh on Lennie Hill at Turnhouse, Scotland.

== History ==
The course dates back to 1897 when there were only 9-holes. By 1900, the layout was expanded to 18 holes and James Braid made amendments to the original layout in 1924. This has been the home of Turnhouse Golf Club since the name changed from the Lothian Golf Club in 1909.

== Contemporary times ==
The club host an annual 7-day tournament which is regarded as one of the best in the Lothians and usually attracts high calibre players from far and wide. The layout has changed in recent years to include a brand new 5th hole in addition to the reshaping of many of the original greens.

== Junior golf ==
In 2005, Turnhouse became the first Edinburgh golf club to offer ClubGolf junior golf coaching. Their member, Iain Holt, has recently won a national award in recognition of his achievements.

In 2013, the Turnhouse Junior team won a triple of the Edinburgh Summer League, the Edinburgh Inter Club and also the Scottish final of the Junior Team Golf Home Nations event. The latter victory saw the team qualifying as Scottish Champions for the Home Nations Championship in Spain.
