= Longstone, Edinburgh =

Area of Edinburgh, Scotland

Coordinates: 55.923°N 3.260°W

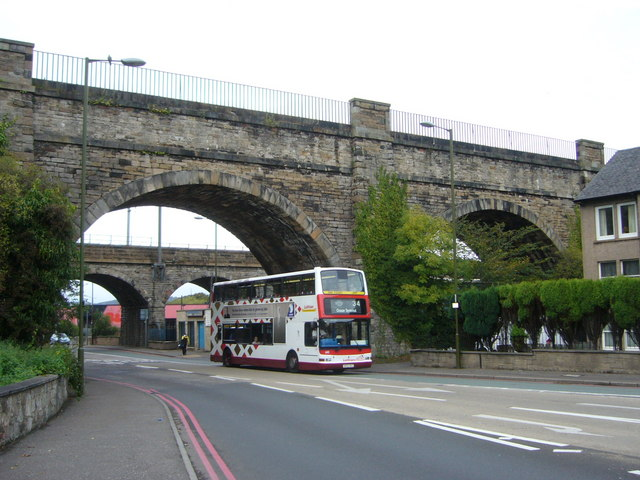
- Slateford Aqueduct and Viaduct at Longstone

- Location within the City of Edinburgh council area Location within Scotland
- Council area: City of Edinburgh
- Country: Scotland
- Sovereign state: United Kingdom
- Post town: EDINBURGH
- Postcode district: EH14
- Dialling code: 0131
- Police: Scotland
- Fire: Scottish
- Ambulance: Scottish

Longstone is a suburb of Edinburgh in Scotland. The area is primarily residential in nature, although the area includes several small shops, eateries and supermarkets, as well as one of the main bus depots for the city's buses. The population of Longstone (including Saughton) was 4,678 in 2019.

== History ==
For much of its early history, Longstone was used for agricultural purposes, with three farms being recorded in the 18th century. Inglis Green Road and manor house lie on the border between Longstone and Slateford. The name Inglis Green was given in 1773 when George Inglis of Redhall leased the land to a local businessman for use as a cloth Bleaching Green. The area was formerly the site of a pre-18th century farmstead known as Gray's Mill Farm (used very briefly as a temporary headquarters by Charles Edward Stuart in September 1745) and subsequently developed as a mill and then as a laundry until closing in 1983. In the Victorian period, Longstone was classed as a hamlet in the parish of Colinton.

Redhall park and the adjacent street names in Longstone take their name from the nearby Redhall (also known as Reidhall) castle on the border between Longstone and Craiglockhart beside the Water of Leith. The castle was owned by Adam Otterburn, a Scottish lawyer in the 16th century. It was later besieged and taken by the forces of Oliver Cromwell in 1650. In the 18th century, the castle was demolished and the stones used to build Redhall House in 1756 under the ownership of George Inglis of Auchendinny. The castle's octagonal doocot was kept and a walled garden also created. The house was subsequently inherited by his nephew, Vice-Admiral John Inglis. By the early 20th century, the House was purchased by the Edinburgh Corporation and converted to a children's home, now since defunct. Some of the adjacent estate has been converted to housing, with the doocot restored, although the main house remains abandoned. However, the walled garden is still in use, as a public garden under the ownership of the Scottish Association for Mental Health (SAMH) and lies within Longstone's boundary.

Longstone developed and expanded significantly after the Second World War and now, predominantly consists of post-war, mid 20th century housing in flats and semi-detached villas. In the 1940s, Longstone Road was known as Drumbrydon Road. The area occupied by the current Longstone Bus Garage was previously in use as a brickworks until the late 1940s. Today, housing is a mixture of terraces and flats, many consist of local authority housing, private housing and Ministry of Defence (armed services) housing, as well as former housing for prisoner officers of the nearby HM Prison Edinburgh.

== Geography ==
Longstone borders Craiglockhart to the east, Kingsknowe and Colinton to the south, Wester Hailes and Parkhead to the west, and Saughton, Stenhouse and Slateford to the north.

Longstone's most dramatic features are the Slateford Aqueduct (1822) carrying the Union Canal and the adjacent railway viaduct (1842). Underneath these runs the Water of Leith, and the canal may sometimes be seen pouring out through an overflow down into the river. The Water of Leith's visitor centre lies almost underneath the aqueduct here.

== Governance ==
Direct local governance in Longstone is carried under the direction of the Longstone Community Council, established in 1980 and funded by the City of Edinburgh Council. Longstone is represented in the City of Edinburgh Council by four councillors under the Sighthill/Gorgie Ward.

== Economy ==
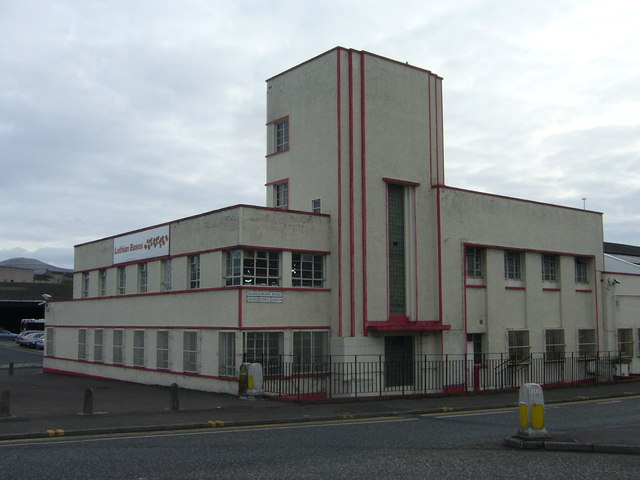
The office building of Longstone garage of Lothian Buses. This is the north east corner, as seen from the Longstone Road roundabout. The main shed is attached on the right. Since this shot was taken the garage has undergone a major extension, refurbishment and rebranding.

The area contains one of the city's main bus depots belonging to Lothian Buses, now named the Longstone Garage but formerly called the Lothian Regional Transport Office. The building was designed by T Bowhill Gibson and Laing in 1949 in the art deco style and was built in 1955. It has space for 220 buses.

There are also a small number of shops, a large Sainsbury's supermarket and a car dealership, in addition to several churches. Slateford Longstone Church (formerly known as Longstone Hall Church) was designed by the architect Leslie Grahame Thomson MacDougall in 1952 as a dual public hall and church, with a circular tower and copper roof. It was completed in 1954 and opened for worship in 1955 as a church under the Church of Scotland.

The Longstone Inn is a 19th-century public house on Longstone road. The inn and several adjacent properties have been abandoned since 2020 after becoming unsafe, following severe flooding of the adjacent Water of Leith.

== Community facilities ==
Hailes Quarry Park is a public park and recreation area between Longstone and Kingsknowe that is on the site of a former quarry that closed in 1902.

Redhall park is a public park bordering Longstone and Slateford that includes a football pitch, pavillon and play area. Redhall park contains the First and Second World War memorial for the Longstone and Slateford communities.

== Education ==
Longstone has two educational facilities. Longstone Primary School is a non denominational primary school based at Redhall Grove (before 1957 it was based in Longstone Road). Longstone Primary School is a Category C listed structure and was built between 1954 and 1957 to a design by Reid and Forbes in a horizontal art deco style. It is considered a notable example of a 1950s modernist school building.

In 2008 an additional school built next to Longstone Primary School called Redhall Primary School supports children with moderate learning difficulties.
