= Fernieside =

Suburb of Edinburgh, Scotland

Coordinates: 55°54′45″N 3°7′52″W

Fernieside is a neighbourhood on the southern edge of the city of Edinburgh, Scotland, four miles (6.5 km) southeast of the city centre. It is very close to Craigour, which is just to its north, with Ferniehill to the south, Moredun to the west and open land to the east denoting the city boundary (Danderhall a short distance further on); most amenities are found at Gilmerton. Laid out as public housing from 1947, many properties have been sold through right-to-buy legislation, while small private developments have been inserted to the north in the early 21st century.

== Fernieside Primary School ==
Fernieside Primary School was the local primary school until it was replaced in 2004 by Craigour Park Primary School which also replaced Moredun Primary School. Homes were built over the old school and this has now become Fernieside Place. Notable alumni from Fernieside Primary School include Olympic sprinting champion Allan Wells.

== St John Vianney Catholic Church ==
St John Vianney Roman Catholic Church in Fernieside Gardens is a notable centrepiece of the neighbourhood. The unassuming red brick building built in 1952 by Reginald Fairlie (1883 - 1952) lies on Fernieside Gardens and celebrated its Golden Jubilee during November 2002.

== Fernieside Football Club ==
Fernieside Football / Boys Club Logo

Fernieside Football Club was formed in 1989 by Billy Forbes and Andrew Whitfield.

Their first game was a friendly against the now defunct Moredun Boys Club (a 5-3 loss)

Some of the players that played in that game for Fernieside were, Graeme Lennie, Ross Braidwood, Steven Forbes (Captain), Martin Johnson, Chris Higgins, Harry Whitfield, Paul Forbes, James Spratt, Martin Taylor and Stuart McKenzie.

Their first strip was green and red, although they wore strips borrowed from Fernieside Primary School (black and white stripes) for the aforementioned friendly with Moredun, as they didn't have their own strips yet.

With help from local businesses, including Ferguson's The Bakers, Fillsell's and Fazell's, helping to raise and donate funds, the club became a reality.

Fernieside then switched to the yellow and blue they were always known for.

Their clubrooms are at Drum Park, Gilmerton, although they originally played at Fernieside Park, with their club rooms in the (now demolished) Moredun Community Centre, at times they also used Fernieside Primary School, depending on what pitch of the three in Fernieside Park, they played on.

== Demographics ==
Ethnicity	Liberton/Gilmerton Ward	Edinburgh
White	82.6%	84.9%
Asian	10.2%	8.6%
Black	2.7%	2.1%
Mixed	2.4%	2.5%
Other	2.1%	1.9%

== Sources ==
- "South Edinburgh Cluster - St John Vianney, St Catherine's and St Gregory Catholic Church". southedinburghrc.org.uk. Archived from the original on 29 July 2013.
- http://www.scotland.gov.uk/Resource/Doc/91982/0061201.doc
- "Fernieside from the Gazetteer for Scotland".
- "Dictionary of Scottish Architects - DSA Architect Biography Report". Archived from the original on 18 March 2012.
