= Gracemount =

Area of Edinburgh, Scotland

Coordinates: 55.90516°N 3.15739°W

Gracemount: Scots: Gracemoont/Gracey
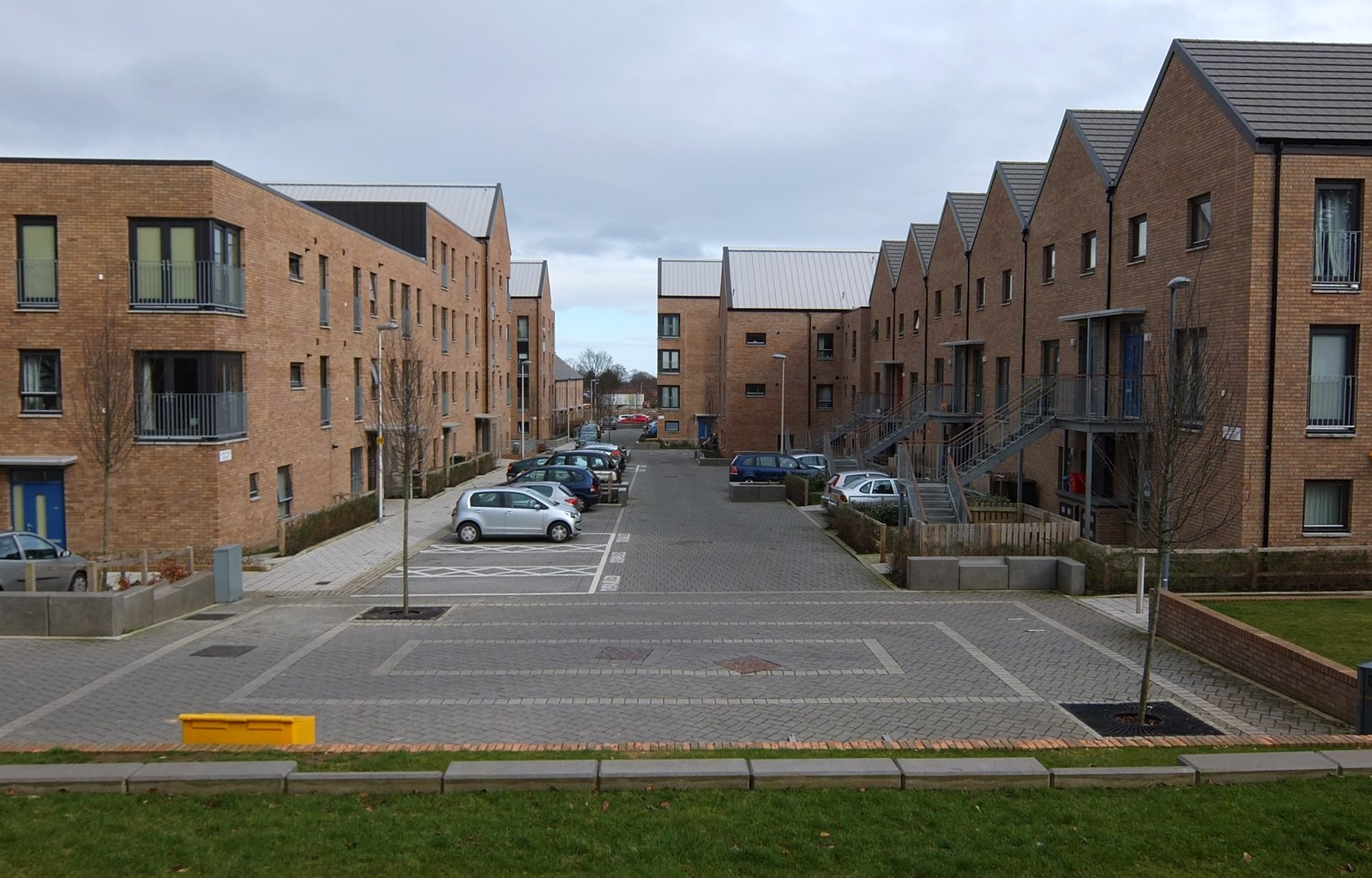
- Modern (2010) apartments built on the site of Gracemount's 1960s tower blocks

- Location within the City of Edinburgh council area Location within Scotland
- Council area: City of Edinburgh
- Country: Scotland
- Sovereign state: United Kingdom
- Post town: EDINBURGH
- Postcode district: EH16
- Dialling code: 0131
- Police: Scotland
- Fire: Scottish
- Ambulance: Scottish
- UK Parliament: Edinburgh South
- Scottish Parliament: Edinburgh Eastern

Gracemount is a neighbourhood in the south of Edinburgh, Scotland, bordering Alnwickhill and Kaimes to the west, Liberton to the north, Gilmerton to the east and Southhouse to the south.

== Description ==
Although fairly small in territory and population (approximately 2 square miles in area, with three Scottish Government 'data zones' totalling just over 3,000 residents in 2021), many of the wider area's local amenities are based here, owing to it being roughly at a midway point in the land around and between the old villages of Gilmerton and Liberton which was developed with a number of housing schemes between the 1950s and 1970s in response to Edinburgh's need to replace substandard inner-city housing. Since then, several more private developments of varying sizes and scope have been added, creating a suburban cluster almost separate from the city's main urban area (partly due to the natural boundary of the Braid Hills); since 2007 this has formed the Liberton/Gilmerton ward under the City of Edinburgh Council serving a population of around 37,000 in 2021, a figure that continues to creep upwards due to more housebuilding. Gracemount falls under Liberton's Community Council.

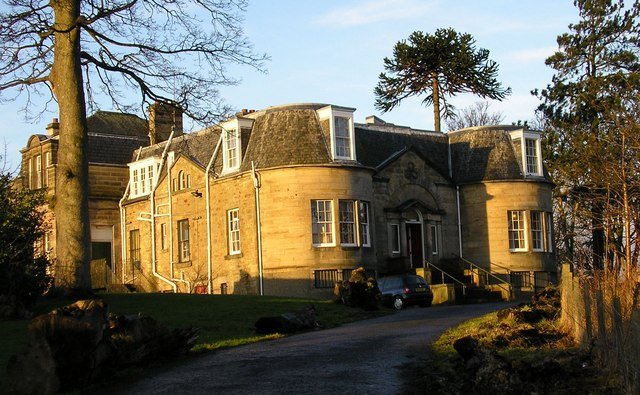
Gracemount House in 2009

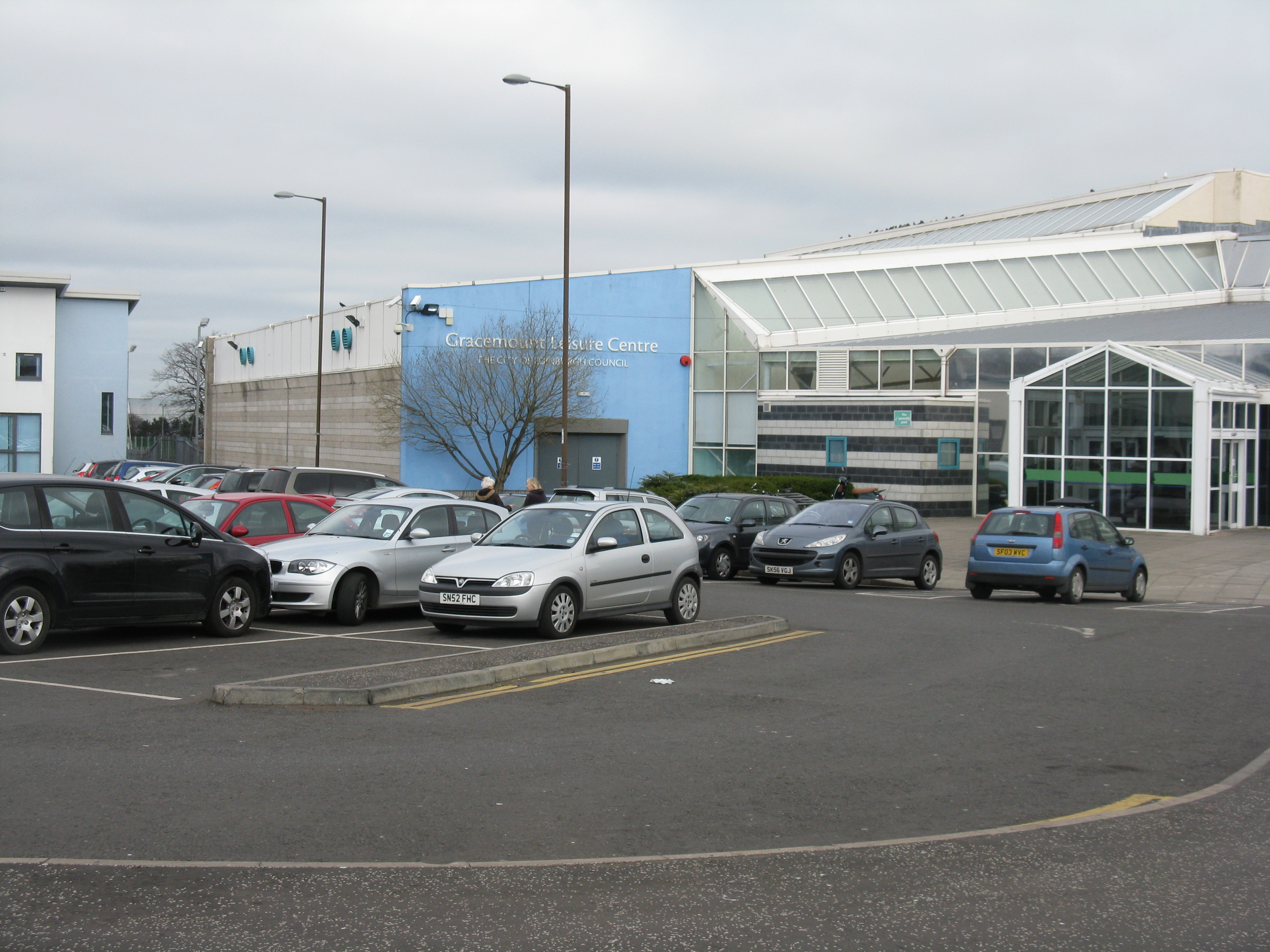
Gracemount Leisure Centre in 2012

The neighbourhood is based around the grounds of the late-18th century Gracemount House, a Category B listed mansion which has become derelict in 2018, having previously been utilised as the local community centre. A few other country manors have survived in the area, including St Catherine's (now a pub-restaurant) with its 17th-century Balm Well, and Southfield House which served as a sanatorium throughout the 20th century; the 1870s Northfield House, latterly a hotel, was already unoccupied and earmarked for demolition as part of a redevelopment but this was hastened in 2023 after arson attacks. Other historic buildings include the 1890s Mount Alvernia Poor Clare Convent adjacent to the older buildings of Liberton Hospital (which is today used for geriatric medicine along with nearby Ellen's Glen House) and the 1880s Original Industrial School (Guthrie Court).

Certain 'data zones' in and around Gracemount are considered to be economically deprived, with several within the 'top' 20% under the Scottish Index of Multiple Deprivation studies in 2012, 2016 and 2020. Original housing is mainly modest terraced houses and three-storey tenements, most still with typical grey pebbledash exteriors dating from the time of their construction. There were also three 14-storey tower blocks (built 1962, demolished 2009) situated just north of the mansion house, with modern houses and apartments filling that gap site and others in the vicinity.

Within Gracemount itself, facilities include a refurbished shopping precinct, Catholic church, leisure centre with swimming pool and 5-a-side football pitches (opened 1989) NHS medical practice, council services office (covering much of southern and central Edinburgh) and four schools: Kaimes Special School, St Catherine's RC Primary (a feeder for Holy Rood High), Gracemount Primary, and Gracemount High School; the eponymous schools are unusual in that the primary has a very large roll (575 in 2019) while the secondary roll is only slightly higher (623 in 2023), with another provision – Liberton High School – less than a mile away. A local handball team, Gracemount Edinburgh Handball Club, trains at the high school having started out at the leisure centre. The district's police station is located to the west of the area at Howdenhall, where a children's residential home was also situated until closed in 2023 following multiple reports of abuse by staff.

The only public transport in the area is the bus, with several Lothian Buses routes running along Captain's Road (B701) to the south of the neighbourhood and on Liberton Road (A701). The latter is one of the main road arteries between the city centre and the Edinburgh City Bypass (A720), the junction for which at Straiton (on the boundary with Midlothian) is less than a mile from Gracemount to the south.

== Demographics ==
Ethnicity	Liberton/Gilmerton Ward	Edinburgh
White	82.6%	84.9%
Asian	10.2%	8.6%
Black	2.7%	2.1%
Mixed	2.4%	2.5%
Other	2.1%	1.9%
