= Clovenstone =

Suburb of Edinburgh, Scotland

Coordinates: 55.912°N 3.274°W

Clovenstone is a neighbourhood in southwestern Edinburgh, Scotland. It is in Wester Hailes and close to the A720 road. Wester Hailes Baptist Church is in Clovenstone, as is a local nursing home, also has a primary school, 2 parks, and flats and houses.
