= Bughtlin =

Suburb of Edinburgh, Scotland

Coordinates: 55°57′15″N 3°18′25″W

Bughtlin is a suburb of Edinburgh, the capital of Scotland. It is east of the A902.

The area is near Maybury, Cammo, East Craigs and Barnton. Most of the buildings are of modern construction.
