= Redford, Edinburgh =

Suburb of Edinburgh, Scotland

Coordinates: 55°54′26″N 3°14′28″W

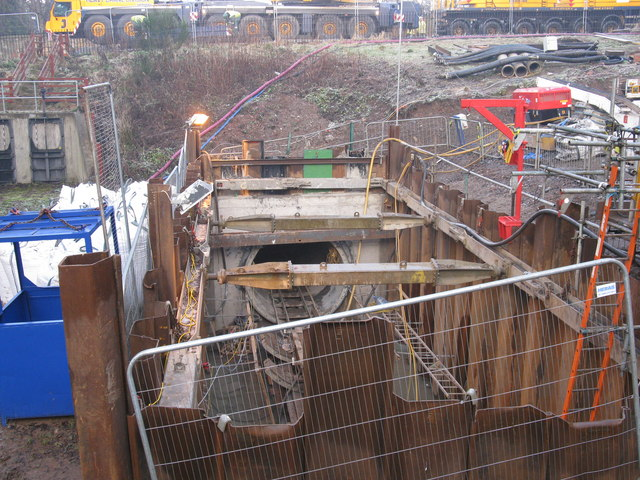

Redford is a suburb of Edinburgh, the capital of Scotland. It is in the south-west of the city, south-east of the Colinton area, and is known particularly for Redford Barracks, an army base.
