= Gogar =

Coordinates: 55.935°N 3.334°W

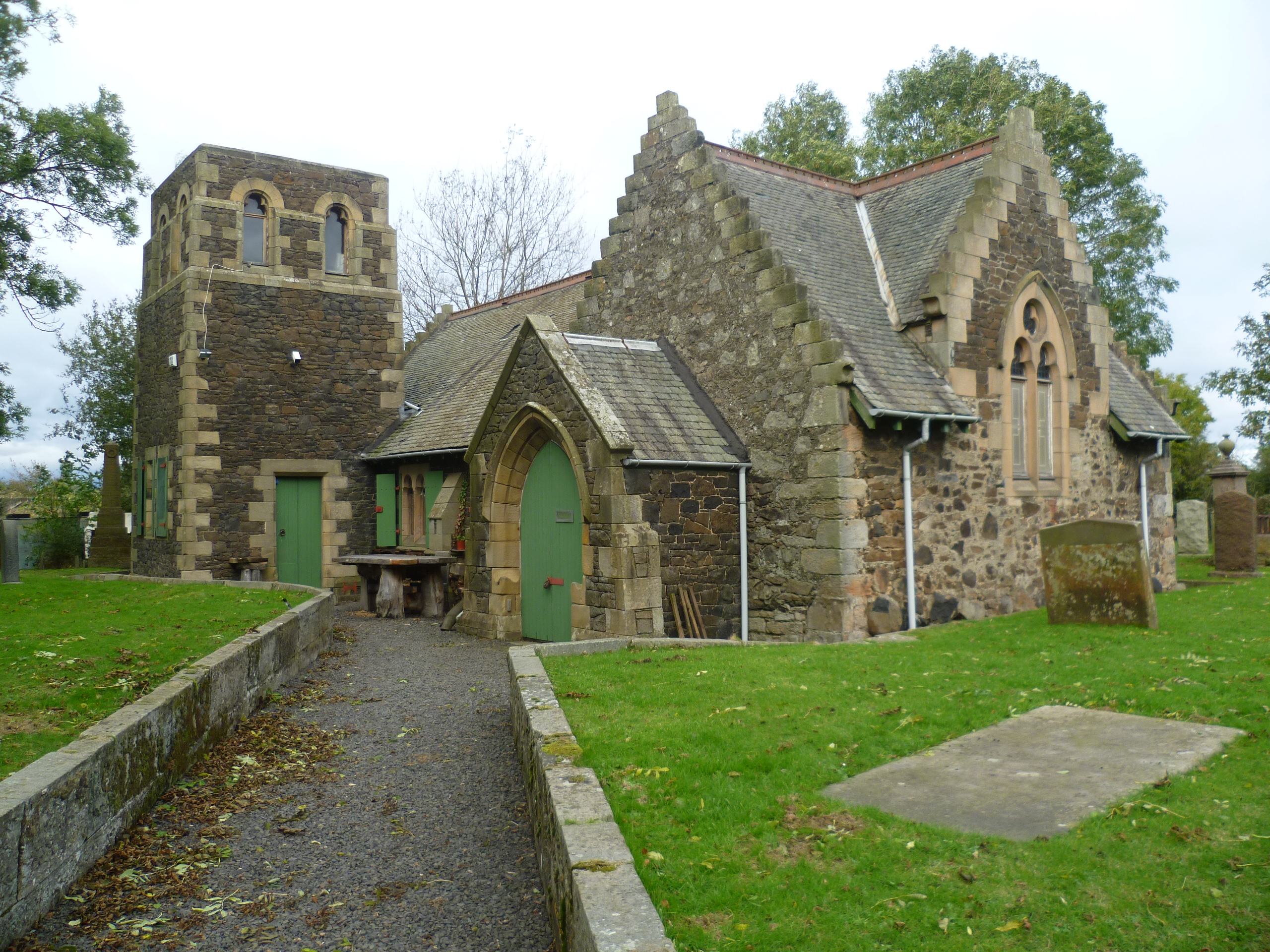
- Gogar Kirk

- Location within the City of Edinburgh council area Location within Scotland
- OS grid reference: NT1672
- Council area: City of Edinburgh
- Lieutenancy area: Edinburgh
- Country: Scotland
- Sovereign state: United Kingdom
- Post town: EDINBURGH
- Postcode district: EH12
- Dialling code: 0131
- Police: Scotland
- Fire: Scottish
- Ambulance: Scottish
- UK Parliament: Edinburgh West
- Scottish Parliament: Edinburgh Western

Gogar is a predominantly rural area of Edinburgh, Scotland, located to the west of the city. It is not far from Gogarloch, Edinburgh Park and Maybury. The Fife Circle Line is to the north.

== Etymology ==
The name of Gogar first appears in a clearly datable context in 1233. The etymology is uncertain. It may be derived from "cog" or "gowk", a Scots term for cuckoo, a bird with known ritual significance in ancient times, or from the Brythonic term for red, "coch" (cf "Red Heughs" in the vicinity).

The name also appears as a compound in several places in the area, notably Gogarloch named after the drained Gogar Loch; Gogarburn, Gogarbank, Gogarstone and Castle Gogar.

== Prehistory and archaeology ==
In 2008, in advance of the construction of the Edinburgh tram line archaeological work was undertaken by GUARD Archaeology to the west of Gogar Mains. The archaeologists discovered a range of features and structures that date from the Neolithic to the Early Middle Ages. The Neolithic finds were pits radiocarbon dated from 3880 to 2487 BC. They found pottery that was a Beaker vessel, dated to 2146–2015 BC, the early Bronze Age. There was also a Bronze Age ring ditch with some sort of structure inside and a palisade trench too. Two Iron Age huts and two possible corn-drying kilns from the early medieval period were also found, plus pillboxes from World War II were recorded hear the area. All these findings indicate that people were living and working in the area, on and off, for thousands of years.

GUARD also excavated some of the remains of the medieval village of Nether Gogar as part of that same tram line project. They found a well, corn drying kilns and numerous ditches. There was a break in occupation in that area of Gogar during the mid-14th century, which the archaeologists believe could have been the result of the Black Death reducing the population during that time.

== History ==
The first reference to the lands of Gogar is in a charter issued by King William I of Scotland, dated to between 1165 and 1174. The charter gifted an estate consisting of the land at Gogar, Cousland and Pentland to Ralph de Graham, a knight whose family had moved from England to Scotland during the reign of David I (1124–53). After that the lands were subdivided and changed hands several times. A notable owner was the Knights of the Hospital of St John.

The parish of Gogar is first mentioned in 1247, when the church was re-consecrated by Bishop David de Bernham of St Andrews. The re-consecration means that the parish was already established at that time. In 1529 the income from the parish was reallocated to Trinity College Kirk in Edinburgh.

In 1599 the parish was amalgamated with Corstorphine and after this the church was no longer used for services.

By the early 17th century much of the land had been acquired by the Logans of Restalrig who built Castle Gogar.

On 27 August 1650, a skirmish took place around Gogar between the forces of Oliver Cromwell and General Leslie, who was camped in the area around Gogar Kirk. While the marshy ground prevented the opposing sides meeting at close quarters, both sides fired cannon upon the other, inflicting some casualties.

Cromwell described the incident, which lasted from 3pm-6pm, thus:

We marched westward of Edinburgh towards Stirling, which the Enemy perceiving, marched with as great expedition as was possible to prevent us; and the vanguards of both the Armies came to skirmish, - upon a place where bogs and passes made the access of each Army to the other difficult. We, being ignorant of the place, drew up, hoping to have engaged: but found no way feasible, by reason of the bogs and other difficulties. We drew up our cannon, and did that day discharge two or three hundred great shot upon them; a considerable number they likewise returned to us; and this was all that passed from each to the other. Wherein we had near twenty killed and wounded, but not one Commission Officer. The Enemy, as we are informed, had about eighty killed, and some considerable Officers. Seeing they would keep their ground, from which we could not remove them, and our bread being spent, - we were necessitated to go for a new supply: and so marched off about ten or eleven o’clock on Wednesday morning.

Sir Robert Liston bought the old village of Gogar in 1830/31 and he made improvements to the village and farms; he is buried in the churchyard.

In 2003, medieval remains were discovered near the site of the new headquarters of the Royal Bank of Scotland. Pottery shards, rubbish pits, and animal bones were unearthed north of the A8, opposite the bank's headquarters. The items suggest the site was used for agriculture in medieval times.

In 2005, the new headquarters of the Scottish Agricultural Science Agency was opened at Gogarbank Farm in farmland bordering the M8.

== Notable Graves ==
- James Pittendrigh Macgillivray (1856–1938) is buried here with his wife Frieda.
- Thomas Grainger engineer (1794–1852)

== Notable buildings ==
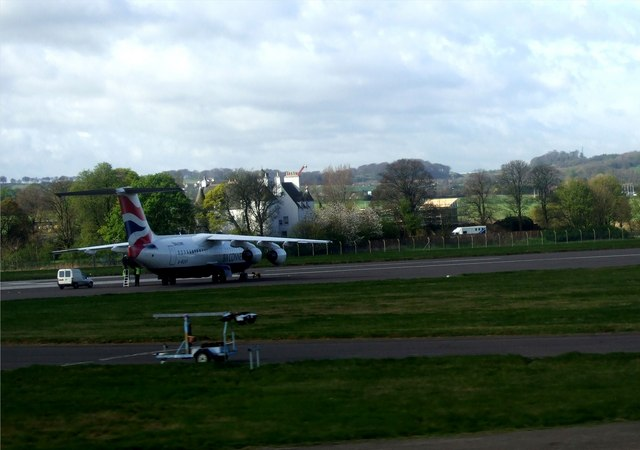
Castle Gogar seen across the airport runway

There are a number of large 18th-century and 19th-century villas in the area – including Gogarbank, Over Gogar, and Gogar Park House.

The most notable historical building is probably Castle Gogar, an A-Listed Scottish Baronial L-plan mansion. It was built in 1625 by the master architect William Ayton for John Cowper, whose father had bought the estate in 1601, and his wife, Helen Skene of Hallyards Castle. The castle replaced an earlier building of 14th-century origin, traces of which can be found in the castle's foundations. The original Castle Gogar (Gogar House), built about 1300, belonged to the Forresters of Corstorphine; in the 16th century, the owner was Robert Logan of Restalrig who sold the house and lands to Adam Couper in 1601. The property was extended in the mid-1700s and again in the 19th century when the Scots Baronial features such as the tower and turrets were added. Castle Gogar was owned for over 200 years by members of the Gibson-Maitland and the Steel-Maitland families, until the death of Brenda Steel-Maitland in 2002. It has since been restored, the restoration funded by development of new homes in the castle grounds The castle itself, including 3.656 acres of grounds, has since been put up for sale by its owners for £2.9 million

Another important historic building is Millburn Tower, a mansion with extensive wooded grounds. It has a castellated keep (built 1806), with a long range of lower building attached.

== West Town Development ==
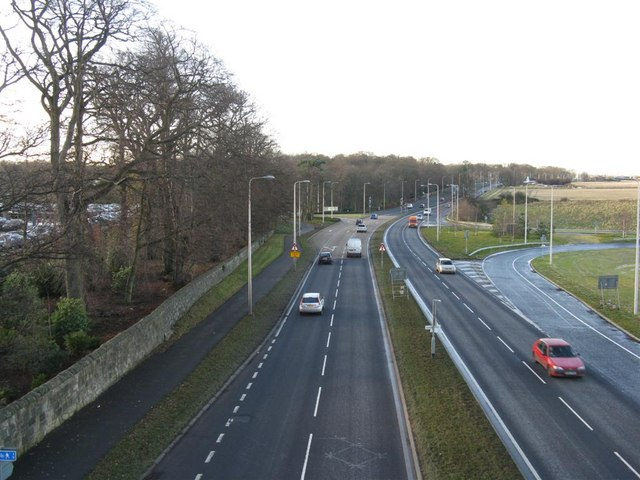
View of the A8 road at Gogar looking west; the land on the north (right) side of the road would form part of the West Town development

West Town Edinburgh is a planned housing development to the west of Edinburgh and adjacent to Edinburgh Airport near Gogar and Ingliston. The construction of 7,000 homes is proposed. The site has an area of around 205 acres. It is adjacent to Edinburgh Airport and Ingliston Park and Ride. The Edinburgh Tram passes through the middle of the site. The development was formerly referred to as Edinburgh 205. The proposal was developed by New Ingliston Limited, whose chairperson is Bill Gammell. In April 2021, "Drum Property" purchased a controlling interest in the company. The plans were officially announced by Bill Gammel on 2 December 2021. The plans were approved "in principle" during December 2024.

== Transport ==
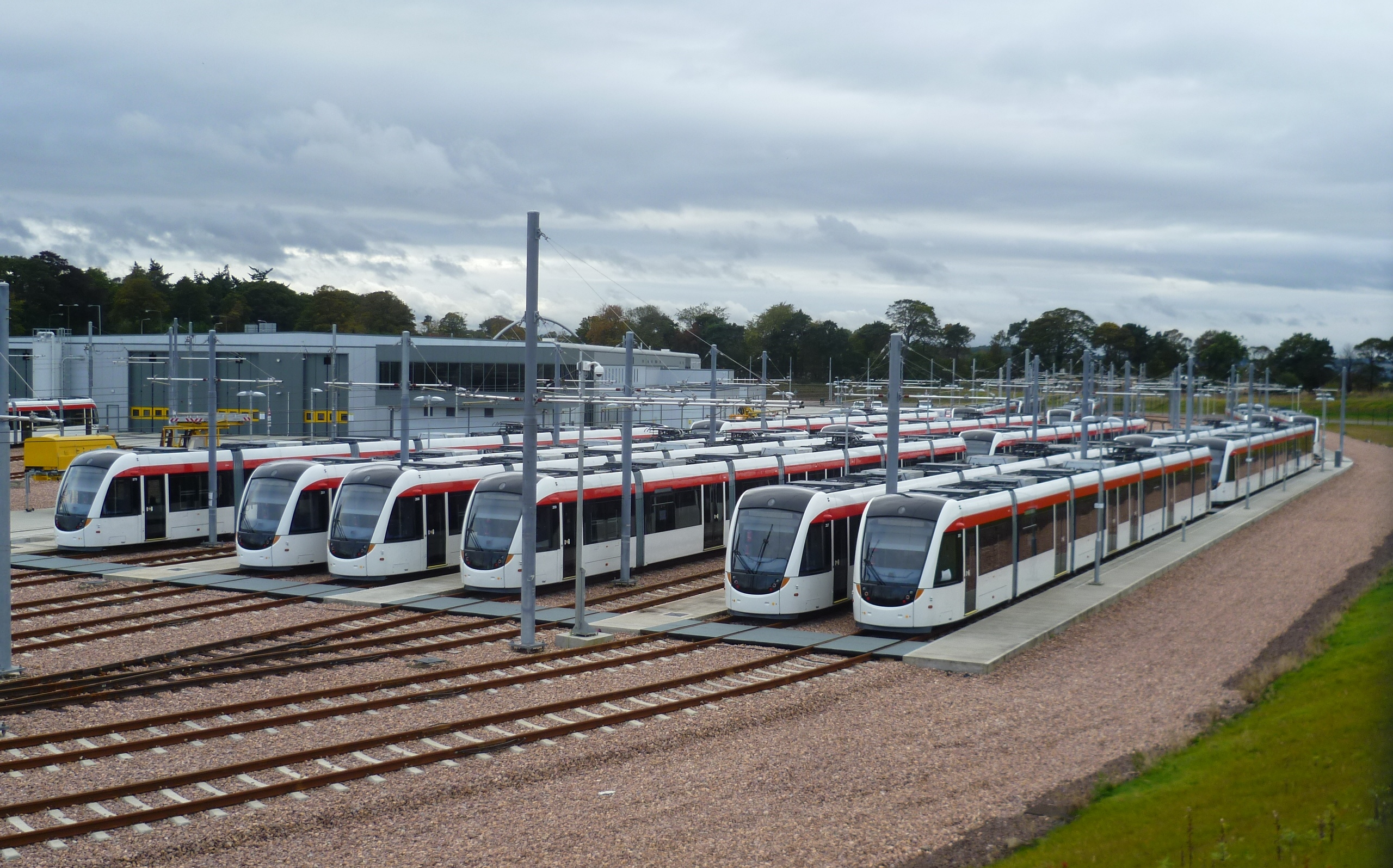
Tram depot in 2012

The depot for the new Edinburgh Trams is located at Gogar. In December 2008, Transport Minister Stewart Stevenson MSP announced that there would also be a new £43m Edinburgh Gateway station on the Fife Circle line and Edinburgh Trams to provide connections to Edinburgh Airport. It opened on 11 December 2016, having cost £41m.

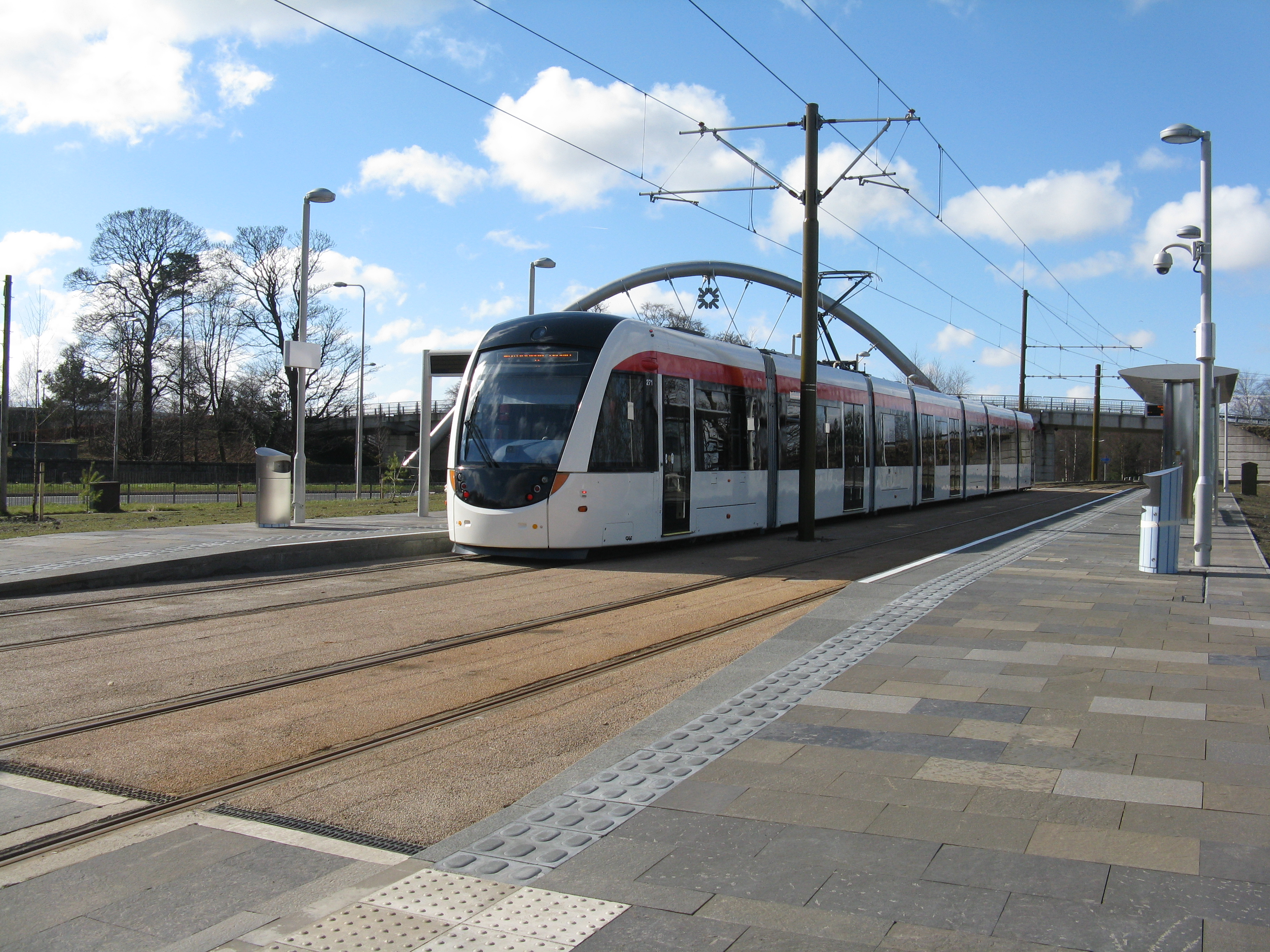
Tram stopping at Gogarburn

Gogarburn tram stop serves the headquarters of The Royal Bank of Scotland.

Preceding station	Edinburgh Trams	Following station
Edinburgh Gateway towards Newhaven	Newhaven - Edinburgh Airport	Ingliston Park & Ride towards Edinburgh Airport

== See also ==
- Gogarloch
