= Kaimes =

Area of Edinburgh, Scotland

Coordinates: 55°54′03″N 3°10′00″W

- Location within Edinburgh
- OS grid reference: NT269680
- Council area: Edinburgh
- Lieutenancy area: Edinburgh
- Country: Scotland
- Sovereign state: United Kingdom
- Post town: EDINBURGH
- Postcode district: EH16, EH17
- Dialling code: 0131
- Police: Scotland
- Fire: Scottish
- Ambulance: Scottish
- UK Parliament: Edinburgh South
- Scottish Parliament: Edinburgh Eastern

Kaimes is an outer suburb of Edinburgh, the capital of Scotland. Centred on the Kaimes junction (A701 and B701) which nowadays links to Straiton Junction of the Edinburgh City Bypass, it is south of Alnwickhill, east of Mortonhall, north of Heritage Grange and Burdiehouse and west of Gracemount and Southhouse.
