= Broomhouse, Edinburgh =

Area of Edinburgh, Scotland

Coordinates: 55°55′42.00″N 3°16′51.05″W

Broomhouse
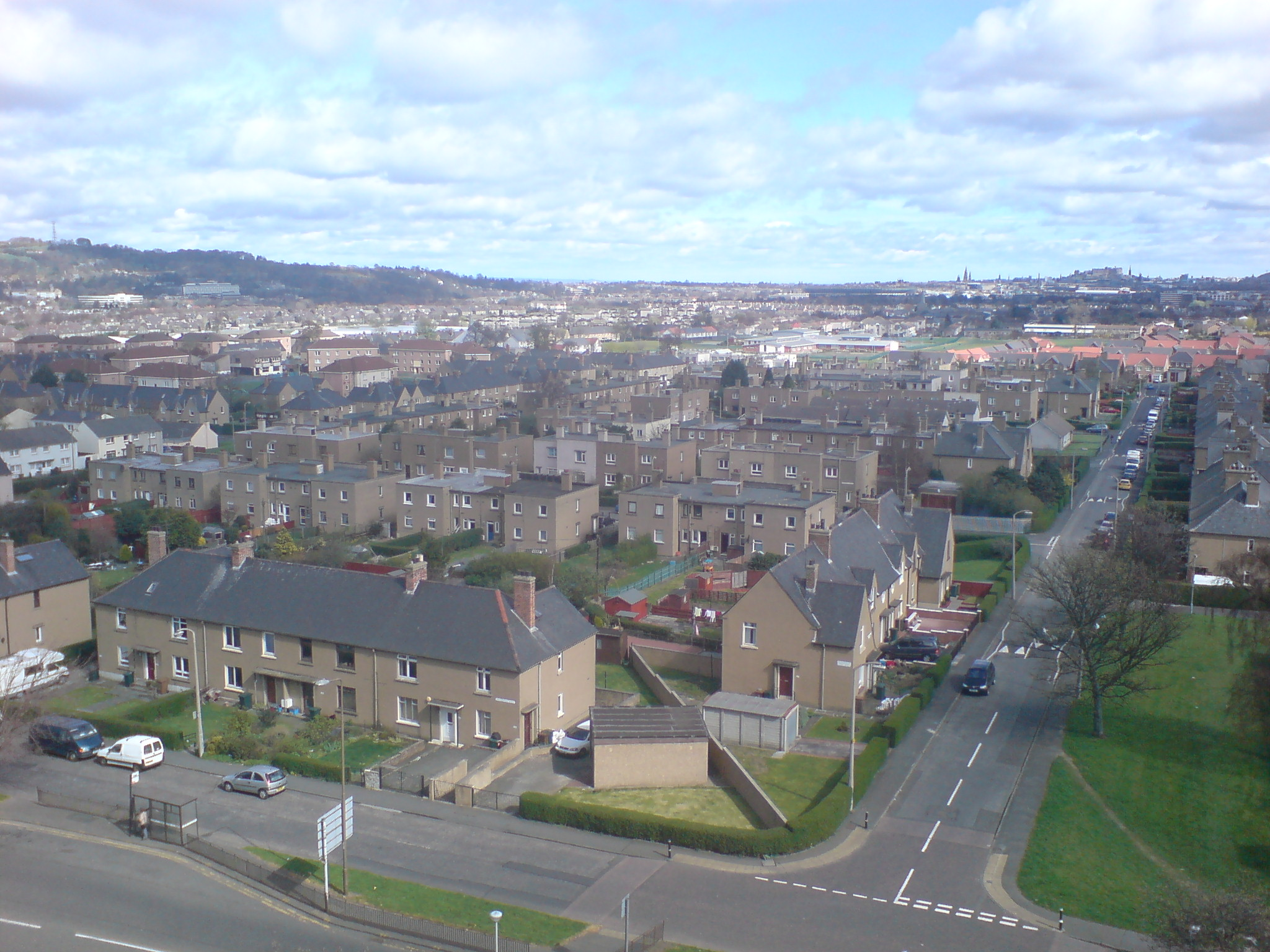

- Location within the City of Edinburgh council area Location within Scotland
- OS grid reference: NT203716
- Council area: City of Edinburgh
- Lieutenancy area: Edinburgh
- Country: Scotland
- Sovereign state: United Kingdom
- Post town: EDINBURGH
- Postcode district: EH11
- Dialling code: 0131
- UK Parliament: Edinburgh South West
- Scottish Parliament: Edinburgh Pentlands

Broomhouse is a district of Edinburgh, Scotland. Although on the lands of Old Saughton, its name is adopted from an estate which lay to the north of the Edinburgh and Glasgow Railway. The earliest recorded versions of the name (c.1600) were variations on Brum(e)hous. It mainly comprises a low-rise council housing estate built between 1947 and 1950. It borders on Parkhead, Sighthill, and Saughton Mains. The arterial route of Calder Road (A71) passes to the south.

== Transport ==
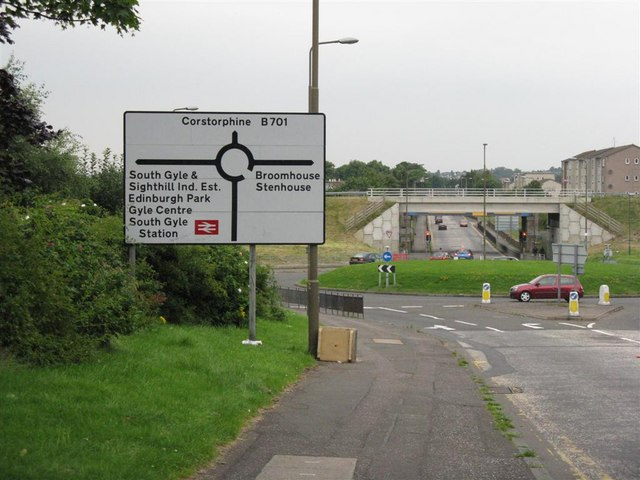
Bridge built in the area for the former West Edinburgh Busway

Parallel to Broomhouse Drive was Scotland's first guided busway, West Edinburgh Busway, opened in 2004. The around one-mile section of two-lane busway was, at the time, the longest section of continuous bus guideway in the UK. Subsequently, it has been converted as part of the Edinburgh Trams route with Saughton tram stop at the eastern end of Broomhouse Drive.

The Glasgow railway passes to the north, but there is no railway station.

There are regular bus services passing nearby operated by Lothian Buses and Lothian Country. Services 1, 2, 3, 12, 21, 22, 22A, 25, X27, X28, 30, 33, 34, 35 & 36 (as of October 2024). There is also the Tram which operates nearby at Saughton Tram stop.

== Amenities ==
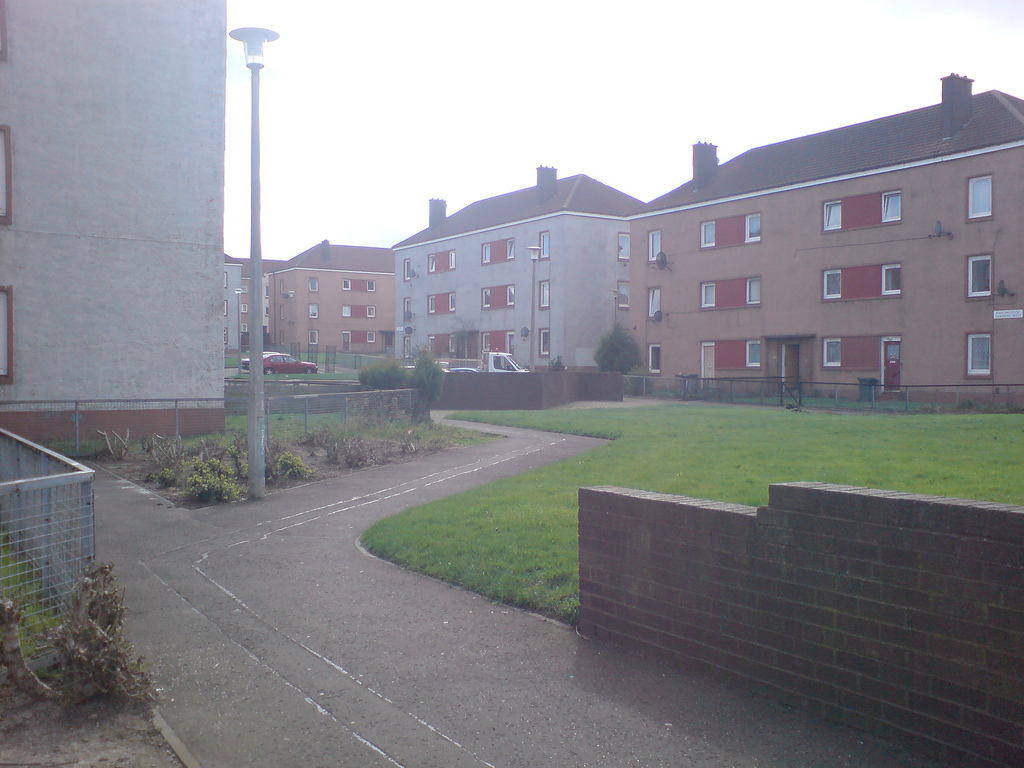

There were two schools (one Roman Catholic the other non-denominational), now merged. a community centre, two Church congregations (St. Joseph's R.C and St David's Broomhouse C.o.S.) and a counselling centre here. Medical facilities are in nearby Sighthill and Corstorphine.

Saughton House is a large Government building, built in the 1950s, fronting on Broomhouse Drive and houses the Scottish Government, HM Revenue & Customs, Driver & Vehicle Licensing Agency and a number of other government offices.

The Broomhouse Centre (now Space at The Broomhouse Hub), has served the community since 1990 and a new Community Hub building was opened in 2019 at a cost of £3.2m. The Hub provides a range of activities and support for the local community as well as a Community Café.

== Notable residents ==
- Les McKeown of the Bay City Rollers, was born and brought up in the area.
