= Bingham, Edinburgh =

Area of Edinburgh, Scotland

Bingham
- Suburb
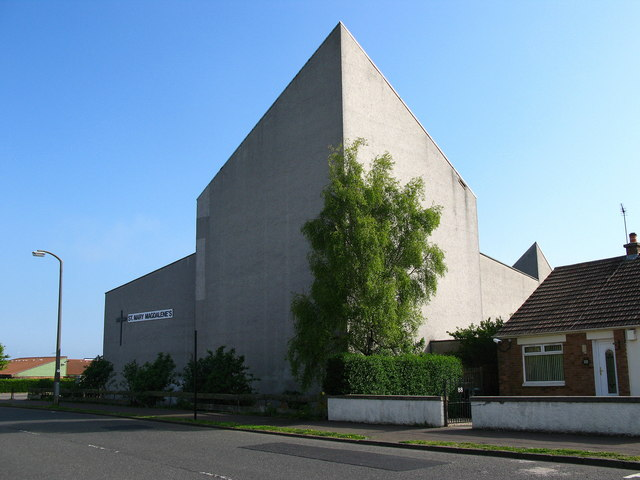
- St Mary Magdalene's Roman Catholic Church
- Interactive map of Bingham
- Coordinates: 55°56′15.73″N 3°7′28.51″W
- Country: Scotland
- City: Edinburgh
- Council area: City of Edinburgh

Bingham is a suburb of Edinburgh, the capital of Scotland. It is east of Duddingston, west of Magdalene, south of Portobello and north of Niddrie. The main A1 road skirts Bingham to the north.

== Sources ==
(Google Maps)
