= Gogarloch =

Residential area in Edinburgh, Scotland

Coordinates: 55°56′9.22″N 3°18′18.57″W

Gogarloch is a residential area within South Gyle, Edinburgh, Scotland. It lies near South Gyle railway station and South Gyle Broadway, 4 1/2 miles (7.2 km) west of the city centre. Corstorphine and Wester Broom are nearby.

Historically this area was marshland (hence 'loch' in the name) but the land was drained in the 19th century to create space for a new railway. Most of the housing is of the 1990s era.

Other lost lochs of Edinburgh include the Nor Loch and Burgh Loch on the site of the present day Meadows area.

== See also ==
- Gogar
