= Mountcastle, Edinburgh =

Suburb of Edinburgh, Scotland

Coordinates: 55°57′6.61″N 3°7′57.76″W

Mountcastle is a suburb of Edinburgh, the capital of Scotland. It is east of the city centre and lies to the north-west of the neighbouring area of Portobello. Mountcastle is primarily a residential area, with many early-mid 20th century houses.

== Sources ==
(Google Maps)
