= Saughton =

Suburb of Edinburgh, Scotland

Coordinates: 55°55′46″N 3°16′05″W

Saughton: Scottish Gaelic: Baile nan Seileach
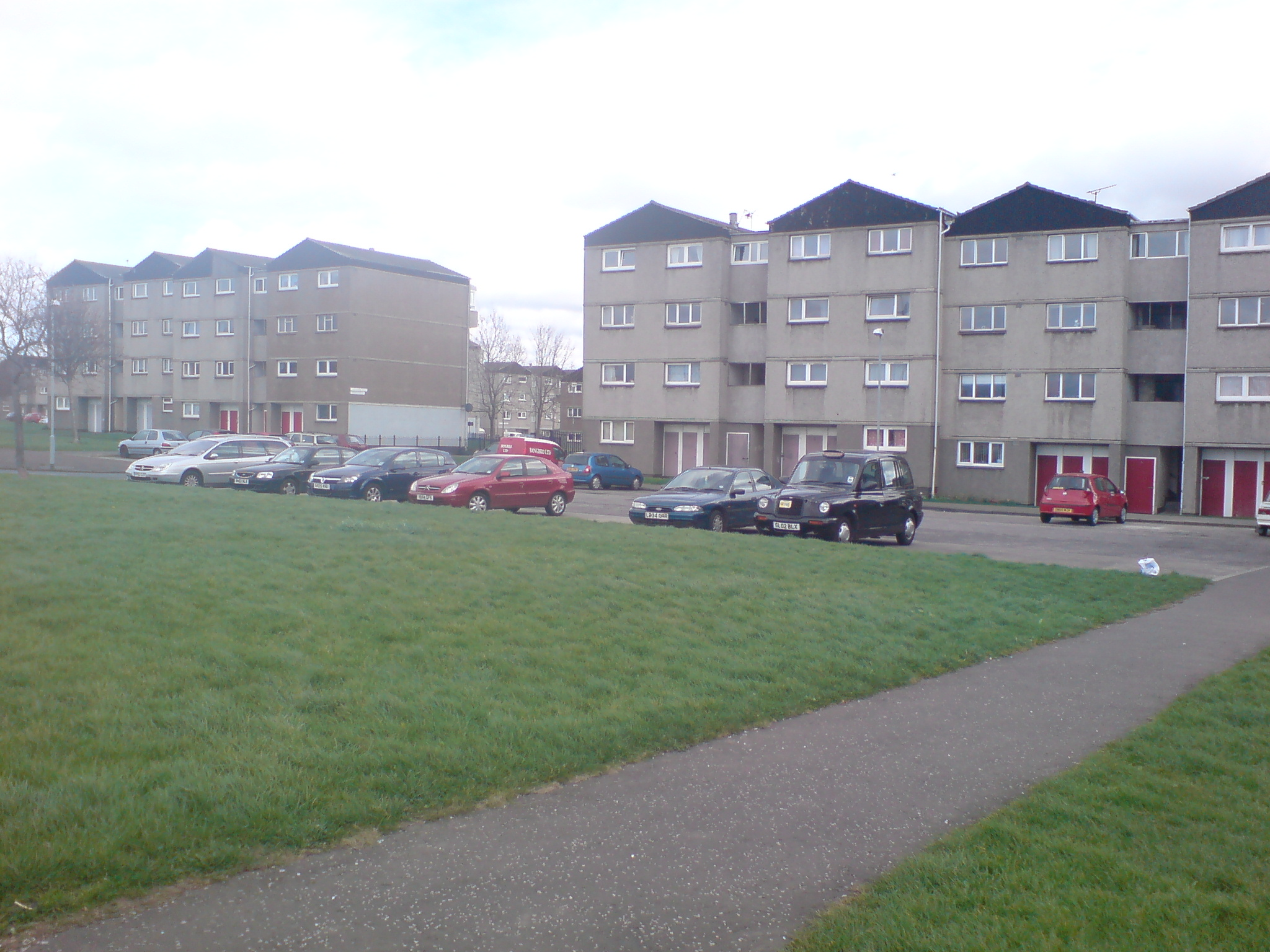
- 1960s council flats in Saughton Mains

- Location within the City of Edinburgh council area Location within Scotland
- OS grid reference: NT210718
- Council area: City of Edinburgh
- Country: Scotland
- Sovereign state: United Kingdom
- Post town: EDINBURGH
- Postcode district: EH11
- Dialling code: 0131
- Police: Scotland
- Fire: Scottish
- Ambulance: Scottish
- UK Parliament: Edinburgh West Edinburgh South West
- Scottish Parliament: Edinburgh Pentlands

Saughton (/ˈsɔːxtən/, Scottish Gaelic: Baile nan Seileach, lit. 'town of the willows') is a suburb of the west of Edinburgh, Scotland, bordering Broomhouse, Stenhouse, Longstone and Carrick Knowe. In Lowland Scots, a "sauch" is a willow. The Water of Leith flows by here.

It is the location of HM Prison Edinburgh, known colloquially as "Saughton Prison", in the south of the district.

The A71 road, one of the main city arteries, runs through the area – it is known here as Calder Road, becoming Stenhouse Road and Gorgie Road further east.

Saughton Park, a large public park, has facilities including Scotland's largest skatepark; it is located on the opposite side of Stenhouse from the core of the Saughton neighbourhood.

Actually situated in the Broomhouse area and fronting onto Broomhouse Drive, Saughton House is a large Government office, built in the 1950s, which houses the Scottish Government, Scottish Courts Service, and a number of other Government offices.

== Transport ==
=== Tram ===
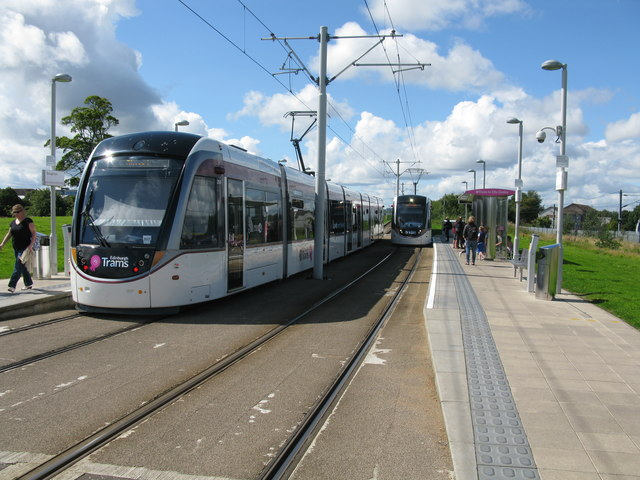
Saughton tram stop

Saughton tram stop is located close to the junction of Broomhouse Drive and Saughton Road North, adjacent to the main railway lines though the area (the Glasgow–Edinburgh via Falkirk line is joined by the Fife Circle Line here).

Preceding station	Edinburgh Trams	Following station
Balgreen towards Newhaven	Newhaven - Edinburgh Airport	Bankhead towards Airport

=== Buses ===
- Lothian Buses
  - 3, 25, 34, 35 (Calder Road)
  - 1, 2, 22 (Broomhouse Drive/ Stenhouse Drive)
- McGill's Scotland East
  - X22 (Calder Road)

== Notable residents ==
- William Stevenson (1772–1829), Scottish nonconformist preacher and writer.
- Graeme Souness (1953), retired Scottish footballer and manager
- Baird baronets of Saughton Hall

== Saughton cemetery ==
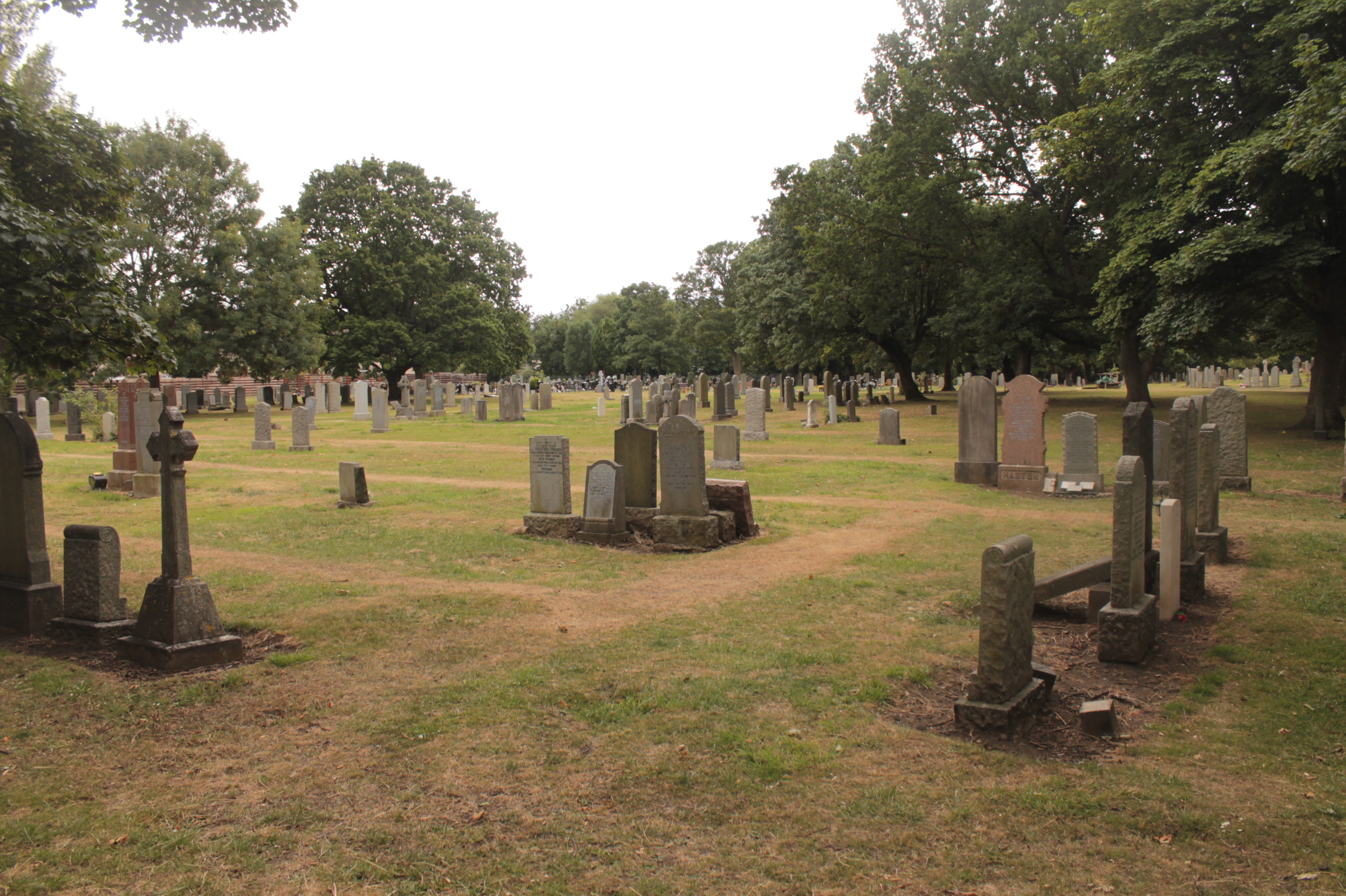
Saughton Cemetery, Edinburgh

Notable interments:

- Louis Deuchars, sculptor
