= Wester Broom =

District of Edinburgh, Scotland

Coordinates: 55°56′15″N 3°17′37″W

Wester Broom is a district of Edinburgh, Scotland. It borders Broomhouse/Forrester, Corstorphine and South Gyle. It is sometimes considered to be part of one of the latter two. It is mainly residential, with a few small shops and a large Tesco nearby. The Fife railway line is arguably the boundary, although some will extend it south to the Glasgow line, and to include Forresters and two schools.

== History ==
The bulk of Wester Broom was constructed in the late twentieth century.

The footings of a castle/tower house were found here during the construction of the estate, but little else is known about it.

== Notable residents ==
- Martainn Mac an t-Saoir - Gaelic novelist and poet.
- William Neill lived here towards the end of the 1960s.
