= Gilmerton =

Suburb of Edinburgh, Scotland

Coordinates: 55.9069°N 3.1344°W

Gilmerton: Scots: Gilly
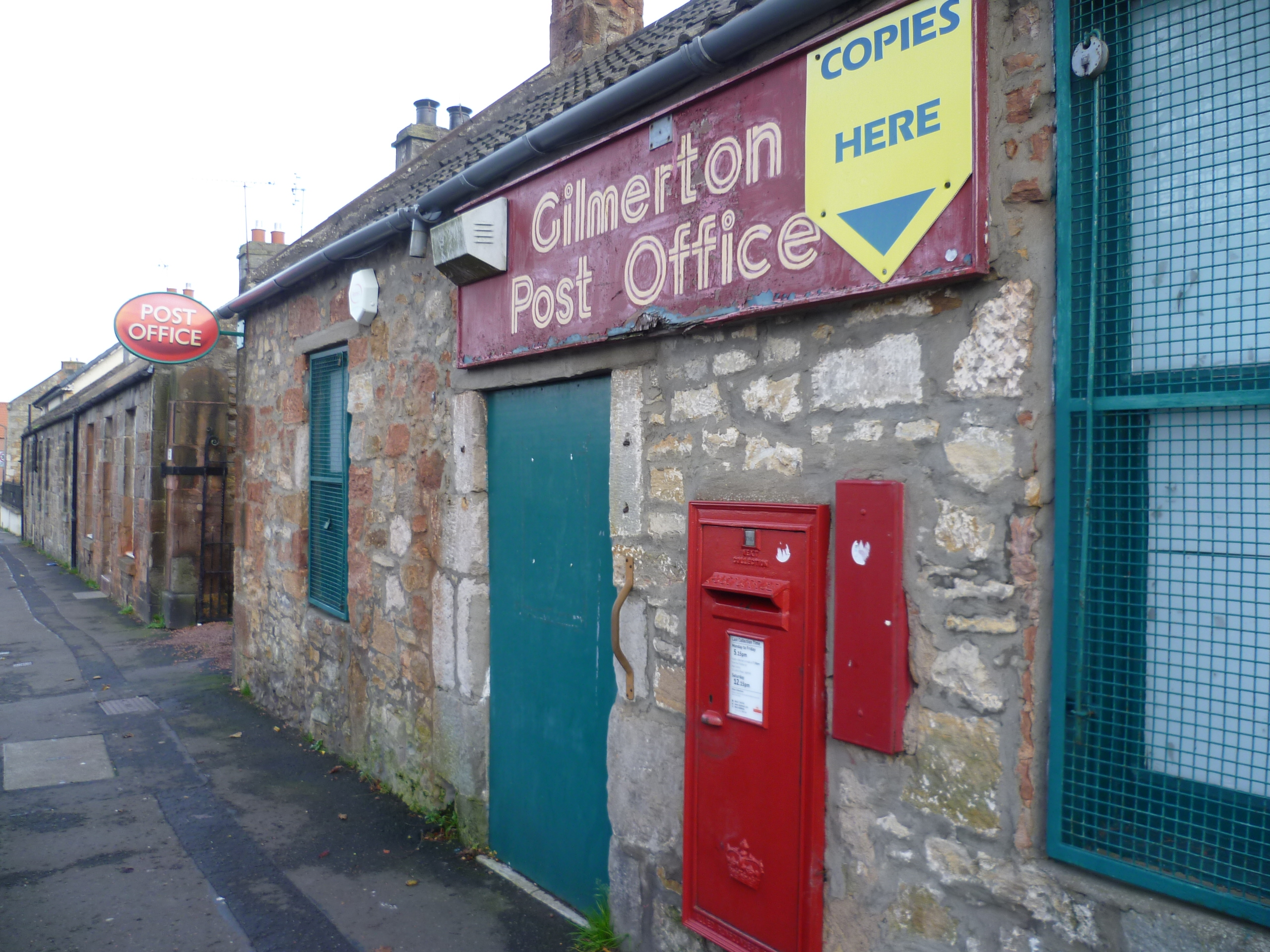
- Gilmerton Post Office

- Location within the City of Edinburgh council area Location within Scotland
- OS grid reference: NT2969
  - Edinburgh: 4 miles (6.4 km)
- Council area: City of Edinburgh
- Lieutenancy area: Edinburgh
- Country: Scotland
- Sovereign state: United Kingdom
- Post town: Edinburgh
- Police: Scotland
- Fire: Scottish
- Ambulance: Scottish
- UK Parliament: Edinburgh South
- Scottish Parliament: Edinburgh Eastern

Gilmerton is a village and suburb of Edinburgh, about 4 miles (6.4 km) southeast of the city centre.

The toponym "Gilmerton" is derived from a combination of Scottish Gaelic: Gille-Moire– a personal name and later surname meaning "Servant of [the Virgin] Mary", from which comes the first element, "Gilmer", – and Old English: ton meaning "settlement" or "farmstead". Versions of the name are recorded from the middle of the 12th century.

Below its centre is a series of shallow linked caves collectively called Gilmerton Cove. Traditionally these were attributed to the work of a local blacksmith, George Paterson (d.1735), who began work in 1720 and completed excavations in 1724 occupying these caves under his house and smiddy for eleven years. Paterson's name is inscribed on the lintel at the entrance.

The historic core of the village is a designated conservation area.

== History ==
Gilmerton was owned by the Somervilles of nearby Drum House in the 17th century but in 1685 passed to the Kinloch family who had property on the west side of the village.

Coal mining which began in the 16th century gave way to limestone mining in the 19th century. As a parish, Gilmerton was a quoad sacra parish linked to Liberton Church with a chapel of ease being built here in 1837 on Ravenscroft Street.

The village expanded substantially in the decades following the Second World War as new public housing estates of varying design were constructed, connecting Gilmerton with Liberton. Private housebuilding in the late 20th and early 21st century extended the local built environment further south towards the Edinburgh City Bypass (A720) road and the local authority boundary with Midlothian.

== Community facilities ==
Gilmerton Library serves a number of informal learning sessions and community events. Bookbug Sessions, Book groups, Knitting Group, iPads for the visually impaired, Tiger Tales stories and crafts for ages 4 – 8, Friday Fun Club for kids, NHS Lothian Stop Smoking Group, and Local Councillors' surgeries.

Gilmerton Community Centre has a varied daytime and evening programme of educational and leisure activities as well as support groups. The Centre is a vibrant and busy place with a large reception area with 4 computers allowing internet access. Printing and photocopying facilities are also available and there are always staff and volunteers on hand to give help, information and advice. There are 4 general purposes rooms, two crèche rooms, a computer suite, and a small hall all available for hire. A busy café also operates from the centre. A number of outside agencies are based in the Centre including a Women’s mental health project, a Drugs project and a Befriending project for young people.

Ferniehill surgery has 6 doctors and a number of practice nurses, health visitors and district nurses. Surgeries are offered throughout the day from 8.30am to 5.30pm.

A child and family centre was purpose built and opened in 1964. It is part of the City of Edinburgh Councils, Children and Families Department. The Centre has four playrooms to accommodate children aged 0–5. There is also a large kitchen area and separate laundry. The outside area is on two levels, one area is with slabbing which is used for toys including bikes, scooters, sand, water play etc. The other area has soft surfacing and sited climbing frame equipment and chutes.

Gilmerton Primary School and two nearby Secondary Schools (Liberton High School and Gracemount High School) serve the Gilmerton area.

== Politics ==
Gilmerton once used to have its own council ward (ward 56) within Edinburgh city, which included the communities of Ferniehill and Hyvots. Since 2007, The Local Government Boundary Commission for Scotland amalgamated Gilmerton with the neighbouring town of Liberton to create the Council ward Liberton/Gilmerton (16) that incorporates Gracemount, Burdiehouse, Southhouse, The Inch and Moredun.

The City of Edinburgh Council election, 2017 saw Liberton/Gilmerton vote in 4 councillors.

- Lezley Marion Cameron (Labour)
- Derek Howie (SNP)
- Lesley MacInnes (SNP)
- Stephanie Smith (Conservative).

Gilmerton is in the Edinburgh South constituency for parliament in Westminster, and is represented by Ian Murray (British politician) (Labour). It falls within the Edinburgh Eastern for the Scottish Parliament, and is represented by Ash Denham (SNP)

== Demographics ==
Ethnicity	Liberton/Gilmerton Ward	Edinburgh
White	82.6%	84.9%
Asian	10.2%	8.6%
Black	2.7%	2.1%
Mixed	2.4%	2.5%
Other	2.1%	1.9%

== Notable people ==
- Dr Joseph Tillie FRSE
- David Paton
- Kinloch baronets including the murderer Sir Archibald Gordon Kinloch, 7th Baronet

== Trivia ==
A street in the Dunedin, New Zealand suburb of Corstorphine, Gilmerton Street, is named after the suburb.

== See also ==
- The Drum, Edinburgh
