= Parkgrove =

Suburb of Edinburgh, Scotland

Coordinates: 55°57′33″N 3°17′39″W

Parkgrove is a suburb of Edinburgh, the capital of Scotland. Approximately 4 miles north-west of Edinburgh city centre. The suburb is located between the neighbouring areas of Clermiston, Barnton and Davidson's Mains.

Parkgrove houses local amenities including Clermiston Primary School, Parkgrove Medical Centre, Barnton Dental Spa and the Munro Community Centre. Local shops are located on Parkgrove Street, consisting of the local newsagents, deli and barber shop, with Parkgrove Shopping Centre situated on Queensferry Road, housing a Tesco Express, Baines Bakers, Omnicare Pharmacy, Majestic Wine Warehouse and Tony Macaroni Italian restaurant.

== Sources ==
(Google Maps)
