= Moredun =

Area of Edinburgh, Scotland

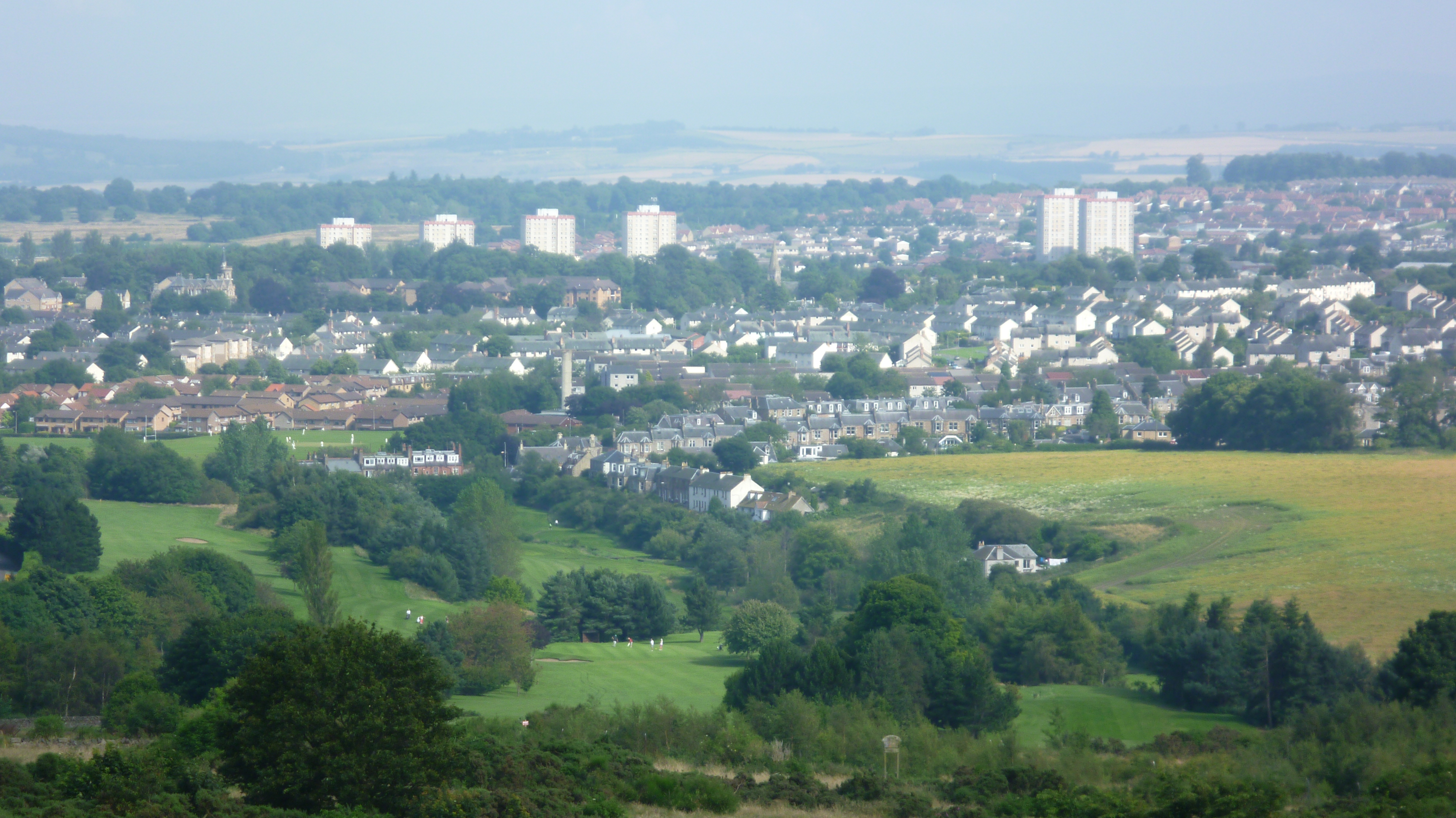
View of Moredun from Blackford Hill

Moredun is a district in the south-east of Edinburgh, the capital of Scotland. It is east of Liberton, while Craigour is situated just to its north.

The estate of Gut-tres or Goodtrees was the family home of James Stewart but it was renamed Moredun House in 1769 by the new owner, David Stuart Moncrieff, in recognition of a hill on his Perthshire estate. The house was acquired in 1923 to convert into a convalescent home for ex-servicemen. It was instead found unsuitable and demolished. The facility was instead created in the form of the Murray Homes for the Scottish Veterans Association in 1929. Part of the estate was also sold in 1924 to create the Moredun Research Institute.

In the late 1960s six tower blocks were built in the area; whilst all six remain standing, a large project was undertaken to refurbish them to coincide with the construction of the new Edinburgh Royal Infirmary nearby. Two of the 16-storey blocks – Moncreiffe House and Forteviot House – are within the geographical boundary of Moredun, while the other four are technically in neighbouring Craigour.

Moredun contains two clusters of shops on Moredun Park Road as well as a library and a primary school. It has transport links on a par with other similar areas of the city, with the Lothian Buses service 8 and Airlink 400 passing through the area, with the 3, 7 and 29 services running nearby.

== Craigour ==
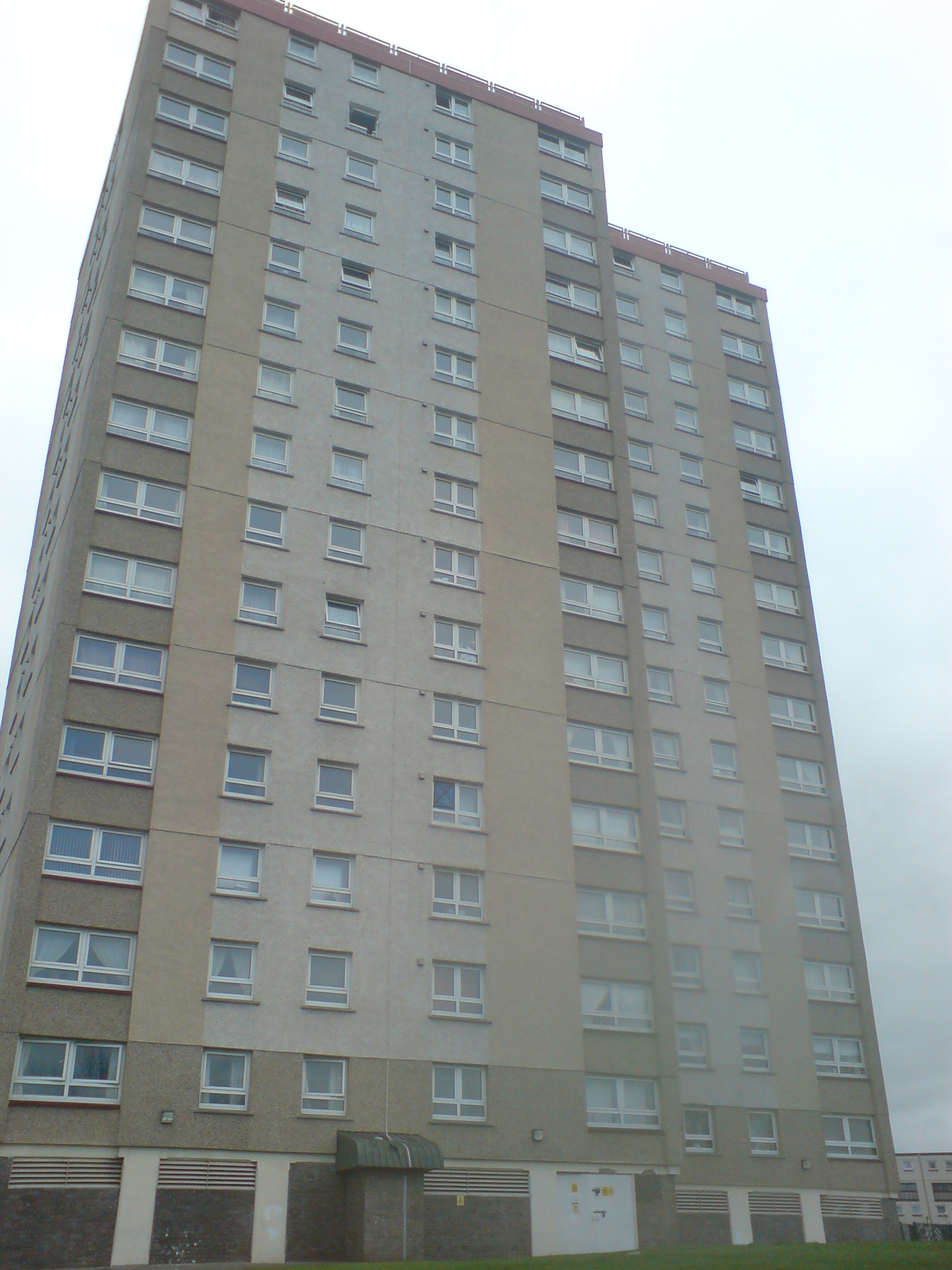
Castleview House, one of four tower blocks in the area

Craigour (55°54′53″N 3°8′15.5″W) is a neighbourhood of southeast Edinburgh, Scotland, next to the A7 (Old Dalkeith Road). It is surrounded on the east by the Edinburgh Royal Infirmary just across the A7; on the north by Liberton Golf Club; and on the west and south by the neighbourhoods of Moredun, Moredunvale and Fernieside. The Burdiehouse Burn flows through the area.

For such a small area, Craigour consists of a wide variety of house types. Some prefabs built in the 1950s still exist; however, most of these have been replaced by newer and permanent housing. There is 1980s private housing in a band immediately next to the A7, as well as council housing in the form of maisonettes plus four high-rise (16-storey) blocks (Castleview House, Little France House, Marytree House and Moredun House). Along the A7 road which passes Craigour to the east, are Victorian and pre-Victorian houses, in the form of the Little France and Pentecox clusters of houses.

Craigour has a nearby primary school (technically just outwith its boundaries between Moredun and Fernieside) and bookmaker. It previously had a pub, which has since closed.

== Demographics ==
Ethnicity	Liberton/Gilmerton Ward	Edinburgh
White	82.6%	84.9%
Asian	10.2%	8.6%
Black	2.7%	2.1%
Mixed	2.4%	2.5%
Other	2.1%	1.9%

== See also ==
- Moredun Research Institute
