= Wester Hailes =

Suburb of Edinburgh, Scotland

Coordinates: 55°55′0.76″N 3°16′58.21″W

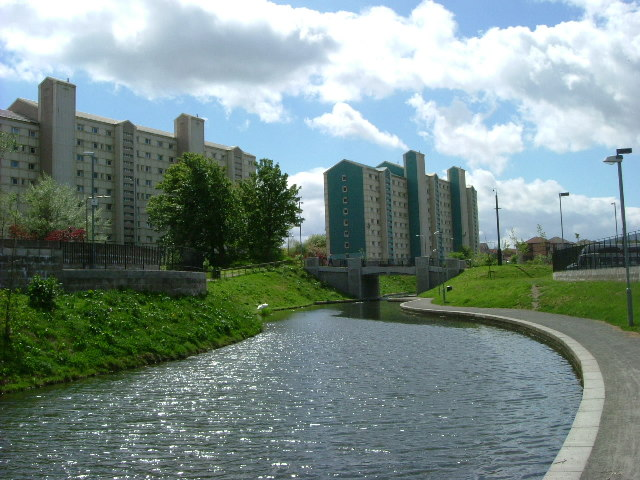
- Union Canal, Wester Hailes

- Location within the City of Edinburgh council area Location within Scotland
- OS grid reference: NT197700
- Council area: City of Edinburgh
- Lieutenancy area: Edinburgh
- Country: Scotland
- Sovereign state: United Kingdom
- Post town: EDINBURGH
- Postcode district: EH14
- Dialling code: 0131
- Police: Scotland
- Fire: Scottish
- Ambulance: Scottish
- UK Parliament: Edinburgh South West
- Scottish Parliament: Edinburgh Pentlands

Wester Hailes is an area in the south west of Edinburgh, Scotland.

Wester Hailes borders on Kingsknowe and Longstone to the east. Bankhead Industrial Estate and Sighthill Park lie to the north.

== History ==
The area was not named after a large private house, nor a farm of the same name, as is often claimed. Before anything at all was built on the area it was already called Wester Halas. Wester Halas, Halas being the historic root of Hailes, and therefore Wester Hailes, first appeared in historical records in 1095 AD, when Ethelred, son of King Malcolm III (Malcolm Canmore), granted land known as Halas to Dunfermline Abbey. Halas originates from Old English or Anglo-Saxon terms meaning land situated near a river, nook, or a flat area by water. In this case, the Murray Burn to the north and the Water of Leith to the south

The area was not substantially developed until the early-1970s, which is reflected in the dominant housing styles, mainly purpose-built flats and tower blocks.

It was extensively redeveloped during the 1990s and 2000s, with a large number of properties being renovated and some others -such as the high rise "slab block" flats at Hailesland Park being demolished and replaced with newer "low rise" housing. As well as council and private housing, there is a community housing association called Prospect Community Housing based in Westburn Avenue, who have housing in the Westburn, Clovenstone, Walkers, Barn Park areas of Wester Hailes.

== Facilities ==
Westside Plaza is the main social and shopping hub of the area, comprising a public house, Jobcentre, council housing office, library, newsagent, an arcade, an Odeon cinema and a collection of shops both adjacent to and inside the Wester Hailes Shopping Centre. A post office, optician, pharmacy, and a dentist can be found inside the latter. The indoor market closed in 2014, and the space re-opened in 2015 as a gym.

Local education centres include Stevenson College, the Wester Hailes Education Centre, the WHALE Arts Centre, the Sighthill campus of Napier University and the main campus of Heriot-Watt University to the west, in Riccarton.

A swimming pool is located in the Wester Hailes Education Centre.

== Transport links ==
The main points of arrival and departure for Wester Hailes are the string of bus stops located on the northern edge of Westside Plaza (formerly Wester Hailes Shopping Centre), and the railway station a short distance to the south.

Bus services departing here are the 3, 21, 30, 33, 400, X40, N30, N400 provided by Lothian Buses and 20 provided by McGill's Scotland East, with destinations including the city centre, Gyle Shopping Centre, Livingston, the Hermiston Gait shopping complex and the Royal Infirmary of Edinburgh at Little France. Service 44 passes nearby to the south on its way to Currie and Balerno; services 25, 34 and 35 pass nearby to the north, with destinations including Hermiston Park & Ride and Heriot-Watt University's Riccarton Campus. There is also pedestrian and cycle access east towards the city centre, via the Union Canal.

== Demographics ==
Ethnicity	Pentland Hills Ward	Edinburgh
White	86.3%	84.9%
Asian	5.8%	8.6%
Black	4.5%	2.1%
Mixed	1.7%	2.5%
Other	1.8%	1.9%

== Notable people ==
- Tommy Smith, jazz saxophonist.
- Supermodel Eunice Olumide grew up in Wester Hailes.
