= Forrester, Edinburgh =

Residential area in Edinburgh, Scotland

Coordinates: 55.93205°N 3.28491°W

Forrester is a primarily residential area of Corstorphine, Edinburgh which has its own high school and rugby club. The closest railway stations are at South Gyle and Edinburgh Park, but it is itself wedged between the two railway lines. It is not to be confused with "Forrester Road", which is on the other side of Corstorphine on the slopes of Corstophine Hill. It is named for the Forrester Family, who used to be the lairds of Corstorphine.

The area is featured in the novel Trainspotting by Irvine Welsh.

== Schools ==
The area is next to Forrester High School, and St Augustines RC High School.
