= Parkhead, Edinburgh =

Suburb of Edinburgh, Scotland

Coordinates: 55°55′26″N 3°15′30″W

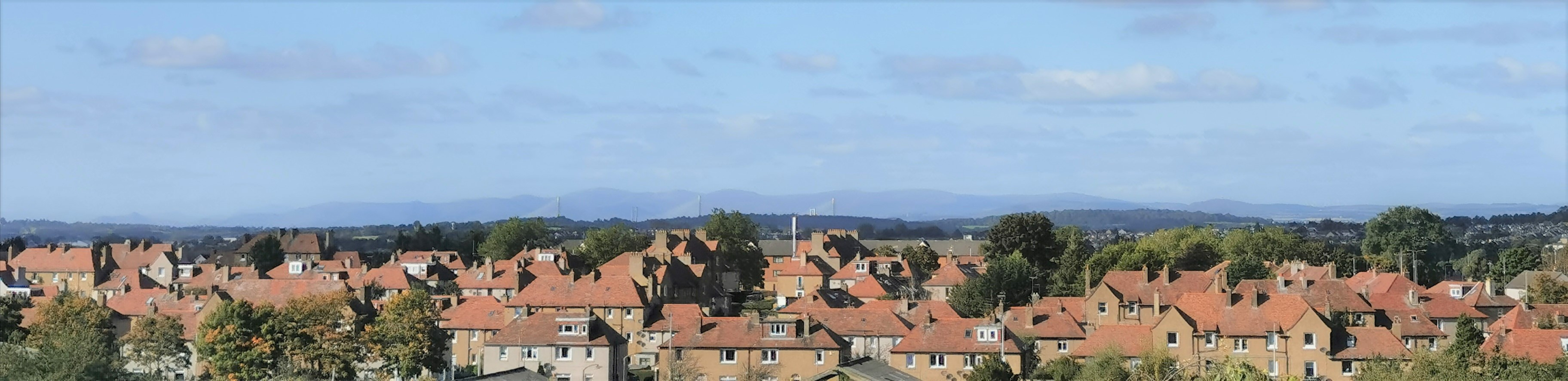
Panoramic view of Parkhead, Edinburgh.

Parkhead is a residential area of Edinburgh, the capital of Scotland. It was one of the smallest wards in the Edinburgh City Council before a reorganisation into larger multi-member wards in 2007; since then it has been part of the Sighthill/Gorgie ward.

Located about 4 miles (6.4 km) south-west of the city centre, the area was built in 1940s and contains low-rise houses, mainly in the cottage flat (four-in-a-block) format with Art Deco features and unique red roofs. Parkhead is bounded to the north by the A71 Calder Road (with the Fairbrae and Broomhouse neighbourhoods beyond), to the east by Longstone Road and a development at 'The Green' completed in 2021, to the west by Sighthill, and to the south by Murrayburn Road (opposite the Lothian Buses Longstone Depot, as well as the Murrayburn Depot which in 2019 has been secured for the future housing development of around 200 units).
