= Alnwickhill =

Suburb of Edinburgh, Scotland

Coordinates: 55°54′21.24″N 3°10′8.39″W

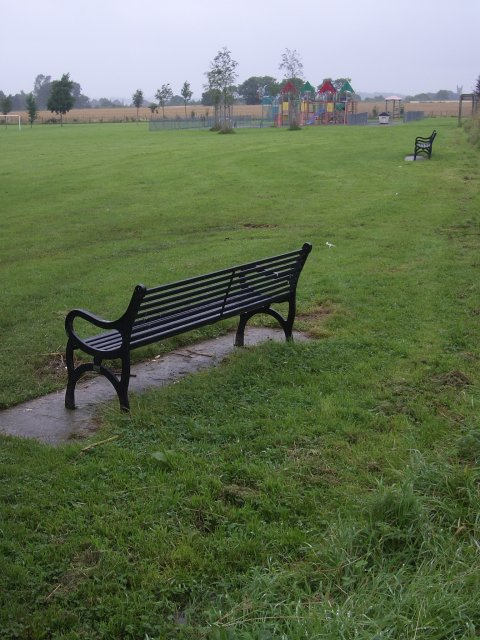

- Location within the City of Edinburgh council area Location within Scotland
- OS grid reference: NT271688
- Council area: City of Edinburgh
- Lieutenancy area: Edinburgh
- Country: Scotland
- Sovereign state: United Kingdom
- Post town: EDINBURGH
- Postcode district: EH16
- Dialling code: 0131
- Police: Scotland
- Fire: Scottish
- Ambulance: Scottish
- UK Parliament: Edinburgh South
- Scottish Parliament: Edinburgh Eastern

Alnwickhill (/ˈænɪkhɪl/ AN-ik-hill) is a suburb of Edinburgh, the capital of Scotland. It is on the southern edge of the city, approximately 4 miles (6.4 km) from the city centre. It neighbours the areas of Liberton and Kaimes.

The area is now primarily residential, but was the site of Backside Lee Farm until the 1970s when the land was sold to Crudens for development.

== Alnwickhill Reservoir and Waterworks ==
The waterworks, including a covered treated water reservoir and open settling ponds, were designed in 1875 by the civil engineer James Leslie. A second covered reservoir was added in 1888 giving a total capacity of 15 million gallons. Each covered reservoir had an outlet house built in Classic style. The builder was James Young and Son. Initially, the main water source was Gladhouse Reservoir in the Moorfoot Hills and the works supplied East Edinburgh, Leith and Portobello. In 1905 the supply was supplemented by the Talla Reservoir to cope with the growing population. It was created a listed building in 1996. The waterworks were closed in 2012 on completion of new waterworks at Glencorse Reservoir. The site has been restored and developed for housing. One of the covered reservoirs remains.
