= Burdiehouse =

Area of Edinburgh, Scotland

Coordinates: 55°53′50.30″N 3°9′31.01″W

Burdiehouse: Scots: BurdieHoose
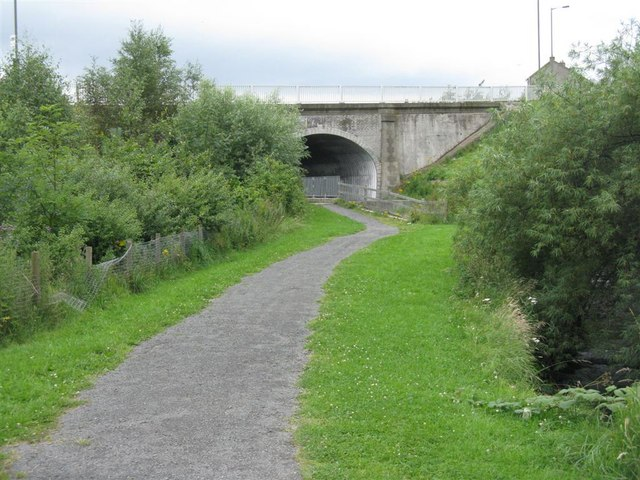

- Location within the City of Edinburgh council area Location within Scotland
- OS grid reference: NT274672
- Council area: City of Edinburgh
- Lieutenancy area: Edinburgh
- Country: Scotland
- Sovereign state: United Kingdom
- Post town: EDINBURGH
- Postcode district: EH17
- Dialling code: 0131
- Police: Scotland
- Fire: Scottish
- Ambulance: Scottish
- UK Parliament: Edinburgh South
- Scottish Parliament: Edinburgh Eastern

Burdiehouse; Scots: Burdiehoose, is an area in the south east of Edinburgh, Scotland, near Gilmerton, Gracemount and Southhouse. The name may be a corruption of the name Bordeaux, from French immigrants who lived in the area.

Today, Burdiehouse is an area with a high level of residents living in poverty.

The Burdiehouse Burn (known elsewhere as the Lothian Burn, Niddrie Burn and Brunstane Burn) flows through the area.

== Etymology ==
James Grant ascribes the area's name to a corruption of "Bordeaux House". He suggests this name may be derived from French members of the entourage of Mary, Queen of Scots who lived for a time at Craigmillar Castle (which also led to the name of the nearby Little France). Grant prefers the explanation that the area was the home of silk weavers who had emigrated from Picardy.

== Limeworks ==
Burdiehouse was locally known for its limestone deposits especially in the 18th and 19th centuries. Three lime kilns on Burdiehouse are now listed buildings. The deposits were rich in fossils and a "large reptile" fossil found in 1833 was presented to the Royal Society of Edinburgh.
