= Maybury =

Area on the western edge of Edinburgh, Scotland

Coordinates: 55°56′29″N 3°18′49″W

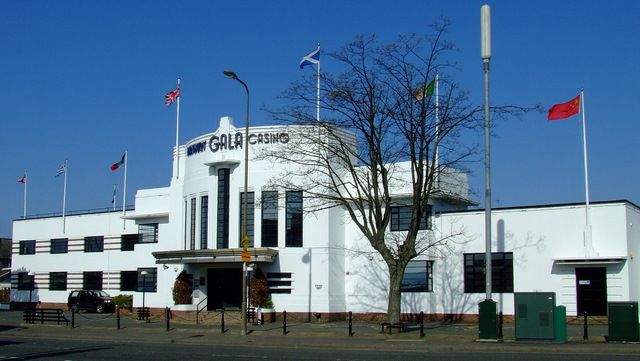
Maybury Roadhouse

Maybury is an area on the western edge of Edinburgh, Scotland, near South Gyle and Ingliston, named after the road, which is itself named after the civil engineer Sir Henry Maybury (1864–1943). In 2021, residents have been undertaking community clean ups to clear the foot paths along the road. The area is residential in the north east/east and commercial in the south and west and The Gyle Shopping Centre is nearby. In 2021, there was a consultation about creating a Primary School and Health Centre in Maybury.

== Historic buildings ==
Dominated by a major road junction, the most notable feature is the Maybury Roadhouse, built in 1936 and one of Edinburgh's examples of Art Deco architecture, it was designed by Paterson and Broom. It was converted into a casino in the late 1990s. The casino has retained many art deco features within the building. It is a listed building, category B. Nearby are two other listed buildings,138-140 Glasgow Road, where are traditional farm cottages, originally belonging to North Gyle Farm. The cottages were the result of the 19th century drives to the living conditions of farm workers and are Category C listed buildings. North Gyle Farm is also a Category C listed building nearby. There is a police box and Cook's Garage that were built or recorded as existing in the 1930s and that are still in the area today.

== History and archaeology ==
The area was farmland and the former Gogar Loch, though historical records in the 1600s describe the loch not as a standing body of water but as an area full of bogs and marshes. Archaeological excavations, between 1990 and 1992, in advance of development found a Neolithic trackway, evidence for Bronze Age settlement and a large stone-built structure dating to the beginning of the first millennium AD. The archaeologists believe the area was first settled in the Neolithic by farmers and that this agricultural work continued on into modern day, though probably not always continuous.

== Images ==
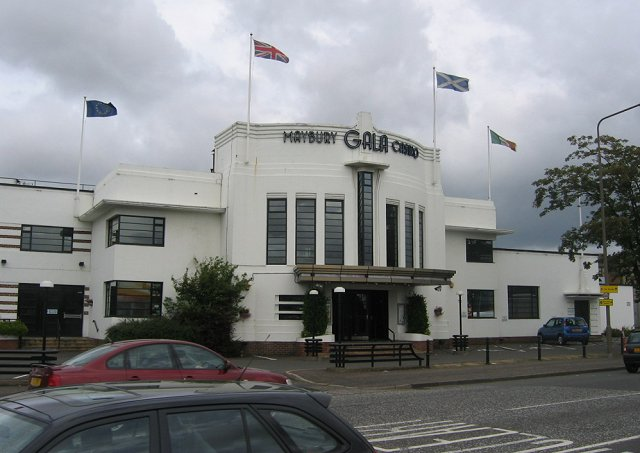
Maybury Roadhouse

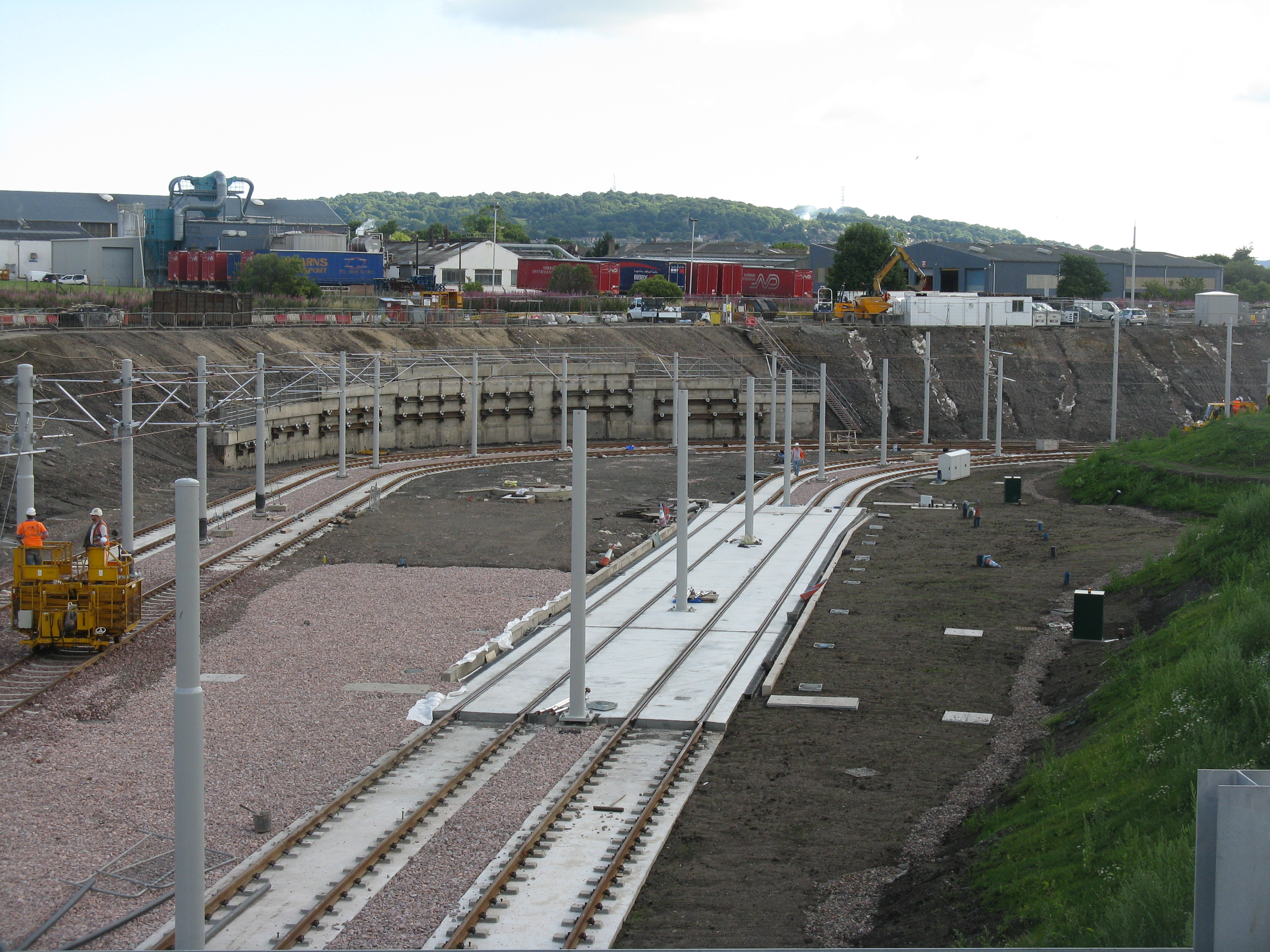
Edinburgh trams at the Maybury

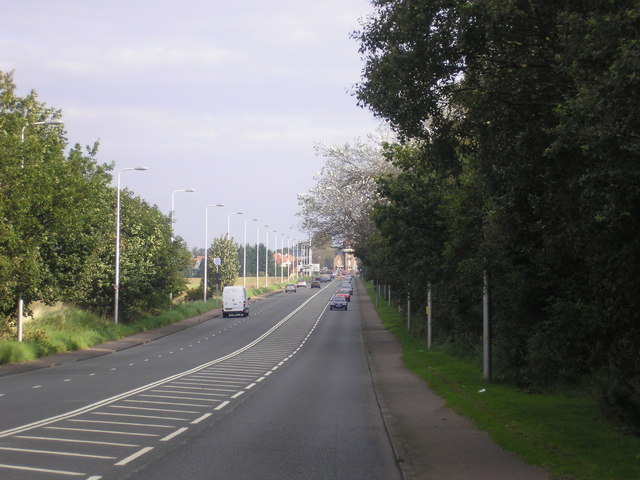
Maybury Road
