= East Craigs =

Residential district of Edinburgh, Scotland

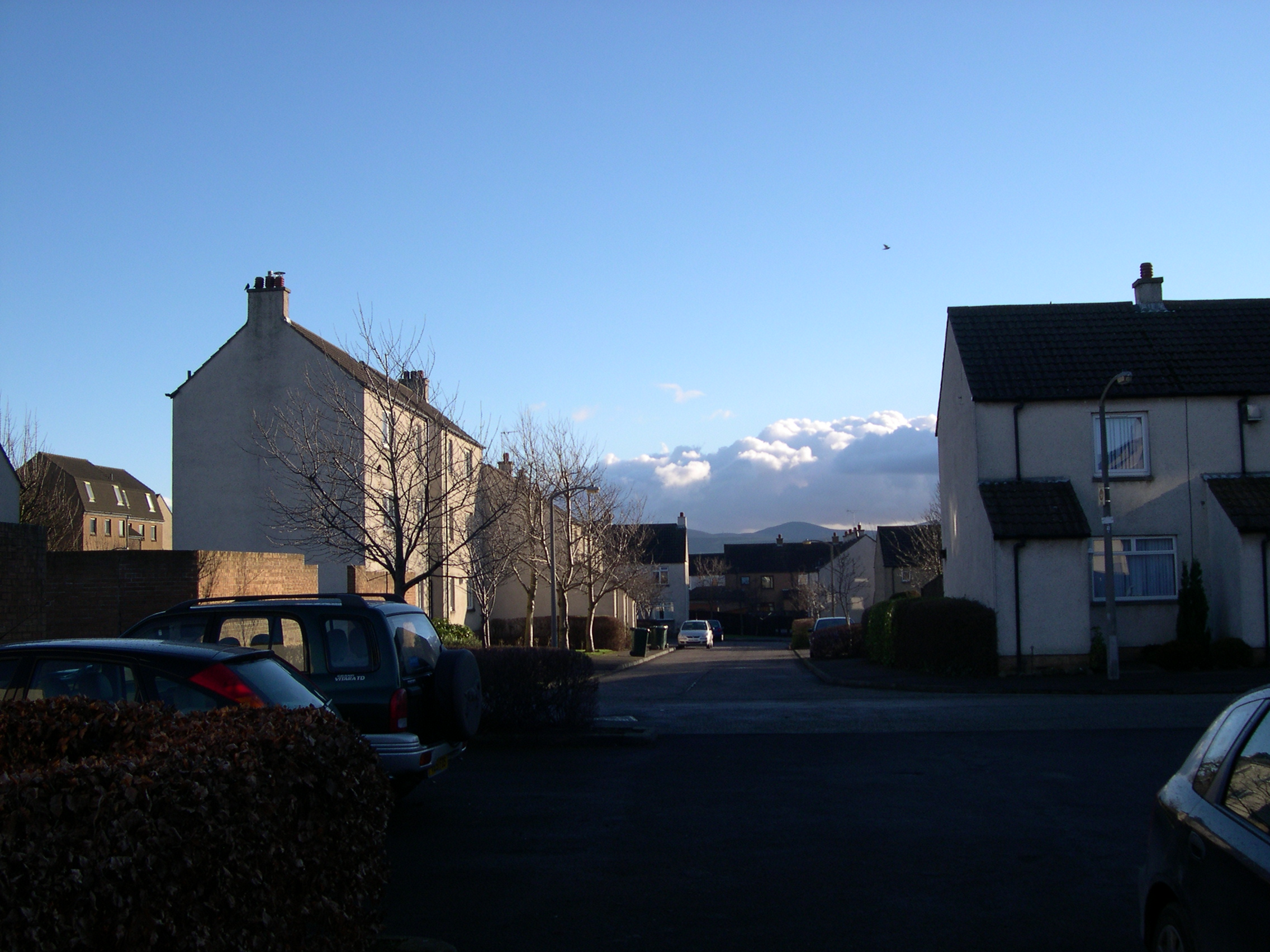
Typical suburban housing in East Craigs.

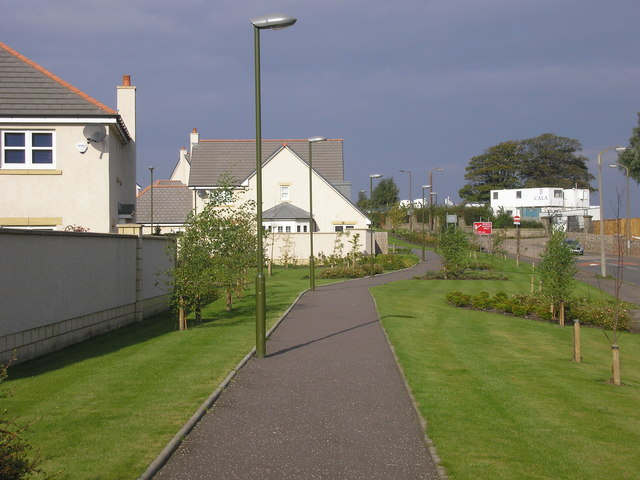

East Craigs is a residential district of Edinburgh located in the north-west of the city, on the western flanks of Corstorphine Hill. It lies next to what remains of the green belt, and prior to development was a working farm.

Development of the area began in 1922 when East Craigs Farm was purchased by the Scottish Agricultural Science Agency (SASA) as a centre for agricultural research. However, much of the land was made available to housing developers from the 1930s onwards. It neighbours West Craigs (which is much less developed, at present), Craigmount, Maybury, Drumbrae and Corstorphine.

== History ==
"Craigs" is an old Broad Scots word for rocks, derived from Celtic, and it is named in contradistinction to nearby "West Craigs". Corstorphine Hill was formerly known as "Corstorphine Craigs".

The oldest building in East Craigs is East Craigs House (55°56′56″N 3°18′36″W), built in 1768 with a semi-octagonal stairwell added c.1800. It once formed part of the now-demolished SASA complex, and has recently been restored as part of the new residential development there. New developments of small family-sized houses and low-rise flats were built in the 1970s and 1980s and more since the 2000s.

In the neighbouring estate of Craigmount which is part of Corstorphine and was developed before the Second World War, there are numerous bungalows and spacious family houses.

Craigmount High School is situated between East Craigs, Corstorphine and Drumbrae and serves the East Craigs area, amongst others. It was built in 1970 to alleviate pressure on surrounding secondary schools. A new building opened at the beginning of the 2003 academic year, built on the old playing fields of the original school. East Craigs Primary School was built in 1979 to accommodate an influx of families moving into newly built housing nearby. The nearest Roman Catholic schools are Fox Covert R.C. Primary School and St.Augustine's High School.

The Bughtlin Burn flows through the area. The names of many roads and developments in East Craigs reflect the area's farming past, e.g. Hayfield, Mearenside, Burnbrae.

Bughtlin Green and Bughtlin Loan were two of the earliest developments in East Craigs, built by local builder (and ex-Hibs owner) Tom Hart. Almond Green, which was also built by Hart in 1974, was actually split into two areas, with a small grass and play area joining them. Almond Square (built at the same time) is adjacent. Maybury Telephone Exchange was also positioned opposite the entrance to Almond Green and served the area with 031-339 numbers, then later with 0131-317 and 339.

Safeway opened what was then, the largest of their stores in Scotland, in 1981 at Bughtlin Market. There were a small row of shops around Safeway : John Menzies (the newsagent), Jane Montgomery (hairdresser), a chemist and a video hire shop. East Craigs Medical Centre serves as a doctor's surgery to much of East Craigs, Corstorphine, Clermiston, Drumbrae and the Gyle area, and is situated next to East Craigs Church Centre. There is also a dental practice adjacent to the surgery. These were developed next to the East Craigs Church Centre, which is one of two worship and community centres of the local Craigsbank Church of Scotland parish.

When Morrisons bought over Safeway in 2004, the store soon became a Morrisons; however, due to competition regulation, Morrisons were forced to sell the store to Somerfield as Morrisons has also acquired a Safeway in the nearby Gyle Shopping Centre. With a Tesco Extra a couple of miles away from East Craigs, Somerfield were forced to shut up shop, and the store and surrounding row (originally leased by Safeway) were later demolished for housing and a new small complex of shops including a Co-operative, pharmacy and a takeaway.

The Mid Yoken pub was included as part of the original development, as a provision for the community. The name commemorates the spot nearby, which was the site of an old steading which has long since gone. The steading was the middle meeting place of the local ploughmen, and also where horses would be yoked to the plough. The name mid-yoken, probably means “The middle place to yoke the horses”. However the Scots dictionary also states that a Mid yokin is "a break in the middle of a yokin". Here, Yokin means "period during which a horse is in harness at one stretch"

The area is served by the Lothian Buses 31, which uses the turning circle outside the Mid Yoken Pub as its terminus. Until the early 2000s, East Craigs was also served by the now-defunct 82 route.

== See also ==
- Craigievar Estate
