= Ravelston =

Area of Edinburgh, Scotland

Coordinates: 55°57′11″N 3°14′52″W

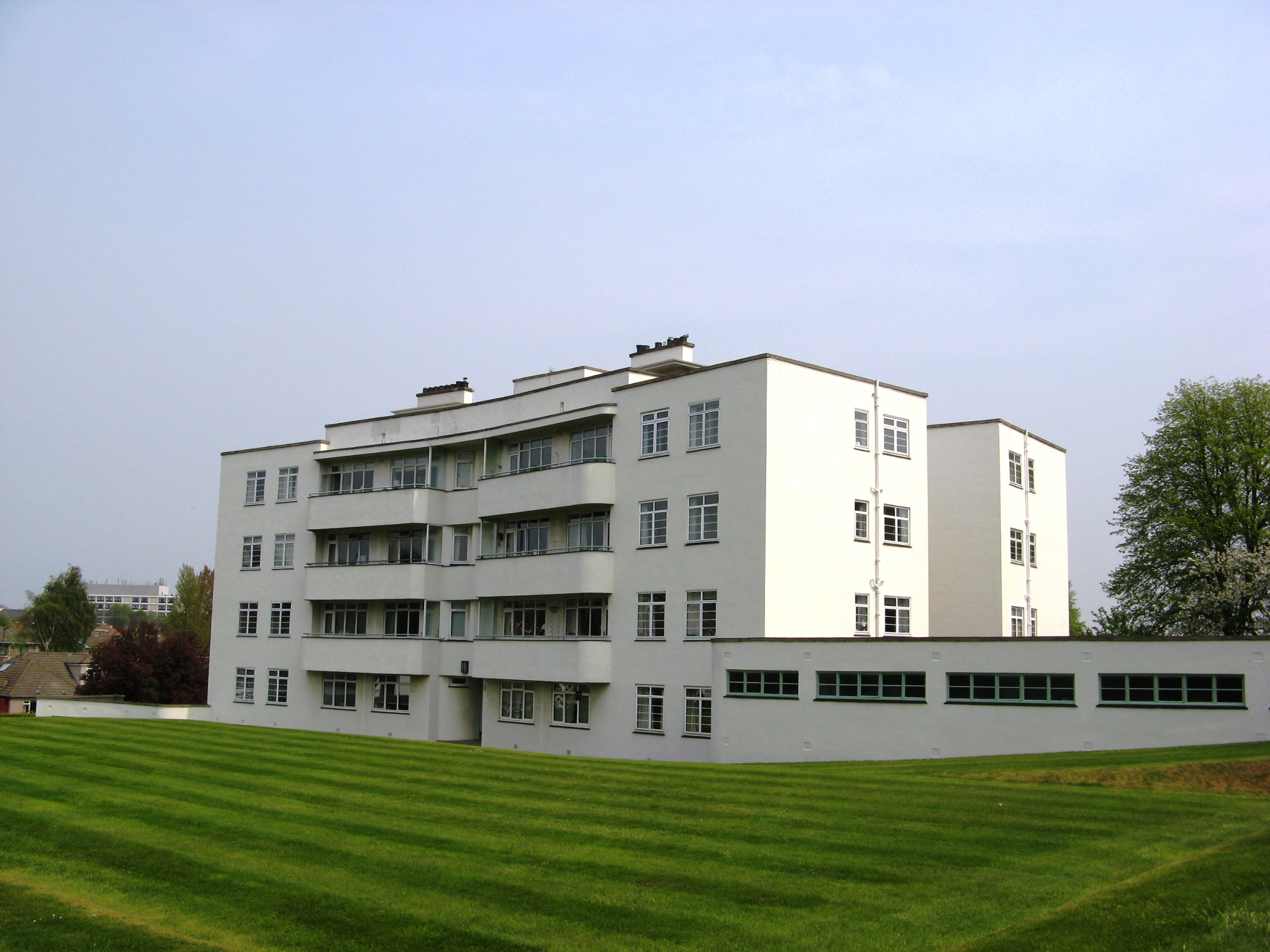
Ravelston Garden, a category A listed modernist apartment block

Ravelston is an area of Edinburgh, Scotland, to the west of the city centre, the east of Corstorphine and Clermiston, the north of Murrayfield, West End and Roseburn and to the south of Queensferry Road (the A90). Ravelston is often considered to be part of the larger neighbouring area of Murrayfield.

The area is primarily made up of fairly large detached and semi-detached family homes, as well as modern apartments and many bungalows. To the east of Ravelston Terrace is the Dean Path and Water of Leith Walkway, while to the west lies Ravelston Dykes Golf Club, sandwiched between Ravelston and Corstorphine Hill.

Ravelston is home to the Mary Erskine School, an independent school incorporated into Stewart's Melville College which is on the far east side of Ravelston, both owned by the Merchant Company of Edinburgh.

The former Faith Mission Bible College was in a Victorian house in Ravelston from 1886 to 1986, before moving to Gilmerton.

Ravelston Garden is a 1930s listed building in the area. There are also other notable buildings including the slightly older Ravelston Lea, a large detached villa typical of the better housing in the area.

== Notable residents ==
- Sir Godfrey Thomson lived at 5 Ravelston Dykes.
