= Saughtonhall =

Suburb of Edinburgh, Scotland

Coordinates: 55.94151°N 3.24911°W

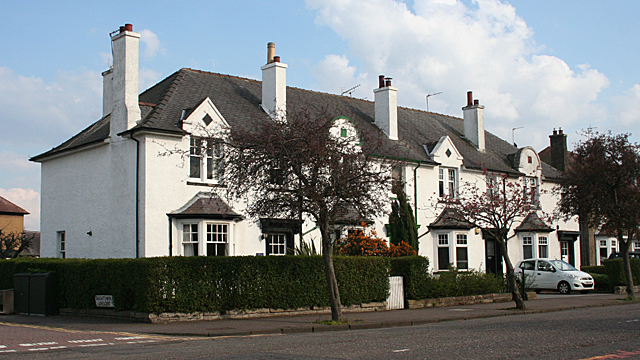
- Terraced houses on Saughtonhall Drive

- Location within the City of Edinburgh council area Location within Scotland
- Council area: City of Edinburgh
- Country: Scotland
- Sovereign state: United Kingdom
- Post town: EDINBURGH
- Postcode district: EH12
- Dialling code: 0131
- Police: Scotland
- Fire: Scottish
- Ambulance: Scottish
- UK Parliament: Edinburgh West
- Scottish Parliament: Edinburgh Central

Saughtonhall is a residential neighbourhood in the west of Edinburgh, Scotland, bordering Balgreen directly to the south and south-west, Murrayfield to the north (on the opposite side of Corstorphine Road (A8)), Carrick Knowe golf course to the west (bounded by the route of the Corstorphine Branch railway which is now a section of the pedestrian John Muir Way), and sports facilities (including Murrayfield Stadium, Murrayfield Ice Rink, Edinburgh Rugby Stadium and Roseburn Park cricket ground) on the opposite bank of the Water of Leith and its walkway to the east, connected by several footbridges which now also incorporate flooding defences. It is within the Corstorphine/Murrayfield ward under the City of Edinburgh Council.

== Description ==
Although named after Saughton Hall, a local historic country house, the neighbourhood is not located where the mansion stood – that was at Saughton Park about 0.5 miles (0.80 km) to the south, while the area that became Saughtonhall was farmland until after the First World War when the city expanded amid housing reform. An explanation is that the main thoroughfare in the area was named Saughtonhall Drive when it was laid out due to it running south-west from its origin at the crossroads of Corstorphine Road and Ellersley Road known as Western Corner (at this point Corstorphine Road has the secondary name of Western Terrace) towards the mansion, and most secondary streets also took this name. A convenience store is situated at the other end of Saughtonhall Drive where it forms a V-junction with the slightly older Balgreen Road, which in turn continues to Gorgie Road (A71) further south. A prominent landmark at that junction is the 1920s depository for Jenners department store, itself Category B listed. There is also a range of local shops at Western Corner.

Housing in the area is primarily an inter-war period 'garden suburb' mix, comprising four-in-a-block apartments with the upper flats accessed via a common stairway in the middle of the building, two-level homes in terrace rows, and detached bungalows. Modern properties have sporadically filled most spaces which once existed. There is an eponymous community association with its own premises and orchard, and a United Reformed Church which has been in situ since the neighbourhood's establishment in 1929. In the north of the area in close proximity to one another on Saughton Crescent are two nursery schools, a medical centre and a scout hall; there is also a larger clinic on Corstophine Road. In addition to the rugby stadia, golf course and public parks, there is are clubs for tennis (Murrayfield, dating from 1904) and lawn bowls / croquet (Balgreen) at either end of Saughtonhall.

The closest public transport connection in the south of the neighbourhood is Edinburgh Trams's Balgreen stop, beyond which Gorgie Road is a busy corridor for Lothian Buses; to the north, several bus routes run along Corstorphine Road. In the mid 20th century, there were train stations to the north-west and south at Pinkhill and Balgreen Halt respectively.

As of the early 2020s, the neighbourhood was split in terms of catchment zones for both public schooling paths, though along different divisions: the majority of streets are allocated to non-denominational Balgreen Primary (feeding to Tynecastle High School) but those in the north-east are allocated to Roseburn Primary (feeding to Craigmount High School), while for Catholic education the northern streets are allocated to Fox Covert Primary but the southern streets are allocated to St Cuthbert's Primary (both feeding to St Augustine's High School).
