= Balgreen =

Suburb of Edinburgh, Scotland

Coordinates: 55°56′34″N 003°15′23″W

- Corstorphine Hill, seen in the south from a residential street in Balgreen

- Location within the City of Edinburgh council area Location within Scotland
- OS grid reference: NT2188427537
- Council area: City of Edinburgh
- Country: Scotland
- Sovereign state: United Kingdom
- Post town: Edinburgh
- Postcode district: EH12, EH11
- Dialling code: 0131
- Police: Scotland
- Fire: Scottish
- Ambulance: Scottish
- UK Parliament: Edinburgh West
- Scottish Parliament: Edinburgh Central

Balgreen (/bɔːlˈɡriːn/ or /bɔːˈɡriːn/) is a suburb of Edinburgh, located approximately two miles west of the city centre, most commonly known for its primary school, Balgreen Primary. It is located to the west of Murrayfield and Saughtonhall, to the east of Corstorphine, and to the north of Gorgie. It is bound to the north by Corstorphine Hill, to the west by Carrick Knowe Golf Course, and roughly to the east by Water of Leith.

== Etymology ==
The name comes from Balgreen House once situated where Balgreen School now stands and is probably derived from Scottish Gaelic, perhaps being Baile na Grèine (sunny farm ) or Baile Griain (gravel farm) from the gravel on the riverbank, or perhaps from Baile Grianain (farm of the sunny enclosure). It does not, as some etymologies have suggested, come from "Ball Green". The Gaelic "Bal-" (farm) prefix can also be found in Balerno and is not unusual in the area. The placename Balgreen is also found near Murieston and Ecclesmachanin West Lothian.

== Amenities ==
The Water of Leith flows through here with the Water of Leith Walkway connecting the area to Stockbridge to the north east and Colinton and Balerno to the south west. There is also a library, primary school, and a large park here, with facilities for football (soccer) etc., and a children's playpark.

== Transport ==
Balgreen was served by Balgreen Halt railway station which was closed in 1968

=== Tram ===
Balgreen tram stop is located off Balgreen Road, adjacently north of the main Glasgow to Edinburgh railway line.

Preceding station	Edinburgh Trams	Following station
Murrayfield towards Newhaven	Newhaven - Edinburgh Airport	Saughton towards Airport

=== Buses ===
==== Lothian Buses ====
- 12,26,31 (Corstorphine Road)
- 1,2,22,30 (Western Approach Road)
- 38 (Balgreen Road/ Saughtonhall Drive)

==== McGill's Scotland East ====
- 21 and 22 (Corstorphine Road)

== Notable residents ==
- William Stevenson (1772–1829), Scottish nonconformist preacher and writer, farmed in this area.
