= Drumbrae =

Suburb of west Edinburgh, Scotland

Coordinates: 55°57′15″N 3°17′30″W

Drumbrae or Drum Brae is a suburb of west Edinburgh, Scotland generally considered to be part of the neighbouring larger areas of Corstorphine and Clermiston. This is a commuter settlement as many people who live in the area travel to the centre of town to attend work.

The name appears to derive from the Scottish Gaelic Druim Bràigh meaning "the brow of the ridge" and this ridge can still be seen today, and is an extension of Corstorphine Hill.

In the area there is much housing, a primary school, a leisure centre which serves much of the west of Edinburgh, a library/community hub which serves all of the clermiston/drumbrae area and some shopping facilities. A gala is also held once a year at Drumbrae Leisure Centre which brings many people from the local communities of Clermiston, East Craigs Corstorphine and barnton together.

Drumbrae Primary School was closed in June 2010 despite long campaigns by the local community to prevent it from closing. Most of the children were moved to nearby Clermiston and East Craigs Primary Schools. Most of Drum Brae is served by The Royal High School and the area of Drum Brae further west and closer to Corstorphine is served by Craigmount High School. The nearest Roman Catholic schools are Fox Covert R.C. Primary School and St. Augustine's High School.

Drumbrae has become a more popular area to live in recent years as people move away from the centre of Edinburgh.

The area contains a diverse range of socioeconomic backgrounds. From affluent retired households to lower income families but a few streets away. Many are employed, usually in service industries but there is also a high rate of crime in the area.

== Demographics ==
Ethnicity	Drum Brae/Gyle Ward	Edinburgh
White	85.3%	84.9%
Asian	10.1%	8.6%
Black	1.6%	2.1%
Mixed	1.4%	2.5%
Other	1.6%	1.9%
