= Helen Cruickshank =

Scottish poet and suffragette

Helen B. Cruickshank
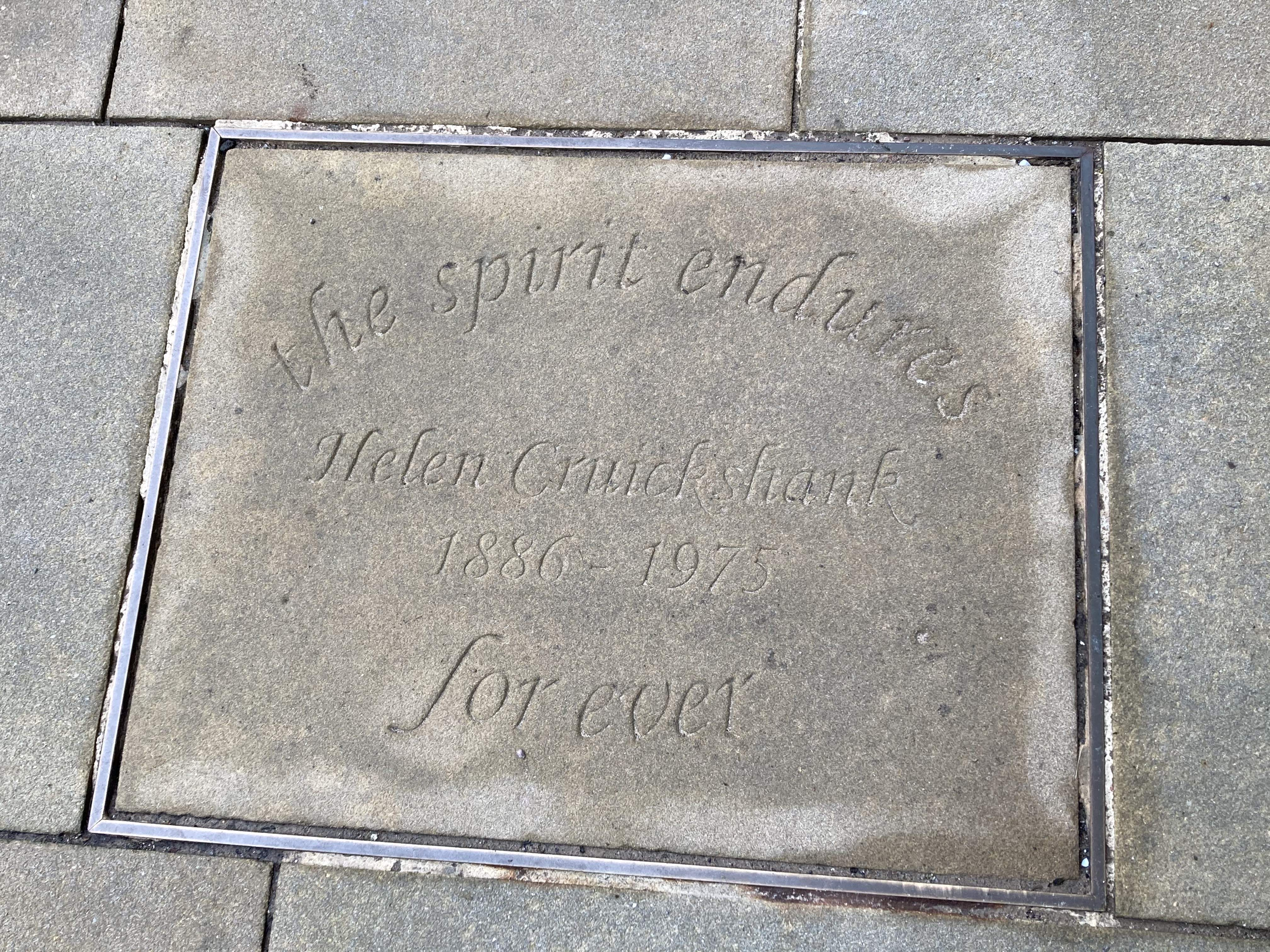
- Born: 15 May 1886; Hillside, Angus, Scotland
- Died: 2 March 1975 (aged 88); Canongate, Edinburgh, Scotland
- Writing career
- Language: Scots, English
- Years active: 1934–1975
- Notable works: Shy Geordie, Sea Buckthorn, Beasties
- Literary movement: Scottish Renaissance, Scots Language

Helen Burness Cruickshank (15 May 1886 – 2 March 1975) was a Scottish poet and suffragette and a focal point of the Scottish Renaissance. Scottish writers associated with the movement met at her home in Corstorphine.

== Early life and education ==
Helen Burness Cruickshank (Nell) was born in Hillside, Montrose, Angus, in one of the staff houses, as her father, George Cruickshank, was a hospital attendant at Sunnyside. Helen was the youngest of three to her father, George (1845-1924), and mother, Sarah Wood (1850-1940), a domestic servant whose father, Colin Gibb Wood, had been Master Plumber, of Montrose.

Helen was educated at the Hillside village school from the age of four, before attending Montrose Academy at the age of ten with her two older brothers. Every year the family summer holiday was spent in cabins in Glenesk, where George taught his children about nature. Helen developed a love of climbing and walking that stayed with her throughout her life, and she made many long trips to the Highlands. The annual family holidays were an inspiration within Cruickshank's poetry, with references to the landscapes and people of Angus appearing in her poetry.

Although Helen achieved awards in every subject at school, her father could not afford to send her to university as her Rector had advised, and Helen left school at the age of fifteen, sitting exams for the Civil Service. Cruickshank's first job was at the Post Office Savings Bank in London from 1903 to 1912. During her time in London she gained an interest in politics and women's suffrage. This interest was sparked by her awareness of the unfair conditions and restricted wages that she saw women had to face in the workplace. Helen joined the Women's Social and Political Union and campaigned for the cause by attending marches, selling Votes for Women in the streets and chalking the pavements.

== Edinburgh ==
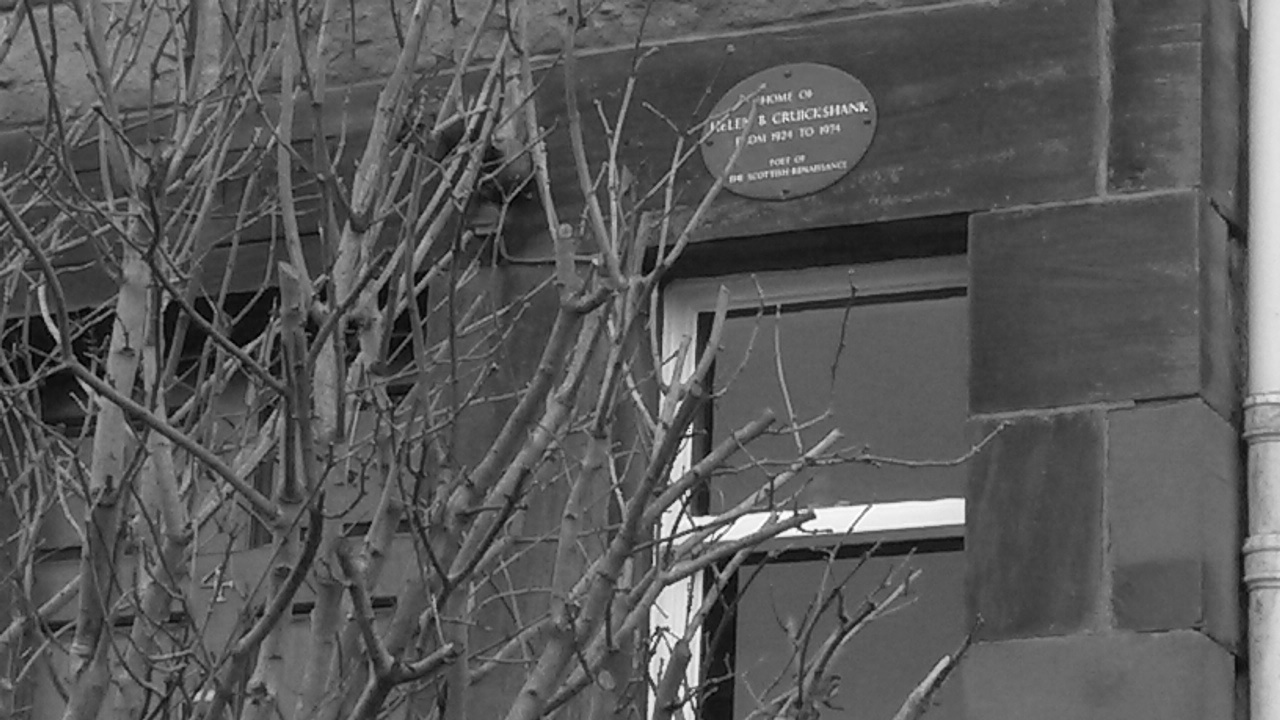
Plaque commemorating Helen Cruickshank, at Hillview Terrace, Corstorphine, Edinburgh

In 1912, Helen was offered a position in Edinburgh for the health insurance part of the government body which she accepted. It was during her move to Edinburgh that she began to write poetry, and it was also around this time that she first fell in love, the heartbreak of the affair spurring her to write. After World War I, Cruickshank began to gain some success in having her poetry published. Reading the magazines and newspapers which were publishing her poems exposed her to other contemporary poetry, and she began to become familiar with the works of Alexander Gray, William Soutar and Marion Angus, and they also became familiar with her work. C.M. Grieve was looking for contributions for a new anthology, Northern Numbers, to which Helen submitted poems, and their correspondence developed into a long-lasting friendship.

Helen began to rent a studio flat in 1921 and liked being a part of the bohemian lifestyle, being so close to the bookshops, and the Pentland Hills were a source of enjoyment for her. However, this freedom did not last as Helen's father died in 1924. It was assumed that Helen, the only daughter, would take over the care of her mother which meant she also had to give up her option to marry, as women that worked in the Civil Service could not continue to work after they were married. Helen gave up her studio flat and bought a semi-detached house on Corstorphine Hill.

== Dinnieduff ==
Helen and her mother moved in to the semi-detached house, Dinnieduff, which became an unofficial meeting place for those involved with Scottish literature at that time. In 1927, Christopher Murray Grieve (Hugh MacDiarmid) became a regular guest at Dinnieduff. He would come to Edinburgh once a month to do business with the Scottish Centre of the PEN Club. With Helen being a founding member and Honorary Secretary, she would eventually take over Hugh's leading role in the PEN Club. Meetings of the PEN Club were often held in Dinnieduff, and Helen often held an open house during the 1920s and 1930s, where those involved in Scottish literature at that time would visit and stay. Notable visitors included the novelist James Leslie Mitchell (Lewis Grassic Gibbon). Her last act for the PEN Club was to raise funds for the International PEN Congress which took place in Scotland in 1934.

== Work ==
During World War I, Helen did weekend and holiday work on farms and in canteens. A summer job in the berry fields near Blairgowrie led to the publication of her first poem, "The Song of the Raspberry Picker", in 1917. Encouraged by this success, she began to write more, experimenting with different forms of verse, but sending only a small proportion of her work to editors. She contributed poems, mainly in her native Angus Scots, to Country Life, the Glasgow Herald and the Scots Magazine. She also published topical and satirical verse under various pseudonyms.

Cruickshank's first collection, Up the Noran Water (1934), published by Methuen, was mostly written in Scots with a few poems being written in English. Helen as a proud Scottish nationalist became a founding member of the Saltire Society in 1936. However, Helen's writing had to be put aside as her work-load became heavier due to World War II. Helen worked on a scheme to evacuate children abroad, and also volunteered for fire-watching duties at night, in addition to her own job and caring for her mother. Helen's mother died in 1940.

After the war, Helen took on the role of an Executive Officer for the Department of Health in Edinburgh, a role she held until her retirement, on medical grounds due to duodenal ulcers, in 1944. After her health had recovered sufficiently, Helen began to entertain once more at Dinnieduff. She was an enthusiastic follower of the Edinburgh International Film Festival since its beginnings in 1947.

Helen's later works include Sea Buckthorn (1954), The Ponnage Pool (1968), Collected Poems (1971) and More Collected Poems (1978). She wrote poetry until the end of her life with her last unfinished poem being about a woman who cannot stop for death as she has too much to do.

== Later life and celebration ==
The BBC commissioned a programme in celebration of her 80th birthday, in 1966, and in 1969 her friends commissioned a bust by Vincent Butler, which is on display at the Scottish National Portrait Gallery. She was awarded an honorary MA by Edinburgh University in 1971. Helen lived in Dinnieduff for over fifty years, living alone after her mother's death in 1940, and even though her health deteriorated she did not leave her home until it was completely necessary to do so when she was 88. Helen moved to Queensberry Lodge on the Canongate in November 1974 and died there on 2 March 1975. She had planned her own cremation, and this was carried out at Warriston in Edinburgh.

Helen's friends laid a plaque at the front door in 1986. Cruickshank recorded her long life and aspects of her times in her autobiography, Octobiography (1987), which was published posthumously. Helen Cruickshank is commemorated in Makars' Court, outside The Writers' Museum, Lawnmarket, Edinburgh. Selections for Makars' Court are made by the Writers' Museum, the Saltire Society and the Scottish Poetry Library.

== See also ==
- List of suffragists and suffragettes
