= Craigievar Estate =

Housing estate near Edinburgh, Scotland

Coordinates: 55°56′48″N 3°18′11″W

Craigievar Estate is a modern housing estate situated in the suburb of East Craigs to the west of Edinburgh, Scotland. The name comes from Craigievar Castle in Aberdeenshire.

== History ==
The estate was built in 1973 by Barratt Homes on agricultural land previously owned by the Scottish Agricultural Science Agency. The estate consists, principally, of two or three bedroomed detached or semi-detached housing.

== Layout ==
The estate's two main access roads, Craigs Drive and Craigs Park, are both cul-de-sacs with housing arranged around landscaped courtyards off to each side. This design creates a safe and open environment typical of planning ideals in the 70's. Thought has been giving to parking provision and most houses have their own garages. There is also ample on-street parking when required.

== Appearance ==
Strict controls on external alterations to property have meant that the estate has retained its original appearance. All the houses have grey brick up to the ground floor ceiling level and above this they are pebbledashed in brilliant white stone.
