= Murrayfield =

Area of Edinburgh, Scotland

Coordinates: 55°56′48.13″N 3°14′44.15″W

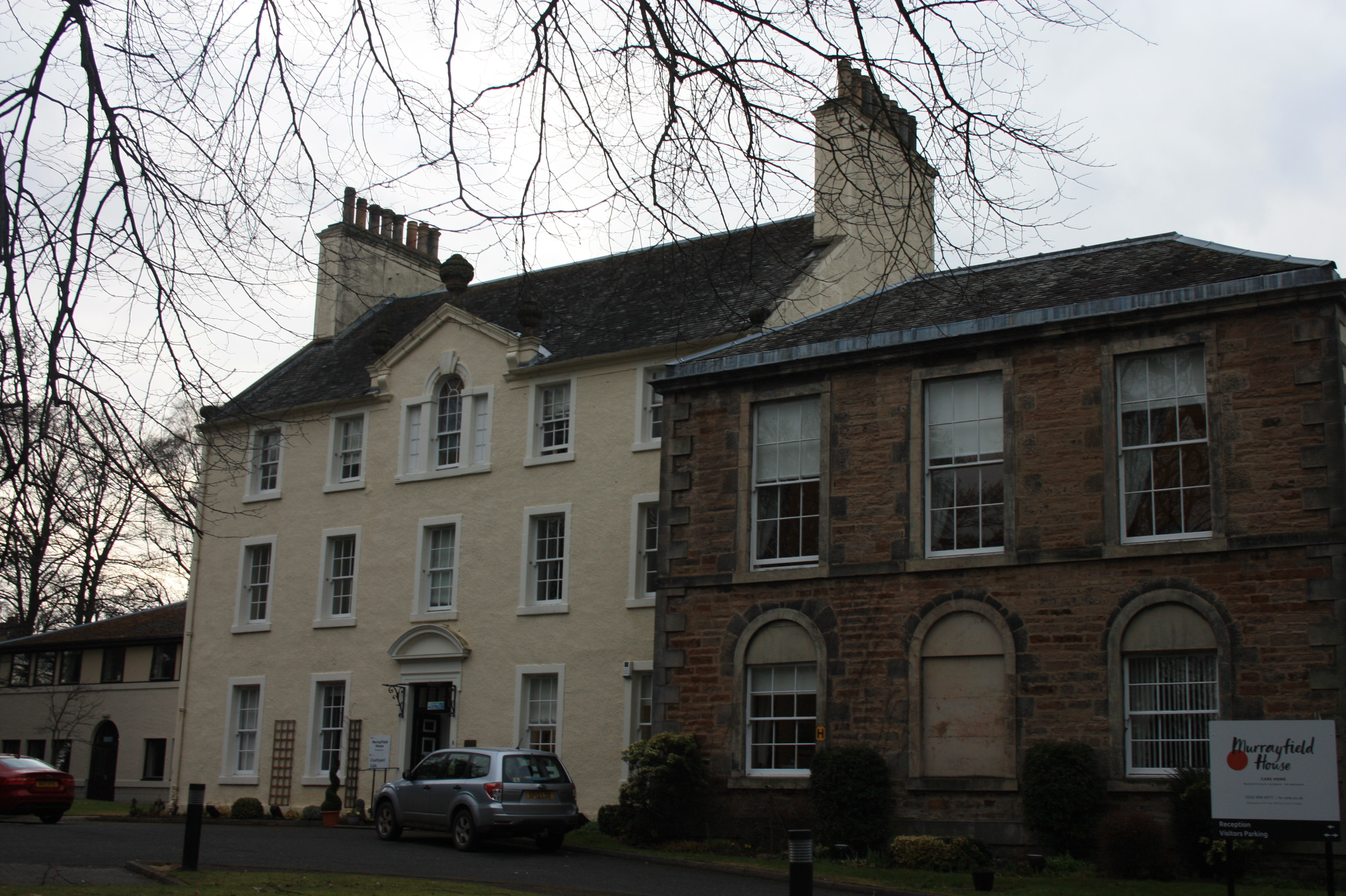
Murrayfield House, Edinburgh

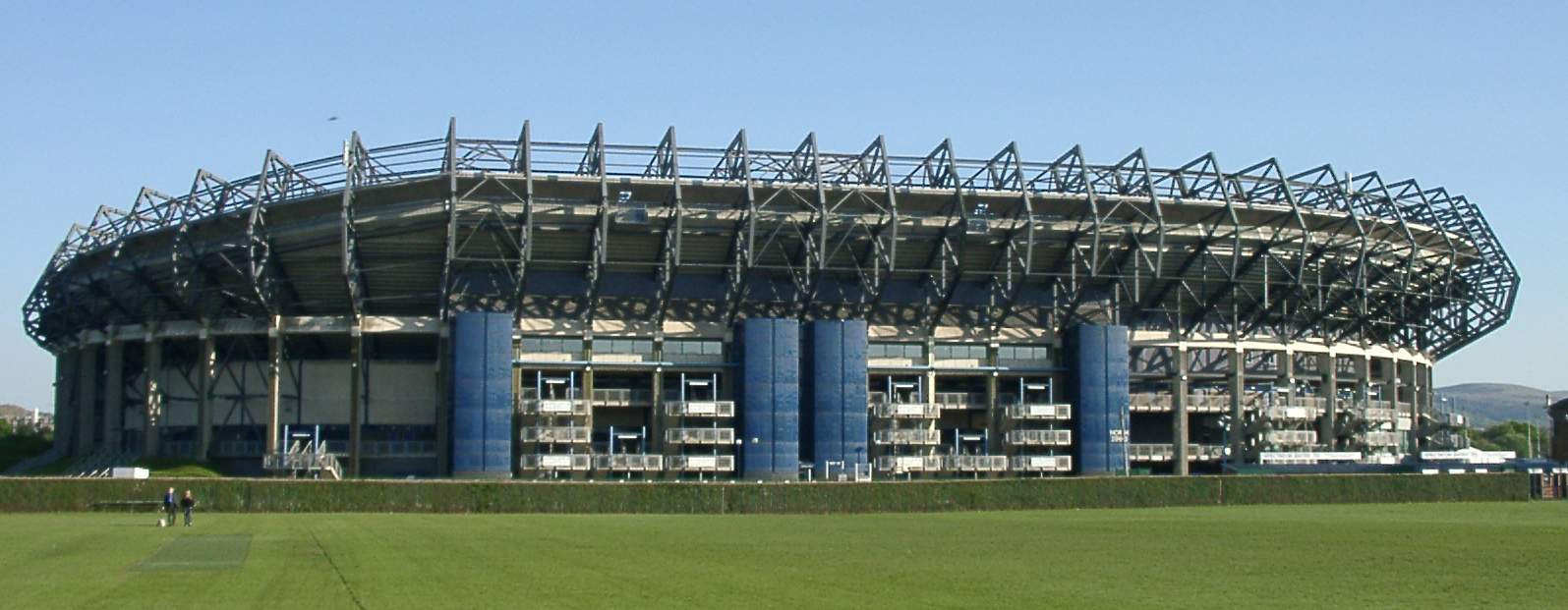
Murrayfield Stadium

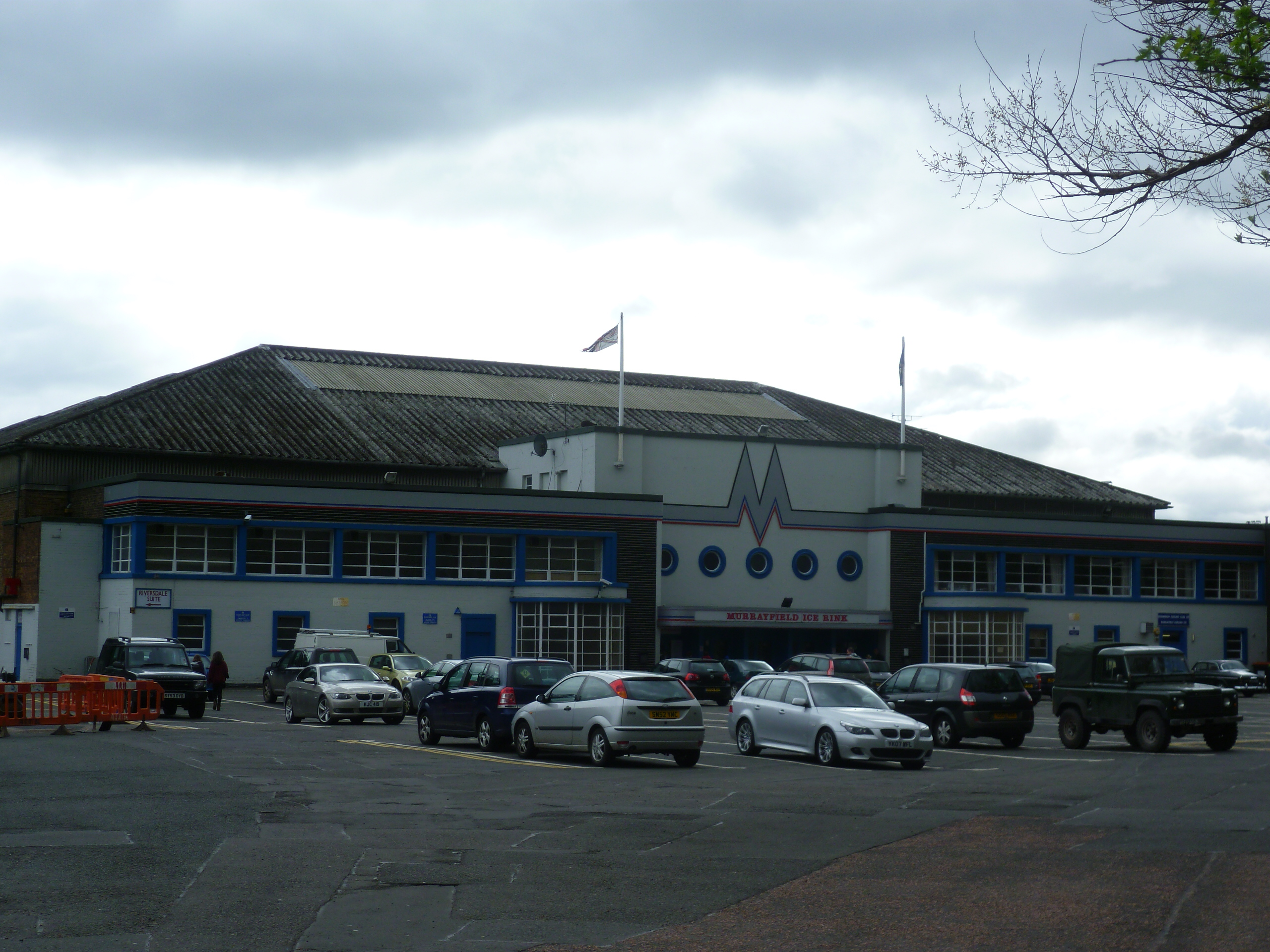
Murrayfield Ice Rink

Murrayfield is an area to the west of Edinburgh city centre in Scotland. It is to the east of Corstorphine and north of Balgreen, Saughtonhall and Roseburn. The A8 road runs east–west through the south of the area. Murrayfield is often considered to include the smaller neighbouring areas of Ravelston (to the north) and Roseburn (to the south).

== History ==
The name comes from the estate of Archibald Murray who built Murrayfield House for himself in 1735 on the south-facing slopes over the area. Archibald Murray bought the land from Nisbet of Dean in 1733; it was previously Nisbet's Park. Alexander Murray, Lord Henderland was born here the year after its construction. In some early records, the name appears as "Murray's Field". Much of the Murrayfield area was semi-rural up until the early 19th century. Among mansion houses built then was Belmont House in 1828 by architect William Playfair for Lord Mackenzie and a large villa known as Rock Villa (later Rockshiel) appears on the Ordnance Survey Map of 1855. The OS map from the 1890s suggests this area remained spacious with scattered individual houses and villas throughout the nineteenth-century.

Easter Belmont Road (a private road), is one of Edinburgh's "Millionaire's Rows" and was home to local businessman David Murray. Aside from sports facilities, there is much residential land use and a private hospital, Spire Murrayfield Hospital, part of the Spire Healthcare group. There are also a few shops, businesses and hotels.

== Sports ==
Murrayfield is the location of Murrayfield Stadium, home to the Scottish national rugby union team and venue for many sporting events. Next to the stadium is Murrayfield Ice Rink, which currently hosts the Edinburgh Capitals ice hockey team and previously played host to the Murrayfield Racers. In the 2006–07 season, Heart of Midlothian played their UEFA Champions League ties at Murrayfield. The stadium is also the venue for large concerts.

The Murrayfield Lawn Tennis Club and Murrayfield Golf Club are situated between Ravelston and Corstorphine Hill. The tennis club was founded in 1904 as The West Edinburgh Tennis and Croquet Club. Murrayfield Golf Club was founded in 1896. Its initial membership was limited to '300 gentlemen and 200 ladies'. The club is notable for having been a mixed club from the start, with female members having the same rights and privileges as the men.. The Ravelston Estate, west of Murrayfield Road, was laid out in 1904.

== Schools ==
The well-known independent schools, St. George's School for Girls and the Merchant Company of Edinburgh's The Mary Erskine School for girls are situated in the Murrayfield area.

The local primary school for most is Roseburn Primary School and Murrayfield is part of the Craigmount High School catchment area. The nearest Roman Catholic schools are Fox Covert R.C. Primary School and St. Augustine's High School.

== Notable residents ==
- Chris Hoy grew up on the boundary of Corstorphine and Murrayfield.
