= Corstorphine railway station =

Former railway station in Edinburgh, Scotland

Corstorphine
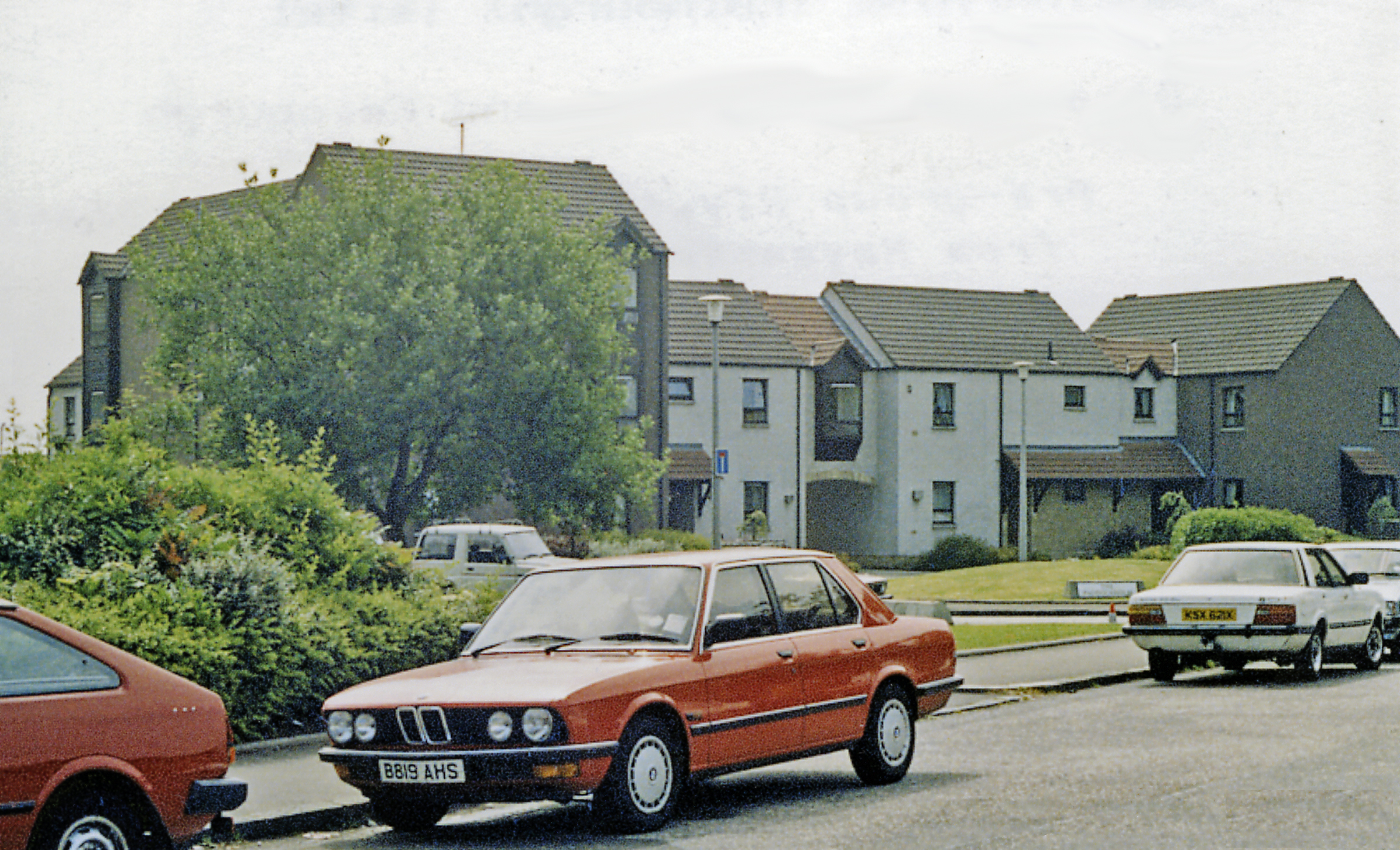
- The site of the former station

General information
- Location: Corstorphine, City of Edinburgh, Scotland
- Coordinates: 55.941309°N 3.278732°W
- Grid reference: NT202727
- Platforms: 2

Other information
- Status: Disused

History
- Original company: North British Railway
- Post-grouping: London and North Eastern Railway

Key dates
- 1 February 1902: Opened
- 1 January 1968: Closed to passengers
- 5 February 1968: Closed to freight
Location
- Location within the City of Edinburgh council area

Corstorphine railway station served the area of Corstorphine, in Edinburgh, Scotland, between 1902 and 1968. It was a terminus of the Edinburgh and Glasgow Railway's Corstorphine branch line.

== History ==
The station was opened by the North British Railway in 1902 and the line passed on to the Scottish Region of British Railways upon nationalisation in 1948. It was closed by the British Railways Board in 1968.

The train journey from Corstorphine to Edinburgh Waverley took 11 minutes.

Preceding station	Historical railways	Following station
Pinkhill	North British Railway; Corstorphine Branch	Terminus

== The site today ==
The site has since been built over by Mactaggart & Mickel, and is now occupied by the Paddockholm housing estate. Station Road nearby is named after its previous incarnation.
