= Ravelston Garden =

Housing estate in Edinburgh, Scotland

Coordinates: 55°57′8.13″N 3°14′48.09″W

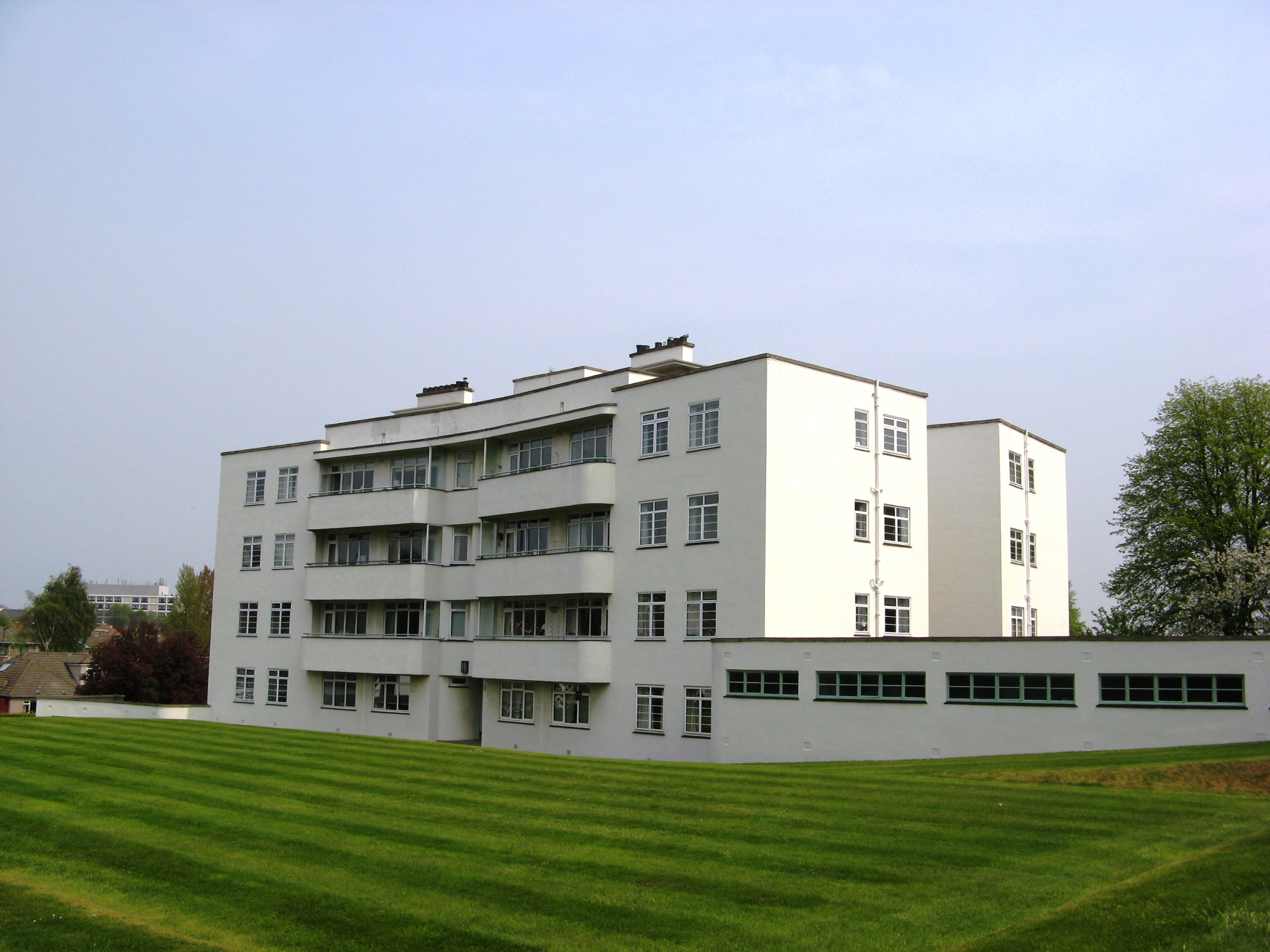
17-32 Ravelston Garden, one of the three identical blocks

Ravelston Garden is a 1930s Art Deco development of residential buildings, between Craigleith Avenue North and South, in the suburb of Ravelston in Edinburgh, the capital of Scotland.

It was designed by Andrew Neil and Robert Hurd, 1935–36, and consists of three white-harled International Style blocks of 4-storey flats. They were originally known as the Jenners flats, who were the managing agents. Ravelston Garden is a category A listed building.

The Edinburgh volume of the Buildings of Scotland series describes them as "Less stylish but more serious-minded". Architectural historian Charles McKean describes them as "Jaunty blocks of international style flats on a butterfly plan, complete with roof gardens, canopies, balconies and curving garages. Particularly clever design incorporating up-to-date labour saving devices. Must have caused quite a stramash amidst the douce, opulent villas of the Dykes..."

The book Above Edinburgh & South East Scotland by Angus and Patricia MacDonald includes a panoramic photograph of the three blocks, and describes them as "Proving that Edinburgh was in touch with the very latest architectural ideas in the 1930s, these flats... were among the first buildings to bring the International Style to the city".

The original fenestration was based on galvanised thin metal of the "Crittall" type, some of which were replaced by modern equivalents during repainting in 1989. Their original colour was green, and they are now white to ensure a common colour amongst the blend of new and original windows. Some 43 of the 48 flats have new windows. Other changes have include novel up and over garage doors, discreetly designed to match their originals.
