= Pinkhill railway station =

Former railway station in Edinburgh, Scotland

Pinkhill
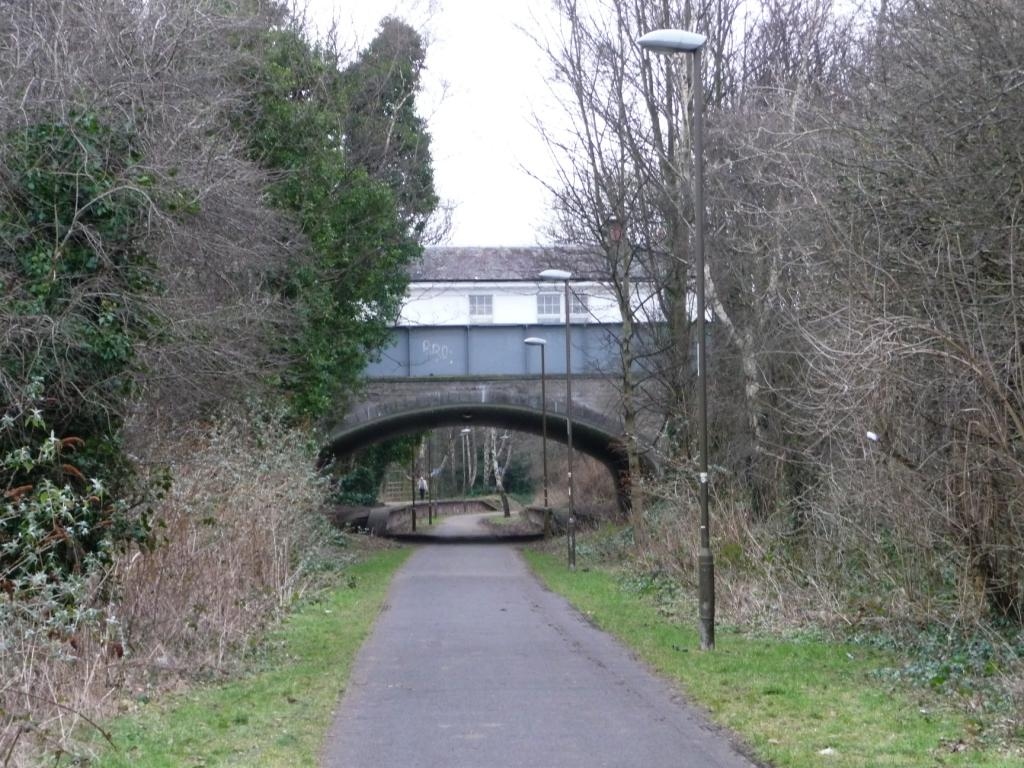
- The site of the former station

General information
- Location: Corstorphine, City of Edinburgh, Scotland
- Coordinates: 55.9417°N 3.2643°W
- Platforms: 2

Other information
- Status: Disused

History
- Original company: North British Railway
- Post-grouping: London and North Eastern Railway

Key dates
- 1 February 1902: Opened
- 1 January 1917: Closed
- 1 February 1919: Reopened
- 1 January 1968: Closed to passengers
- 5 February 1968: Closed to freight
Location
- Location within the City of Edinburgh council area

Pinkhill railway station served the areas of east Corstorphine and Murrayfield, and Edinburgh Zoo, in Edinburgh, Scotland. It was a stop on the Corstorphine Branch of the Edinburgh and Glasgow Railway between 1902 and 1968.

== History ==
The station was opened by the North British Railway and the line passed on to the Scottish Region of British Railways on nationalisation in 1948. It was closed by the British Railways Board in 1968.

== The site today ==
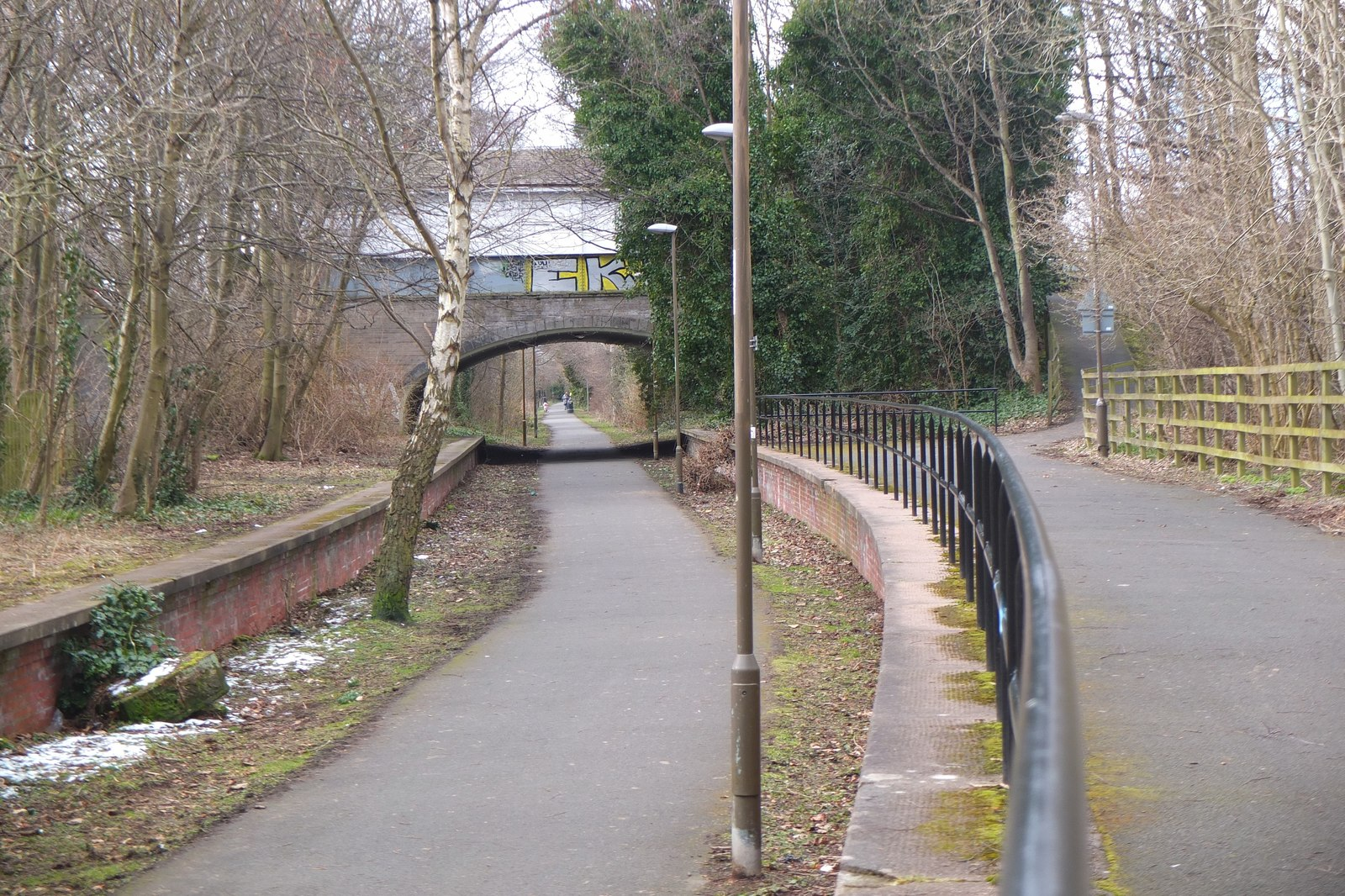
Platforms beside the trackbed, which is now a shared-use path; the former ticket office lies above the bridge

The disused track bed is now a shared-use path, forming part of the City of Edinburgh Council's Quiet Route 9. The platforms and ticket office of the former station remain in place.

Preceding station	Historical railways	Following station
Balgreen Halt	North British Railway; Corstorphine Branch	Corstorphine
