= Balgreen Halt railway station =

Closed railway station in Edinburgh, Scotland

Balgreen Halt
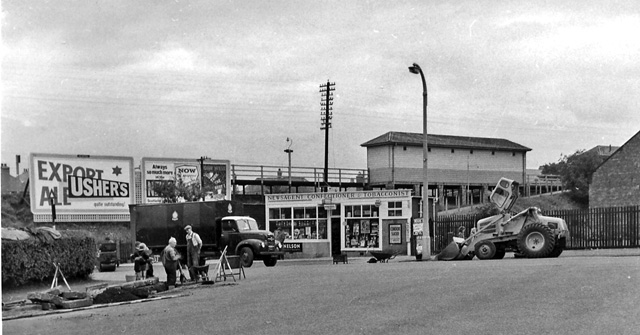
- Balgreen Halt in 1962

General information
- Location: Balgreen, City of Edinburgh; Scotland
- Coordinates: 55.9383°N 3.2520°W
- Platforms: 2

Other information
- Status: Disused

History
- Original company: London and North Eastern Railway
- Post-grouping: London and North Eastern Railway

Key dates
- 29 January 1934: Station opened
- 1 January 1968: Station closed
Location
- Location within the City of Edinburgh council area

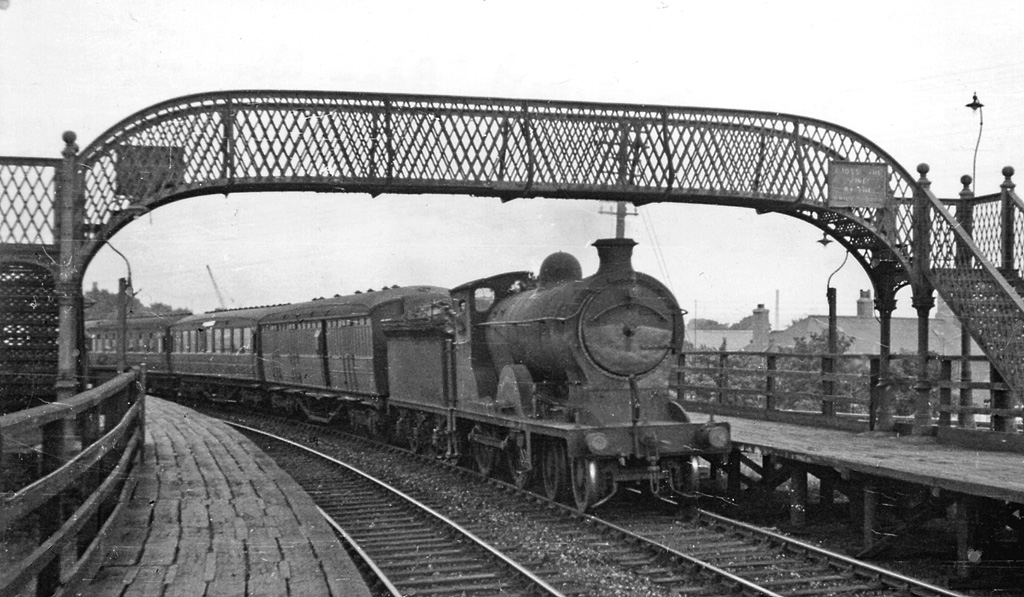
Edinburgh Waverley - Corstorphine branch train in 1948

Balgreen Halt railway station served Balgreen in Edinburgh. Services were provided by trains on the Corstorphine Branch.

In 2014 the Edinburgh Tram system opened a tram stop named "Balgreen" adjacent to the site of the station.

The line that Balgreen Halt was on is now a cycle route and a way to Edinburgh Zoo.

== History ==
The station was opened by the London and North Eastern Railway in 1934. The line passed on to the Scottish Region of British Railways on nationalisation in 1948, to be then closed by the British Railways Board.

Preceding station	Historical railways	Following station
Haymarket	London and North Eastern Railway; Corstorphine Branch	Pinkhill

== The site today ==
The stationmaster's house remains standing, in the site which has been landscaped as part of a garden.
