= Margaret Jarvie =

Scottish swimmer & counsellor (1928–2004)

- Born: 20 January 1928
- Died: 15 April 2004 (aged 76)
- Occupation: Counsellor

Margaret Jarvie (née Bolton; 20 January 1928 – 15 April 2004) was a Scottish swimmer and counsellor. She taught at the University of Edinburgh's Moray House.

== Biography ==
Jarvie was born on 20 January 1928 in Motherwell, to fishmongers Kate Wardrope and John Bolton. She was married to engineer David Gray Jarvie, with whom she had two sons, Colin and Grant. She lived in Corstorphine for a number of years.

== Swimming career ==
Jarvie was one of only two women to win all Scottish swimming championship titles from 50 to 1,000 yards, and swam with Motherwell Ladies' Relay Team. She broke the Scottish breaststroke record in 1945, and held the Scottish senior titles from 1944 to 1948. Along with her husband David Jarvie, she was part of an aquatic team that won 172 Scottish and 47 British records between 1936 and 1960.

== Counselling career ==
Jarvie worked in counselling for more than 40 years. She was on the staff of the University of Edinburgh's Moray House for 24 years where she was a course leader in guidance and counselling and contributed to the establishment of the first award-bearing course on counselling for those working in welfare and healthcare.

In 1955, Jarvie signed up for a counselling training scheme and went on to become the youngest marriage guidance counsellor in Scotland and one of the Scottish Marriage Guidance Council's first educational tutors. She became very interested in how schools handled guidance counselling, and went on to study sociology at the University of Edinburgh because she "thought educators would listen more" if she was a teacher.

Jarvie was also employed by the Bank of Scotland to counsel employees involved in traumatic bank raids.

In his book The Persons in Relation Perspective: In Counselling, Psychotherapy and Community Adult Learning, author Colin Kirkwood acknowledges the influence of Jarvie, in particular through her involvement in the Gorbals Group and the Iona Community, where Jarvie and her husband worked together on the Rowen Engineering project.
