= Clermiston =

Suburb of Edinburgh, Scotland

Coordinates: 55.955117°N 3.288925°W

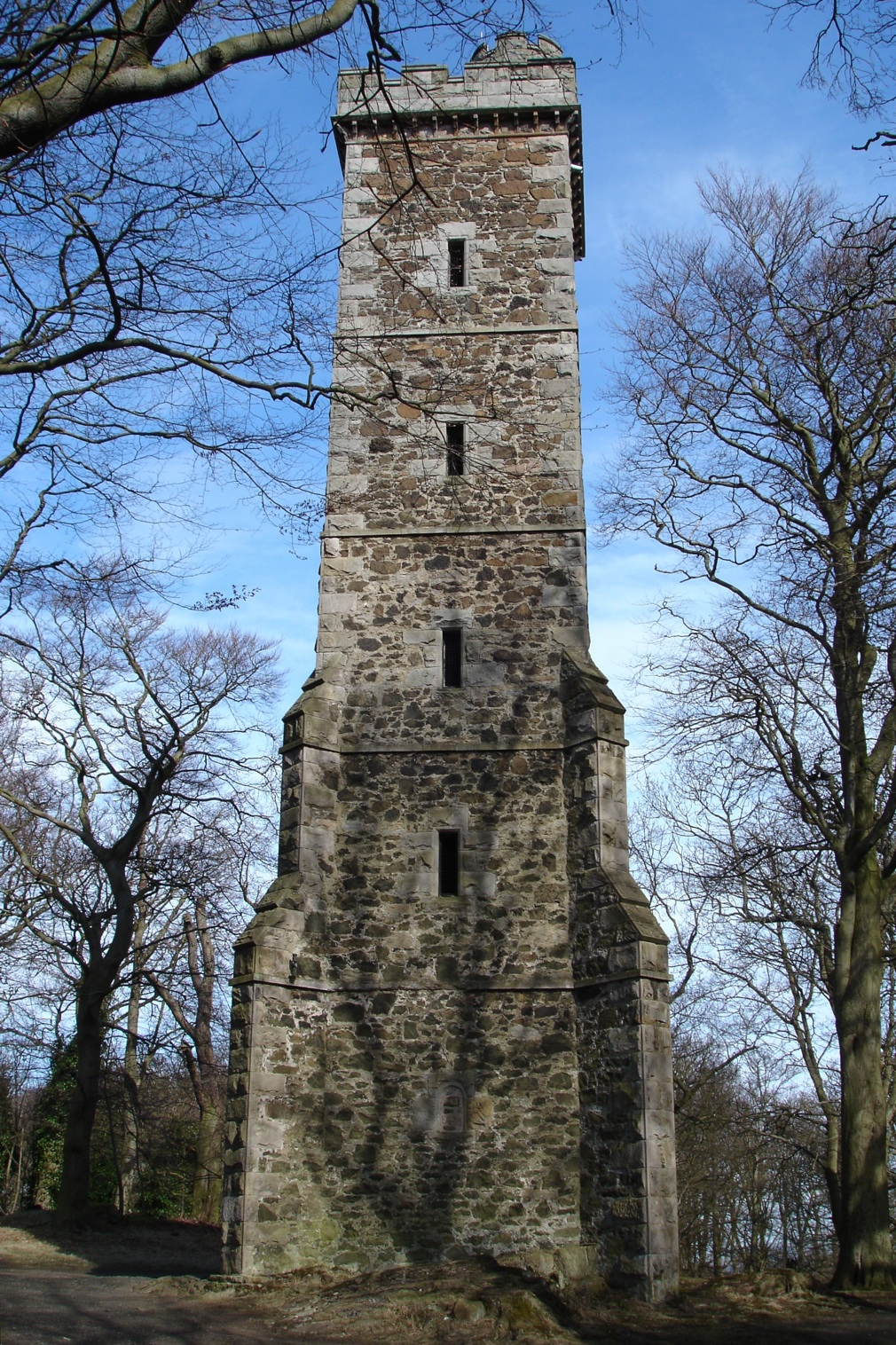
- Clermiston Tower

- Location within the City of Edinburgh council area Location within Scotland
- OS grid reference: NT196743
- Community council: Drum Brae
- Council area: City of Edinburgh
- Lieutenancy area: Edinburgh
- Country: Scotland
- Sovereign state: United Kingdom
- Post town: EDINBURGH
- Postcode district: EH4
- Dialling code: 0131
- Police: Scotland
- Fire: Scottish
- Ambulance: Scottish
- UK Parliament: Edinburgh West
- Scottish Parliament: Edinburgh Western

Clermiston is a suburb of Edinburgh, Scotland, to the west of the city and to the immediate north of Corstorphine, on the western slopes of Corstorphine Hill. Clermiston estate, built from 1954 onwards, was part of a major 1950s house-building programme to tackle overcrowding in Leith and Gorgie. The area is now home to more than 20,000 people, and abuts onto Drumbrae, Clerwood and Corstorphine.

== History ==
The district, known 400 years ago as Glabertoun, became Clermiston in 1730, when a narrow track linked the village of Corstorphine to a small hamlet at Mutton Hole, now known as Davidsons Mains. It was originally used as a hunting ground by the wealthy.

Clermiston Tower was built on the top of the hill in 1872 to mark the centenary of Walter Scott's birth. It was presented to the city in 1932, the anniversary of Scott's death.

Large parts of the lower grounds of Clermiston were owned by the Buttercup Dairy Company until the 1950s, when Edinburgh Corporation bought it for local authority housing.

Part of the land not used by the Corporation to build the Clermiston Estate (the land adjacent to Corstorphine Hill and part of Corstorphine) was sold off to Wimpey Homes who built the Clerwood housing estate on the edge of Corstorphine in 1963; the rest was used for the construction of Queen Margaret College, later Queen Margaret University, which was built next to Clerwood, and Fox Covert Primary School, which serves Clerwood and part of Corstorphine, as well as Fox Covert R.C. Primary School, which serves the Roman Catholic community in the area. Queen Margaret University was finally demolished in July 2009 after the University moved to its new campus in Musselburgh in 2008 leaving the land free for housing developers, Charles Church, to build a new housing estate.

== Schools ==
Clermiston is served by Craigmount High School, and the Royal High School.

The Clermiston area is served by a local primary school , Clermiston Primary School on Parkgrove Place is a feeder school for the Royal High School. The nearest Roman Catholic schools are Fox Covert R.C. Primary School and St. Augustine's High School.

== Infrastructure ==
Vehicular access to Clermiston used to be possible at the Queensferry Road (A90) at Clermiston Drive junction, however this road was closed off and this lower part of Clermiston is now accessible from Queensferry Road at Parkgrove Street.

Clermiston is served by the Lothian Bus numbers: 1, 21, 26, and 200.

== Demographics ==
Ethnicity	Drum Brae/Gyle Ward	Edinburgh
White	85.3%	84.9%
Asian	10.1%	8.6%
Black	1.6%	2.1%
Mixed	1.4%	2.5%
Other	1.6%	1.9%

== Notable residents ==
- The Scars - An Edinburgh post-punk band.
- Walter Scott who held lands in the area, and to whom there is a monument nearby on Corstorphine Hill.
