= SASA (Scottish Government) =

Coordinates: 55.9237°N 3.3428°W

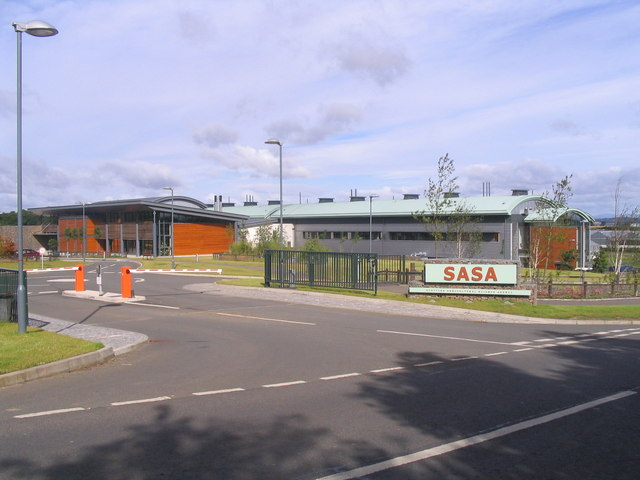
- Newly built headquarters in 2007

Agency overview
- Formed: 1992
- Jurisdiction: Scottish Government
- Parent department: Director-General Net Zero

SASA (formerly the Scottish Agricultural Science Agency) is a division of the Scottish Government Agriculture and Rural Economy Directorate. It provides scientific advice and support on a range of agricultural and environmental topics to the Scottish Government.

SASA is based at Gogarbank Farm on the western edge of the City of Edinburgh, where its premises contain a laboratory, a glasshouse and an experimental farm facility. Over 100 scientists and other staff members work at SASA, all of whom are civil servants.

== History ==
From 1925 to 2006, the Agency and its precursors were based at East Craigs in Edinburgh. The Agency was first formed by the then Board of Agriculture for Scotland. The origins of SASA can be traced back to the opening of a full-time seed testing station in 1914 at 21 Duke Street (now part of Dublin Street), Edinburgh. Following the introduction of the Testing of Seeds Order 1917, the unit moved to larger premises nearby at 7 Albany Street in 1918.

In May 1925, the Seed Testing Station moved to new purpose built laboratories at East Craigs along with the Plant registration Station. The Board of Agriculture changed its name to the Department of Agriculture and Fisheries (DAFS) in 1960, and in 1961 the operations at East Craigs were renamed Agricultural Scientific Services of DAFS.

In 1992, the Scottish Agricultural Science Agency (SASA) was formed as an executive agency taking on the role of Agricultural Scientific Services for the then Scottish Office. Following devolution in Scotland, the Agency became a part of the Environment and Rural Affairs Department.

In 2000, SASA began developing plans to relocate from East Craigs due to the age of the facilities and the demands put upon them by new technologies, a suitable site was eventually identified on the Agency's own Gogarbank Farm. SASA finally relocated to purpose built facilities there in 2006.

In April 2008, the agency became a division within the Agriculture Food and Rural Communities Directorate of the Scottish Government. It was known as Science and Advice for Scottish Agriculture until March 2019, when it was decided that the name should be changed to the commonly used acronym SASA. The work conducted by the organisation and its facilities remained the same.

== Role ==
The role of SASA is as follows:

- Ensuring the quality of seeds and tubers for planting, and new crop varieties;
- Keeping field and horticultural crops free of damaging diseases;
- Keeping serious pests of plants out of Scotland;
- Acting as the Scottish Government's Inspectorate of genetically modified crops;
- Developing new and more sensitive diagnostic tests for pests and diseases;
- Preserving and maintaining a wide range of historic, heritage and other varieties of potatoes, cereals, peas and brassicas;
- Monitoring the pesticide load in the national diet, and the pattern of use of pesticides in Scotland;
- Protecting wildlife against deliberate or accidental poisoning;
- Understanding the ecology of vertebrate species that conflict with agriculture and providing advice on their management (e.g. rabbits, foxes, geese).
