= Corstorphine =

Village and area of Edinburgh, Scotland

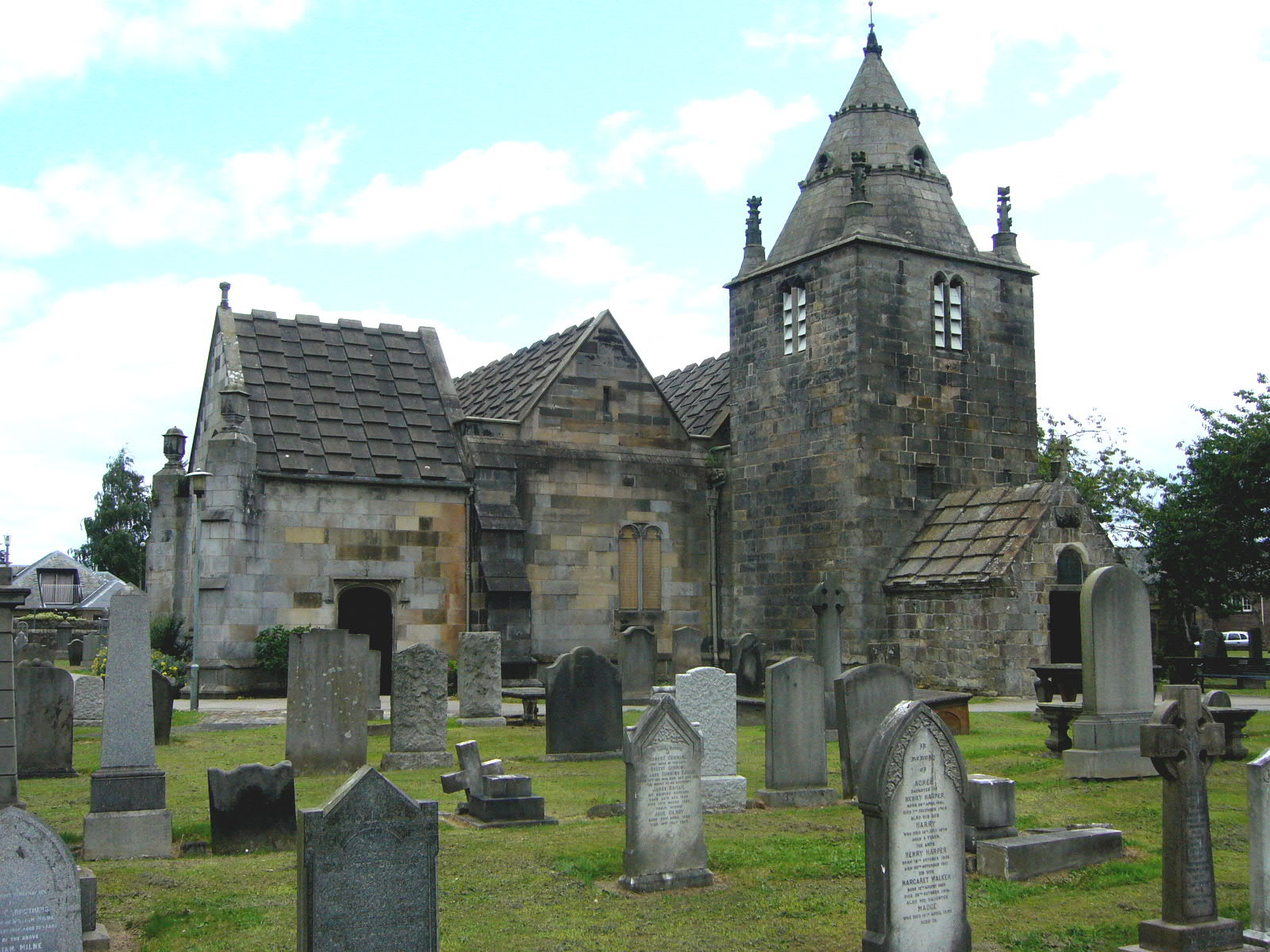
- Corstorphine Old Parish Church

- Location within the City of Edinburgh council area Location within Scotland
  - London: 410 miles
- Council area: City of Edinburgh
- Country: Scotland
- Sovereign state: United Kingdom
- Post town: EDINBURGH
- Postcode district: EH12
- Dialling code: 0131
- Police: Scotland
- Fire: Scottish
- Ambulance: Scottish
- UK Parliament: Edinburgh West
- Scottish Parliament: Edinburgh Western

Corstorphine (Scottish Gaelic: Crois Thoirfinn) (/kərˈstɔːrfɪn/ kər-STOR-fin) is an area of the Scottish capital city of Edinburgh. Formerly a separate village and parish to the west of Edinburgh, it is now a suburb of the city, having been formally incorporated into it in 1920.

Corstorphine has a high street with many independent small shops, although a number have closed in recent years since the opening of several retail parks to the west of Edinburgh, especially the Gyle Centre. St John's Road, the main street, suffers from bad congestion as the busy road forms part of the A8 main road between Edinburgh and Glasgow. The actual "High Street" itself is no longer the main street, an anomaly shared with central Edinburgh.

Famous residents have included pioneer scientist Chrystal Macmillan, Scottish Renaissance author Helen Cruickshank, and Olympic cyclist Sir Chris Hoy. Corstorphine is also featured prominently in Robert Louis Stevenson's 1886 novel Kidnapped and mentioned in Danny Boyle's 1996 film Trainspotting.

== Etymology ==
The earliest known form of the name is Crostorfin, recorded in 1128. This possibly means 'Torfin's crossing': in ancient times, much of the land in the area consisted of small lochs and marshes, with Corstorphine situated at an ideal crossing point. The identity of Torfin is not certainly known, but he was likely a local baron who commanded a stronghold by the crossing. The name is a Gaelicised version of the Norse name Thorfinnr, and was popular in Scotland around 1000.

A popular legend, now widely discredited, states that a 'cross of fine gold' was presented to the church by a Norman baron, and thus the village came to be known as croix d'or fine.

== History ==
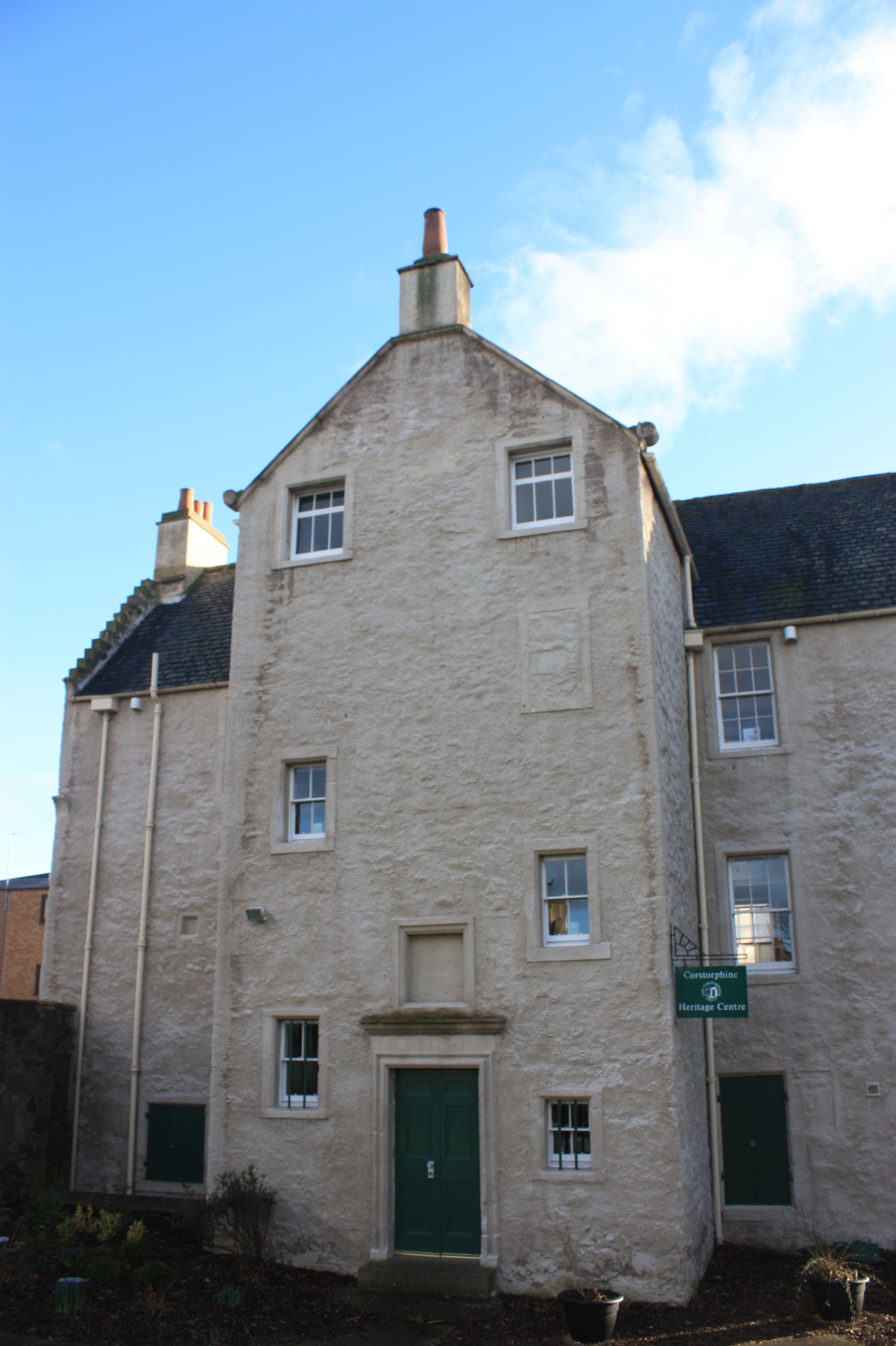
Dower House in Old Corstorphine

Old Corstorphine stood on a piece of dry land, between two lochs, the Gogar Loch and Corstorphine Loch, though both have now been drained.

The first recorded proprietors of Corstorphine were David le Mareschall, in the reign of Alexander II, and Thomas le Mareschall and William de la Roche, whose names occur in Ragman Rolls of 1296. The estate remained in the possession of the families of Thomas le Mareschall and William de la Roche until the reign of David II, when it was forfeited by David le Mareschall and given by the King to Malcolm Ramsay. It was next held by William More of Abercorne, who left it to his brother, Gilchrist More, who sold it to Adam Forester.

An important family in the area were the Lords Forrester, whose name has been given to several streets and whose large house can still be seen on Corstorphine High Street. Their main home, Corstorphine Castle, a 14th-century stronghold, was in ruins by the end of the 18th century and does not exist today. The only remnant of the castle is the 16th-century dovecote (Note: at 55°56′20.52″N 3°16′53.35″W, NT2004972517) which stands alongside Dovecot Road and a commemoration in a street name, Castle Avenue.

The lands and Barony of Corstorphine have long been associated with the Forrester family. The first firm link with Corstorphine comes with Adam Forrester, a wealthy burgess of Edinburgh in the 1360s when he began to acquire land in the vicinity.

Between 1374 and 1377 King Robert II confirmed Adam Forrester in the lands of the Lordship of Corstorphine, which had previously been owned by William More of Abercorn. Forrester founded a chapel dedicated to St. John the Baptist, connected to the parish church of Corstorphine.

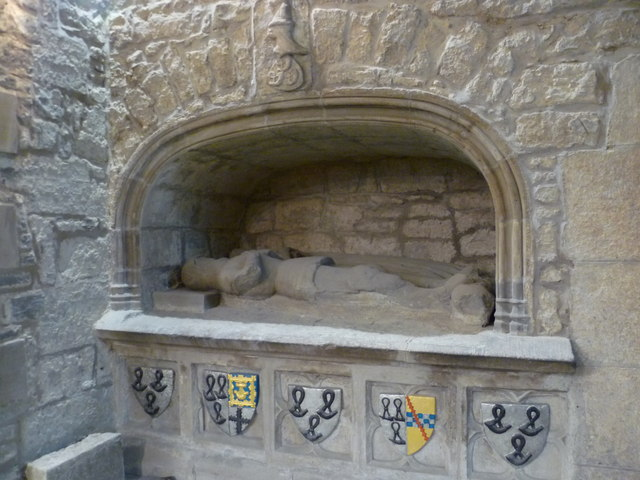
Sir John Forrester's tomb (spouse hidden) in Corstorphine Old Parish Church

Sir John Forrester, who succeeded his father upon his death, was granted various lands, mostly in West Lothian, in 1426 which were united into the barony of Liberton. In Perth on 4 February 1431 James I confirmed him in the house and lands of Corstorphine, which would be thereafter known as the Barony of Corstorphine. He likely founded the Corstorphine Collegiate Church in 1429, which forms part of today's parish kirk. Sir John is thought to have died in 1448 and was buried in Corstorphine Kirk, where recumbent effigies of him and one of his wives survive. He had four children: John, Henry, Elizabeth, and Janet.

The title then fell to his eldest son John, who is believed to have been more of a soldier than a civil servant. In 1443 he was with the Earl of Douglas when he destroyed Barnton Castle, a stronghold of the Crichtons. As a direct consequence, Forrester's house at Corstorphine was razed. He died in 1454 and was buried in Corstorphine Kirk, where his tomb can still be seen.

=== 16th century ===
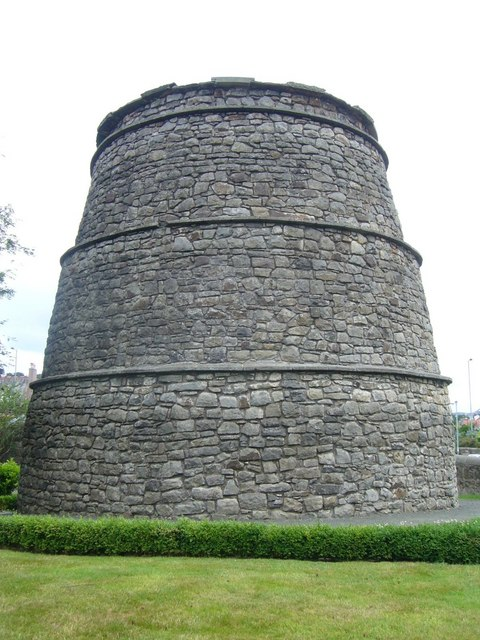
Corstorphine doocot, built in the 16th century to serve Corstorphine Castle, which has since been demolished.

William Dunbar mentions a poet, Roull of Corstorphin, in his Lament for the Makaris, c.1505. Little else is known of the poet Roull, though one poem by him may be extant. Stewart Conn, Edinburgh's first appointed Makar, has celebrated Roull's memory in his volume Ghosts at Cockcrow.

On 5 February 1556, James Forrester of Corstorphine (son of the previously mentioned James Forrester), husband of Janet Lauder, was confirmed by Mary, Queen of Scots, in the Barony of Corstorphine. In 1577 Sir James presented the parish kirk with a bell for its steeple. This bell still survives, although it was renewed in 1728.

On 22 October 1599, Henry Forrester of Corstorphine sold various lands within the parishes of Corstorphine and St Cuthbert's. Henry died sometime around 1615 and his eldest son George became laird. James VI had already confirmed George Forrester, son and heir apparent of Henry Forrester of Corstorphine, and his wife Christine Livingstone in various properties in the barony of Corstorphine, on 15 November 1607.

At Holyrood House on 30 July 1618, King James confirmed Sir George Forrester of Corstorphine in the lands and barony of Corstorphine. On 22 July 1633 he was created Lord Forrester of Corstorphine by Charles I. Lord Forrester had no sons, so resigned most of his properties, including Corstorphine, in favour of James Baillie.

During the mid-17th century, the family seems to have experienced some financial problems which resulted in lands being temporarily out of their control. On 3 August 1663, the lands and Barony of Corstorphine, except for the castle of Corstorphine and the town of Corstorphine, were granted to Sir John Gilmour. Oliver Cromwell had granted Laurence Scott of Bavelaw and his wife Katherine Binning, the lands, Lordship and Barony of Corstorphine, tower, manor-place, mills, mill-lands, parsonage etc., in lieu of the money due by James, Lord Forrester, to Beatrix Ramsay in Corstorphine who had assigned the debt to the said Laurence Scott in 1654. On 5 August 1664, the lands, Lordship and Barony of Corstorphine formerly belonging to James, Lord Forrester, and his brother german William Baillie which had been taken in lieu of debt, were granted to Florentius Gardner, baillie of Grangepans.

On 10 May 1666, land was similarly granted to John Boyd, merchant burgess of Edinburgh. The Forresters soon reacquired much of their lands around Corstorphine.

James Baillie's first wife Johanna died early. He then married Janet Ruthven, daughter of the Earl of Forth. This latest Lord Forrester was a man of dubious morals and seduced his niece, the wife of an Edinburgh burgess James Nimmo. She, however, later quarrelled with Forrester and stabbed him to death in his garden at Corstorphine on 26 August 1679. Mrs Nimmo was later executed at the Cross of Edinburgh for the murder. The titles then fell to William, the son of his brother William Baillie and his wife Lillias, daughter of the first Lord Forrester.

In 1698, the estate of Corstorphine was sold to Hugh Wallace of Ingliston, a Writer to the Signet. In 1713, he sold it to Sir James Dick of Prestonfield, in whose family it remained until 1869. The Dicks were a prominent family of lawyers and merchants in Edinburgh. Sir James Dick (1643–1728) was a merchant and baillie of Edinburgh and also served as Dean of Guild and later as Lord Provost.

=== 18th century and later ===
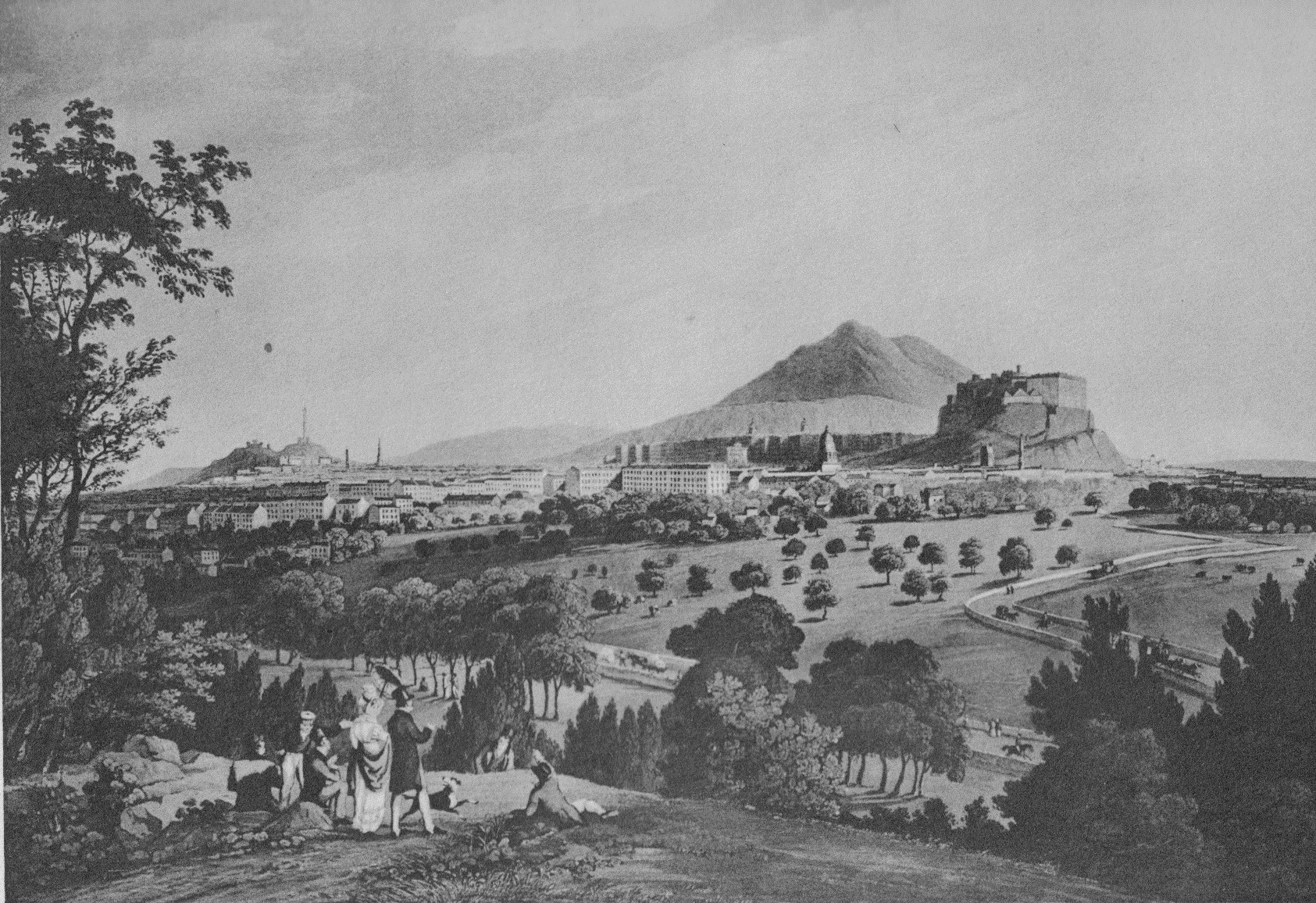
View of Edinburgh from Corstorphine Hill, 1824

The Register of the Great Seal of Scotland records the transfer of the lands and Barony of Corstorphine to Sir James Dick on 2 June 1713.

Unlike some other areas of Edinburgh, Corstorphine escaped widespread industrialisation in the 19th century. It only started to be absorbed into the Edinburgh urban area in the mid-20th century. But even before then, it had started to transform into a middle-class dormitory area for Edinburgh workers. By the late 20th century, Corstorphine had an ageing demographic. In 1961, Queen Margaret College (now QMU) obtained land up on the edge of Corstorphine next to Clermiston, and set up a campus there. This was closed in 2007, when they moved all their facilities out to Musselburgh.

Corstorphine became part of Edinburgh on 1 November 1920.

== Landmarks, attractions, and facilities ==
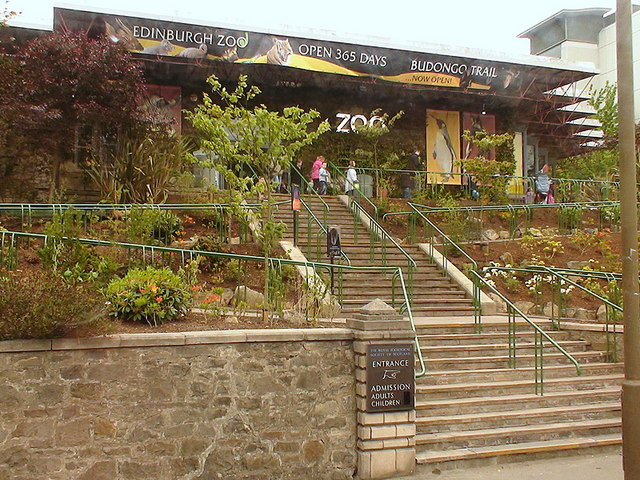
Edinburgh Zoo

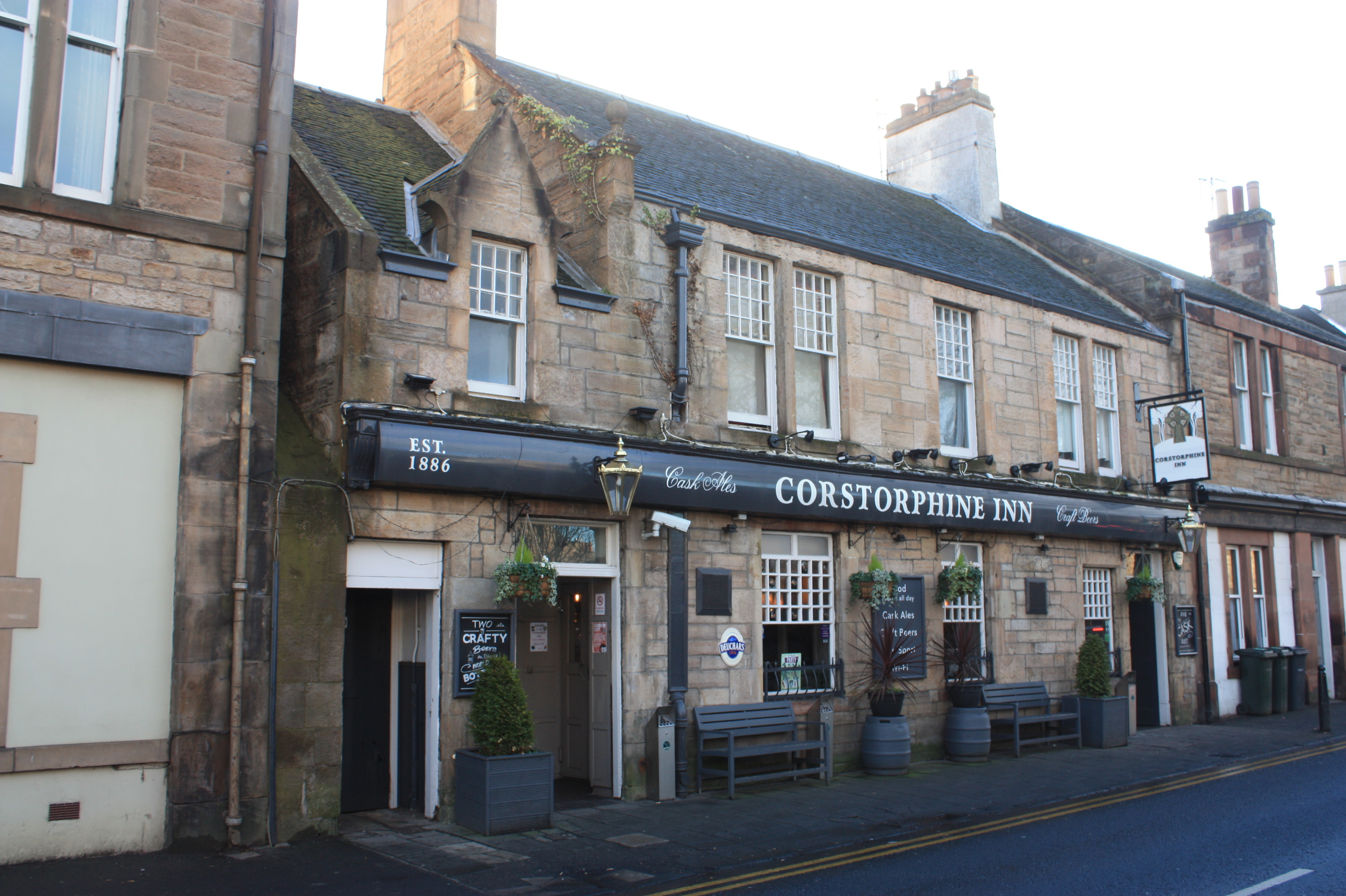
Corstorphine Inn

Edinburgh Zoo is situated to the south-east of Corstorphine, and is the area's largest and most popular tourist attraction.

Corstorphine has one of Scotland's best-preserved late medieval parish churches, Corstorphine Old Parish Church, with a short tower and spire and several well-preserved stone effigies of the local noble family, the Forresters of Corstorphine. The church dates primarily to the late 15th century and was built on the site of an earlier 12th century church. The church of St Thomas houses an evangelical Episcopalian congregation.

Close to Corstorphine Old Parish Church on Kirk Loan is Corstorphine public library. The current library is housed in a building dating to 1927, designed by Ebenezer James MacRae. Before moving to the current building, the library was housed in an adjacent building containing the library and Corstophine public hall. However, the library was only added to the building in 1904 following funding by Andrew Carnegie. The earlier building dates to 1891 and was also used as a community center, it is now a private residence.

Corstorphine Hill is one of the so-called "Seven Hills of Edinburgh". Queen Margaret University's main campus was located there from 1970 until 2007, when the university moved to Musselburgh.

== Sport ==
There are two rugby clubs based in Corstorphine: Corstorphine Cougars RFC and Forrester RFC. Because of its proximity to Murrayfield Stadium, Corstorphine picks up much of the passing trade from rugby internationals and this helps support the local hotels and pubs.

The local football club is Beechwood FC who play at Gyle Park pitches and at Tall Oaks. These are two of a number of football grounds in the area. There are also two tennis centres at St.Margaret's Park and on Belgrave Road.

RH Corstorphine Cricket Club play home games at the Royal High School in Davidson's Mains.

There are also two golf clubs based at Carrick Knowe nearby, and also another over on the other side of Corstorphine Hill. Corstorphine Golf Club (now defunct) was founded in 1902. The club and course disappeared in the late 1920s. The area once occupied by the course now forms part of Edinburgh Zoo.

Corstorphine has its own tennis club, which is over a hundred years old., and there are additional tennis facilities at the David Lloyd Centre in Gyle Park, and at the nearby Murrayfield Tennis Club.

== Education ==
In the area is Corstorphine Primary School, a state school catering for children between typically 5–12 years of age. There are also several other state primary schools near Corstorphine: Carrick Knowe Primary School, East Craigs Primary School, Fox Covert Primary School, Fox Covert Roman Catholic Primary School and Gylemuir Primary School. The state secondary school that serves the area is Craigmount High School, which is situated between Corstorphine and East Craigs, and the nearest Roman Catholic secondary school is St. Augustine's, which shares a campus with Forrester High School.

== Transport ==
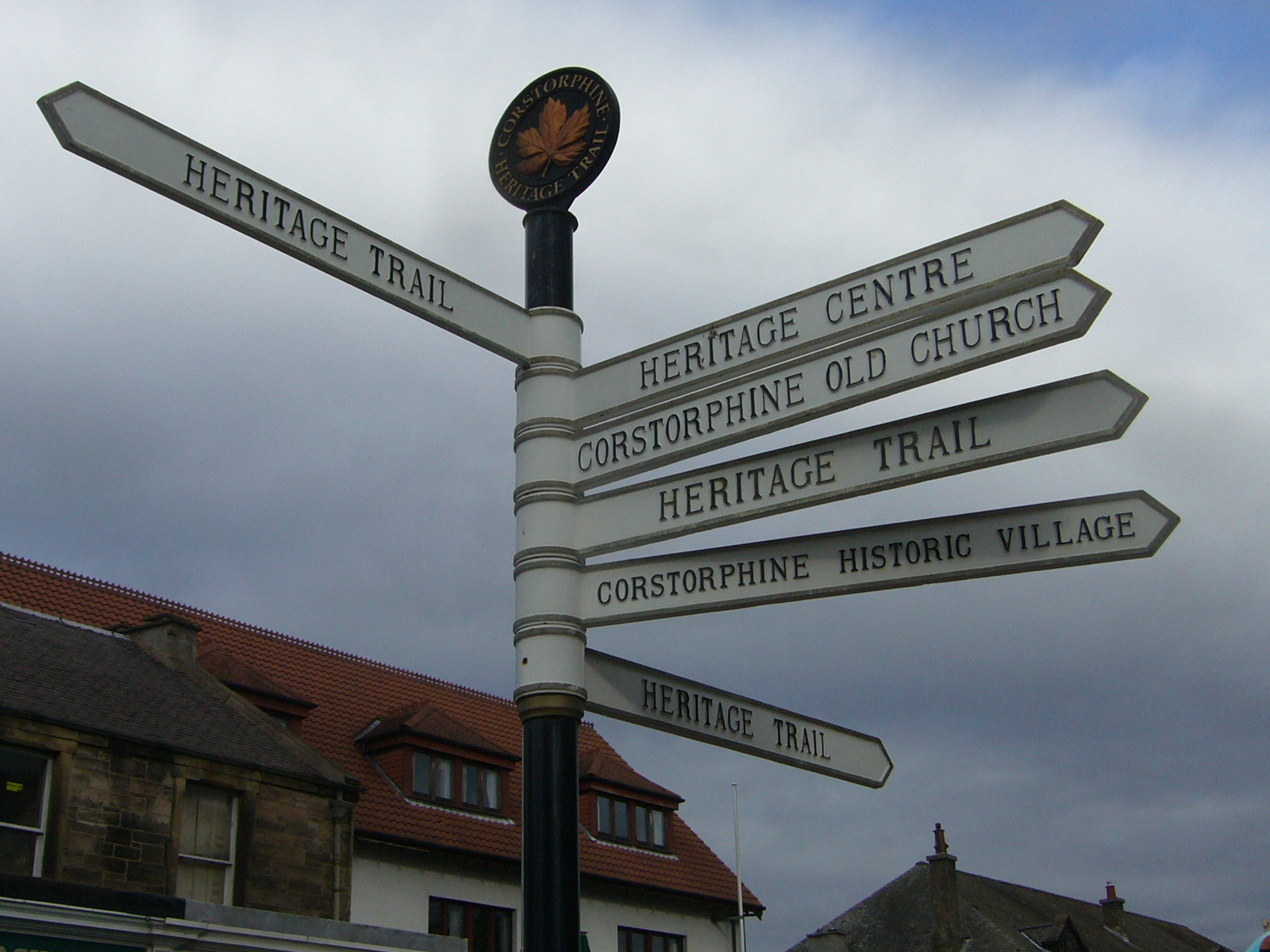
Signpost in Corstorphine

Corstorphine contains one of the busiest routes out to the west and Glasgow Road's name reflects its former connection to Scotland's largest city. St John's Road, the main street in Corstorphine rather than the High Street, has been consistently rated as among the most polluted in Scotland. Lothian buses has introduced low-emission buses to try and deal with this problem. Large sections of this main road have been turned into bus lanes where the road is wide enough. Cycling routes run mainly from east to west as the topography is dominated by the ridge of Corstorphine Hill

The area is served by a number of buses operated by Lothian Buses including route numbers 1, 12, 17, 21, 26 and 31; X18 and X19 branded as Lothian Country; N18 (weekends only) and N26 night buses; and Airlink 100. Other bus operators serving Corstorphine include McGill's and Scottish Citylink.

The Corstorphine and Pinkhill railway stations were closed to passenger service in 1968, but some of the track bed remains and is used as a footpath and part of the cycle network. The nearest extant railway stations are at Edinburgh Gateway and South Gyle, and slightly further away, Haymarket.

== Notable people ==
- Sir Alexander Asher, advocate and politician, lived at Beechwood House and is buried in Corstorphine churchyard
- Sir Robert Tuite Boothby, banker, lived at Beechwood House after Asher and is also buried in Corstorphine churchyard
- Helen Cruickshank, poet
- Chris Hoy, cyclist and Olympian, grew up in Corstorphine.
- Margaret Jarvie, swimmer and counsellor. Lived in Corstorphine for a number of years.
- Thomas Nicol Johnston FRSE, zoologist
- Jimmy Leadbetter, the only Scottish footballer to win English Third, Second and First Division championship medals with the same club.
- John Linn, Royal Engineer
- Chrystal Macmillan, pioneer scientist and suffragist
- William Morrison, author and pioneering Esperantist
- Roull of Corstorphine, mediaeval poet
- Henry Stevenson, international cricketer and rugby player, died in Corstorphine.
- David Thompson (1588–1628) first governor of Massachusetts under the 1622 Council for New England grant and founder of New Hampshire under the 1622 Piscataqua 6,000 acre land grant.
- Clive Woodward, English rugby player, went to primary school in Corstorphine.

== See also ==
- History of Edinburgh Zoo
- Scotus Academy

== Bibliography ==
- Bell, Raymond MacKean (2017). Literary Corstorphine: A reader's guide to West Edinburgh. Edinburgh: Leamington Books. ISBN 9-780244644406.
- Cant, Michael, Villages of Edinburgh volumes 1 & 2, John Donald Publishers Ltd., Edinburgh, 1986–1987. ISBN 0-85976-131-2 & ISBN 0-85976-186-X
- Cosh, Mary Edinburgh the Golden Age (2003), Birlinn, Edinburgh
- Cowper, Alexandra Stewart Corstorphine Village, 1891 (1973), Edinburgh University Extra-Mural Association
- Dey, W. G. (1990). Corstorphine: A Pictorial History of a Midlothian Village. Mainstream Publishing. ISBN 1-85158-366-1.
- Grant, James, Old and new Edinburgh' volumes 1–3 (or 1–6, edition dependent), Cassell, 1880s (published as a periodical): Online edition
- Harris, Stuart (1996). The Place Names of Edinburgh. Edinburgh: Gordon Wright Publishing. p. 144. ISBN 0-903065-83-5.
- Sherman, Robin Old Murrayfield and Corstorphine (2003)
