= Corstorphine Hill =

Hill in Edinburgh, Scotland

Coordinates: 55°57′6″N 3°16′18″W

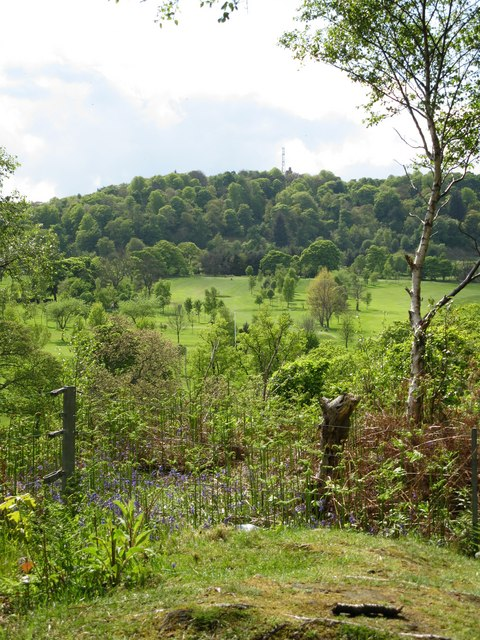
- Looking across Ravelston Golf Course to Corstorphine Hill

Highest point
- Elevation: 161 m (528 ft)
- Prominence: 117 m (384 ft)
- Isolation: 0.23 km (0.14 mi)

Dimensions
- Length: 2.4 km (1.5 mi) N-S

Geography
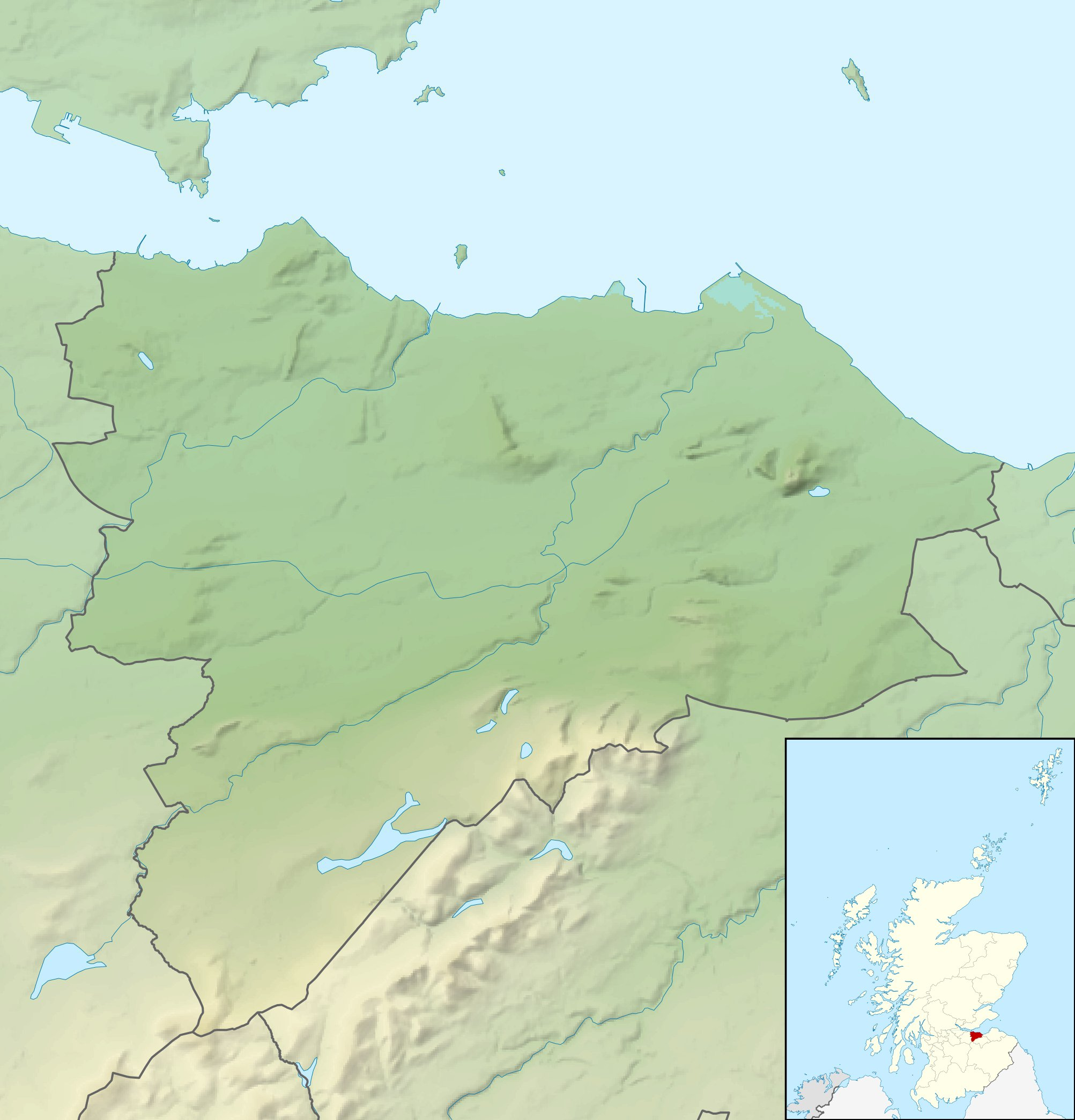
- Location within Edinburgh Location within the City of Edinburgh council area Location within Scotland
- Location: Edinburgh, Scotland
- OS grid: NT206738
- Topo map: Ordnance Survey Landranger 66

Climbing
- Easiest route: Easy walk on well-defined paths from Ravelston Dykes Road or Clermiston Road

Corstorphine Hill is a low ridge-shaped hill rising above the western suburbs of Edinburgh, Scotland. Although there has been residential and commercial development on its lower slopes, especially in the south and west, most of the hill is occupied by a local nature reserve, consisting of extensive broadleaf woodland, accessible to the public.

The hill, which is composed largely of dolerite, was formed by the west-to-east movement of glaciers during the Pleistocene period. There is evidence of prehistoric settlement. Today the hill is popular with walkers, dog-walkers and joggers. Among its interesting features are a 19th-century tower, a walled garden and a Cold War bunker.

== Location ==
Corstorphine Hill is located approximately 5 kilometres (3.1 miles) west of Edinburgh's city centre. It is surrounded by residential suburbs, in particular by Barnton and Davidson's Mains to the north, Blackhall and Murrayfield to the east, Clerwood and Clermiston to the west, and Corstorphine to the south.

== Physical features ==
The hill is a prominent feature of Edinburgh's skyline. It appears as a long, low, L-shaped ridge, extending about 2.4 kilometres (1.5 miles) in length from north to south and rising to 161 metres (528 feet). The upper slopes, which are heavily wooded, form a local nature reserve (LNR), managed by the City of Edinburgh Forestry and Natural Heritage Service and the Friends of Corstorphine Hill. It is the largest urban woodland in the city.

By contrast, parts of the lower slopes have been built on, particularly in the south and west. The area between Kaimes Road and Clermiston Road is largely residential, consisting mainly of bungalows and small villas. Other buildings on the hill include Fox Covert Primary School, two large hotels (Capital Moat House and Holiday Inn), St Andrew's Clermiston Church, St Anne's Parish Church and the Spire Murrayfield Hospital. Some 82 acres (33 ha) of the southern slopes are occupied by Edinburgh Zoo.

Corstorphine Hill is one of Edinburgh's traditional "Seven Hills", an allusion to the Seven Hills of Rome. It is the fourth highest of the seven.

=== Woodlands ===
The LNR consists of three broad types of woodland. There are about 15 acres (6.1 ha) of oak and birch woods into which sycamore and beech have been introduced. Some 21 acres (8.5 ha) of mixed broadleaf woodland are present, composed primarily of native ash, oak and elm into which sycamore, lime, Norway maple, horse chestnut, sweet chestnut, beech and various conifers have been introduced. And there are about 11 acres (4.5 ha) of more formal policy woodland originally associated with Hillwood House and Calderwood House, and composed of a variety of native and non-native broadleaf and coniferous species.

=== Archaeology ===
There is evidence of prehistoric settlement on Corstorphine Hill. At the end of the 19th century, quarrying operations uncovered shells, bones, stone tools and pottery, while hammer stones, cup-marked stones, part of a quern and other pottery fragments from a kitchen midden have also been discovered. There are eleven cup-marks on the western slopes, nine in the shape of a pentagon with two in the centre. These were probably part of a sacred Neolithic or Bronze Age site, but their precise purpose is unknown.

=== Geology ===
Corstorphine Hill is made up primarily of dolerite, a hard, crystalline igneous rock, sitting above softer, more erodible sedimentary rocks. The hill was shaped by west-to-east flowing glaciers during the Pleistocene period, forming steep cliffs of doleritic bedrock in the west and gentle slopes of boulder clay in the east. The top surface of the dolerite shows grooves cut by stones scraping the surface, these being set in the base of the ice and acting like sandpaper.

=== Other features ===
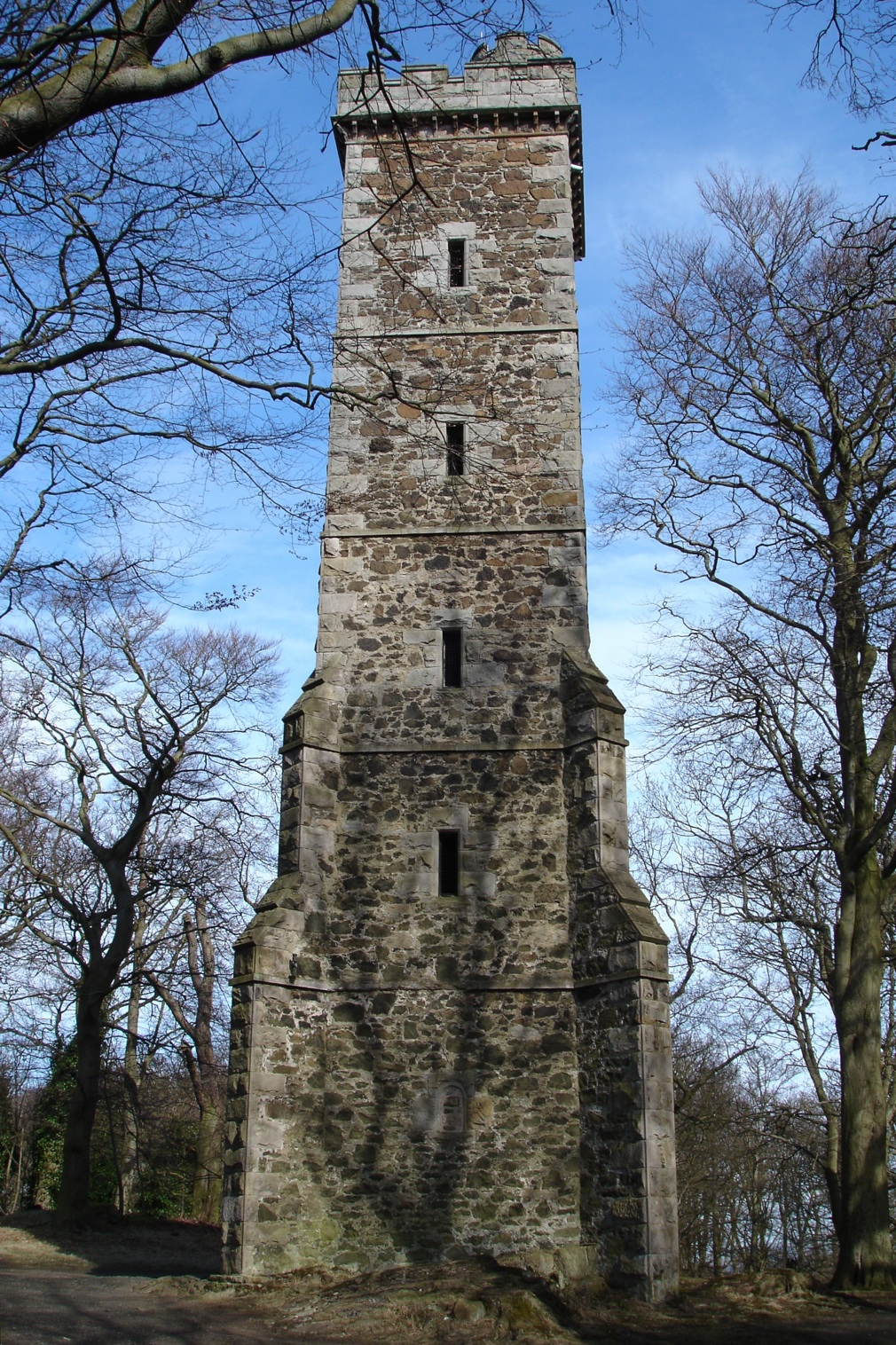
Corstorphine Hill Tower

- Corstorphine Hill Tower (also known as Clermiston Tower or the Scott Tower). Situated close to the hill's summit, it was built in 1871 by William Macfie of Clermiston to commemorate the centenary of the birth of Sir Walter Scott. It was gifted to the city in 1932 to mark the centenary of Scott's death. It is a five-storey high tower, on a square plan, with castellation at the top.
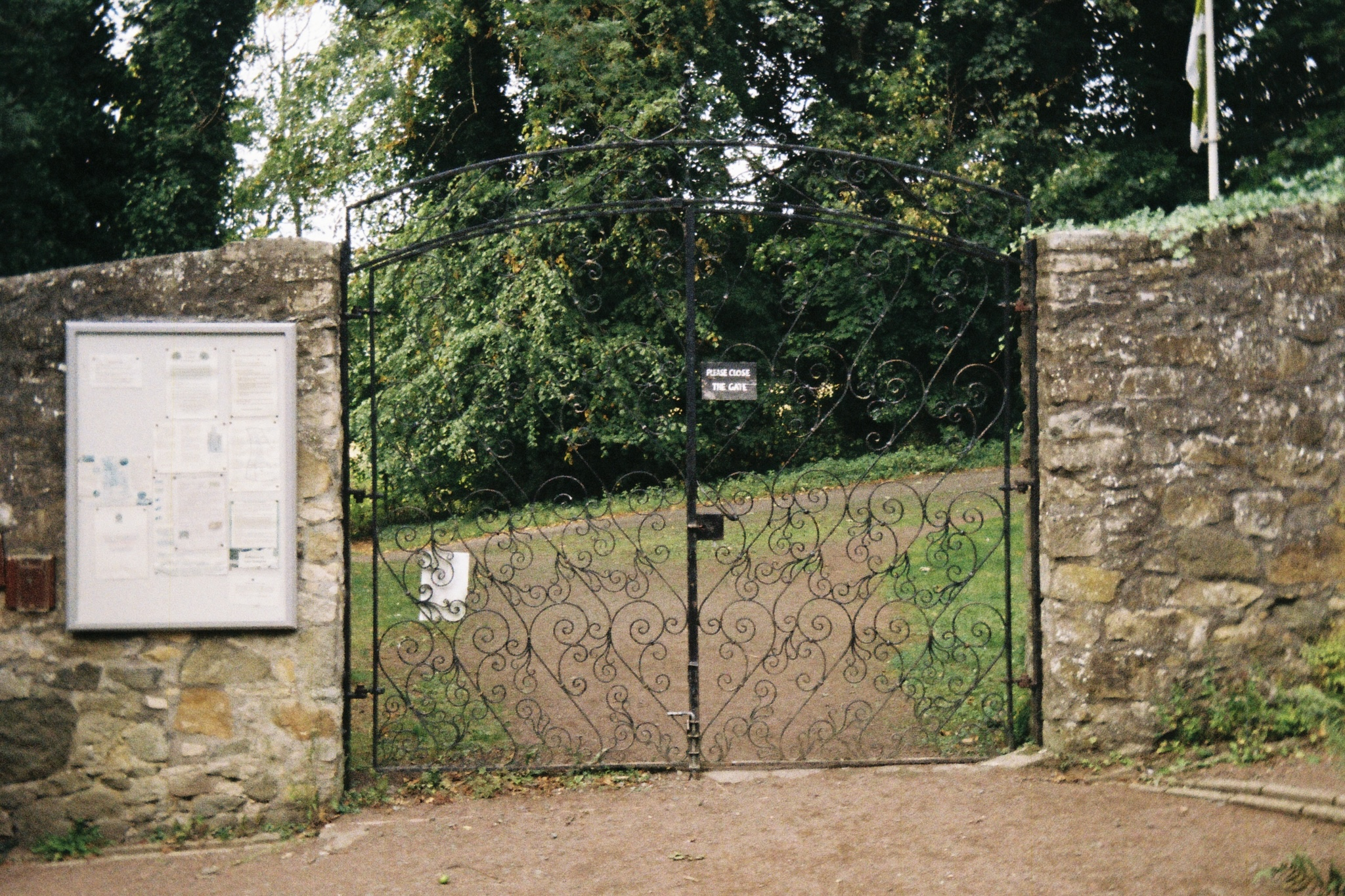
- Gate of Corstorphine Hill’s walled garden (photograph taken from inside the garden)
  A 1.2-acre (0.49 ha) walled garden on the hill's western slopes. Originally belonging to Hillwood House, it has been in council ownership since 1927. It had become disused and overgrown, but has now been restored by volunteers from the Friends of Corstorphine Hill. In 2001 and 2004, it was featured on BBC Scotland's The Beechgrove Garden.
- Corstorphine Hill Cemetery. Situated on Drum Brae, on the western side of the hill, it was established in 1928, and came into council ownership in 1994. The cemetery has 35 graves of Commonwealth servicemen and 165 graves of Polish servicemen from World War II, as two foreign service war graves and 39 postwar service burials.
- Barnton Quarry. This former stone quarry closed in 1914. It now contains a three-floor deep underground bunker which was developed in the 1950s as a regional command centre in the event of nuclear war. The site was decommissioned in 1983, after which it was badly vandalised and damaged by fire. Since 2011, volunteers have been refurbishing the bunker in preparation for its opening to visitors. In June 2021 Historic Environment Scotland designated the site as Category-A listed.
- Two prominent radio masts near the summit.

== Recreational uses ==
The LNR is a popular location for informal recreation such as walking, dog-walking, jogging, bird-watching and sledging. The extensive tree cover limits the view from most of the hill, but the summit offers extensive views in all directions. Since 2010, the hill has been a recipient of a Green Flag Award in recognition of its quality as an open space.

The hill hosts a permanent orienteering course, established by the Edinburgh Southern Orienteering Club. The 215 kilometres (133.6 miles) John Muir Way long-distance path crosses the hill on the section of its route between South Queensferry and Edinburgh. The hill is also on the route of the Seven Hills of Edinburgh race, an annual running race which takes in the summits of the city's traditional "seven hills". The race, which was established in 1980, is usually held on a Sunday in June.

There are two golf courses on the eastern side of the hill: Ravelston Golf Course in Ravelston Dykes Road; and Murrayfield Golf Course in Murrayfield Road.

Corstorphine Hill, seen in the south from a residential street in the Balgreen area

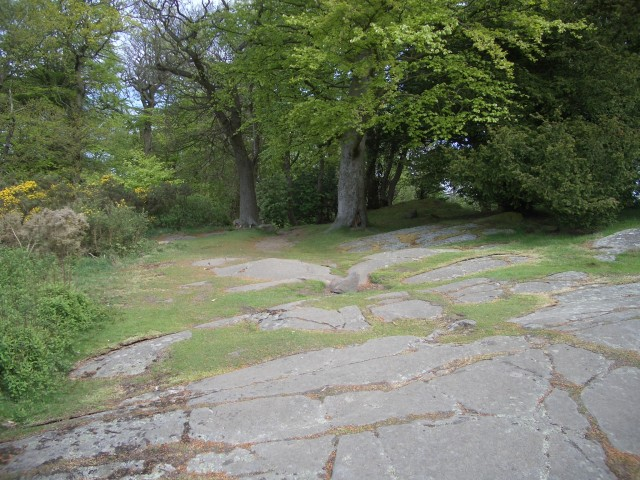
Glacial pavements on Corstorphine Hill, showing striation

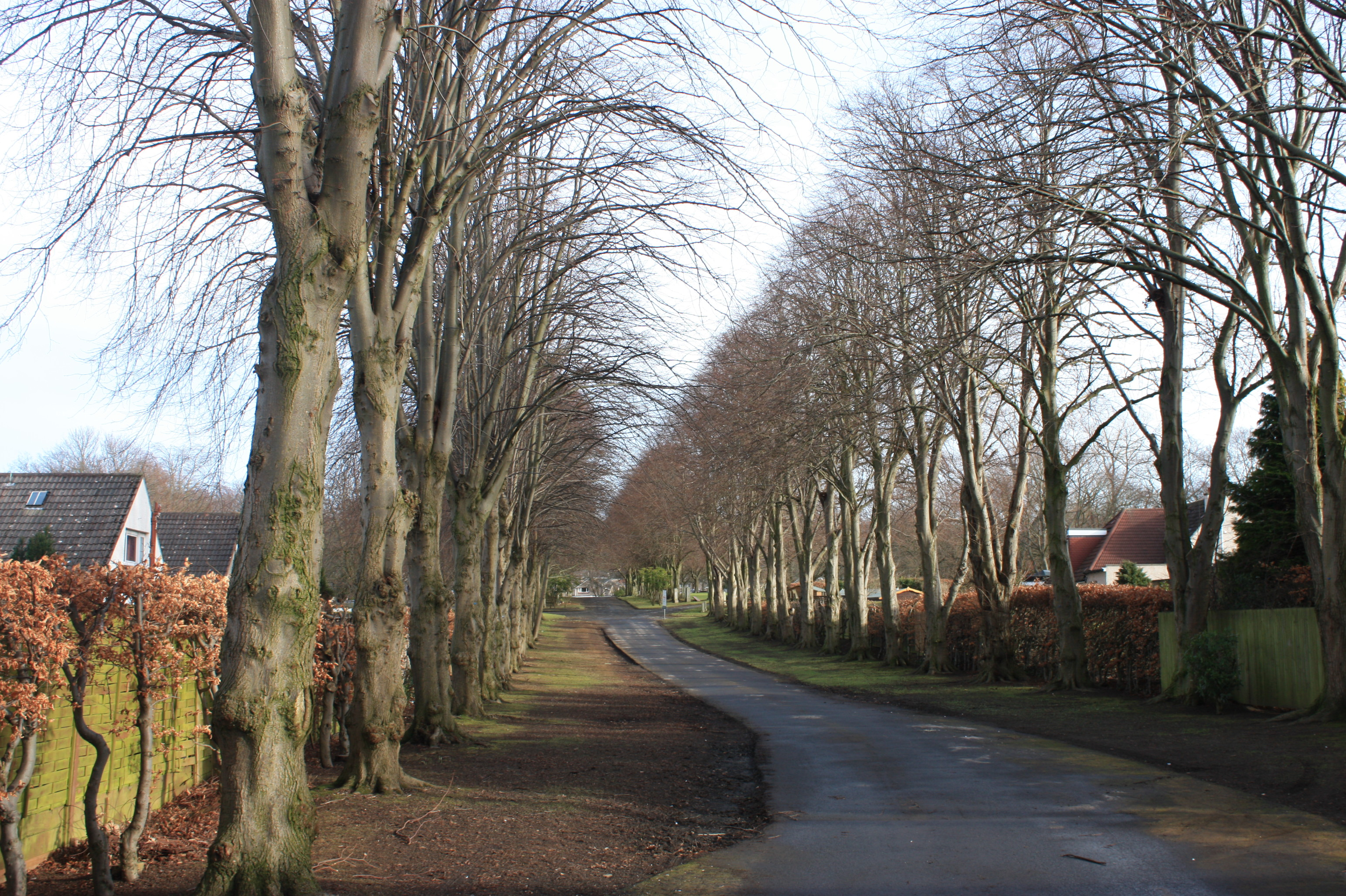
The avenue of trees leading to Corstorphine Hill Cemetery

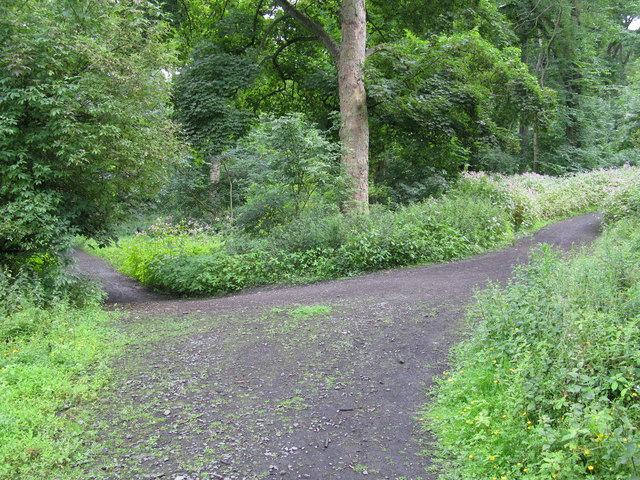

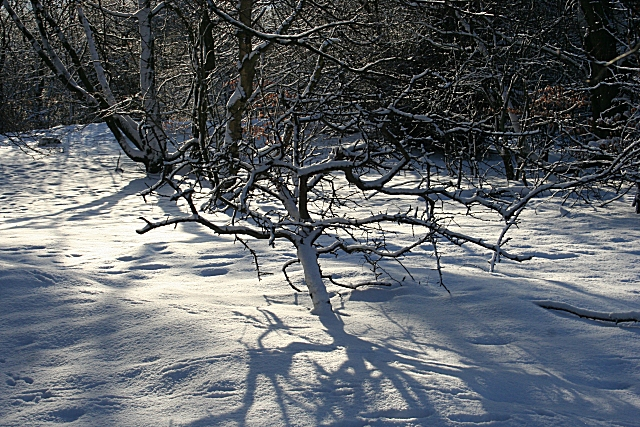
In winter.

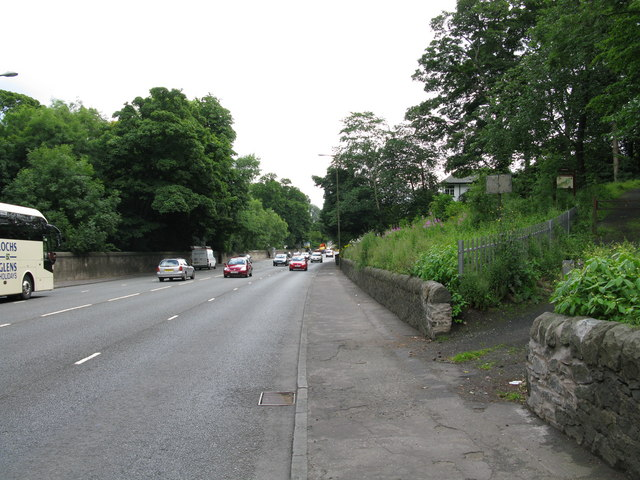
Entrance from Queensferry Road

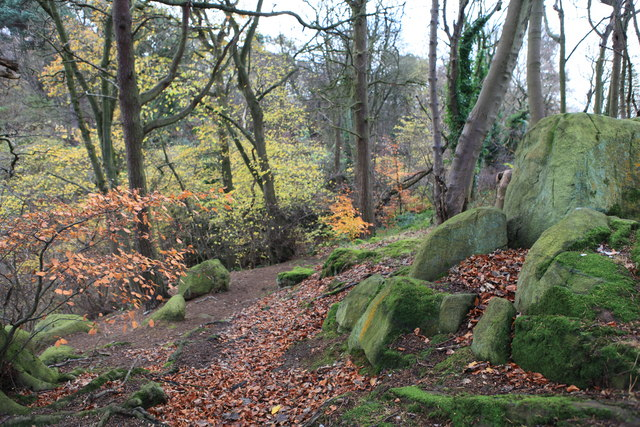
Woodland and rock formations
