= Sighthill =

Sighthill may refer to:

- Sighthill, Edinburgh, a district of the city of Edinburgh
  - Sighthill Stadium, a proposed stadium in Sighthill, Edinburgh
- Sighthill, Glasgow, a housing estate in the Springburn district of the city of Glasgow
