= 2023–24 Scottish League Cup =

Tournament details
- Country: Scotland
- Dates: 15 July – 17 December 2023
- Teams: 45

Final positions
- Champions: Rangers (28th title)
- Runners-up: Aberdeen

Tournament statistics
- Matches played: 95
- Goals scored: 287 (3.02 per match)
- Attendance: 359,464 (3,784 per match)
- Top goal scorer(s): Simon Murray (7 goals)

The 2023–24 Scottish League Cup, also known as the Viaplay Cup for sponsorship reasons, was the 78th season of Scotland's second-most prestigious football knockout competition.

Celtic were the two-time defending champions, but were eliminated in the second round by Kilmarnock.

Rangers won their record-extending 28th Scottish League Cup beating Aberdeen 1–0 in the final.

== Schedule ==
Round	First match date	Fixtures	Clubs
Group stage	15 July 2023	80	45 → 16
Second round	19 August 2023	8	16 → 8
Quarter finals	26 September 2023	4	8 → 4
Semi finals	4 November 2023	2	4 → 2
Final	17 December 2023	1	2 → 1

== Format ==
The competition began with eight groups of five teams. The five clubs initially competing in the UEFA Champions League (Celtic and Rangers), Europa League (Aberdeen) and Europa Conference League (Heart of Midlothian and Hibernian) received a bye to the second round. The group stage consisted of 40 teams: all remaining teams that competed across the SPFL in 2022–23, the 2022–23 Highland Football League champions (Brechin City) and 2022–23 Lowland Football League champions (The Spartans). Unlike previous seasons where the remaining group stage spot was given to the runners-up of the Highland League or Lowland League, Cowdenbeath – who finished 15th in the Lowland League, having been relegated from Scottish League Two in 2022 – accepted an invitation to participate.

The winners of each of the eight groups, as well as the three best runners-up, progressed to the second round (last 16). At this stage, the competition reverted to the traditional knock-out format. The three group winners with the highest points total and the European entrants were seeded.

=== Bonus point system ===
The traditional point system of awarding three points for a win and one point for a draw was used. In addition, for each group stage match that finished in a draw, a penalty shoot-out took place, with the winner being awarded a bonus point.

== Group stage ==
The teams were seeded according to their final league positions in 2022–23 and drawn into eight groups, with each group comprising one team from each pot. The draw for the group stage took place on 8 June 2023 and was broadcast live on Viaplay & the SPFL YouTube channel.

=== Group A ===
Pos	Team	Pld	W	PW	PL	L	GF	GA	GD	Pts	Qualification	AYR	STI	STJ	STE	ALL
1	Ayr United	4	3	1	0	0	10	2	+8	11	Qualification for the second round	—	—	—	1–0	6–0
2	Stirling Albion	4	3	0	1	0	9	3	+6	10	Qualification for the second round	1–1p	—	—	2–1	—
3	St Johnstone	4	1	0	0	3	5	7	−2	3		1–2	0–4	—	—	—
4	Stenhousemuir	4	1	0	0	3	3	6	−3	3		—	—	1–0	—	1–3
5	Alloa Athletic	4	1	0	0	3	4	13	−9	3		—	1–2	0–4	—	—

Rules for classification: 1) goal difference, 2) goals scored, 3) away goals scored, 4) matches won, 5) away matches won, 6) drawing of lots.

=== Group B ===
Pos	Team	Pld	W	PW	PL	L	GF	GA	GD	Pts	Qualification	PAR	FAL	DUN	SPA	PET
1	Partick Thistle	4	2	1	1	0	7	5	+2	9	Qualification for the second round	—	2–2p	—	2–1	—
2	Falkirk	4	2	1	0	1	8	5	+3	8		—	—	0–1	—	4–1
3	Dundee United	4	2	0	0	2	5	3	+2	6		1–2	—	—	—	3–0
4	The Spartans	4	2	0	0	2	5	5	0	6		—	1–2	1–0	—	—
5	Peterhead	4	0	0	1	3	3	10	−7	1		1–1p	—	—	1–2	—

Rules for classification: 1) goal difference, 2) goals scored, 3) away goals scored, 4) matches won, 5) away matches won, 6) drawing of lots.

=== Group C ===
Pos	Team	Pld	W	PW	PL	L	GF	GA	GD	Pts	Qualification	LIV	HAM	COV	BRE	CLY
1	Livingston	4	3	0	1	0	10	1	+9	10	Qualification for the second round	—	1–1p	—	—	1–0
2	Hamilton Academical	4	2	1	1	0	7	4	+3	9		—	—	2–2p	1–0	—
3	Cove Rangers	4	2	1	0	1	10	11	−1	8		0–5	—	—	—	5–2
4	Brechin City	4	1	0	0	3	4	8	−4	3		0–3	—	2–3	—	—
5	Clyde	4	0	0	0	4	4	11	−7	0		—	1–3	—	1–2	—

Rules for classification: 1) goal difference, 2) goals scored, 3) away goals scored, 4) matches won, 5) away matches won, 6) drawing of lots.

=== Group D ===
Pos	Team	Pld	W	PW	PL	L	GF	GA	GD	Pts	Qualification	ROS	GMO	KEL	STR	EDI
1	Ross County	4	3	0	1	0	13	6	+7	10	Qualification for the second round	—	2–1	3–3p	—	—
2	Greenock Morton	4	3	0	0	1	11	4	+7	9	Qualification for the second round	—	—	—	3–0	4–1
3	Kelty Hearts	4	2	1	0	1	11	9	+2	8		—	1–3	—	2–0	—
4	Stranraer	4	1	0	0	3	3	11	−8	3		1–5	—	—	—	2–1
5	Edinburgh City	4	0	0	0	4	6	14	−8	0		1–3	—	3–5	—	—

Rules for classification: 1) goal difference, 2) goals scored, 3) away goals scored, 4) matches won, 5) away matches won, 6) drawing of lots.

=== Group E ===
Pos	Team	Pld	W	PW	PL	L	GF	GA	GD	Pts	Qualification	AIR	DND	DUM	ICT	BON
1	Airdrieonians	4	4	0	0	0	7	2	+5	12	Qualification for the second round	—	1–0	2–0	—	—
2	Dundee	4	3	0	0	1	5	2	+3	9		—	—	3–1	1–0	—
3	Dumbarton	4	1	1	0	2	3	6	−3	5		—	—	—	2–1	p0–0
4	Inverness Caledonian Thistle	4	1	0	0	3	5	7	−2	3		2–3	—	—	—	2–1
5	Bonnyrigg Rose	4	0	0	1	3	1	4	−3	1		0–1	0–1	—	—	—

Rules for classification: 1) goal difference, 2) goals scored, 3) away goals scored, 4) matches won, 5) away matches won, 6) drawing of lots.

=== Group F ===
Pos	Team	Pld	W	PW	PL	L	GF	GA	GD	Pts	Qualification	KIL	RAI	DNF	ALB	ANN
1	Kilmarnock	4	3	0	1	0	9	3	+6	10	Qualification for the second round	—	2–2p	—	—	3–0
2	Raith Rovers	4	2	1	1	0	8	5	+3	9	Qualification for the second round	—	—	1–1p	2–0	—
3	Dunfermline Athletic	4	2	1	0	1	8	3	+5	8		0–2	—	—	—	4–0
4	Albion Rovers	4	1	0	0	3	3	8	−5	3		1–2	—	0–3	—	—
5	Annan Athletic	4	0	0	0	4	3	12	−9	0		—	2–3	—	1–2	—

Rules for classification: 1) goal difference, 2) goals scored, 3) away goals scored, 4) matches won, 5) away matches won, 6) drawing of lots.

=== Group G ===
Pos	Team	Pld	W	PW	PL	L	GF	GA	GD	Pts	Qualification	MOT	QOS	EFI	QPA	ELG
1	Motherwell	4	3	1	0	0	9	3	+6	11	Qualification for the second round	—	—	3–0	1–0	—
2	Queen of the South	4	2	0	2	0	7	4	+3	8		3–3p	—	0–0p	—	—
3	East Fife	4	1	2	0	1	3	4	−1	7		—	—	—	p0–0	3–1
4	Queen's Park	4	1	0	1	2	6	3	+3	4		—	1–2	—	—	5–0
5	Elgin City	4	0	0	0	4	1	12	−11	0		0–2	0–2	—	—	—

Rules for classification: 1) goal difference, 2) goals scored, 3) away goals scored, 4) matches won, 5) away matches won, 6) drawing of lots.

=== Group H ===
Pos	Team	Pld	W	PW	PL	L	GF	GA	GD	Pts	Qualification	STM	FOR	ARB	MON	COW
1	St Mirren	4	3	0	0	1	9	1	+8	9	Qualification for the second round	—	4–0	4–0	—	—
2	Forfar Athletic	4	3	0	0	1	6	6	0	9		—	—	3–1	—	1–0
3	Arbroath	4	1	1	0	2	5	8	−3	5		—	—	—	3–0	p1–1
4	Montrose	4	1	1	0	2	3	6	−3	5		1–0	1–2	—	—	—
5	Cowdenbeath	4	0	0	2	2	2	4	−2	2		0–1	—	—	1–1p	—

Rules for classification: 1) goal difference, 2) goals scored, 3) away goals scored, 4) matches won, 5) away matches won, 6) drawing of lots.

=== Best runners-up ===
Pos	Grp	Team	Pld	W	PW	PL	L	GF	GA	GD	Pts	Qualification
1	A	Stirling Albion	4	3	0	1	0	9	3	+6	10	Qualification for the second round
2	D	Greenock Morton	4	3	0	0	1	11	4	+7	9	Qualification for the second round
3	F	Raith Rovers	4	2	1	1	0	8	5	+3	9	Qualification for the second round
4	C	Hamilton Academical	4	2	1	1	0	7	4	+3	9	
5	E	Dundee	4	3	0	0	1	5	2	+3	9	
6	H	Forfar Athletic	4	3	0	0	1	6	6	0	9	
7	B	Falkirk	4	2	1	0	1	8	5	+3	8	
8	G	Queen of the South	4	2	0	2	0	7	4	+3	8	

Rules for classification: 1) goal difference, 2) goals scored, 3) away goals scored, 4) matches won, 5) away matches won, 6) drawing of lots.

== Knockout phase ==
=== Second round ===
==== Draw and seeding ====
Celtic, Rangers, Aberdeen, Heart of Midlothian and Hibernian entered the competition at this stage, due to their participation in UEFA club competitions. They joined the three group winners with the best records as the eight seeded sides. The other five group winners and the three best runners up were the unseeded sides.

Teams in bold advanced to the quarter-finals.

Seeded	Unseeded
**Aberdeen**; Airdrieonians†; Ayr United†; Celtic; **Heart of Midlothian**; **Hibernian**; Motherwell; **Rangers**	Greenock Morton†; **Kilmarnock**; **Livingston**; Partick Thistle†; Raith Rovers†; **Ross County**; Stirling Albion*; **St Mirren**

Notes

- † denotes teams playing in the Championship.
- * denotes team playing in League One.

==== Matches ====
18 August 2023	Stirling Albion	**1–2**	**Aberdeen**	Stirling
19:45	Spence 75'		Miovski 29'; Clarkson 63'	Stadium: Forthbank Stadium; Attendance: 2,943; Referee: David Munro

19 August 2023	**Rangers**	**2–1**	Greenock Morton	Glasgow
12:30	Dessers 60' (pen.); Danilo 68'		Gillespie 53' (pen.)	Stadium: Ibrox Stadium; Attendance: 38,943; Referee: David Dickinson

19 August 2023	Airdrieonians	**3–4** (a.e.t.)	**Ross County**	Airdrie
15:00	Gallagher 36', 82' (pen.); O'Connor 89'		Turner 6'; White 7'; Murray 38'; Brophy 101'	Stadium: Excelsior Stadium; Attendance: 1,631; Referee: Steven McLean

19 August 2023	**Livingston**	**2–0**	Ayr United	Livingston
15:00	Nouble 12'; Montaño 64'			Stadium: Almondvale Stadium; Attendance: 1,304; Referee: Kevin Clancy

19 August 2023	**St Mirren**	**1–0**	Motherwell	Paisley
15:00	Boyd-Munce 9'			Stadium: St Mirren Park; Attendance: 5,241; Referee: Willie Collum

20 August 2023	**Hibernian**	**2–1**	Raith Rovers	Edinburgh
14:00	Youan 56'; Vente 69'		Smith 67'	Stadium: Easter Road; Attendance: 8,674; Referee: Nick Walsh

20 August 2023	**Heart of Midlothian**	**4–0**	Partick Thistle	Edinburgh
14:00	Graham 10' (o.g.); Offiah 45'; Shankland 50'; Tagawa 75'			Stadium: Tynecastle Park; Attendance: 12,841; Referee: John Beaton

20 August 2023	**Kilmarnock**	**1–0**	Celtic	Kilmarnock
15:00	Watkins 59'			Stadium: Rugby Park; Attendance: 8,002; Referee: Alan Muir

=== Quarter-finals ===
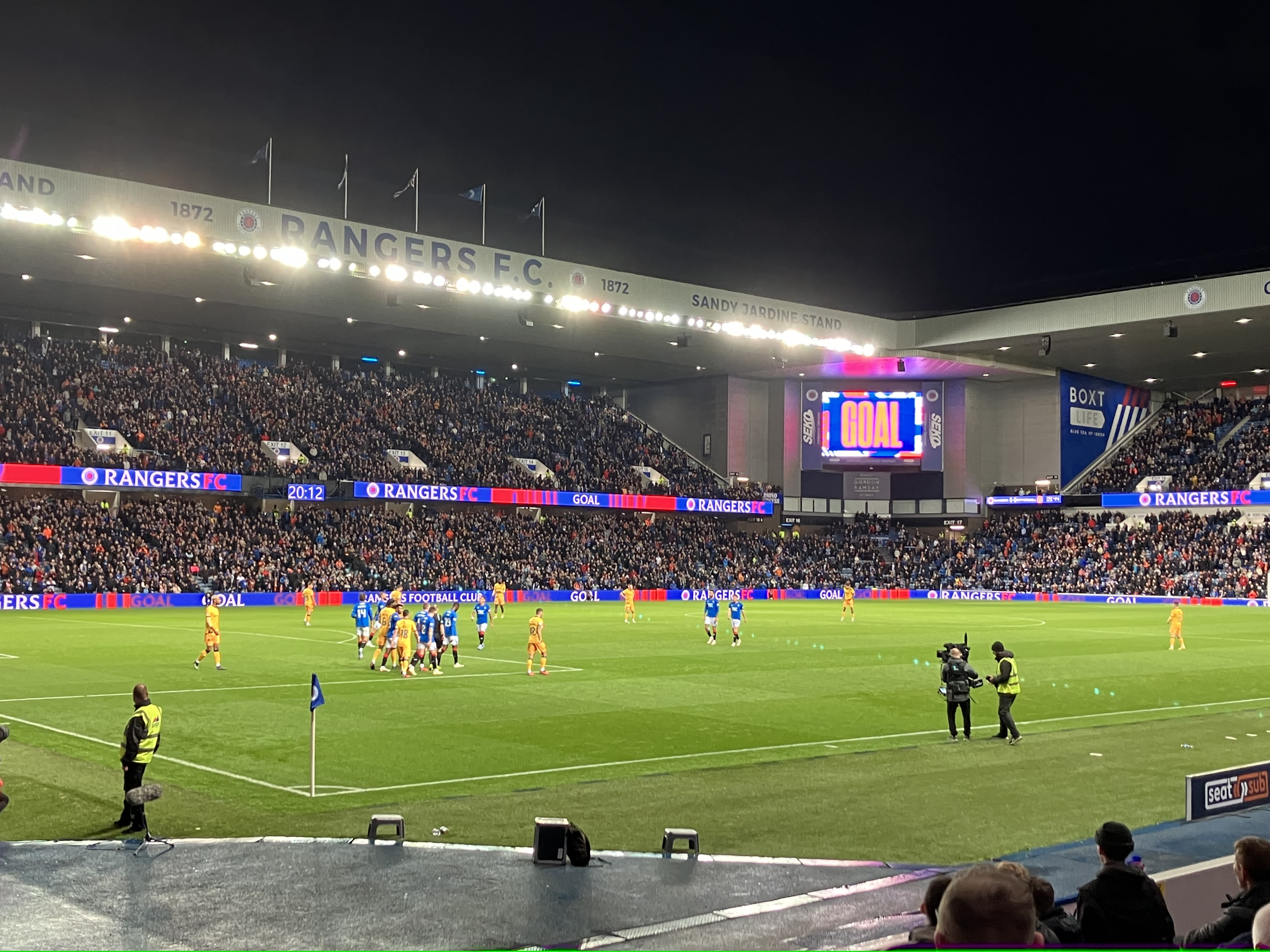
Rangers vs Livingston at Ibrox Stadium, 27 September 2023

The draw took place on Sunday 20 August 2023 following the Kilmarnock v Celtic match live on Viaplay Sports 1.

Teams in bold advanced to the semi-finals.

Premiership
- **Aberdeen**
- **Heart of Midlothian**
- **Hibernian**
- Kilmarnock
- Livingston
- **Rangers**
- Ross County
- St Mirren

26 September 2023	Kilmarnock	**1–2**	**Heart of Midlothian**	Kilmarnock
19:45	Lyons 68'		Grant 40'; Lowry 90'	Stadium: Rugby Park; Attendance: 6,014; Referee: Steven McLean

27 September 2023	**Hibernian**	**4–2**	St Mirren	Edinburgh
19:45	Youan 52'; Vente 54'; Boyle 80', 90'		Tanser 43'; Baccus 76'	Stadium: Easter Road; Attendance: 9,982; Referee: David Munro

27 September 2023	Ross County	**1–2**	**Aberdeen**	Dingwall
19:45	Turner 83' (pen.)		Shinnie 8'; Sokler 80'	Stadium: Victoria Park; Attendance: 4,637; Referee: John Beaton

27 September 2023	**Rangers**	**4–0**	Livingston	Glasgow
20:00	Sima 10'; Yılmaz 66'; de Lucas 84' (o.g.); Jack 90'			Stadium: Ibrox Stadium; Attendance: 35,420; Referee: Willie Collum

=== Semi-finals ===
The draw took place on Wednesday 27 September 2023 following the Rangers v Livingston match live on Viaplay Sports 1.

Teams in bold advanced to the final.

Premiership
- **Aberdeen**
- Heart of Midlothian
- Hibernian
- **Rangers**

4 November 2023	Hibernian	**0–1**	**Aberdeen**	Glasgow
17:15			Miovski 78'	Stadium: Hampden Park; Attendance: 28,295; Referee: John Beaton

5 November 2023	Heart of Midlothian	**1–3**	**Rangers**	Glasgow
15:00	Shankland 81' (pen.)		Tavernier 50' (pen.), 64'; Wright 55'	Stadium: Hampden Park; Attendance: 44,734; Referee: Nick Walsh

=== Final ===
17 December 2023	**Rangers**	**1–0**	Aberdeen	Glasgow
15:00	Tavernier 76'			Stadium: Hampden Park; Attendance: 49,296; Referee: Don Robertson

== Media coverage ==
The domestic broadcasting rights for the competition are held exclusively by Viaplay Sports, who will broadcast between 12 and 16 live matches per season, as well as highlights.

The following matches were broadcast live on UK television:

Round	Date	Match
Group stage	15 July 2023	Raith Rovers v Dunfermline Athletic
Group stage	18 July 2023	Dundee United v Partick Thistle
Group stage	22 July 2023	Motherwell v Queen's Park
Group stage	25 July 2023	Falkirk v Dundee United
Group stage	30 July 2023	Dundee v Inverness Caledonian Thistle
Second round	19 August 2023	Rangers v Greenock Morton
Second round	20 August 2023	Kilmarnock v Celtic
Quarter-Finals	26 September 2023	Kilmarnock v Heart of Midlothian
Quarter-Finals	27 September 2023	Rangers v Livingston
Semi-Finals	4 November 2023	Hibernian v Aberdeen
Semi-Finals	5 November 2023	Heart of Midlothian v Rangers
Final	17 December 2023	Rangers v Aberdeen
