= Meadowbank railway station =

Meadowbank railway station may refer to:

- Meadowbank railway station, Sydney, Australia
- Meadowbank railway station, Auckland in New Zealand
- Meadowbank Stadium railway station, a closed railway station in Edinburgh, Scotland
