= 2023–24 Scottish League Cup group stage =

2023–24 Scottish League Cup (group stage)
Tournament details
- Country: Scotland
- Dates: 15 July 2023 – 30 July 2023
- Teams: 40

Tournament statistics
- Matches played: 80
- Goals scored: 241 (3.01 per match)
- Top goal scorer(s): Simon Murray (6 goals)

The 2023–24 Scottish League Cup group stage was played from 15 to 30 July 2023. A total of 40 teams competed in the group stage. The winners of each of the eight groups, as well as the three best runners-up progressed to the second round (last 16) of the 2023–24 Scottish League Cup.

== Format ==
The competition begins with eight groups of five teams; with each team playing one match only against each other team in the group, either home or away, for a total of two home and two away matches. The five clubs initially competing in the UEFA Champions League (Celtic and Rangers), Europa League (Aberdeen) and Europa Conference League (Heart of Midlothian and Hibernian) qualifying rounds receive a bye to the second round. The group stage consists of 40 teams: all remaining teams that competed across the SPFL in 2022–23, the 2022–23 Highland Football League champions (Brechin City) and 2022–23 Lowland Football League champions (The Spartans). Unlike previous seasons where the remaining group stage spot was given to the runners-up of the Highland League or Lowland League, Cowdenbeath – who finished 15th in the Lowland League, having been relegated from Scottish League Two in 2022 – accepted an invitation to participate.

The winners of each of the eight groups, as well as the three best runners-up, will progress to the second round (last 16). At this stage, the competition reverts to the traditional knock-out format. The three group winners with the highest points total and the European entrants will be seeded.

The traditional point system of awarding three points for a win and one point for a draw is used; however, for each group stage match that finishes in a draw, a penalty shoot-out takes place, with the winner being awarded a bonus point.

The draw for the group stage took place on 8 June 2023 and was broadcast live on Viaplay & the SPFL YouTube channel.

== Teams ==
The teams were seeded according to their final league positions in 2022–23 and drawn into eight groups, with each group comprising one team from each pot.

=== Seeding ===
Teams in Bold qualified for the second round.

Pot 1	Pot 2	Pot 3	Pot 4	Pot 5
01. **St Mirren**; 02. **Motherwell**; 03. **Livingston**; 04. St Johnstone; 05. **Kilmarnock**; 06. **Ross County**; 07. Dundee United; 08. Dundee	09. **Ayr United**; 10. Queen's Park; 11. **Partick Thistle**; 12. **Greenock Morton**; 13. Inverness Caledonian Thistle; 14. **Raith Rovers**; 15. Arbroath; 16. Hamilton Academical	17. Cove Rangers; 18. Dunfermline Athletic; 19. Falkirk; 20. **Airdrieonians**; 21. Alloa Athletic; 22. Queen of the South; 23. Edinburgh City; 24. Montrose	25. Kelty Hearts; 26. Clyde; 27. Peterhead; 28. **Stirling Albion**; 29. Dumbarton; 30. Annan Athletic; 31. East Fife; 32. Forfar Athletic	33. Stenhousemuir; 34. Stranraer; 35. Bonnyrigg Rose; 36. Elgin City; 37. Albion Rovers; 38. Brechin City; 39. The Spartans; 40. Cowdenbeath

== Group stage ==
All times are BST (UTC +1).

=== Group A ===
Pos	Team	Pld	W	PW	PL	L	GF	GA	GD	Pts	Qualification	AYR	STI	STJ	STE	ALL
1	Ayr United	4	3	1	0	0	10	2	+8	11	Qualification for the second round	—	—	—	1–0	6–0
2	Stirling Albion	4	3	0	1	0	9	3	+6	10	Qualification for the second round	1–1p	—	—	2–1	—
3	St Johnstone	4	1	0	0	3	5	7	−2	3		1–2	0–4	—	—	—
4	Stenhousemuir	4	1	0	0	3	3	6	−3	3		—	—	1–0	—	1–3
5	Alloa Athletic	4	1	0	0	3	4	13	−9	3		—	1–2	0–4	—	—

Rules for classification: 1) goal difference, 2) goals scored, 3) away goals scored, 4) matches won, 5) away matches won, 6) drawing of lots.

==== Matches ====
15 July 2023
15:00

Stenhousemuir	1–0	St Johnstone
O'Reilly 49'

Ochilview Park, Stenhousemuir
Attendance: 1,376
Referee: Calum Scott
15 July 2023
15:00

Stirling Albion	1–1	Ayr United
McGeachie 21'		Bryden 84'
Penalties
Banner (penalty missed); Spence (penalty scored); Cummins (penalty scored); Clark (penalty scored); Dunsmore (penalty missed)	3–4	(penalty scored) McKenzie; (penalty scored) Murphy; (penalty scored) McGinty; (penalty scored) Dempsey

Forthbank Stadium, Stirling
Attendance: 791
Referee: Steven Kirkland
18 July 2023
19:45

Alloa Athletic	1–2	Stirling Albion
Coulson 62'		McLean 75'; Carrick 88' (pen.)

Recreation Park, Alloa
Attendance: 689
Referee: Alasdair Greive
18 July 2023
19:45

Ayr United	1–0	Stenhousemuir
McKenzie 27'

Townhead Park, Cumnock
Attendance: 757
Referee: Willie Collum
22 July 2023
15:00

Alloa Athletic	0–4	St Johnstone
		Ballantyne 1'; McGowan 20'; May 63'; McCrystal 89'

Recreation Park, Alloa
Attendance: 992
Referee: Grant Irvine
22 July 2023
15:00

Stirling Albion	2–1	Stenhousemuir
Carrick 3'; Dunsmore 24'		Yates 45'

Forthbank Stadium, Stirling
Attendance: 700
Referee: Duncan Williams
25 July 2023
19:45

St Johnstone	1–2	Ayr United
Kucheriavyi 43'		Stanger 29'; Dempsey 71'

McDiarmid Park, Perth
Attendance: 2,669
Referee: Nick Walsh
25 July 2023
19:45

Stenhousemuir	1–3	Alloa Athletic
Brown 29'		Buchanan 37'; Sammon 72'; Neill 79'

Ochilview Park, Stenhousemuir
Attendance: 367
Referee: Chris Fordyce
29 July 2023
15:00

Ayr United	6–0	Alloa Athletic
Bryden 14', 62'; McAllister 37'; Murphy 45+1'; Pendlebury 70'; Rose 84'

Somerset Park, Ayr
Attendance: 1,498
Referee: Don Robertson
29 July 2023
15:00

St Johnstone	0–4	Stirling Albion
		Spence 11'; Milne 36'; McLean 48', 54'

McDiarmid Park, Perth
Attendance: 2,052
Referee: Euan Anderson

=== Group B ===
Pos	Team	Pld	W	PW	PL	L	GF	GA	GD	Pts	Qualification	PAR	FAL	DUN	SPA	PET
1	Partick Thistle	4	2	1	1	0	7	5	+2	9	Qualification for the second round	—	2–2p	—	2–1	—
2	Falkirk	4	2	1	0	1	8	5	+3	8		—	—	0–1	—	4–1
3	Dundee United	4	2	0	0	2	5	3	+2	6		1–2	—	—	—	3–0
4	The Spartans	4	2	0	0	2	5	5	0	6		—	1–2	1–0	—	—
5	Peterhead	4	0	0	1	3	3	10	−7	1		1–1p	—	—	1–2	—

Rules for classification: 1) goal difference, 2) goals scored, 3) away goals scored, 4) matches won, 5) away matches won, 6) drawing of lots.

==== Matches ====
15 July 2023
15:00

Peterhead	1–1	Partick Thistle
Ritchie 32'		Milne 3'
Penalties
McKee (penalty missed); McCarthy (penalty scored); Ritchie (penalty scored); Ward (penalty scored); Jas. Brown (penalty scored); R. Strachan (penalty scored); O'Keefe (penalty scored); D. Strachan (penalty scored); Reid (penalty scored); McKenzie (penalty missed); McKee (penalty scored); McCarthy (penalty missed)	9–10	(penalty scored) Stanway; (penalty scored) Lawless; (penalty scored) Milne; (penalty missed) Graham; (penalty scored) Muirhead; (penalty scored) Lyon; (penalty scored) Fitzpatick; (penalty scored) Williams; (penalty scored) McKenzie; (penalty missed) Sneddon; (penalty scored) Stanway; (penalty scored) Lawless

Balmoor Stadium, Peterhead
Attendance: 834
Referee: Dan McFarlane
15 July 2023
15:00

The Spartans	1–0	Dundee United
Henderson 11'

Ainslie Park, Edinburgh
Attendance: 1,701
Referee: Stewart Luke
18 July 2023
19:45

Dundee United	1–2	Partick Thistle
Sibbald 18'		Graham 32'; Milne 58'

Tannadice Park, Dundee
Attendance: 3,147
Referee: Matthew MacDermid
18 July 2023
19:45

The Spartans	1–2	Falkirk
Henderson 60'		Lang 6'; MacIver 88'

Ainslie Park, Edinburgh
Attendance: 874
Referee: Duncan Williams
22 July 2023
15:00

Dundee United	3–0	Peterhead
Moult 22'; Holt 76' (pen.), 79' (pen.)

Tannadice Park, Dundee
Attendance: 2,103
Referee: Calum Scott
22 July 2023
15:00

Partick Thistle	2–2	Falkirk
Graham 68'; Lyon 90'		MacIver 14'; Agyeman 71'
Penalties
Muirhead (penalty scored); Lawless (penalty missed); Milne (penalty scored); Graham (penalty missed); Dowds (penalty scored); Fitzpatrick (penalty scored); Lyon (penalty scored); Bannigan (penalty scored); MacKenzie (penalty missed)	6–7	(penalty scored) Donaldson; (penalty scored) Oliver; (penalty scored) Miller; (penalty missed) McKay; (penalty missed) Oluwasegan; (penalty scored) Yeats; (penalty scored) Agyeman; (penalty scored) Lang; (penalty scored) McCann

Firhill Stadium, Glasgow
Attendance: 2,607
Referee: Steven Kirkland
25 July 2023
19:45

Falkirk	0–1	Dundee United
		Fotheringham 28'

Falkirk Stadium, Falkirk
Attendance: 3,186
Referee: David Munro
26 July 2023
19:45

Peterhead	1–2	The Spartans
Shanks 50'		Henderson 9'; Russell 55'

Balmoor Stadium, Peterhead
Attendance: 678
Referee: Colin Whyte
29 July 2023
15:00

Falkirk	4–1	Peterhead
Lang 29'; MacIver 45+2'; Agyeman 47'; Miller 56'		O'Keefe 6'

Falkirk Stadium, Falkirk
Attendance: 1,779
Referee: Alastair Grieve
29 July 2023
15:00

Partick Thistle	2–1	The Spartans
Lyon 52'; Graham 88' (pen.)		Henderson 81'

Firhill Stadium, Glasgow
Attendance: 2,231
Referee: Gavin Duncan

=== Group C ===
Pos	Team	Pld	W	PW	PL	L	GF	GA	GD	Pts	Qualification	LIV	HAM	COV	BRE	CLY
1	Livingston	4	3	0	1	0	10	1	+9	10	Qualification for the second round	—	1–1p	—	—	1–0
2	Hamilton Academical	4	2	1	1	0	7	4	+3	9		—	—	2–2p	1–0	—
3	Cove Rangers	4	2	1	0	1	10	11	−1	8		0–5	—	—	—	5–2
4	Brechin City	4	1	0	0	3	4	8	−4	3		0–3	—	2–3	—	—
5	Clyde	4	0	0	0	4	4	11	−7	0		—	1–3	—	1–2	—

Rules for classification: 1) goal difference, 2) goals scored, 3) away goals scored, 4) matches won, 5) away matches won, 6) drawing of lots.

==== Matches ====
15 July 2023
15:00

Brechin City	0–3	Livingston
		Nouble 41'; Kelly 53'; Montaño 87'

Glebe Park, Brechin
Attendance: 585
Referee: Colin Steven
15 July 2023
15:00

Clyde	1–3	Hamilton Academical
Scullion 16'		Winter 64'; McGlynn 88'; Martin 90+2'

New Douglas Park, Hamilton
Attendance: 792
Referee: George Calder
18 July 2023
19:45

Cove Rangers	5–2	Clyde
Connell 13', 81'; Burrell 21', 26'; Megginson 83'		Rennie 20' (pen.); Mulvanny 84'

Balmoral Stadium, Aberdeen
Attendance: 394
Referee: Gavin Duncan
18 July 2023
19:45

Hamilton Academical	1–0	Brechin City
O'Hara 22' (pen.)

New Douglas Park, Hamilton
Attendance: 530
Referee: Iain Snedden
22 July 2023
15:00

Brechin City	2–3	Cove Rangers
McGrath 30'; Loudon 39' (pen.)		Reynolds 34'; Connell 74', 81'

Glebe Park, Brechin
Attendance: 544
Referee: Scott Lambie
22 July 2023
15:00

Livingston	1–1	Hamilton Academical
Anderson 90'		Winter 31'
Penalties
Devlin (penalty missed); Nouble (penalty missed); Kelly (penalty scored)	1–4	(penalty scored) Martin; (penalty scored) MacDonald; (penalty scored) Zanatta; (penalty scored) Murray

Almondvale Stadium, Livingston
Attendance: 923
Referee: Craig Napier
25 July 2023
19:45

Clyde	1–2	Brechin City
Cameron 50'		Loudon 45+1'; McGrath 48'

New Douglas Park, Hamilton
Attendance: 312
Referee: Stewart Luke
25 July 2023
19:45

Cove Rangers	0–5	Livingston
	-	Parkes 44'; Obileye 55'; Anderson 59'; St. Kelly 81', 90+2'

Balmoral Stadium, Aberdeen
Attendance: 683
Referee: David Dickinson
29 July 2023
15:00

Hamilton Academical	2–2	Cove Rangers
O'Hara 13'; Tumilty 90+6'		Gallagher 44'; Burrell 60'
Penalties
O'Hara (penalty scored); Murray (penalty scored); Zanatta (penalty missed); McGlynn (penalty missed)	2–4	(penalty scored) Kerr; (penalty scored) Burrell; (penalty scored) Golding; (penalty scored) Mykyta

New Douglas Park, Hamilton
Attendance: 659
Referee: Stewart Luke
29 July 2023
15:00

Livingston	1–0	Clyde
Anderson 75'

Almondvale Stadium, Livingston
Attendance: 872
Referee: Willie Collum

=== Group D ===
Pos	Team	Pld	W	PW	PL	L	GF	GA	GD	Pts	Qualification	ROS	GMO	KEL	STR	EDI
1	Ross County	4	3	0	1	0	13	6	+7	10	Qualification for the second round	—	2–1	3–3p	—	—
2	Greenock Morton	4	3	0	0	1	11	4	+7	9	Qualification for the second round	—	—	—	3–0	4–1
3	Kelty Hearts	4	2	1	0	1	11	9	+2	8		—	1–3	—	2–0	—
4	Stranraer	4	1	0	0	3	3	11	−8	3		1–5	—	—	—	2–1
5	Edinburgh City	4	0	0	0	4	6	14	−8	0		1–3	—	3–5	—	—

Rules for classification: 1) goal difference, 2) goals scored, 3) away goals scored, 4) matches won, 5) away matches won, 6) drawing of lots.

==== Matches ====
15 July 2023
15:00

Kelty Hearts	1–3	Greenock Morton
Daramola 45+1'		Boyd 58'; Crawford 64'; Broadfoot 90+3'

New Central Park, Kelty
Attendance: 649
Referee: Peter Stuart
15 July 2023
15:00

Stranraer	1–5	Ross County
Robertson 72'		Ross 12' (o.g.); Murray 26', 62', 85'; Baldwin 89'

Stair Park, Stranraer
Attendance: 372
Referee: Grant Irvine
18 July 2023
19:45

Greenock Morton	3–0	Stranraer
Baird 22'; Blues 49'; Crawford 73'

Cappielow, Greenock
Attendance: 1,302
Referee: Steven McLean
19 July 2023
19:45

Edinburgh City	3–5	Kelty Hearts
Mercer 4'; McLean 7', 20'		Johnston 27', 49'; Daramola 42', 45+3'; Cunningham 54'

Meadowbank Stadium, Edinburgh
Attendance: 426
Referee: Colin Whyte
22 July 2023
15:00

Ross County	2–1	Greenock Morton
Henderson 70'; Murray 78'		Oakley 37'

Victoria Park, Dingwall
Attendance: 1,225
Referee: Don Robertson
22 July 2023
15:00

Stranraer	2–1	Edinburgh City
Armour 38'; Orr 79' (pen.)		Shanley 49'

Stair Park, Stranraer
Attendance: 292
Referee: Ross Hardie
25 July 2023
19:45

Kelty Hearts	2–0	Stranraer
Daramola 5'; Johnston 65'

New Central Park, Kelty
Attendance: 254
Referee: Craig Napier
26 July 2023
19:45

Edinburgh City	1–3	Ross County
Shanley 51'		Randall 20'; Murray 48'; White 59'

Meadowbank Stadium, Edinburgh
Attendance: 449
Referee: Colin Steven
29 July 2023
15:00

Greenock Morton	4–1	Edinburgh City
Broadfoot 33'; Crawford 67'; King 75'; Blues 88'		Murray 83'

Cappielow, Greenock
Attendance: 1,404
Referee: Calum Scott
29 July 2023
15:00

Ross County	3–3	Kelty Hearts
Sims 13'; Murray 29'; Brown 86'		McCluskey 37'; Biabi 57'; Cunningham 90+3' (pen.)
Penalties
Dhanda (penalty scored); Turner (penalty scored); Brophy (penalty scored); Allardice (penalty missed); Sims (penalty missed)	3–4	(penalty scored) Cunningham; (penalty scored) Moore; (penalty scored) Lyon; (penalty missed) Daramola; (penalty scored) Biabi

Victoria Park, Dingwall
Attendance: 1,026
Referee: Steven McLean

=== Group E ===
Pos	Team	Pld	W	PW	PL	L	GF	GA	GD	Pts	Qualification	AIR	DND	DUM	ICT	BON
1	Airdrieonians	4	4	0	0	0	7	2	+5	12	Qualification for the second round	—	1–0	2–0	—	—
2	Dundee	4	3	0	0	1	5	2	+3	9		—	—	3–1	1–0	—
3	Dumbarton	4	1	1	0	2	3	6	−3	5		—	—	—	2–1	p0–0
4	Inverness Caledonian Thistle	4	1	0	0	3	5	7	−2	3		2–3	—	—	—	2–1
5	Bonnyrigg Rose	4	0	0	1	3	1	4	−3	1		0–1	0–1	—	—	—

Rules for classification: 1) goal difference, 2) goals scored, 3) away goals scored, 4) matches won, 5) away matches won, 6) drawing of lots.

==== Matches ====
15 July 2023
15:00

Airdrieonians	2–0	Dumbarton
Todorov 86'; McGregor 88'

Excelsior Stadium, Airdrie
Attendance: 830
Referee: Graham Grainger
15 July 2023
15:00

Inverness Caledonian Thistle	2–1	Bonnyrigg Rose
Doran 4', 40'		McGachie 90'

Caledonian Stadium, Inverness
Attendance: 1,077
Referee: Scott Lambie
18 July 2023
19:45

Bonnyrigg Rose	0–1	Dundee
		Rudden 47'

New Dundas Park, Bonnyrigg
Attendance: 1,555
Referee: Peter Stuart
18 July 2023
19:45

Dumbarton	2–1	Inverness Caledonian Thistle
R.Wallace 27'; T.Wallace 50'		McKay 76'

Dumbarton Football Stadium, Dumbarton
Attendance: 505
Referee: Chris Fordyce
22 July 2023
15:00

Airdrieonians	1–0	Dundee
McCabe 89' (pen.)

Excelsior Stadium, Airdrie
Attendance: 1,489
Referee: Colin Steven
22 July 2023
15:00

Dumbarton	0–0	Bonnyrigg Rose
Penalties
R.Wallace (penalty scored); Wilson (penalty scored); Ruth (penalty scored); MacLean (penalty missed); T.Wallace (penalty scored)	4–3	(penalty scored) Martyniuk; (penalty scored) Jarvis; (penalty missed) Currie; (penalty missed) Watson; (penalty scored) Doan

Dumbarton Football Stadium, Dumbarton
Attendance: 401
Referee: Dan McFarlane
25 July 2023
19:45

Inverness Caledonian Thistle	2–3	Airdrieonians
Gilmour 62'; Mckay 78' (pen.)		Ballantyne 22'; Telfer 29'; Todorov 88'

Caledonian Stadium, Inverness
Attendance: 1,115
Referee: Matthew MacDermid
26 July 2023
19:45

Dundee	3–1	Dumbarton
Robinson 38', 77' (pen.); Pineda 44'		T.Wallace 41'

Dens Park, Dundee
Attendance: 1,940
Referee: Willie Collum
29 July 2023
15:00

Bonnyrigg Rose	0–1	Airdrieonians
		O'Connor 73' (pen.)

New Dundas Park, Bonnyrigg
Attendance: 1,153
Referee: Chris Fordyce
30 July 2023
15:00

Dundee	1–0	Inverness Caledonian Thistle
Robinson 60'

Dens Park, Dundee
Attendance: 2,337
Referee: John Beaton

=== Group F ===
Pos	Team	Pld	W	PW	PL	L	GF	GA	GD	Pts	Qualification	KIL	RAI	DNF	ALB	ANN
1	Kilmarnock	4	3	0	1	0	9	3	+6	10	Qualification for the second round	—	2–2p	—	—	3–0
2	Raith Rovers	4	2	1	1	0	8	5	+3	9	Qualification for the second round	—	—	1–1p	2–0	—
3	Dunfermline Athletic	4	2	1	0	1	8	3	+5	8		0–2	—	—	—	4–0
4	Albion Rovers	4	1	0	0	3	3	8	−5	3		1–2	—	0–3	—	—
5	Annan Athletic	4	0	0	0	4	3	12	−9	0		—	2–3	—	1–2	—

Rules for classification: 1) goal difference, 2) goals scored, 3) away goals scored, 4) matches won, 5) away matches won, 6) drawing of lots.

==== Matches ====
15 July 2023
15:00

Kilmarnock	3–0	Annan Athletic
Armstrong 5' (pen.); Murray 16'; Cameron 50'

Rugby Park, Kilmarnock
Attendance: 3,142
Referee: Craig Napier
15 July 2023
17:15

Raith Rovers	1–1	Dunfermline Athletic
Easton 38'		McCann 30'
Penalties
Gullan (penalty missed); Arnott (penalty scored); Easton (penalty scored); Vaughan (penalty missed)	2–4	(penalty scored) McCann; (penalty scored) Fisher; (penalty scored) Chalmers; (penalty missed) Allan; (penalty scored) Todd

Stark's Park, Kirkcaldy
Attendance: 4,022
Referee: Don Robertson
18 July 2023
19:45

Dunfermline Athletic	4–0	Annan Athletic
Fisher 17'; Douglas 23' (o.g.); McCann 55', 59'

East End Park, Dunfermline
Attendance: 1,364
Referee: Lloyd Wilson
18 July 2023
19:45

Raith Rovers	2–0	Albion Rovers
Mullin 76'; Duffy 90' (o.g.)

Stark's Park, Kirkcaldy
Attendance: 1,088
Referee: Colin Steven
22 July 2023
15:00

Annan Athletic	1–2	Albion Rovers
Goss 43'		Prince 77'; Joseph 82'

Galabank, Annan
Attendance: 309
Referee: Iain Snedden
22 July 2023
15:00

Dunfermline Athletic	0–2	Kilmarnock
		Murray 4'; Vassell 81'

East End Park, Dunfermline
Attendance: 2,784
Referee: Euan Anderson
25 July 2023
19:45

Albion Rovers	0–3	Dunfermline Athletic
		Edwards 23'; Wighton 80'; Sutherland 88'

Cliftonhill, Coatbridge
Attendance: 824
Referee: Gavin Duncan
26 July 2023
19:45

Kilmarnock	2–2	Raith Rovers
Cameron 42'; Findlay 80'		Easton 46'; Dick 74'
Penalties
Armstrong (penalty missed); Kennedy (penalty scored); Magennis (penalty scored); Watkins (penalty scored); Polworth (penalty scored); Cameron (penalty missed)	4–5	(penalty scored) Mullin; (penalty scored) Smith; (penalty scored) Hamilton; (penalty scored) Vaughan; (penalty missed) Easton; (penalty scored) Corr

Rugby Park, Kilmarnock
Attendance: 3,316
Referee: John Beaton
29 July 2023
15:00

Albion Rovers	1–2	Kilmarnock
Joseph 62'		Findlay 7'; Watkins 41'

Cliftonhill, Coatbridge
Attendance: 1,093
Referee: Dan McFarlane
29 July 2023
15:00

Annan Athletic	2–3	Raith Rovers
Galloway 27'; Luissint 37'		Watson 11'; Smith 51'; Vaughan 79' (pen.)

Galabank, Annan
Attendance: 419
Referee: Scott Lambie

=== Group G ===
Pos	Team	Pld	W	PW	PL	L	GF	GA	GD	Pts	Qualification	MOT	QOS	EFI	QPA	ELG
1	Motherwell	4	3	1	0	0	9	3	+6	11	Qualification for the second round	—	—	3–0	1–0	—
2	Queen of the South	4	2	0	2	0	7	4	+3	8		3–3p	—	0–0p	—	—
3	East Fife	4	1	2	0	1	3	4	−1	7		—	—	—	p0–0	3–1
4	Queen's Park	4	1	0	1	2	6	3	+3	4		—	1–2	—	—	5–0
5	Elgin City	4	0	0	0	4	1	12	−11	0		0–2	0–2	—	—	—

Rules for classification: 1) goal difference, 2) goals scored, 3) away goals scored, 4) matches won, 5) away matches won, 6) drawing of lots.

==== Matches ====
15 July 2023
15:00

East Fife	0–0	Queen's Park
Penalties
Walls (penalty scored); Shepherd (penalty scored); Healy (penalty scored); Trouten (penalty scored)	4–2	(penalty scored) Thomas; (penalty missed) Spong; (penalty scored) Turner; (penalty missed) McLeish

Bayview Stadium, Methil
Attendance: 584
Referee: Lloyd Wilson
15 July 2023
15:00

Elgin City	0–2	Motherwell
		Miller 25'; Obika 76'

Borough Briggs, Elgin
Attendance: 2,026
Referee: Iain Snedden
18 July 2023
19:45

East Fife	3–1	Elgin City
Austin 2', 39', 79'		Dingwall 77'

Bayview Stadium, Methil
Attendance: 374
Referee: Steven Kirkland
18 July 2023
19:45

Queen of the South	3–3	Motherwell
McKechnie 18'; Reilly 73', 83' (pen.)		Spittal 40', 75'; Slattery 56'
Penalties
Reilly (penalty scored); Mimnaugh (penalty scored); McKay (penalty scored); Todd (penalty scored); McKechnie (penalty missed)	4–5	(penalty scored) Spittal; (penalty scored) Wilkinson; (penalty scored) Slattery; (penalty scored) McGinn; (penalty scored) O'Donnell

Palmerston Park, Dumfries
Attendance: 1,756
Referee: Craig Napier
22 July 2023
15:00

Elgin City	0–2	Queen of the South
		McKechnie 17'; McKay 89'

Borough Briggs, Elgin
Attendance: 517
Referee: Peter Stuart
22 July 2023
17:15

Motherwell	1–0	Queen's Park
Obika 29'

Fir Park, Motherwell
Attendance: 3,161
Referee: Steven McLean
25 July 2023
19:45

Queen of the South	0–0	East Fife
Penalties
Reilly (penalty missed); Mimnaugh (penalty scored); McKay (penalty scored); Todd (penalty scored)	3–5	(penalty scored) McManus; (penalty scored) Shepherd; (penalty scored) Murdoch; (penalty scored) Walls; (penalty scored) Newton

Palmerston Park, Dumfries
Attendance: 1,101
Referee: Graham Grainger
25 July 2023
19:45

Queen's Park	5–0	Elgin City
Paton 7', 33', 53', 66'; Fox 80'

Lesser Hampden, Glasgow
Attendance: 676
Referee: Chris Graham
29 July 2023
15:00

Motherwell	3–0	East Fife
Miller 32'; Wilkinson 36'; Slattery 66'

Fir Park, Motherwell
Attendance: 3,076
Referee: Kevin Clancy
29 July 2023
15:00

Queen's Park	1–2	Queen of the South
Healy 89'		Reilly 65'; Cochrane 77'

Lesser Hampden, Glasgow
Attendance: 826
Referee: Grant Irvine

=== Group H ===
Pos	Team	Pld	W	PW	PL	L	GF	GA	GD	Pts	Qualification	STM	FOR	ARB	MON	COW
1	St Mirren	4	3	0	0	1	9	1	+8	9	Qualification for the second round	—	4–0	4–0	—	—
2	Forfar Athletic	4	3	0	0	1	6	6	0	9		—	—	3–1	—	1–0
3	Arbroath	4	1	1	0	2	5	8	−3	5		—	—	—	3–0	p1–1
4	Montrose	4	1	1	0	2	3	6	−3	5		1–0	1–2	—	—	—
5	Cowdenbeath	4	0	0	2	2	2	4	−2	2		0–1	—	—	1–1p	—

Rules for classification: 1) goal difference, 2) goals scored, 3) away goals scored, 4) matches won, 5) away matches won, 6) drawing of lots.

==== Matches ====
15 July 2023
15:00

Forfar Athletic	1–0	Cowdenbeath
Inglis 20'

Station Park, Forfar, Forfar
Attendance: 422
Referee: Colin Whyte
15 July 2023
15:00

Montrose	1–0	St Mirren
McAllister 58'

Links Park, Montrose
Attendance: 1,618
Referee: Willie Collum
18 July 2023
19:45

Montrose	1–2	Forfar Athletic
Hester 56'		Skelly 34' (pen.); Ross 40'

Links Park, Montrose
Attendance: 735
Referee: George Calder
19 July 2023
19:45

Arbroath	1–1	Cowdenbeath
McKenna 51' (pen.)		Docherty 61'
Penalties
McKenna (penalty scored); Stowe (penalty scored); McIntosh (penalty missed); Dünnwald-Turan (penalty missed); Slater (penalty missed); Steele (penalty scored); O'Brien (penalty scored)	4–3	(penalty missed) Walker; (penalty scored) Jack; (penalty missed) McNab; (penalty missed) MacPherson; (penalty scored) Murray; (penalty scored) Butterworth; (penalty missed) Tait

Gayfield Park, Arbroath
Attendance: 1,010
Referee: Scott Lambie
22 July 2023
15:00

Cowdenbeath	1–1	Montrose
Docherty 72' (pen.)		Webster 60'
Penalties
Docherty (penalty scored); Walker (penalty missed); Chalmers (penalty scored); Butterworth (penalty scored); McDonald (penalty scored); Murray (penalty missed); Jordan (penalty missed)	4–5	(penalty missed) McAllister; (penalty scored) Hester; (penalty scored) Batchelor; (penalty scored) Webster; (penalty scored) Lyons; (penalty missed) Masson; (penalty scored) Towler

Central Park, Cowdenbeath
Attendance: 303
Referee: Alastair Grieve
22 July 2023
15:00

St Mirren	4–0	Arbroath
Mandron 10'; O'Hara 45'; Nahmani 71', 79'

St Mirren Park, Paisley
Attendance: 2,059
Referee: Graham Grainger
25 July 2023
19:45

Cowdenbeath	0–1	St Mirren
		Olusanya 90+4'

Central Park, Cowdenbeath
Attendance: 859
Referee: Ross Hardie
25 July 2023
19:45

Forfar Athletic	3–1	Arbroath
Morrison 10'; Nditi 61'; Skelly 86'		Bird 41'

Station Park, Forfar
Attendance: 1,129
Referee: Duncan Williams
29 July 2023
15:00

Arbroath	3–0	Montrose
McIntosh 12'; Dünnwald-Turan 70'; Bird 79'

Gayfield Park, Arbroath
Attendance: 1,408
Referee: Chris Graham
29 July 2023
15:00

St Mirren	4–0	Forfar Athletic
Mandron 14', 19'; O'Hara 42' (pen.); Gogić 45+1'

St Mirren Park, Paisley
Attendance: 2,380
Referee: Matthew MacDermid

== Best runners-up ==
Pos	Grp	Team	Pld	W	PW	PL	L	GF	GA	GD	Pts	Qualification
1	A	Stirling Albion	4	3	0	1	0	9	3	+6	10	Qualification for the second round
2	D	Greenock Morton	4	3	0	0	1	11	4	+7	9	Qualification for the second round
3	F	Raith Rovers	4	2	1	1	0	8	5	+3	9	Qualification for the second round
4	C	Hamilton Academical	4	2	1	1	0	7	4	+3	9	
5	E	Dundee	4	3	0	0	1	5	2	+3	9	
6	H	Forfar Athletic	4	3	0	0	1	6	6	0	9	
7	B	Falkirk	4	2	1	0	1	8	5	+3	8	
8	G	Queen of the South	4	2	0	2	0	7	4	+3	8	

Rules for classification: 1) goal difference, 2) goals scored, 3) away goals scored, 4) matches won, 5) away matches won, 6) drawing of lots.
