= Meadowbank, Edinburgh =

Suburb of Edinburgh, Scotland

Coordinates: 55°57′25″N 3°09′32″W

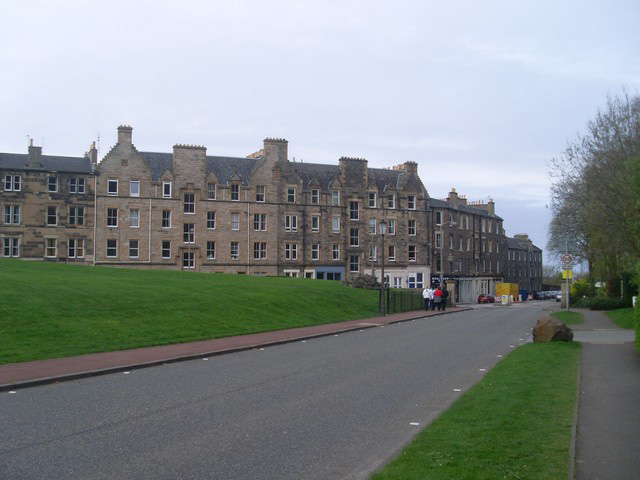
Meadowbank Crescent and Royal Park Terrace

Meadowbank is a suburb of Edinburgh in Scotland. It is best known for Meadowbank Stadium, a multi-purpose sports facility that opened as an international sports stadium in 1970. The stadium closed in 2017 and was redeveloped as a local sports and athletics facility that was officially opened on 4 November 2022.

== History ==
The area developed extensively during the Victorian era as Edinburgh expanded eastwards. Holyrood Park lies to the south of Meadowbank. Meadowbank lodge is a Category C listed lodge, built in 1858, that borders the park and Meadowbank.

Meadowbank Parish Church is named for the Meadowbank area although is located in Abbeyhill. The church was originally called Hollyrood Abbey Church. It is Category B listed and was built in 1899.

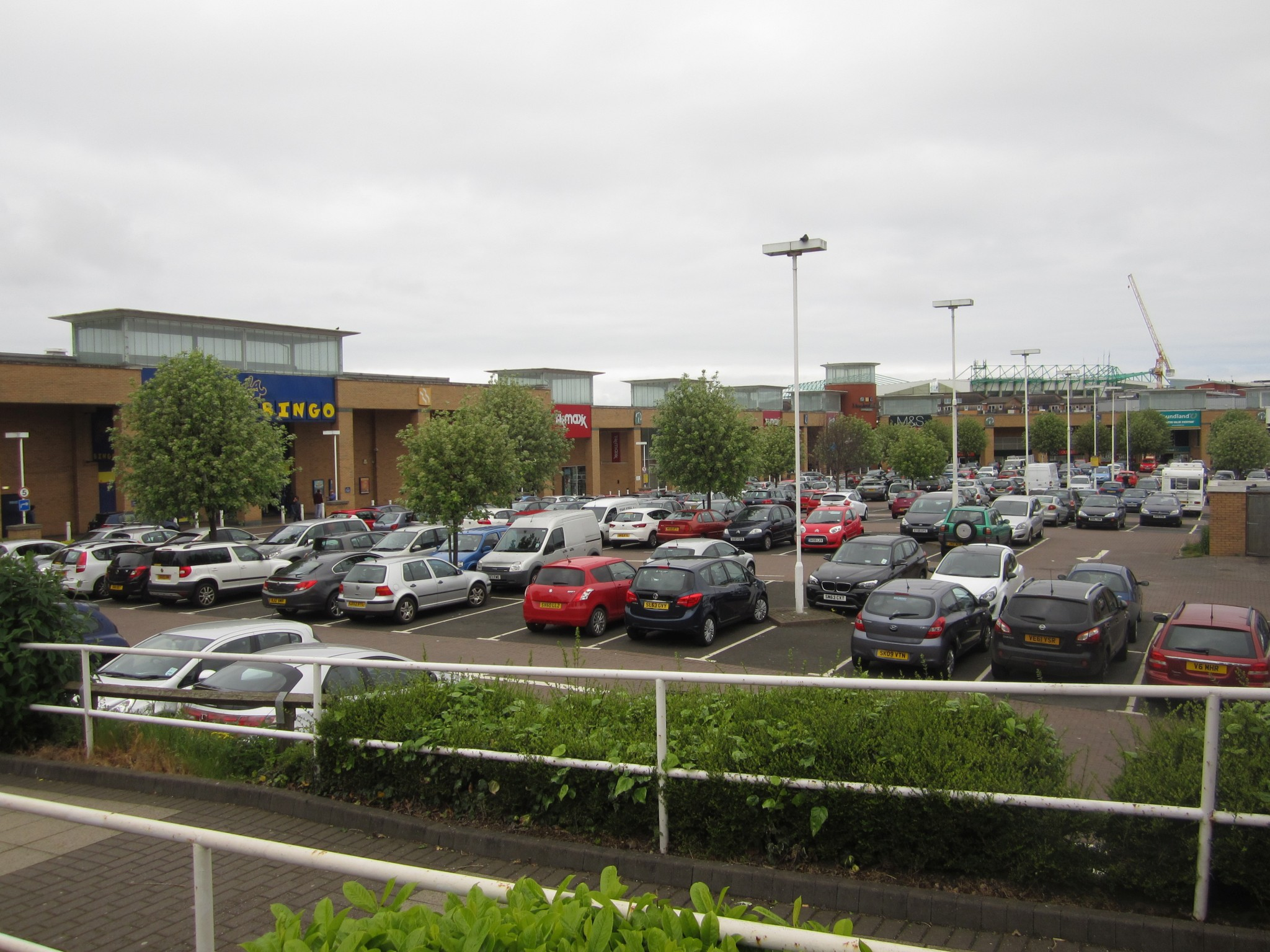
Meadowbank retail park

Meadowbank retail park lies on the western edge of Meadowbank. The retail park was built in the early 1990s and occupies the former site of a foundry on London Road and a former seven storey Malt house.

== Geography ==
Meadowbank lies to the east of central Edinburgh, bordering Abbeyhill on its western side. To the north of Meadowbank is Lochend and Restalrig. To the east of Meadowbank are the areas of Parsons Green, Jock's Lodge and Piershill.

== Transport ==
The A1 road and East Coast Main Line railway to England run through this way.

There were two former train stations in Meadowbank, but these no longer exist. Meadowbank Stadium railway station served the adjacent stadium from 1986 beginning with the 1986 Commonwealth Games. It remained in use until 1998.

=== Queen's Station ===
The Queen's Station was a private railway station used by Queen Victoria to enable her to reach Holyrood Palace, without the need to travel through the Old Town. The station was established in 1850 by the North British Railway and ceased used sometime after 1881. On 29 August 1851, Queen Victoria arrived at the station and was met by a large military escort and crowds.

== Notable residents ==
Duncan Shaw, a former Moderator of the General Assembly of the Church of Scotland grew up in a tenement flat in Meadowbank.
