= Meadowbank Stadium =

Stadium in Edinburgh, Scotland

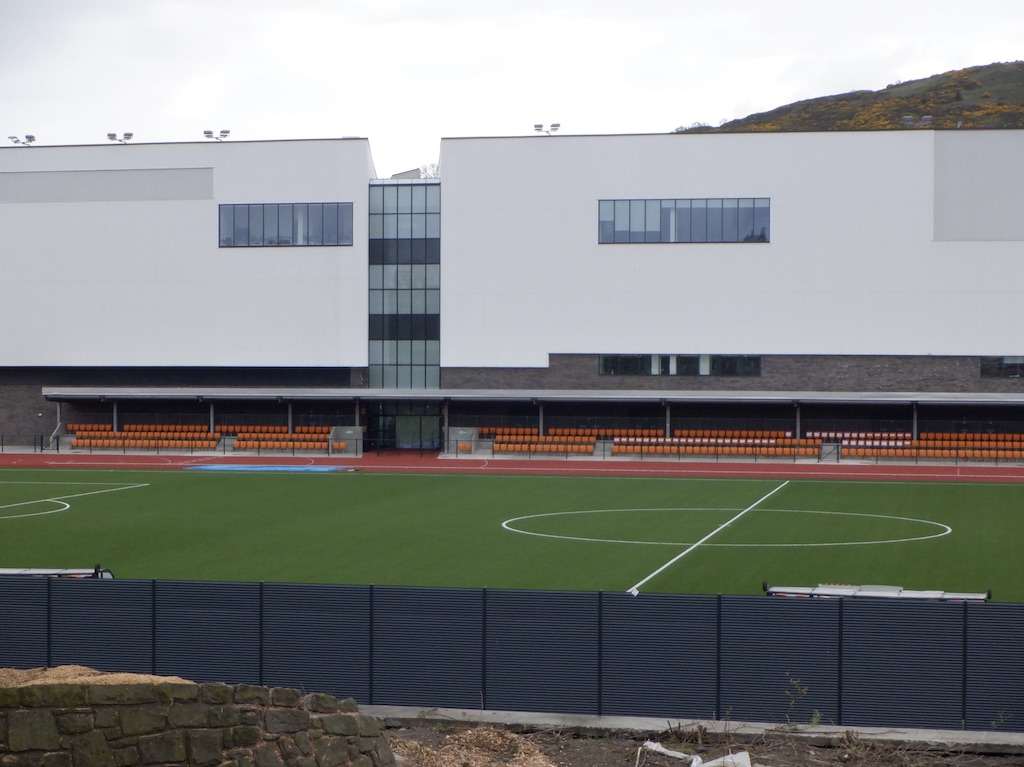
- Redeveloped Meadowbank's pitch, track and small stand in front of indoor sport facility (2023)

- Location within the City of Edinburgh council area
- Former names: New Meadowbank, Old Meadowbank
- Location: Meadowbank, Edinburgh, Scotland
- Coordinates: 55°57′25″N 3°9′31″W
- Seating type: Individual backed seats in stand, bench seats all other areas
- Capacity: 1,320 (500 seated)
- Type: Outdoor Sports / Concert Stadium

Construction
- Built: 1967–1970
- Opened: 1970; 56 years ago
- Renovated: 1994, 1999, 2017–2022

Tenants
- Meadowbank Thistle F.C. (1974–1995); Edinburgh City (1996–2017; 2022–); Edinburgh Rugby (2002–2004); Leith Athletic F.C. (3G pitch, 2013–2017; 2022–); Hibernian W.F.C. (2022–)

Website
- Edinburgh Leisure

Meadowbank Stadium (officially the Meadowbank Sports Centre) is a multi-purpose sports facility located in the Meadowbank area of Edinburgh, Scotland. Built on the site of the earlier New Meadowbank and Old Meadowbank sports venues, it was originally built to host the 1970 Commonwealth Games. It also hosted the Games in 1986, becoming the first venue to host the Games twice. It is the current home of Scottish League Two side Edinburgh City.

The stadium has also regularly hosted football. It was the home ground of Scottish Football League team Meadowbank Thistle between 1974 and 1995, becoming the first all-seated football ground in the UK in the process, and subsequently hosted senior non-league football as the home ground of Edinburgh City. League football returned to Meadowbank in 2016 following City's promotion to the Scottish Professional Football League. The Meadowbank complex also hosts Leith Athletic, who first played on the Meadowbank 3G artificial pitch adjacent to the main stadium between 2013 and 2017.

In 2017 the complex was closed ahead of the demolition of the stadium in the early months of 2019 and work beginning on construction of its replacement. In 2022, following the completion of construction, Edinburgh City and Leith Athletic returned to Meadowbank, where they were joined by Hibernian Women's FC.

Meadowbank Stadium was also used for rugby union as the home venue of Edinburgh Rugby between 2002 and 2004.

== Layout ==
The stadium has a single stand with a capacity of 500. Before the stadium was closed for redevelopment work in 2017, the capacity of the stadium was 5,000.

== Uses ==
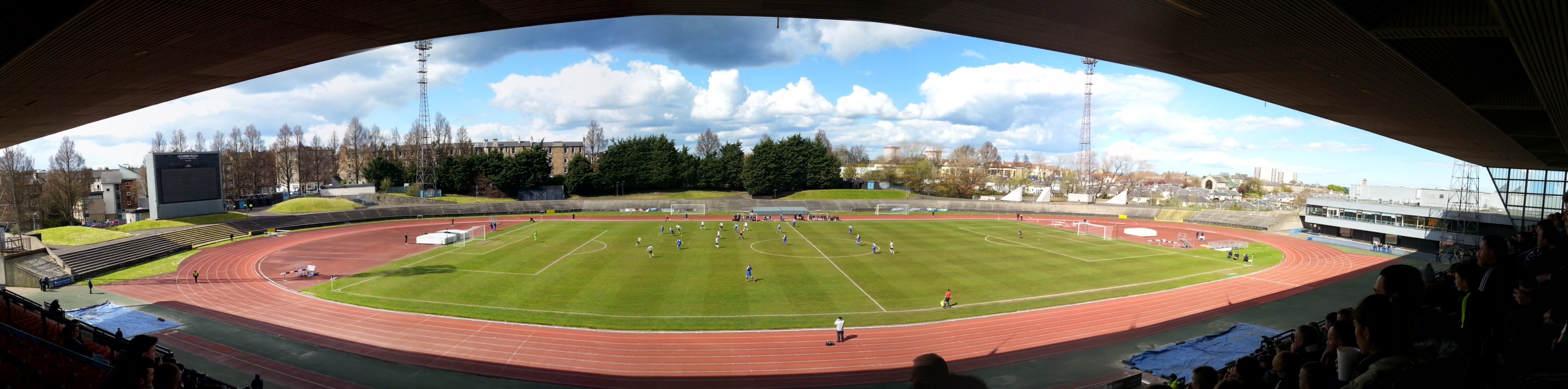
View of football match from Meadowbank's original stand

=== Commonwealth Games ===
Meadowbank Stadium was built for the 1970 Commonwealth Games, at a cost of £2.8 million. It was opened by Prince Edward, Duke of Kent on 2 May 1970. The 1970 Games was one of the most successful in the history of the event. The 1986 Commonwealth Games were also held at Meadowbank, which became the first venue to host the Commonwealth Games twice. The 1986 Games suffered a financial deficit and were widely boycotted due to the support of the British Government for the apartheid regime in South Africa.

The stadium once had its own railway station which was built for the 1986 Commonwealth Games.

The stadium hosted its inaugural Commonwealth Youth Games in August 2000.

=== Football ===
Meadowbank Thistle played at the stadium from 1974. It was often cited as one of the worst grounds used in the Scottish Football League due to the lack of atmosphere, caused by the stadium having a capacity of 5,000 but Meadowbank typically attracting crowds of less than 1,000; most fans were located on one side of the ground, while the running track created a great distance between the fans and the pitch. Meadowbank Thistle announced their intention to leave the stadium and relocate to the new town of Livingston in 1995, when their lease expired. Their last game as Meadowbank Thistle was played in May 1995, although they continued to play at Meadowbank Stadium as Livingston until their new Almondvale Stadium was ready in November of that year.

Edinburgh City moved into the stadium after Meadowbank left – their first fixture there as an SPFL club in July 2016 happened to be against Livingston in the Scottish League Cup – and they were joined there by Leith Athletic (from the East of Scotland League). Hibernian have also played some of their reserve team matches at Meadowbank.

Edinburgh City moved back into Meadowbank in July 2022 after it reopened, along with the Hibernian women's team.

=== Music ===
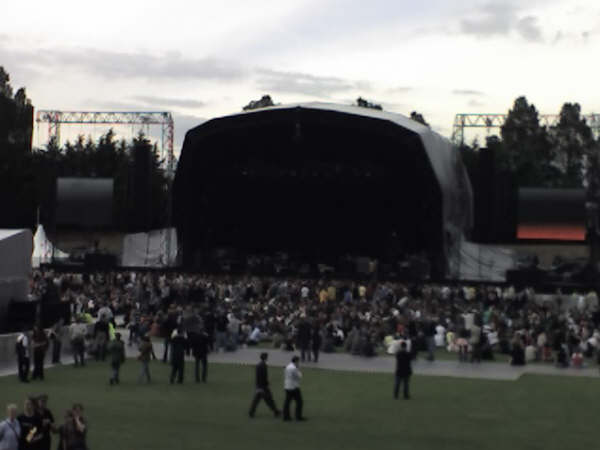
Meadowbank Stadium prior to performance by Radiohead at the 2006 T on the Fringe, taken from the main seating area

Meadowbank was used as a 25,000 capacity concert venue during T on the Fringe, an annual music festival. Muse, My Chemical Romance, Snow Patrol, Radiohead, Pixies, Foo Fighters, Nine Inch Nails, Kaiser Chiefs and Razorlight all played the venue between 2005 and 2007. In 2008, T on the Fringe was renamed The Edge Festival and the stadium was no longer used as one of the main venues.

In 1989, Simple Minds played Meadowbank on their Street Fighting Years Tour after switching from Murrayfield. The switch was due to the band's passionate anti-apartheid beliefs clashing with the Scottish Rugby Union's decision to play in South Africa at the time.

=== Rifle ===
Meadowbank housed both a 10-metre airgun range and a 50metre indoor range for smallbore rifle shooting in the 1970s and 1980s. The range was closed in 1990 but refurbished in 2014 ahead of the 2014 Commonwealth Games in Glasgow for use as a training venue by Scottish Target Shooting's High Performance Squad. The range remained in use until the site's closure in 2017. The new Meadowbank plans do not include facilities for target sports despite Edinburgh athlete Seonaid McIntosh having earned one of TeamGB's first quota places to the 2020 Summer Olympics.

=== Basketball ===
Meadowbank stadium had basketball facilities in three of its large halls, but they were only rarely available to the public.

Edinburgh Rocks basketball team used one of the large halls until they moved to the Braehead Arena, and were renamed Scottish Rocks.

=== Track cycling ===
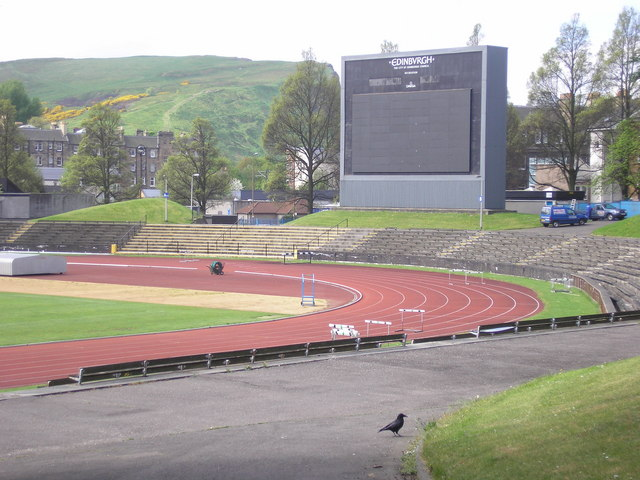
Meadowbank Stadium track

Meadowbank velodrome was home to the East of Scotland regional track cycling academy. The 250-metre track made of African timber was built by Schuermann Architects of Germany for the 1986 Commonwealth Games. It was the home track of Chris Hoy and Craig MacLean. Proposals published in December 2013 suggested that the velodrome be sold off for housing to fund the redevelopment of the main stadium. Usage of the track declined over the years – mainly due to the construction of the Commonwealth Arena and Sir Chris Hoy Velodrome, which is a track of a much better standard. A local bicycle club, Edinburgh Road Club, continued to host some events on the old track until it was finally closed on Saturday 2 September 2017

=== Rugby ===
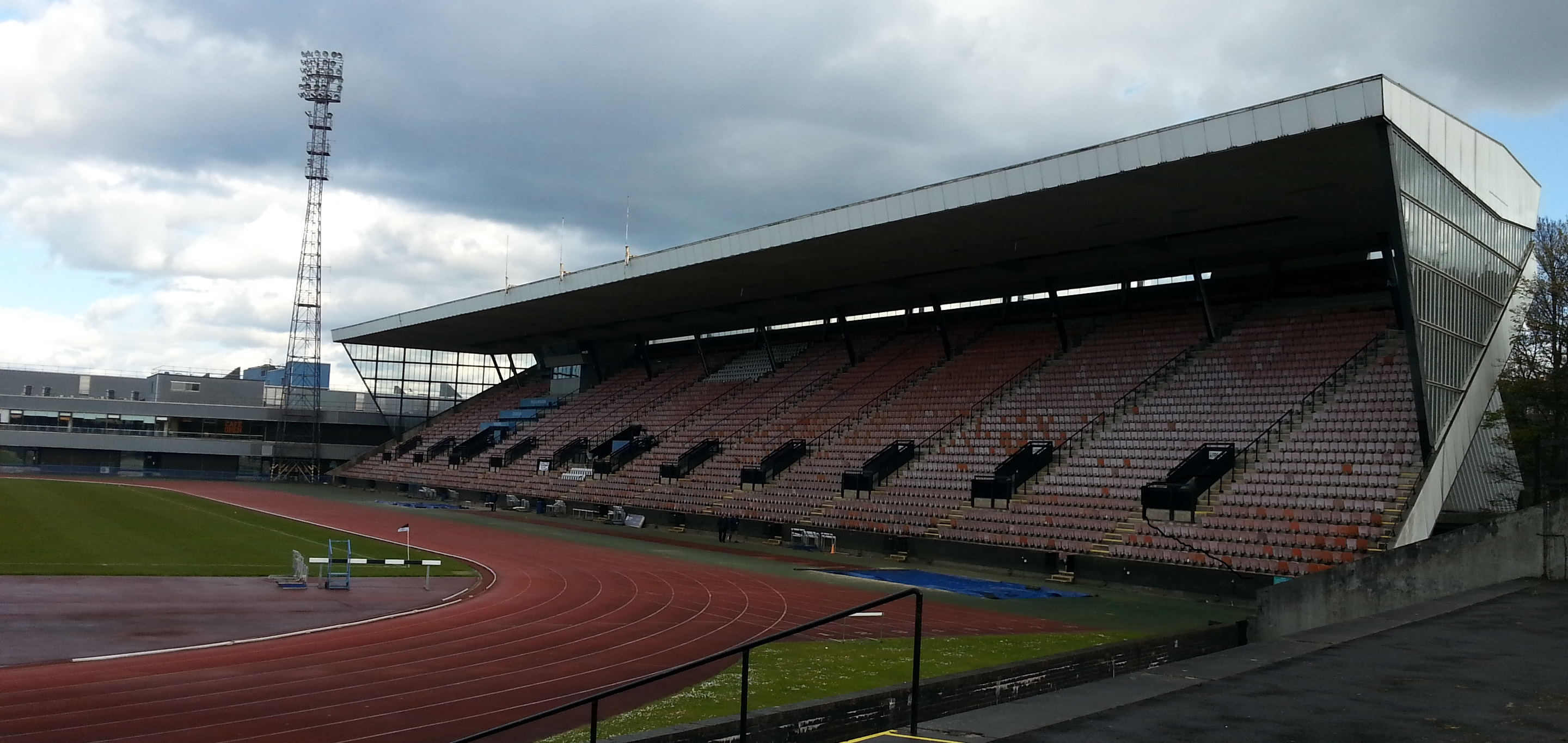
Old Meadowbank Stadium

Professional rugby union club Edinburgh Gunners used the venue from 2002 until they moved to Murrayfield Stadium in 2004.

=== Boxing ===
The Meadowbank Stadium was used for many boxing events, Hall 1 was the location for fighters including Alex Arthur, Ricky Burns etc. It was last used on 14 April 2012 when Arthur staged his self-promoted "Homecoming" fight event for the return of Craig McEwan to Edinburgh.

=== Taekwondo ===
The stadium was used in November 2014 to host the Commonwealth Taekwondo Championships.

=== Juggling ===
Meadowbank was the venue for the European Juggling Convention in 1998.

=== Snooker ===
The sports centre welcomed the professional World Snooker Tour for the 2022 Scottish Open, after the tournament lost its traditional home in Glasgow. The venue will be the tournaments’ open for the next few years.

== Redevelopment and renovation ==
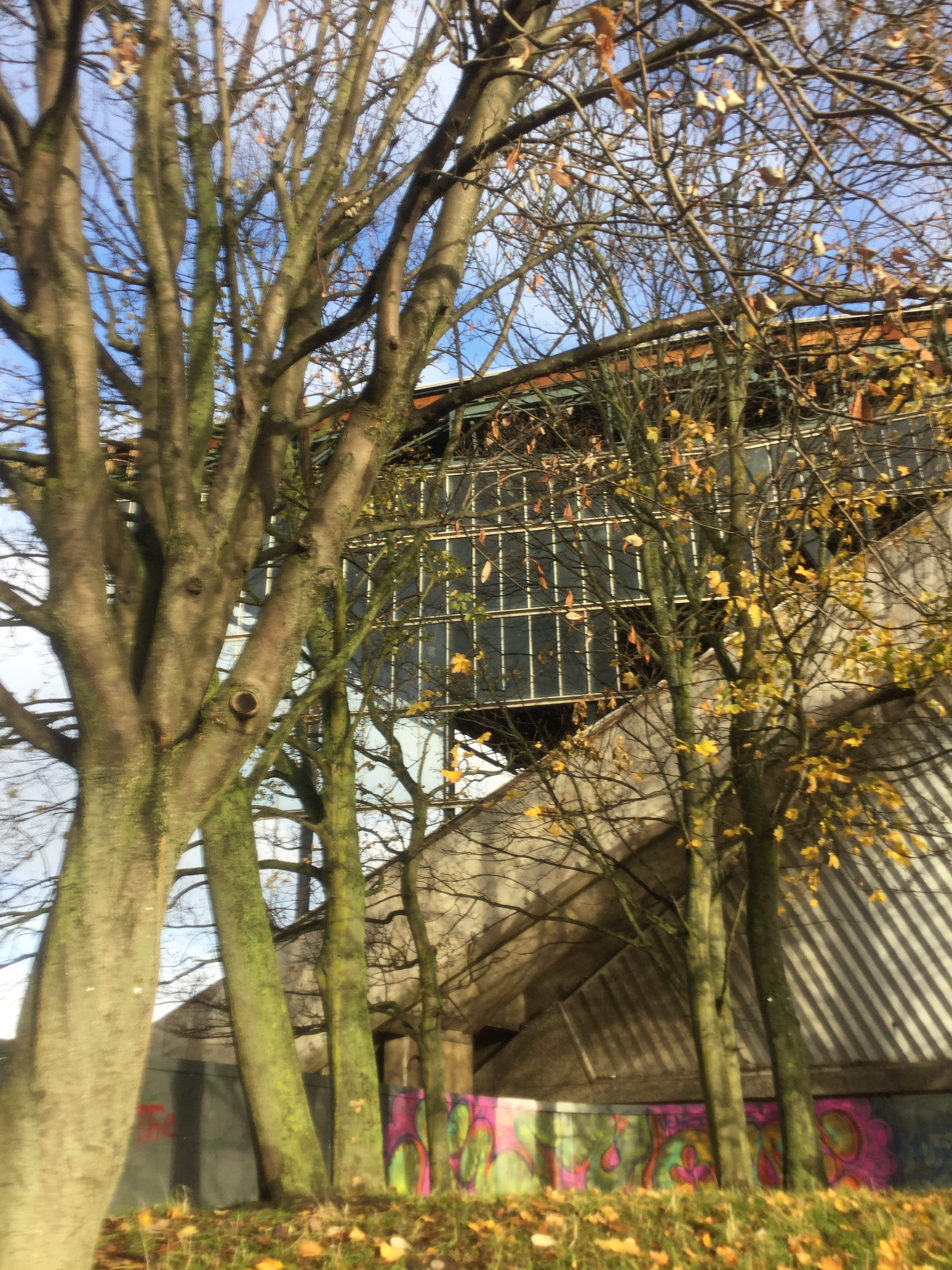
Threatened trees outside at Edinburgh's dilapidated Meadowbank Stadium in November 2018

In 2006 the City of Edinburgh Council published plans to demolish Meadowbank Stadium, selling the site for housing. Meadowbank would have been replaced with a smaller community facility on the east side of the city and a stadium for athletics and rugby was to be built to the west of the city, probably in Sighthill. The draft Meadowbank Development Brief was approved by the council on 7 December 2006 for consultation.

The Development Brief stated that "housing is the most appropriate alternative use of the site" and that "high density development is acceptable in principle". The consultation ran until 28 March 2007, after which the council leader Ewan Aitken admitted that the council should have consulted more with the users of Meadowbank. More than 6000 people signed a petition objecting to the proposal, while 600 marched from the stadium to the City Chambers, as part of a Save Meadowbank campaign. The proposal was cast into doubt due to problems with the Sighthill Stadium project, which was scrapped in 2007. On 13 March 2008, Edinburgh Council voted to sell the land that is occupied by Meadowbank stadium and build a smaller sports facility on east of the site. X-Factor winner Leon Jackson, who was campaigning to save Meadowbank, played at its annual fireworks display on 5 November 2008. The proposals to sell Meadowbank were put on hold in 2009, after a decline in Edinburgh land prices.

In February 2013, the City of Edinburgh Council started a new consultation process about its future. Three options for redeveloping Meadowbank were put forward for consideration by Edinburgh Council in December 2013. A planned design was made public in November 2016. Work was expected to begin after the 2016–17 football season ended. Edinburgh City reached an agreement with Spartans to use their Ainslie Park ground for three seasons while Meadowbank was being redeveloped. A final annual fireworks display was held on 5 November 2017.

The stadium was closed for the redevelopment works in December 2017, and the new facilities were due to open in the spring of 2020. Planning applications for detailed approval for the new sports centre and in principle for development of the rest of the site were published in January 2018.

In July 2018, the Council approved detailed plans for the new Meadowbank Sports Centre and the redevelopment of land surrounding it for housing, student accommodation, hotel and commercial use. A council consultation opened on 20 August 2018 and closed on 31 October. Work began in 2019 and was completed by 2021, and Edinburgh City announced in March 2021 that they would return to Meadowbank for the 2021–22 football season. This did not happen due to ongoing works at Meadowbank, and Edinburgh City stayed at Ainslie Park for another year.

== Gallery ==
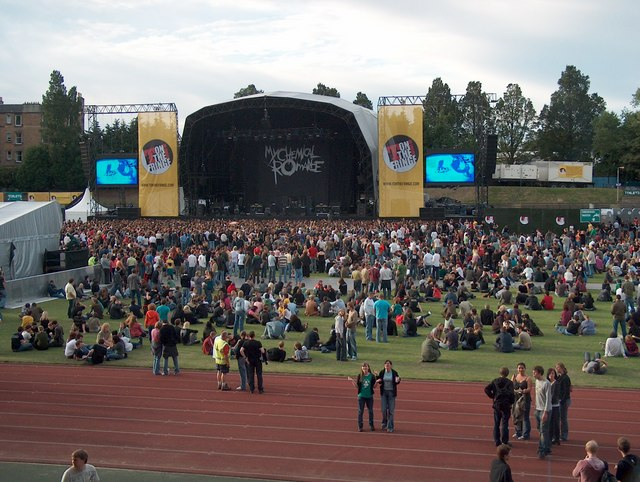
Concert at the Meadowbank Stadium - geograph.org.uk - 1641057

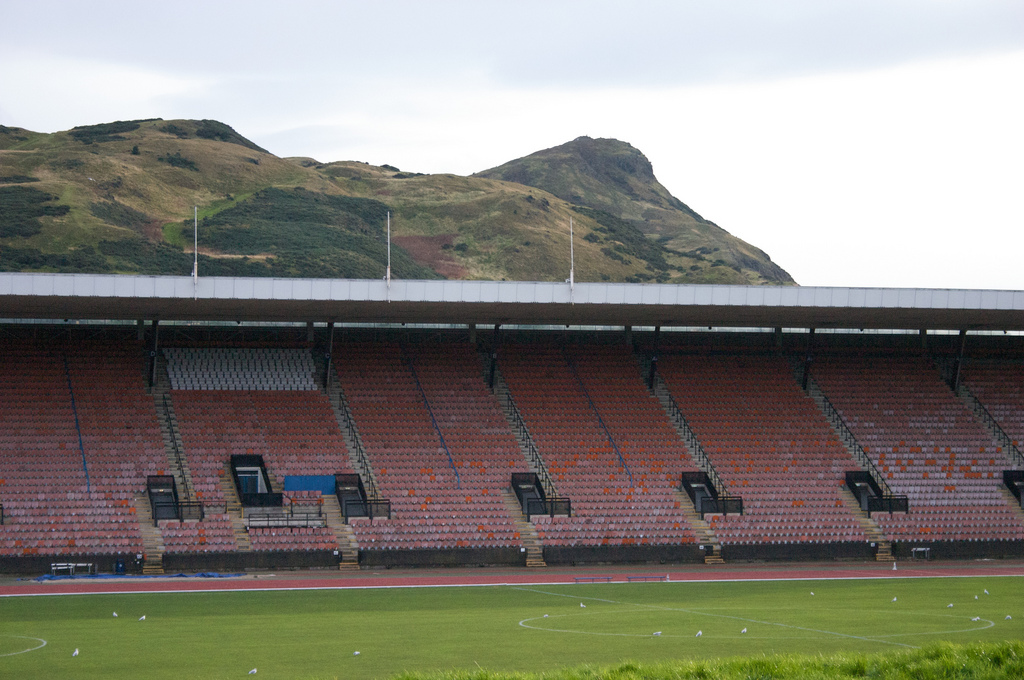
Meadowbank Stadium main stand

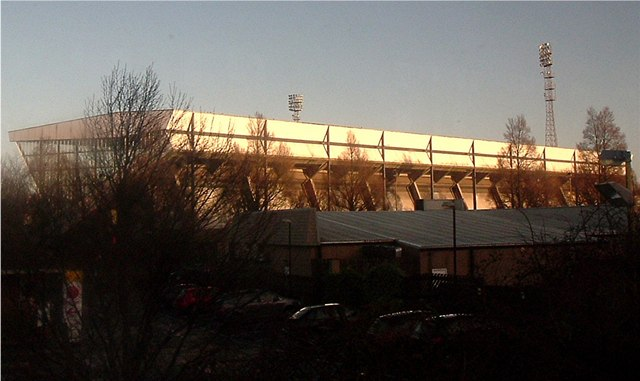
Meadowbank Stadium. - geograph.org.uk - 301834

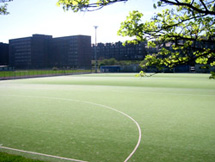
Meadowbank-5aside-215

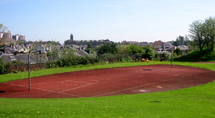
Meadowbank-basketball-215

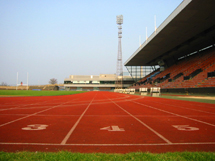
Meadowbank-track-215

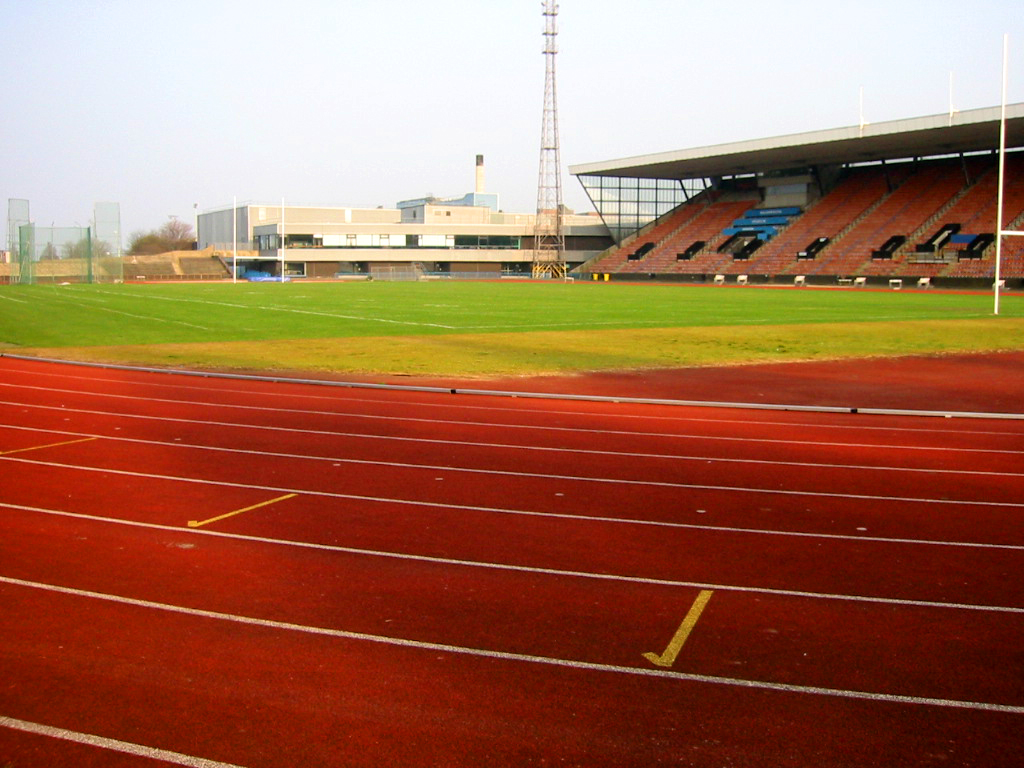
Meadowbank-track-and-field

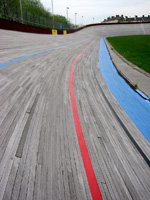
Velodrome-150

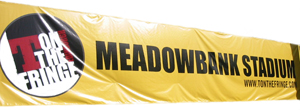
T-on-the fringe-300

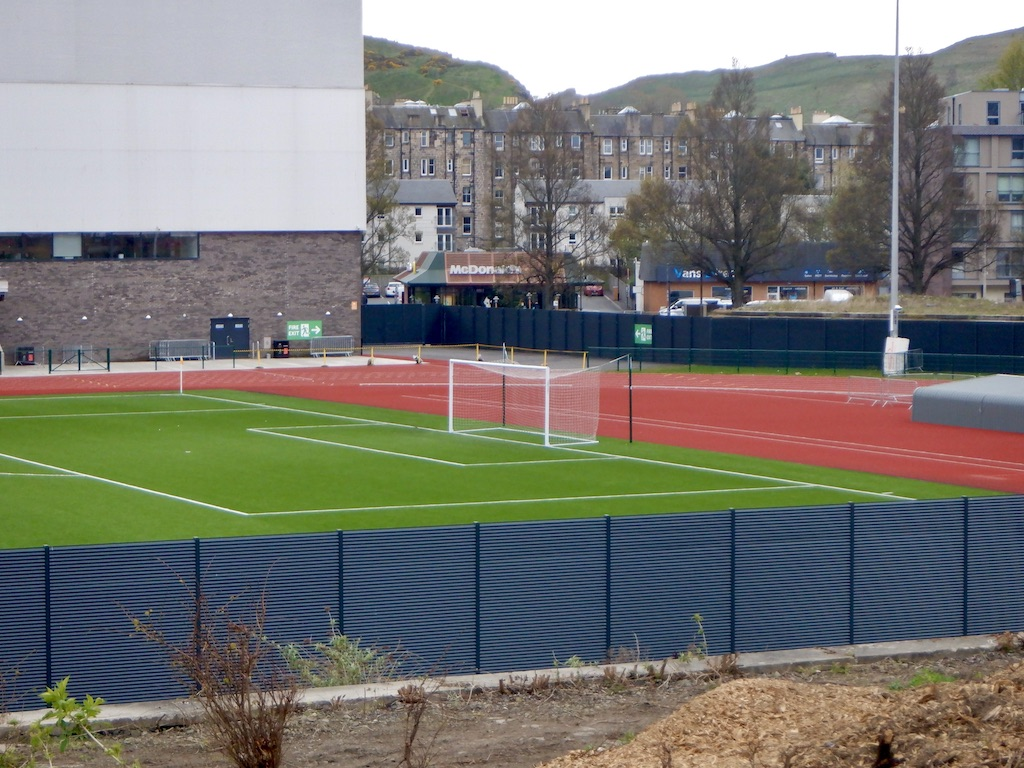
View of redeveloped stadium (west end) from north, 2023

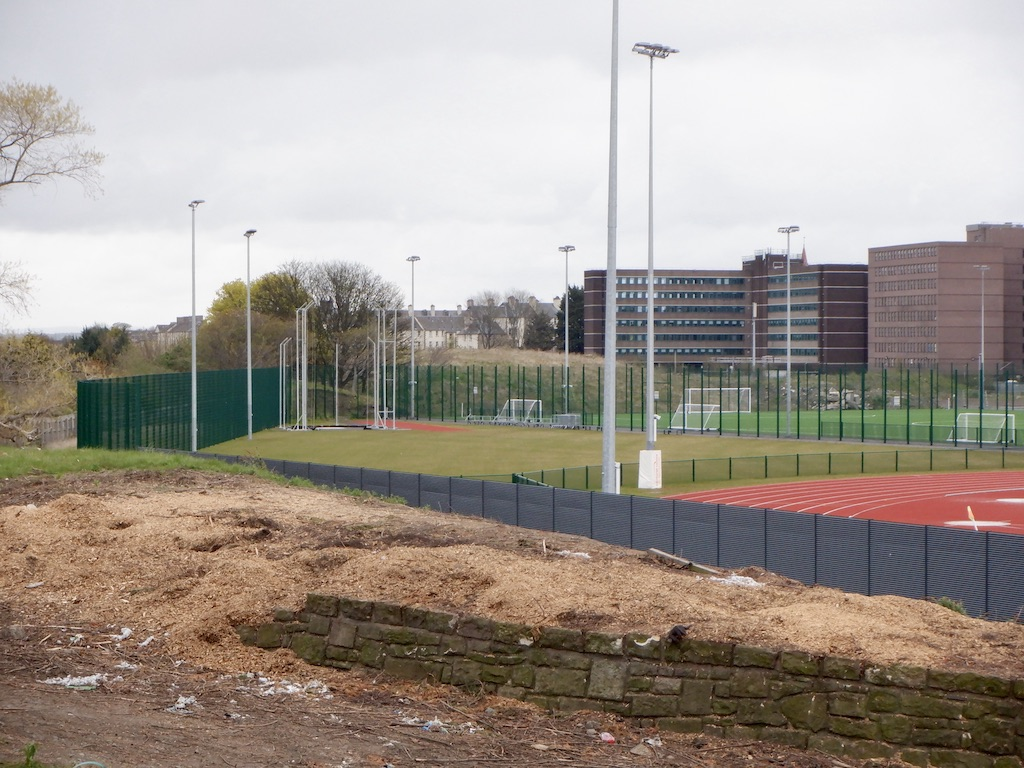
View of redeveloped stadium (east end) from north, 2023

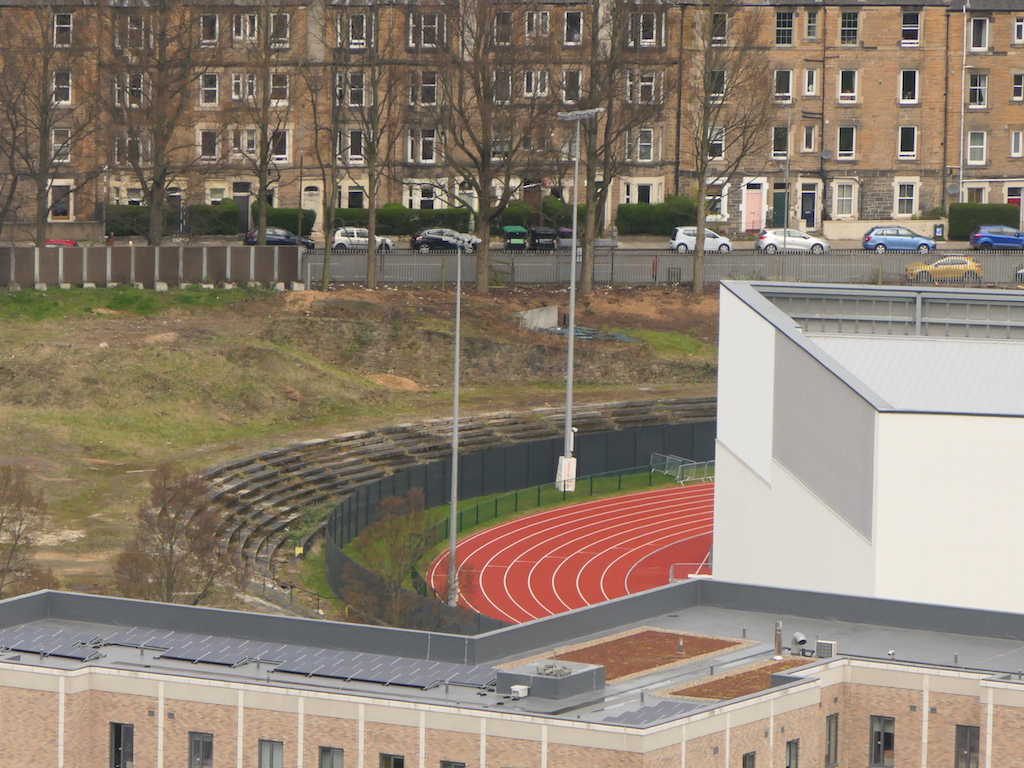
Remains of the original benching at west end of the redeveloped track, 2023

== See also ==
- List of Commonwealth Games venues
- Stadium relocations in Scottish football
