= Angus derby =

Football rivalry in Scotland

Angus Derby
- Location: Angus, Scotland
- Teams: Arbroath; Montrose; Forfar Athletic; Brechin City
- First meeting: 3 October 1885; Arbroath 9–1 Forfar Athletic; 1885–86 Scottish Cup 2nd round
- Latest meeting: 26 August 2025; Montrose 1–0 Forfar Athletic; 2025–26 Scottish Challenge Cup

Statistics
- Total meetings: 874 (As of 26 August 2025)
- Most wins: Forfar Athletic (186)
- All-time record: Forfar Athletic (186); Arbroath (173); Brechin City (156); Montrose (153); Draw (206)
- Location of the clubs' stadia

The Angus derby is a football rivalry that is based in Angus, Scotland. Matches are contested between any two SPFL clubs from Arbroath, Montrose, Forfar Athletic and Brechin City. All four sides regularly compete within the same leagues and therefore often face each other, and it is rare to find a season without a matchup between at least two of the Angus teams.

== History ==
=== Entry into the SFL ===
Arbroath and Forfar were both admitted into the Scottish Football League in the 1921–22 season entering the new reformed Second Division, expanded from the old pre war division. Brechin and Montrose joined 2 years later in 1923–24 with the newly formed third division. The division only lasted for 2 full years, however, before being scrapped due to financial difficulties.

Brechin and Montrose would both return to the SFL in 1929–30 following the departures of Bathgate and Arthurlie in the previous season. This marked the first year in which all 4 clubs competed in the same division which continued until Arbroath's promotion to the top flight in 1935 where they remained until the leagues were halted for WW2.

=== Post-war return ===
When the league resumed in the 1946–47 season Forfar, Montrose and Brechin found themselves in the new C Division (a reconstituted Third Division) of the league which mostly featured reserve teams for clubs in the top 2 divisions. Arbroath continued to play in a higher league than their rivals in the second tier of Scottish football. Forfar only spent 3 seasons in the third tier winning the C Division title and promotion in 1948–49. The next year the league was split into 2 regional sections with Brechin and Montrose placed in the North East section. Both clubs remained in this set-up for the next 5 years until Brechin City won the North East section in 1953—54 and were promoted to the second tier. The next year Montrose (along with the other non - reserve sides) were promoted despite finishing 8th in their section as the division was abolished.

In 1955–56 the 4 Angus clubs were again all in the same division. Aside from Arbroath's brief spells in the top flight this would remain the same until 1974–75.

=== League Reconstruction ===
At the end of the 1974–75 season the Scottish Football League went from 2 large divisions (18 and 20 teams) to 3 smaller divisions (10, 14 and 14 teams). Arbroath and Montrose both found themselves in the second tier of Scottish football while Brechin and Forfar were relegated to the third tier along with the other clubs that made up the bottom 14 of the 1974–75 second tier. Montrose were relegated to the third tier in 1979 and Arbroath followed them the next year so in 1980–81 the clubs were again together in the third tier in Scottish football. Brechin won the title in 1982–83 and were promoted back to the second tier and Forfar did the same the following year and then Montrose did the same again the next year. Arbroath were left as the sole Angus side in the bottom tier for 2 seasons until Brechin and Montrose were relegated in 1987. Brechin won the league again in 1989–90 a point ahead of Kilmarnock and were promoted. They were relegated straight back down the next year at the same time as Montrose were promoted. Like Brechin though, Montrose came straight back down along with Forfar. 1992–93 saw Brechin win promotion again with the 4 rivals in the same league.

=== 4 divisions ===
The leagues were again restructured at the end of the 1993–94 season into 4 leagues of 10. Montrose, Forfar and Arbroath all finished in the bottom 8 in the 14 team third tier and so were relegated to create the fourth tier (along with Inverness CT and Ross County) with Brechin in the league above.

The creation of more smaller leagues meant the clubs were never all in the same league as each other but it did bring more titles for the Angus clubs.

Forfar won the first ever Third Division title and Montrose were also promoted to the third tier as runners up, but both came straight back down the following year. Forfar immediately won promotion again the next season in 96/97 but Montrose would spend the next 22 seasons in the basement division.

Like Forfar, Brechin also had a turbulent start in the new league system with multiple promotions and relegations in the first decade following the reconstruction, but both clubs eventually found their level in the third tier where they have since played the majority of their football. Meanwhile, Arbroath have mostly yo-yoed between the third and fourth tiers as well as a couple of spells in the second tier but have found consistency hard to come by. Since they were first promoted back to the third tier in 1998 the club have not spent any more than 3 consecutive seasons at any given level before being promoted or relegated.

=== Recent events ===
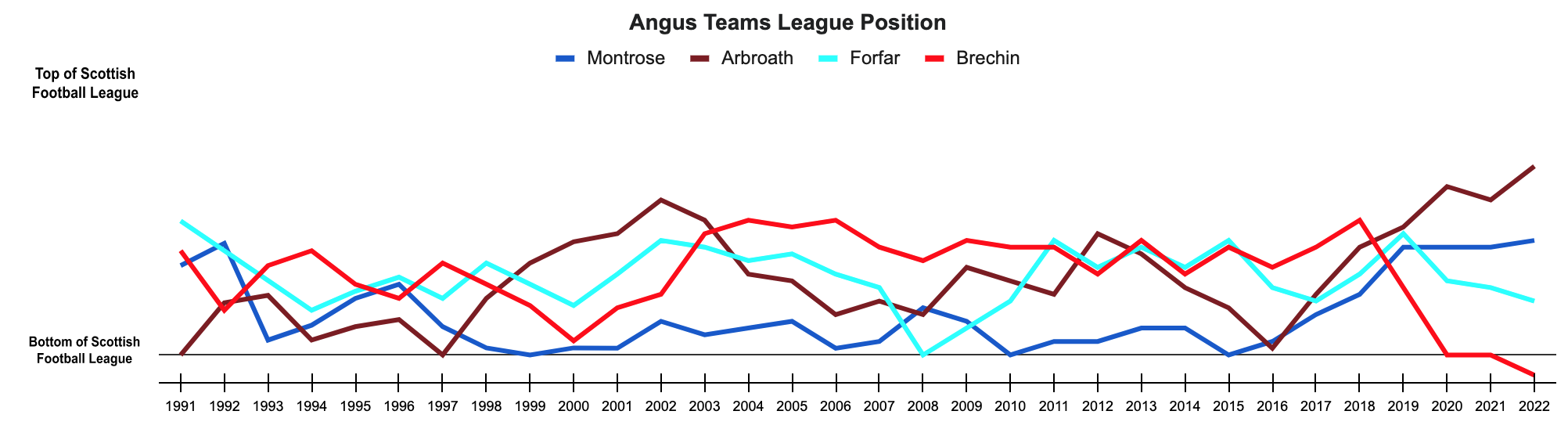
Angus teams league positions since the 1990–91 season

Arbroath won League Two in 2016–17 and Forfar were also promoted to League One via the play-offs after finishing runners-up to their rivals.

Montrose won the title the following season ending a record 22-year run in the fourth tier. Brechin had gained promotion to the Championship in 2016-17 for the third time since 1994 but like their previous 2 campaigns they finished bottom and were relegated back down, this time after a winless season.

Montrose's promotion coupled with Brechin's relegation meant the 2018–19 League One season would see all 4 clubs in the same league for the first time since the 4-league system was introduced. Arbroath won the league and promotion to the Championship while Forfar and Montrose qualified for the playoffs but failed to win promotion. In contrast, Brechin finished bottom again and suffered their second successive relegation. The following season, Brechin found themselves bottom of League Two but were spared the recently introduced Pyramid Play-off as the season was curtailed due to the coronavirus pandemic.

In 2021, Brechin City were relegated from the SPFL after finishing bottom of their league for the fourth year in a row. The League Two play-off (introduced in 2014–15) pitted the bottom placed side of League Two against the winner of a playoff between the Lowland League and Highland League Champions. Brechin were defeated by Lowland League champions, Kelty Hearts and were relegated to the Highland League (as Brechin is North of the Tay Bridge line of latitude), ending over 90 years of the Angus club's participation in the national leagues. Brechin became the third club to be relegated from the SPFL.

In the 2023–24 Scottish League Cup group stage, Arbroath, Montrose and Forfar were all drawn in the same group. Despite being in lower leagues than both Arbroath and Montrose, Forfar won both matchups with their rivals in the group, with Arbroath getting the win over Montrose.

== Arbroath vs Montrose ==
- First meeting: 22 September 1888, 1888–89 Scottish Cup
- Next meeting: To be confirmed.

This is traditionally the fiercest and most anticipated of the Angus derbies. The most recent meeting between the two teams was in the Scottish League One in April 2025, with Arbroath winning 1–0. The teams often compete in the same league, but as of 2025 Arbroath play in the Scottish Championship, the league above Montrose. They most recently met in a Scottish League One match at Links Park, where Arbroath equalised late to take a 1–1 draw against a ten-man Montrose.

Despite the relatively smaller scale of the two teams, the intense nature of the rivalry has led to several clashes between supporters over the years.

Some examples of players who have played for both sides include Simon Murray and Ian Stewart (who also managed both teams and played for all 4 Angus sides).

As of: 5 April 2025

Competition (Note: Does not include unofficial wartime competitions, or regional tournaments like the Fife Cup.)	GP	ARB	Dr	MNT	ARBG	MNTG
League (Note: Includes matches in different divisions, and from the different eras: SFL, SPL, SPFL.)	134	59	34	41	227	172
Scottish Cup	10	4	3	3	18	13
League Cup	5	4	0	1	16	3
Challenge Cup	1	1	0	0	3	0
Total	150	68	37	45	264	188

== Arbroath vs Forfar ==
- First meeting: 3 October 1885, 1885–86 Scottish Cup
- Next meeting: To be confirmed.

These two sides have also often shared the same league, and compete with each other often for either promotion or survival. Two of the most significant games in the history of the fixture came in the 2009–10 Scottish Second Division Play-offs, where after a first leg goalless draw at Gayfield, Forfar came out in the 2nd leg as 2–0 winners and would take Arbroath's place in the 2010–11 Scottish Second Division. They most recently met in the 2025–26 Scottish League Cup group stage, where League Two Forfar defeated Championship Arbroath in a 1–0 home win.

As of: 26 July 2025

Competition	GP	ARB	Dr	FOR	ARBG	FORG
League	140 (Note: Includes two matches in the 2010 playoffs (0–0, Forfar 2–0 Arbroath).)	53	38	49	261	223
Scottish Cup	5	4	0	1	20	7
League Cup	11	4	2	5	15	15
Challenge Cup	4	2	0	2	7	7
Total	160	63	40	57	303	252

== Forfar vs Montrose ==
- First meeting: 7 September 1889, 1889–90 Scottish Cup
- Next meeting: To be confirmed.

The towns of Forfar and Montrose are nearly 18 miles apart, making them the furthest apart of any of the Angus sides. They most recently met in the 2025–26 Scottish Challenge Cup league phase, with Montrose winning 1–0 at home to Forfar.

As of: 26 August 2025

Competition	GP	FOR	Dr	MNT	FORG	MNTG
League	135	56	28	51	247	241
Scottish Cup	3	2	0	1	7	8
League Cup	10	6	2	2	24	15
Challenge Cup	3	1	0	2	2	3
Total	150	65	30	56	280	267

== Brechin vs Montrose ==
- First meeting: 30 January 1924, 1923–24 Scottish Division Three
- Next meeting: To be confirmed.

At just 9 miles apart, these teams are the closest of any of the Angus sides, and the two share a very even rivalry. Meetings between the pair have been rare in recent years due to the clubs rarely competing in the same division. Montrose have spent the vast majority of their time in the fourth tier of Scottish football since its inception in 1994 while Brechin have mostly been playing in the third and sometimes second tier, though of late Montrose have been the higher up of the two. Their most recent encounter came in 2019 in the group stages of the League Cup, where the teams drew 1–1 at Glebe Park, with Montrose winning the bonus point through a penalty shoot-out.

As of: 2019–20 Scottish League Cup group stage

Competition	GP	BRE	Dr	MNT	BREG	MNTG
League	117	49	19	49	190	191
Scottish Cup	8	3	3	2	15	14
League Cup	4	1	2	1	6	6
Challenge Cup	1	1	0	0	2	1
Total	130	54	24	52	213	212

== Brechin vs Arbroath ==
- First meeting: 30 January 1930, 1929–30 Scottish Division Two
- Next meeting: To be confirmed.

The least played of any of the Angus derbies, the two sides are separated by 14 miles. Their most recent matchup occurred at the end of the 2018–19 season in the Scottish League One and proved to be hugely consequential for both sides. The game, which finished 1–1, gave Arbroath enough points to be declared champions which saw them promoted to the Scottish Championship (the 2nd tier of Scottish football) for the first time since 2003. For Brechin meanwhile, the result continued a downward spiral for the club that led to them suffering their second consecutive relegation.

As of: end of 2018–19 season

Competition	GP	BRE	Dr	ARB	BREG	ARBG
League	100	37	27	36	155	162
Scottish Cup	5	2	1	2	6	6
League Cup	3	0	0	3	2	8
Challenge Cup	1	0	0	1	1	2
Total	109	39	28	42	164	178

== Brechin vs Forfar ==
- First meeting: 30 January 1926, 1925–26 Scottish Division Three
- Next meeting: To be confirmed.

This is the most played of any of the Angus derbies, as both sides have traditionally remained as close to each other in leagues as they are geographically, being separated by just over 13 miles. They most recently met in the League Cup group stages in 2019, where Forfar ran out 3–0 winners at Station Park.

As of: 2019–20 Scottish League Cup group stage

Competition	GP	BRE	Dr	FOR	BREG	FORG
League	151	54	38	59	224	250
Scottish Cup	7	2	3	2	13	15
League Cup	16	7	6	3	26	24
Total	174	63	47	64	263	289

== Totals for four teams ==
As of: 26 August 2025

Competition	GP	ARB	BRE	FOR	MNT	Dr	ARBG	BREG	FORG	MNTG
League	777	148	140	164	141	184	650	569	720	604
Scottish Cup	38	10	7	5	6	10	44	34	29	35
League Cup	49	11	8	14	4	12	39	34	63	24
Challenge Cup	10	4	1	3	2	0	12	3	9	4
Total	874	173	156	186	153	206	745	640	821	667
Total goals:							2,873			

== Achievements by Angus clubs ==
Club	Top tier seasons	Scottish League (level 1)			Scottish League (level 2)			Scottish League (level 3)		Scottish League (level 4)		Highland League (level 5)		Scottish Cup		League Cup		Challenge Cup	
Club	Top tier seasons	W	RU	3rd	W	RU	3rd	W	RU	W	RU	W	RU	W	RU	W	RU	W	RU
Arbroath	9	0	0	0	0	5	6	1	2	2	2	0	0	0	0	0	0	0	0
Brechin City	0	0	0	0	0	0	0	3	2	1	1	1	1	0	0	0	0	0	1
Forfar Athletic	0	0	0	0	0	0	0	1	0	1	3	0	0	0	0	0	0	0	0
Montrose	0	0	0	0	0	0	2	1	1	1	1	0	0	0	0	0	0	0	0
