= Scott McLaren (British Army soldier) =

British Army soldier

- Born: 31 January 1991; Edinburgh, Scotland
- Died: 4 July 2011 (aged 20); Nahr-e-Saraj, Helmand Province, Afghanistan
- Military career
- Allegiance: United Kingdom
- Branch: British Army
- Service years: 2009–2011 †
- Rank: Highlander
- Unit: 4th Battalion Royal Regiment of Scotland

Highlander Scott McLaren (31 January 1991 – 4 July 2011) was a British infanteer from the 4th Battalion of the Royal Regiment of Scotland who went out on his own from a secure base in the Nahr-e-Saraj district of Helmand Province, Afghanistan. His body was found later that day. He had been brutally killed by the Taliban and the reason for McLaren's disappearance away from the base has been the subject of much speculation.

== Background ==
McLaren, who was from Sighthill in Edinburgh, had joined the British Army in August 2009 and after initial infantry training at Catterick, he was posted to B Company, 4 Scots who were based at Bad Fallingbostel in Germany at that time. His fellow infanteers nicknamed him F1 on account of his athletic prowess and also as a reference to his surname.

McLaren deployed to Afghanistan with the 4th Battalion as a Rifleman in April 2011. His section was attached to the 1st Battalion Battlegroup and on the 3 July 2011 this group deployed to Checkpoint Salaang in the Nahr-e-Saraj district of Helmand Province.

== Disappearance and death ==
Whilst they were at a smaller vehicle checkpoint 330 feet (100 m) north of Checkpoint Salaang on the 3 July 2011, a colleague of McLaren's had left behind some night-vision goggles. When they withdrew to the safety of the base, the missing goggles were highlighted and McLaren was the last person to see them. Later that night, at 2:19 am (local time) on the 4 July, McLaren left the base on his own ostensibly to search for the missing kit. It was noted that he had talked about going back for the goggles.

McLaren's absence was formally registered at 4:00 am (local time) and sparked a massive manhunt that drew in friendly forces from outside of the UK military sphere. McLaren's disappearance coincided with a visit to Afghanistan by the then British Prime Minister David Cameron. Cameron was quoted as saying "throw everything you have got at trying to pick up this young man", rather than being taken of a tour around the district.

Despite an intensive 17-hour search, Highlander McLaren was found dead in a nearby river 3 miles (4.8 km) from the base. He had been tortured, shot five times in the head with a semi-automatic rifle and after death, his body had been interfered with. His body was repatriated to the United Kingdom on the 12 July 2011 through RAF Lyneham accompanied by the usual cortege through the streets of Wootton Bassett. McLaren's funeral was held at Mortonhall Crematorium in Edinburgh on the 26 July 2011.

McLaren's death brought the total of British military deaths to 375 since operations began in 2001.

== Inquest and allegations of abuse ==
At the inquest deciding how Highlander McLaren died, Wiltshire and Swindon coroner David Ridley said "I am satisfied beyond reasonable doubt that Scott was captured by insurgent forces and ultimately was executed by insurgent forces on the morning of July 4; therefore, for those reasons, the conclusion I am going to record is that Scott McLaren was unlawfully killed while on active service in Afghanistan."

When McLaren left the base (an event that was not observed by the guards at the camp gates) CCTV captured him as he walked south. His route to the vehicle check point should have taken him north over a canal bridge. It has not been properly explained as to why McLaren went in the opposite direction which led him into a Taliban held area known as "The Heart of Darkness".

An Afghan Army General claimed that McLaren had gone swimming with two ANA troops, was separated and drowned with the Taliban abusing his body when they found it. The Taliban claim that he was taken hostage but was killed during a firefight. Both these scenarios were denied outright by military authorities with emphasis on the second being that no fighting was recorded in the area at the time of McLaren's capture.

In September 2015, when the campaign to have Sergeant Alexander Blackman released from prison was being vaunted in the press, McLaren's mother, Ann McLaren, petitioned the imprisoned Marine to reveal what he knew about her son's death. At his murder trial he declined to answer questions about McLaren's death in order to avoid any further anguish to the family. On the day of McLaren's disappearance, he had been instructed to get his team on the ground and start searching, initially without clear orders as to why, but later being told that there was a 'Man Away' scenario.

The family claim that McLaren was subject to abuse and bullying for being quiet, shy and an outsider. When he left the base in July 2011, he packed all his possessions into his kit bag and "snuck past" the guards. Hours before he left, he had been seen in tears studying a map of the district. The family also said that his military friends have told them that he was being bullied.

McLaren's father, James, said that the truth was inconvenient for the army; pointing out that if his son could get out of the base undetected, someone could get in. He also said that the typical wait for a service family to have an inquest into a death would be two years; his son's inquest came after only 5 months.
