= Ian Stewart (Scottish footballer) =

Scottish footballer and manager

Personal information
- Position: Winger

Youth career
- Perth Celtic

Senior career*
Years	Team	Apps	(Gls)
1964–1965	Arbroath	9	(3)
1965–1966	Dundee United	1	(1)
1966–1967	Arbroath	6	(0)
1967–1974	Forfar Athletic	162	(37)
1974–1978	Montrose	109	(20)
1978–1980	Brechin City	17	(1)
1983–1987	Montrose	2	(0)
Total		306	(62)

Managerial career
- 1978–1980: Brechin City
- 1980–1983: Arbroath
- 1983–1990: Montrose
- * Club domestic league appearances and goals

Ian Stewart (born 1946) is a Scottish former football player and manager.

Stewart worked as a civil servant while being involved in football on a part-time basis. He was player/manager of Brechin City in the late 1970s, but left that position in January 1980 to become manager of Arbroath. Stewart was sacked by Arbroath in November 1983, despite losing only 39 out of 132 league matches in charge. Arbroath had narrowly missed out on promotion in each of the previous two seasons.

Soon after leaving Arbroath, he was appointed manager of Montrose. He guided Montrose to promotion in 1984–85. He made a surprising appearances as a player for Montrose in September 1984, aged 38, when two players were unable to travel to an away match against Berwick Rangers. Montrose produced a surprise victory against Hearts at Tynecastle in a 1986–87 Scottish League Cup tie. It was the first time any visiting team had won at Tynecastle in fifteen months.
