= Sighthill Stadium =

Sports venue in City of Edinburgh, Scotland

Coordinates: 55.9258°N 3.2854°W

Sighthill Stadium was a proposed stadium to be located in the Sighthill district of Edinburgh, Scotland. It would have been a multi-use stadium hosting a number of sports, principally athletics and rugby. Edinburgh Rugby were considered key potential tenants. In the published plans the new stadium was due to replace Meadowbank Stadium, which would have been sold off for housing. The scheme ran into difficulties due to opposition to the sale of Meadowbank.
