= Meadowbank Stadium railway station =

Closed railway station in Edinburgh, Scotland

Coordinates: 55.9579°N 3.1577°W

Meadowbank Stadium

General information
- Location: Edinburgh; Scotland
- Platforms: 1

Other information
- Status: Disused

History
- Original company: British Rail

Key dates
- 14 June 1986: Station opened
- 1988: Station closed
Location

Meadowbank Stadium railway station was opened on 14 June 1986 by British Rail next to Meadowbank Stadium in Edinburgh to allow spectators to travel to the 1986 Commonwealth Games that were being held at the stadium. A shuttle service ran from Edinburgh Waverley: at most times this consisted of a single train running at 20–30 minute intervals, but at times of high demand a second train was used and frequencies were higher. These operated from platforms 20 and 21 at Edinburgh Waverley, and a temporary ticket office nearby was the only outlet at which tickets could be bought. Special pre-printed Edmondson tickets were issued at a flat fare of £0.50.

The station continued to be used for occasional events until 1988, when it closed. The railway line is still there although the tracks nearest to the platform have been lifted. The platform and ramp are still there, but all fixtures and fittings have been removed and the station is now almost completely overgrown. The line linking it directly to Waverley via Abbeyhill has also been lifted, although trains can still access it by reversing at Piershill Junction.
