= Sighthill, Edinburgh =

Suburb of Edinburgh, Scotland

Coordinates: 55°55′19.09″N 3°17′12.25″W

Sighthill is a suburb in the west of Edinburgh, Scotland. The area is bordered by Broomhouse and Parkhead to the east, South Gyle to the north, the industrial suburb of Bankhead and the Calders neighbourhood to the west, and Wester Hailes to the south. It is sometimes included in the Wester Hailes area, while the Calders, Bankhead and Parkhead are sometimes considered parts of Sighthill. Administratively it has formed a core part of the City of Edinburgh Council's Sighthill/Gorgie ward since 2007.

== New development ==
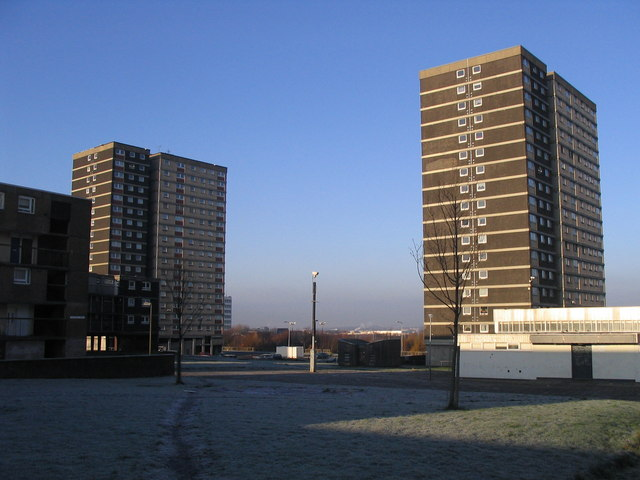
Two of Sighthill's high rise blocks in 2007

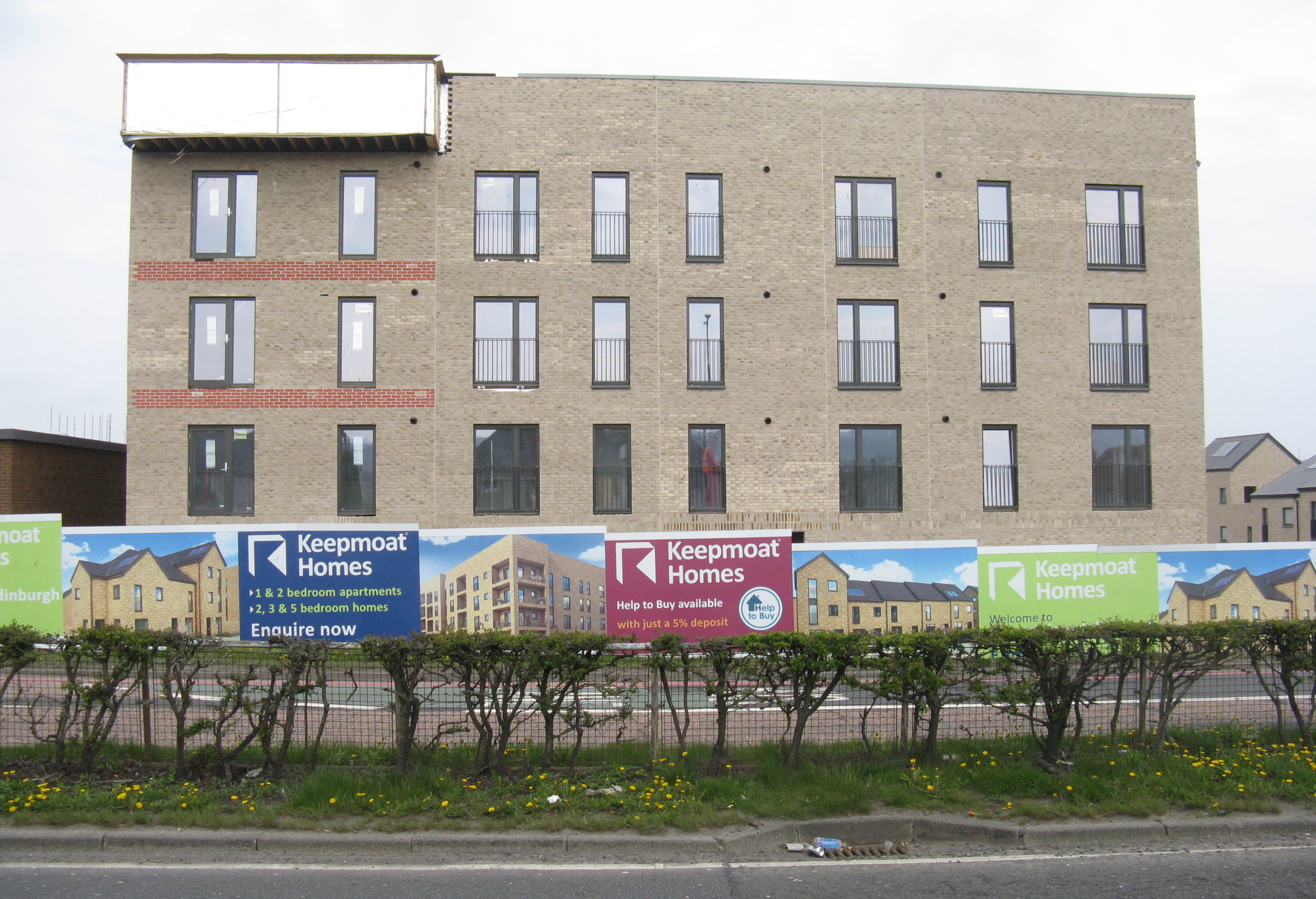
Example of replacement housing, 2019

For nearly 50 years, the skyline of western Edinburgh was dominated by four high rise residential tower blocks in northern Sighthill (Broomview House, Glenalmond Court, Hermiston Court and Weir Court).

The 11-storey 'slab' block Broomview House was demolished on Sunday 21 September 2008 by Safedem. The flats came down at 11:15 am in a controlled explosion where a longstanding former resident pushed the ceremonial button to implode the building. The remaining three 16-storey blocks were demolished on Sunday 25 September 2011, also at 11:15 am. All of the remaining low-rise council-built properties in the vicinity were also demolished over the next few years. Plans for a new development called Broomview by Keepmoat were approved in 2016, (not to be confused with the same company's slightly later Northbridge project in Sighthill, Glasgow, also regenerating a high-rise estate) and construction work was completed by 2020; some of the designs were later nominated for national awards. To the north of this new housing is the area's public park.

The older, southern part of Sighthill consists mainly of cottage flat (four-in-a-block) homes, and has remained relatively unchanged since its construction in the late 1940s along with neighbouring Parkhead.

== Amenities ==
=== Education ===
Edinburgh College (formerly Stevenson) and Edinburgh Napier University's Sighthill Campuses (formerly Stevenson College and the Edinburgh Business College respectively) are based here.

=== Healthcare, firefighting, retail and library services ===
There are a medical centre and a fire station. There are a public library and some shops. The Health centre was one of the first modern Health clinics in the UK (the other was in Cardiff) as a trial to see if it worked (before this, doctors made house visits to the patients' homes).

=== Transport ===
The Calder Road, one of the city's main arteries, runs through Sighthill, around 0.5 miles (0.80 km) from the Edinburgh city bypass (A720) road and the connection with the M8 motorway. The Edinburgh–Dunblane line railway (also connecting to Glasgow Queen Street) is nearby to the north, as is the route of Edinburgh Trams between the city centre and Edinburgh Airport. The Union Canal skirts the area to the south-west.

Lothian Buses provides 14 buses to the area:

- 3 Clovenstone - Wester Hailes - Sighthill - Gorgie - Haymarket - Princes Street - Newington - Gilmerton - Dalkeith -Mayfield
- 21 Clovenstone - Wester Hailes - Sighthill - Corstorphine - Clermiston - Ferry Road - Leith - Lochend - Portobello - Niddrie - Royal Infirmary
- 25 Heriot-Watt University - Sighthill - Gorgie - Haymarket - Princes Street - Leith - Lochend - Restalrig
- 32 Balerno - Currie - Heriot-Watt University - Sighthill - Edinburgh Park - Gyle Centre - Barnton - Cramond
- 33 Westburn - Clovenstone - Westside Plaza - Sighthill - Gorgie - Haymarket - Princes Street - Commonwealth Pool - Royal Infirmary - Sheriffhall P&R - Millerhill
- 34 Heriot-Watt University - Sighthill - Longstone - Slateford - Fountainpark - Lothian Road - Princes Street - Lochend - Leith - Ocean Terminal
- 35 Heriot-Watt University - Sighthill - Slateford - Fountainpark - Bristo Square - Holyrood - Leith - Ocean Terminal
- 36 Gyle Centre - Sighthill - Longstone - Glenlockhart - Morningside - West End - Cannonmills - Bonnington - Leith - Ocean Terminal
- X27 Regent Road - The Exchange - Balgreen - Sighthill - Hermiston - Wilkieston - Calderwood - East Calder - Livingston - Bathgate
- X28 Regent Road - The Exchange - Balgreen - Sighthill - Hermiston - Kirknewton - East Calder - Livingston - Bathgate
- Skylink 400 Edinburgh Airport - Gyle Centre - Sighthill - Wester Hailes - Colinton - Oxgangs - Fairmilehead - Gracemount - Gilmerton - Royal Infirmary - Niddrie - Fort Kinnaird
- N25 Riccarton - Hermiston P&R - Sighthill - Gorgie - Haymarket - Leith Street
- N28 Bathgate - Livingston - East Calder - Wilkieston - Hermiston - Sighthill - Balgreen - The Exchange - Leith Street
- N35 Ocean Terminal - Leith - Holyrood - Bristo Square - Fountainpark - Slateford - Sighthill - Heriot-Watt University

== Demographics ==
=== Ethnicity ===
Ethnic Group	Sighthill / Gorgie (Count)	Sighthill / Gorgie (%)	Edinburgh Total (Count)	Edinburgh % of City Total	SG's Contribution to City Total as %
Scottish	17,789	58.37%	298,538	57.92%	5.96%
Other White British	2,507	8.23%	69,835	13.55%	3.59%
Other White	2,714	8.91%	41,432	8.04%	6.55%
White Polish	1,182	3.88%	16,401	3.18%	7.21%
Chinese, Chinese Scot. or Brit.	695	2.28%	15,062	2.92%	4.61%
Mixed or multiple ethnic group	646	2.12%	12,889	2.50%	5.01%
Indian, Indian Scot. or Brit.	2,008	6.59%	12,400	2.41%	16.19%
White Irish	497	1.63%	10,327	2.00%	4.81%
Other African	781	2.56%	8,648	1.68%	9.03%
Pakistani, Pakistani Scot. or Brit.	463	1.52%	7,429	1.44%	6.23%
Other Asian	416	1.37%	6,440	1.25%	6.46%
Other ethnic group	401	1.32%	5,860	1.14%	6.84%
Arab, Arab Scot. or Arab Brit.	331	1.09%	4,129	0.80%	8.02%
Bangladeshi, Bangl. Scot. or Brit.	325	1.07%	2,672	0.52%	12.16%
Other Caribbean or Black	54	0.18%	868	0.17%	6.22%
African, African Scot. or Brit.	81	0.27%	831	0.16%	9.75%
Caribbean, Carib. Scot. or Brit.	45	0.15%	482	0.09%	9.34%
Gypsy/ Traveller	21	0.07%	255	0.05%	8.24%
Black, Black Scot. or Black Brit.	0	0.00%	76	0.01%	0.00%
TOTAL	30,476	100%	515,474	100%	5.91%

== Film and television location ==
Sighthill has been used as a location for film and television productions. The most notable production to be filmed in Sighthill was the 1998 BBC Scotland television drama Looking After Jo Jo which featured Robert Carlyle in the title role and was filmed in and around North Sighthill and Niddrie. Other notable film and television productions to be filmed in Sighthill include Quite Ugly One Morning starring James Nesbitt and an adaptation of the Christopher Brookmyre novel and Trouble Sleeping - a tale of a Palestinian refugee struggling to survive in the UK. More recently the flats in Sighthill have been used as backdrop for the film Outcast a Celtic supernatural thriller once again starring James Nesbitt and released in 2010.

== Notable residents ==
- Scott McLaren, soldier from 4th Battalion the Royal Regiment of Scotland killed by the Taliban in July 2011
- John Rae, jazz musician
- Jamie Walker, footballer

== See also ==
- Sighthill Stadium
