= History of Edinburgh Zoo =

History of zoo in Edinburgh, Scotland

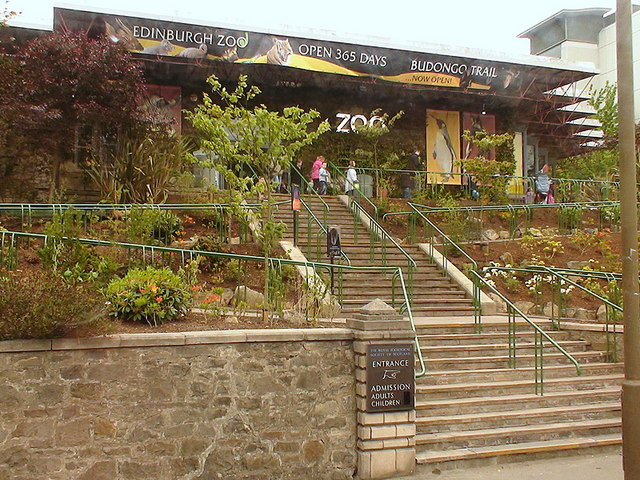
The entrance to Edinburgh Zoo in 2009

Edinburgh Zoo is a zoological park in Corstorphine, Edinburgh, Scotland which opened on 22 July 1913. Edinburgh had previously been home to a zoological garden which failed to thrive. The new zoo is owned and run by the Royal Zoological Society of Scotland and initially opened as the Scottish National Zoological Park. Modern zoological methods allowed animals to survive in Edinburgh's cold climate.

Edinburgh is the only zoo in the United Kingdom to be incorporated by royal charter, and was the first zoo in the world to house and breed penguins. The zoo's penguins have been famous throughout its history, and since the 1950s have performed a daily parade around the park.

The zoo was largely unaffected by war, though some animals were euthanised for safety reasons during the Second World War. After the war the park housed a brown bear named Wojtek who had served with the Polish military. In 1972 one of the zoo's king penguins was adopted by the Norwegian military.

In the 21st century Edinburgh Zoo was briefly forced to close by the 2001 foot-and-mouth outbreak, and in 2005 received threats from the Animal Liberation Front. In 2000 a plan for the complete redevelopment of the zoo was begun.

== Precursors ==
Scotland's first zoo was called The Royal Edinburgh Zoological Gardens, and predated the modern Edinburgh Zoo by some 70 years. After the death of James Donaldson, a wealthy Scottish publisher and bookseller, the gardens of his country house, Broughton Hall (the area now covered by Bellevue) were converted into a zoological park. Occupying a 6-acre (2.4 ha) site, the park was situated about a mile to the north-east of Central Edinburgh, near East Claremont Street. Naturalist John Graham Dalyell was one of the original promoters of the project and eventually president of the board of directors. The Zoological Gardens opened in 1839 with a collection of stock zoo animals including lions, tigers, monkeys, bears and an elephant.

At the time, animals in zoos were typically held in poor conditions in small, cramped cages, and the Zoological Gardens presented no exception. As a result, its animals were frequently afflicted by disease, and also suffered from the harsh easterly winds of the Edinburgh climate. Despite these setbacks, the menagerie attempted to maintain its popularity by putting on concerts, acrobatics shows and displays of fireworks and Montgolfier balloons. Children were carried around the park on the back of the zoo's elephant, giving it a rare opportunity for exercise. Even with these entertainments, the Zoological Gardens were eventually forced to admit defeat. The park was closed and the site developed as tenement flats in 1857. Nothing now remains of the house or its gardens.

== Foundation ==
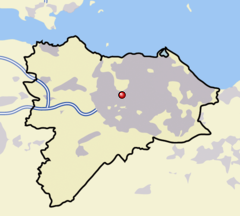
Map showing the location of the zoo's Corstorphine Hill site within Edinburgh

Plan showing the main areas of land owned by the zoo and the dates they were incorporated into the park

Edinburgh Zoo was created by Thomas Haining Gillespie, a solicitor from Dumfries who dreamed of establishing a zoological park in Scotland. At first he was told that tropical animals would never be able to live in a cold climate like Edinburgh's—a view that had to some extent been borne out by the failure of the Royal Zoological Gardens. In 1908, though, he was encouraged to read of the pioneering methods employed by Carl Hagenbeck, which were allowing tropical animals to thrive in the recently opened Tierpark Hagenbeck in Hamburg, Germany.

In 1909, Gillespie and others founded a registered charity which was to become the Royal Zoological Society of Scotland. The Society's first president was lawyer and politician Edward Theodore Salvesen, son of the Norwegian merchant Christian Salveson—a connection which would prove significant in later years. A series of lectures given to the society by J. Arthur Thomson gave yet more momentum to the modern approach being spearheaded by Hagenbeck in Germany.

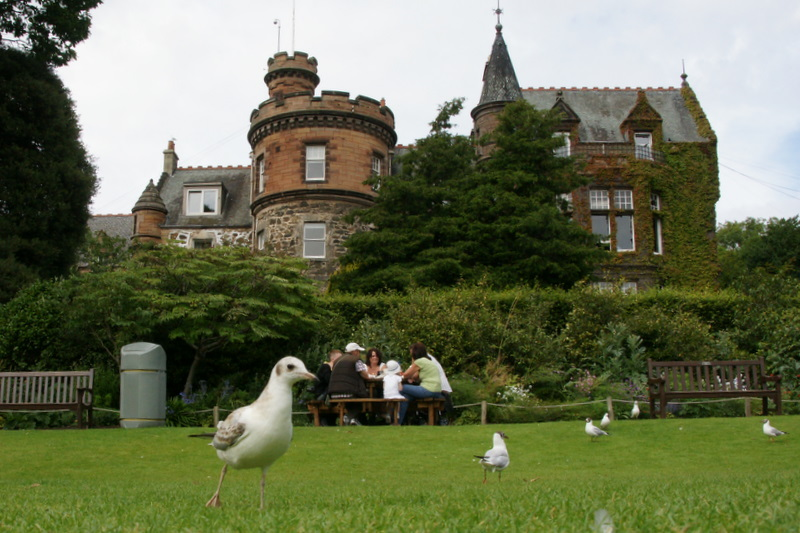
Corstorphine Hill House, in the grounds of which Edinburgh Zoo stands

All that remained was to find a suitable site for the new zoo. Gillespie hoped for a site with plenty of sun and with shelter from the north and east winds. He also intended the zoo to be cheaply and quickly accessible via public transport. The society secured an option to purchase the 75-acre (30 ha) Corstorphine Hill House estate for £17,000. The house had been built in 1793 as the home of Scottish accountant William Keith. Its current Scottish Baronial architecture is mostly thanks to remodelling by the Macmillan family in 1891.

The zoological society found they were having difficulty gathering the necessary funds before the approaching expiry of the purchase option. Edinburgh City Council stepped in, purchasing the site outright in February 1913. The zoological society was granted full use of the estate in return for a 4 percent annual repayment of the cost.

A further £8,000, raised with the help of the society's members, was set aside for the construction and stocking of the park. Initially the zoo occupied only the southernmost 27 acres (11 ha), while the land to the north was used as a golf course. The park was designed by town planner Patrick Geddes and his son-in-law Frank Mears. Following Gillespie's vision, they modeled the park after the open designs of zoos like the New York Zoological Park and Hagenbeck's zoo in Hamburg. These modern zoological parks promoted a more spacious and natural environment for the animals, and stood in stark contrast to the steel cages typical of the menageries built during the Victorian era. The Scottish National Zoological Park, as it was initially called, opened to the public with a large collection of donated and borrowed animals on 22 July 1913, after only 15 weeks of work. The zoo still occupies very much the same area of land today, though the park is being extensively redeveloped.

== Early history ==
In its opening year the zoo was incorporated by royal charter—though it was not granted the use of the "Royal" title until 1948, following a visit by King George VI. As of June 2011 Edinburgh Zoo was the only zoo in Britain with a royal charter. The original charter defined the zoological society's mission as being "to promote, facilitate and encourage the study of zoology and kindred subjects and to foster and develop amongst the people an interest in and knowledge of animal life."

Thanks to the zoological society's connection with the Salvesen family, some of the zoo's first animals were three king penguins, arriving from South Georgia with a Christian Salvesen whaling expedition that docked in Leith in early 1914. They were the first penguins to be seen anywhere in the world outside of the South Atlantic. The zoo successfully hatched the first ever captive king penguin chick in 1919. Penguins continued to arrive with whaling ships for years afterwards. Today, king penguins are perhaps the zoo's most famous animals.

A tropical bird and reptile house was added in 1925, followed by an aquarium, paid for by a grant, in 1927, and an ape house in 1929. The now famous penguin pool was constructed in 1930—though it has since been rebuilt, in 1990, to include a new viewing area. It was in 1928 that the Corstorphine Golf Club finally evacuated the 47 acres (19 ha) to the north of the estate, allowing the zoo to expand significantly. This new area of the park was again designed by Mears, along with his partner Carus-Wilson, and was completed in 1937.

Hagenbeck's modern zoo techniques proved effective, and Edinburgh quickly gained a reputation for its good animal conditions. 1934 saw the births in captivity of a sea lion and beaver, and in 1936 a baby chimpanzee followed. A litter of wolves was born in 1938, and soon afterwards the first orangutan to be born in Britain.

== War years ==
Edinburgh Zoo was bombed twice during the Second World War, but remained mostly unharmed. One of the bombs, in around 1940, was reported to have killed a giraffe. Nevertheless, Edinburgh was, like all zoos in Britain, affected by the war. Since bombs could fall at any time, it was not considered safe to keep dangerous animals that might escape if their enclosures were damaged. In 1941 the recently born wolves had therefore to be euthanized, along with a collection of dangerous snakes, to guard against any possible danger to the public. Despite the war the zoo continued to grow, with land to the east being purchased in 1942 and construction of a lake beginning soon afterwards.

== Post-war era ==
Gillespie retired from his post as director in 1950. In 1956 he was succeeded by Gilbert Fisher, who took over as director-secretary of the Zoological Society and effectively gained control of the zoo.

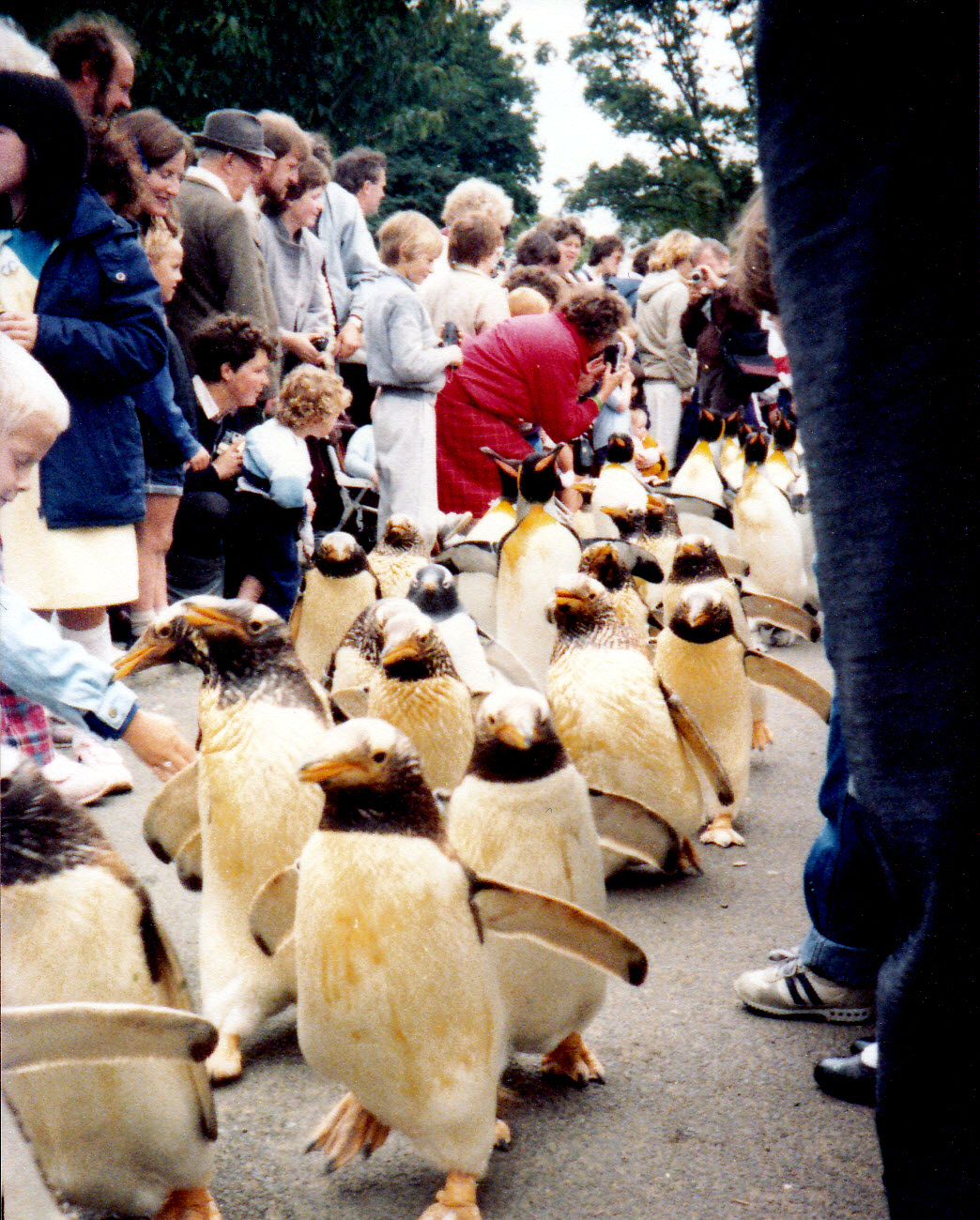
The penguin parade in 1985

It was around this time that Edinburgh Zoo's now famous Penguin Parade was established. A zookeeper accidentally left a gate to the penguin pool open, and was followed around the zoo by a train of penguins. Visitors were so delighted with the procession that it became a regular occurrence, and today around two-thirds of the zoo's penguins parade round the park every day.

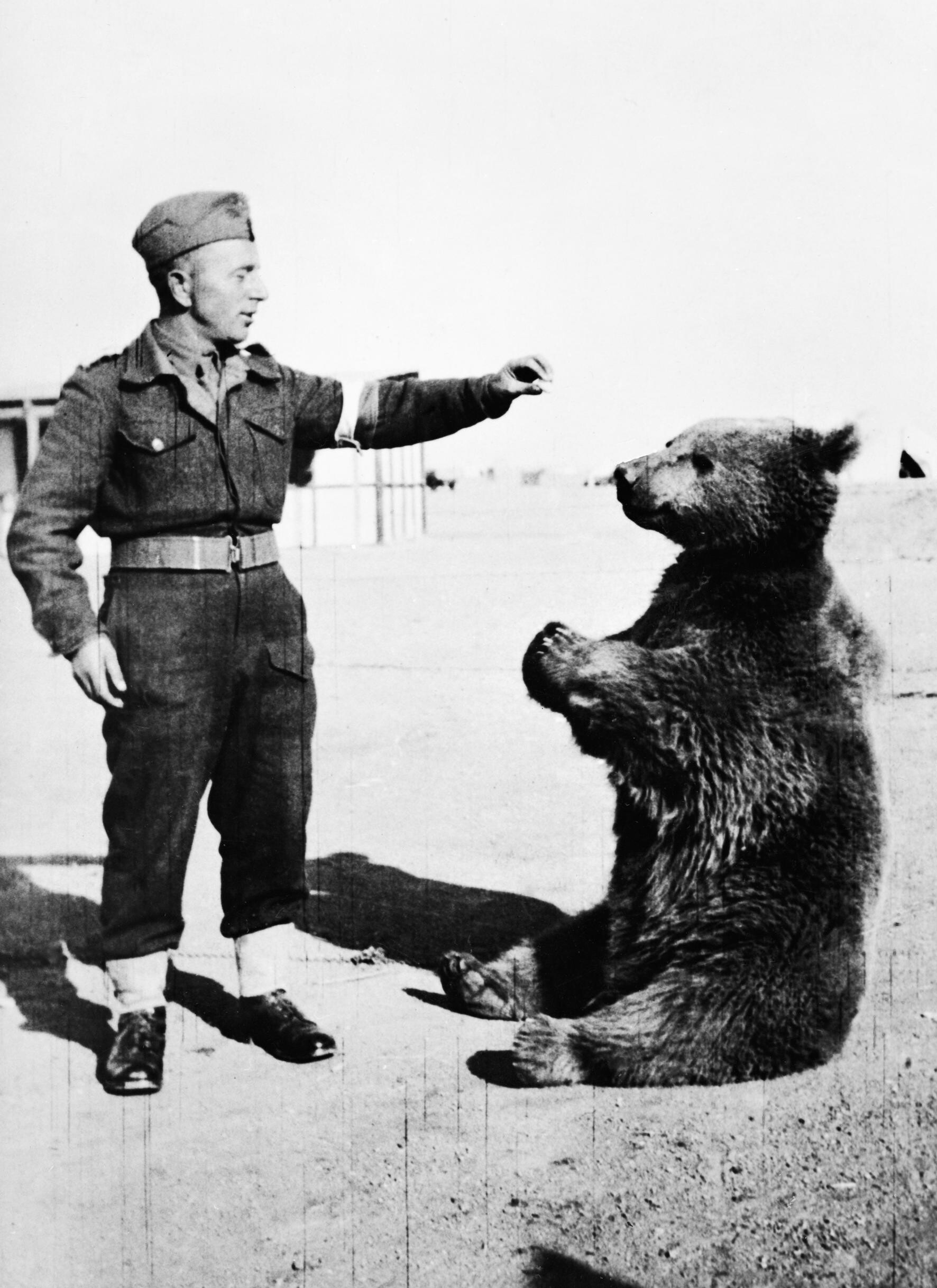
Woytek with a Polish soldier in 1942, some years before Woytek came to Scotland

One of the zoo's famous inhabitants during the post-war period was Wojtek, a Syrian brown bear. Wojtek had been sold to a group of Polish soldiers during the war. He learned to help the soldiers by carrying crates of ammunition, and became an unofficial mascot. In 1944 the Polish II Corps sailed to Italy to join the British 8th Army. Wojtek had to be officially drafted into the Polish army in order to secure his passage on a British transport ship. In 1946 the II Corps were demobilised and settled in Scotland, at Winfield Camp near Hutton, Berwickshire. Wojtek retired to Edinburgh Zoo in 1947 and lived there until his death in 1963. During his time in the army the bear had developed a liking for cigarettes, and this may have contributed to his popularity as an attraction at the zoo.

In 1972 the zoo gained yet more military credentials when king penguin Nils Olav was adopted by the Norwegian King's Guard. Norway's connection with Edinburgh's penguins began with the Salvesen family's links to the zoo, and renewed interest was sparked when a lieutenant called Nils Egelien visited the zoo with the King's Guard in 1961. On his return in 1972 Egelien arranged for the unit to adopt one of the penguins. Nils Olav was named after Egelien and in honour of King Olav V of Norway, and given the rank of lance corporal. A statue of the penguin now stands outside the zoo.

Three-year-old polar bear Mercedes was given to the zoo in 1984, after she was rescued in Churchill, Manitoba, Canada. She had begun wandering into the town in search of food. Because of the danger she posed to residents, Mercedes was tagged with a number so she could be tracked. When she could not be persuaded to return to the wild, a decision was taken to shoot her. A member of the Edinburgh Zoological Society collaborated with a cousin in Canada and they were able to rescue Mercedes, finding her a new home at Edinburgh zoo. The bear would become one of the zoo's most popular attractions.

In 1986, the society acquired the Highland Wildlife Park, a 259-acre (105 ha) safari park and zoo near Kingussie, 30 miles (48 km) south of Inverness. When opened in 1972 by Neil Macpherson, the Wildlife Park's goal was to showcase animals native to the Highlands of Scotland. Today its focus has changed and it primarily houses tundra species, including some animals which have been moved from Edinburgh Zoo itself.

== 21st century ==
In October 1999, the zoo had begun to explore the possibility of relocating in order to improve its facilities. As of February 2000, the zoo had scrapped its plans to relocate, instead announcing a "masterplan" for the redevelopment of the entire site.

The foot-and-mouth scare of 2001 forced the zoo to close, in order to protect the animals from possible infection. Since the zoo could not welcome any visitors, it faced significant financial losses. Questions were posed about the zoo's future, though in the end the park was able to reopen after only five weeks. Further help came in the form of a £1.9 million donation from an anonymous former resident of the city in early April, just as the zoo reopened.

In 2005, the new Budongo chimp house was unveiled, along with the Living Links to Human Evolution Centre, Britain's first primate behaviour research site. In a scientific breakthrough in 2006 chimpanzees at Edinburgh were found to use word-like vocal labels for food.

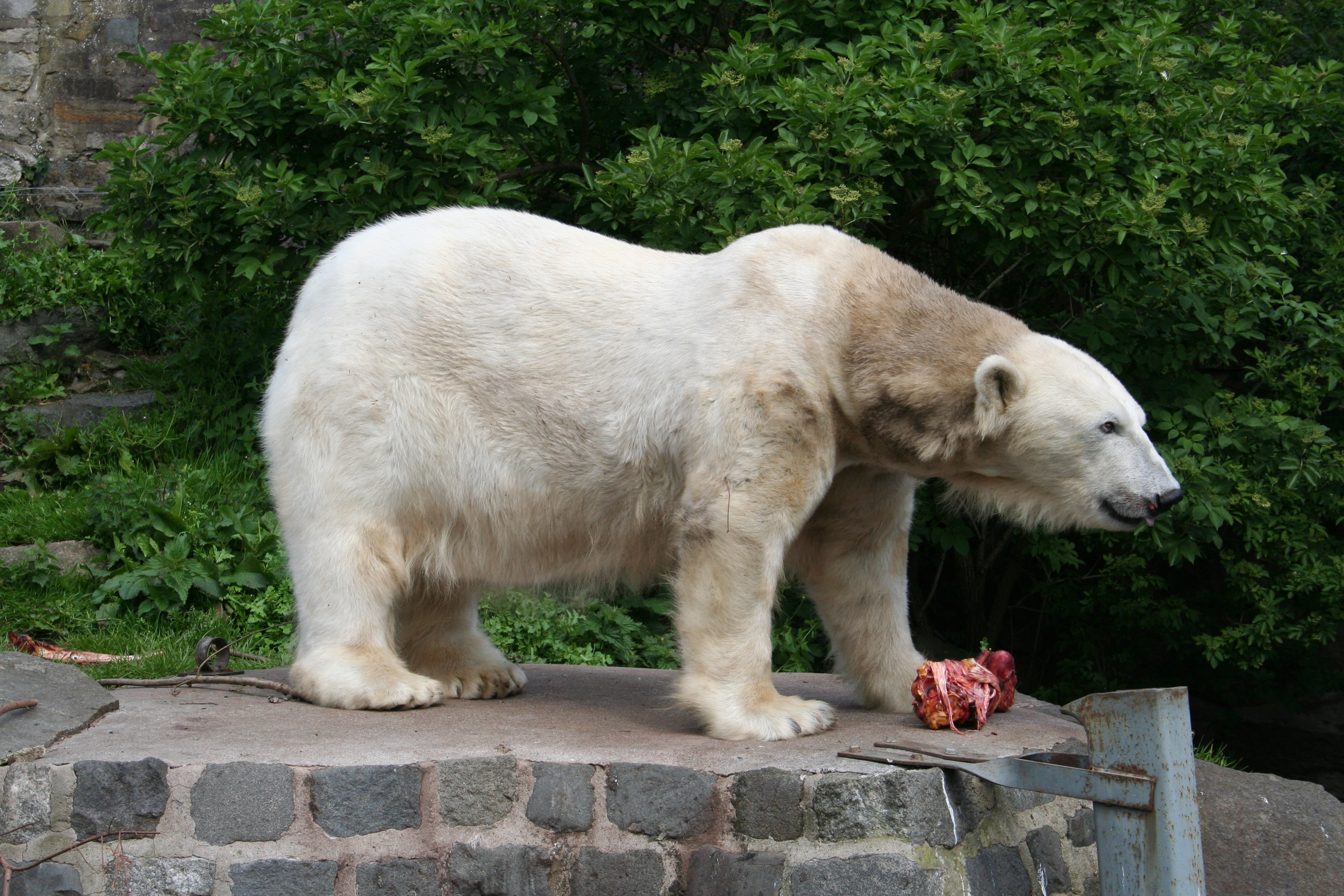
Polar bear Mercedes at Edinburgh Zoo in 2006

In late-2005 the Animal Liberation Front (ALF) threatened action over the holding in captivity of Mercedes, Britain's only polar bear at that time. The zoo had initially planned to retire their polar bear exhibit after the death of Mercedes. When zoo officials announced plans to create a new attraction, citing their responsibility to ensure the survival of the species, the ALF threatened damage to zoo workers' property and other scare-tactics. Edinburgh's treatment of polar bears had often been subject to criticism, punctuated by incidents like the death in 1997 of Mercedes' partner Barney, who choked on a plastic child's toy thrown into his enclosure. In 2009, the zoo carried out their plans to create a new exhibit and improve conditions for Mercedes, moving her to the Highland Wildlife Park, where she was joined by a young male polar bear named Walker. Mercedes was put to sleep on compassionate grounds in 2011, suffering from severe arthritis.

=== 2007 council troubles ===
In January 2006, the zoo put forward plans to sell off 15 acres (6.1 ha) of land in order to raise funds for the ongoing redevelopment. The plans were rejected by the council in October 2007 by a single vote, leaving the zoological society "extremely disappointed". In November, the zoo announced that it planned to fight the council's decision. A rumor circulated later that month that the zoo was considering a move to Glasgow, though zoo officials insisted the rumour had no truth to it. Organised opposition to the sale resulted in the zoo being allowed to sell only a small portion of the originally proposed land.

In 2012, the zoo announced plans for area for penguins which was to be completed before the next breeding season. The total cost was expected to be £750,000 with £100,000 of this raised through a public appeal.

In 2019, the zoo announced the development of a new enclosure for giraffes, and launched a Crowdfunder campaign to raise money for the project. Construction of the giraffe house began in 2019, and it opened in June 2021.
