= Chi Chi (giant panda) =

Giant panda (1954–1972)

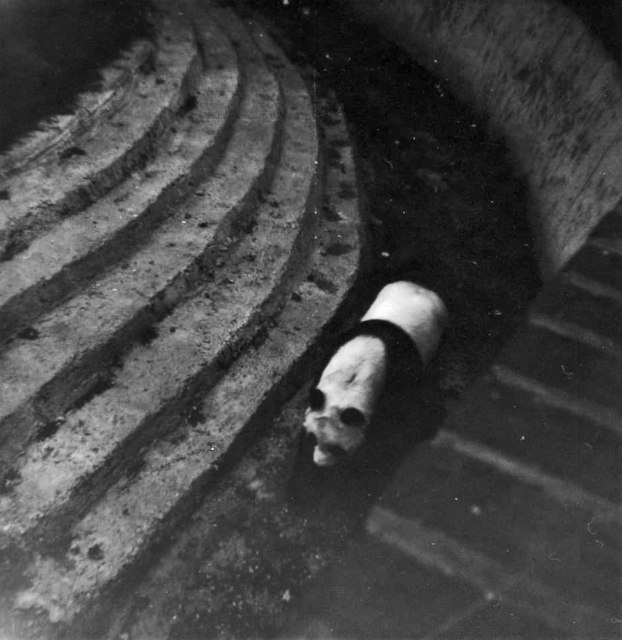
- Chi Chi at the London Zoo, September 1967
- Species: Giant panda
- Sex: Female
- Born: September 1954; Sichuan, China
- Died: 22 July 1972 (aged 17)

Chi Chi (Chinese: 姬姬; pinyin: Jī Jī; September 1954 – 22 July 1972) was a well-known female giant panda at London Zoo in the United Kingdom.

Chi Chi was not London Zoo's first giant panda; Ming was one of four that arrived in 1938, but Chi Chi became the Zoo's star attraction and Britain's best-known zoo animal.

Chi Chi is now a stuffed exhibit at the Natural History Museum in London.

== Life ==
Chi Chi was born in the wild in Sichuan, China. She was caught in May 1955 in Baoxing, Sichuan, and moved to Beijing Zoo in June. In May 1957, Kliment Voroshilov made a request for a panda for the Moscow Zoo during his visit to China, and she was sent to Moscow with another panda that same month. However, the attempts to mate them were unsuccessful due to sexual imprinting as a result of being reared by human keepers. The zoo suspected that both pandas were male, and as a result, the Soviets returned Chi Chi to China in exchange for another panda in January 1958. In May that same year, the Austrian animal broker, Heini Demmer, acquired Chi Chi from Beijing Zoo in exchange for an collection of African hoofstock and brought the animal back to Moscow Zoo. After resting for a week, the panda journeyed to Tierpark Berlin in East Berlin. By then, Chi Chi had already been sold to Brookfield Zoo in Illinois, United States. However, the Treasury Department stepped in and announced that the U.S. trade embargo on goods from China also applied to pandas. Chi Chi was thus refused entry to the US.

The Frankfurt Zoological Garden provided a temporary home for the panda until Demmer decided to temporarily hire the animal out to European zoos. She then visited Copenhagen Zoo in Denmark before she arrived at London Zoo on 5 September 1958. The Zoological Society of London had stated that it would not encourage collection of wild pandas, but accepted Chi Chi since she had already been collected. Although Chi Chi's visit was originally planned to last for only three weeks, it was decided to buy her for £12,000. Chi Chi became property of London Zoo on 26 September 1958. Around this time, photographer Stanley Long created a series of stereoscopic 3D views of Chi Chi for the VistaScreen publishing company. Bamboo shoots for Chi Chi were sourced from the Menabilly estate in Cornwall, which were harvested by boys from the local Scout troop and sent to London via Par railway station.

In 1966, when Chi Chi was nine years old, the Zoological Society of London approached their colleagues at Moscow Zoo with a view to attempting a mating with their male panda, called An An. Chi Chi spent seven months in Moscow, but wouldn't allow An An to approach, and the attempt was abandoned. Suspecting that a larger enclosure might produce better results, An An was brought to London Zoo in 1968, but attempts to mate the two pandas were unsuccessful, despite Chi Chi being injected with hormones intended to improve her receptiveness.

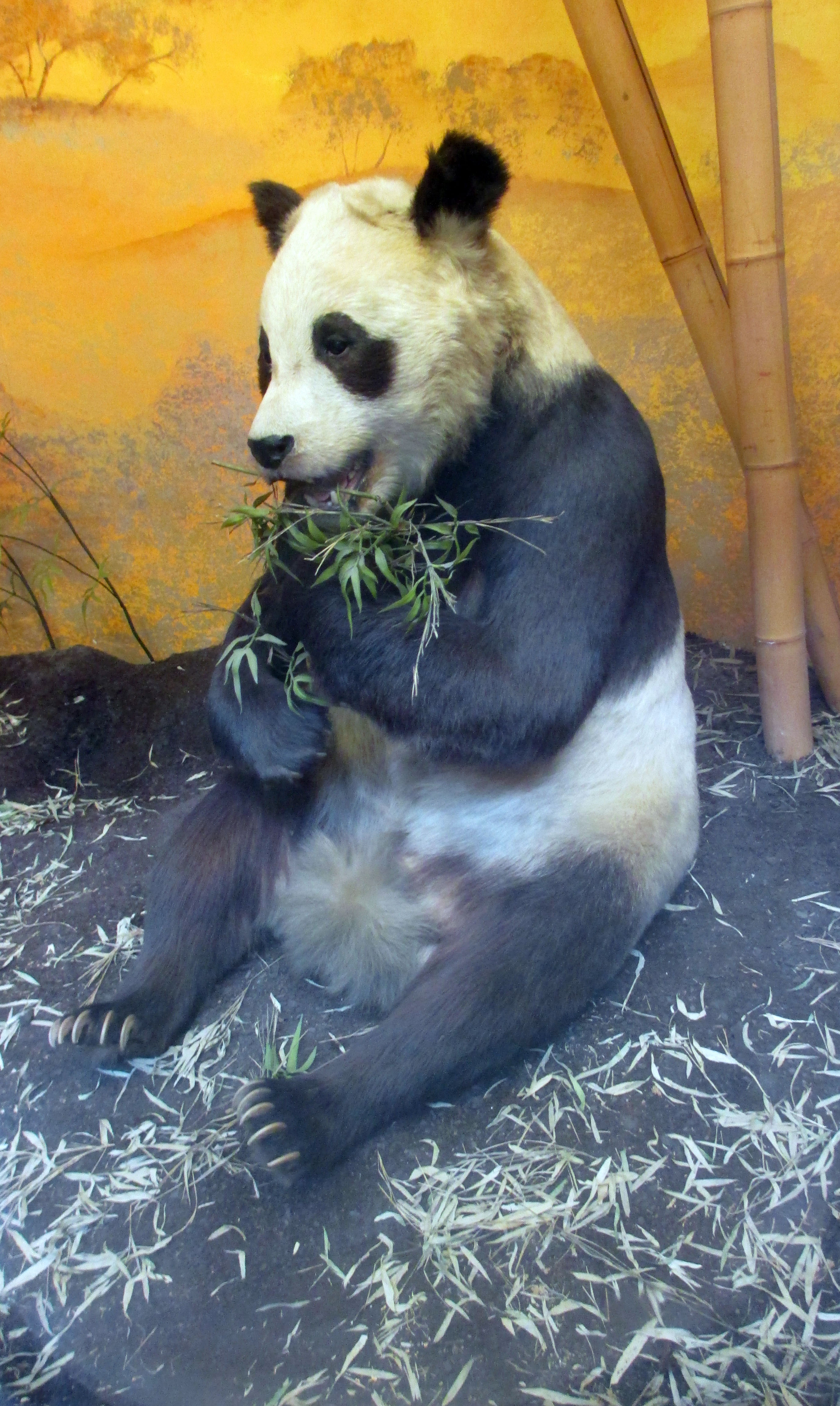
Stuffed remains at the Natural History Museum in London

Chi Chi was an inspiration for Sir Peter Scott's simple but distinctive logo design for the World Wildlife Fund. However, the organization's current logo is not the logo designed by Peter Scott but a later one, designed for WWF in 1986 when it changed its name from World Wildlife Fund to World Wide Fund for Nature. Chi Chi died at London Zoo on 22 July 1972 and was mourned by the nation. A post mortem was conducted. Her remains, now a stuffed exhibit, sit in a glass case at London's Natural History Museum.

== See also ==
- Other notable animals at London Zoo
- Panda diplomacy
- Tián Tián, giant panda at Edinburgh Zoo
- List of individual giant pandas
- List of individual bears
