= Thomas Haining Gillespie =

Scottish zoologist and solicitor (1876–1967)

- Born: 3 October 1876; Dumfries, Scotland
- Died: 3 August 1967 (aged 90); Edinburgh
- Occupations: Solicitor, writer, zoologist, broadcaster
- Spouse: Mary Elizabeth Gamble
- Writing career
- Pen name: T. H. Gillespie
- Genres: Non-fiction, zoology, guide books

Thomas Haining Gillespie FRSE FSZS (3 October 1876 – 3 August 1967) was a Scottish solicitor, zoological administrator, and broadcaster. He was the founder of Edinburgh Zoo and of its parent organisation the Royal Zoological Society of Scotland. As a broadcaster on the children's radio programme Children's Hour he was known as "the zoo man", giving talks and answering questions on zoological matters.

== Life ==
Tom Gillespie was born in Dumfries on 3 October 1876. His father was Thomas Haining Gillespie and his mother Julia Ann Satchell. He was educated in private schools and at Edinburgh University. He married Mary Elizabeth Gamble in 1920. They had no children and he died on 3 August 1967. At his own request, his body was bequeathed to medical research. His recreations were listed as 'reading, writing, music and photography'.

== Career ==
=== Zoologist ===
Gillespie qualified as a solicitor in 1899, but he had a strong interest in zoology and devoted his spare time to his dream of establishing a zoological park in Scotland. The cold climate presented an obstacle, but Gillespie was encouraged by the work of pioneering zoologists like Carl Hagenbeck and in 1909 he founded what was to become the Royal Zoological Society of Scotland. He carefully selected a site in central Edinburgh which would provide both favourable conditions for the animals and easy access for visitors, and with the help of Edinburgh City Council the site was purchased in 1913. Gillespie's efforts came to fruition with the opening on 22 July 1913 of the Scottish National Zoological Park—now known simply as Edinburgh Zoo. He served as director of the zoo from 1913 to 1950 and as secretary to the zoological society.

In 1933 he was elected a Fellow of the Royal Society of Edinburgh. His proposers were James Hartley Ashworth, Sir Thomas Barnby Whitson, Orlando Charnock Bradley and Sir Thomas Hudson Beare.

=== Broadcaster ===
Gillespie was well known on the Scottish Children's Hour radio programme as 'the Zoo Man' who gave talks about the animals in Edinburgh Zoo and who answered nature questions in a panel programme produced by Kathleen Garscadden. His contributions to these Children's Hour programmes began in 1926 when they were broadcast by the Edinburgh and Glasgow stations of the BBC. He was, in those early years, probably not billed as 'the Zoo Man' of the BBC - that title, for English stations at least, was given to David Seth-Smith who broadcast on Children's Hour and published books as 'Zoo Man of the BBC' in the 1930s. Gillespie's early books did not include the Zoo man nickname. However Gillespie was, by the late 1950s, being described as the 'Zoo man of the Scottish BBC' and he published books under that name from 1960 onwards. His early radio talks were published in a series of 'Zoo Tales' books which are listed below. He appears in a group photograph with Garscadden, the 'Bird Man of the BBC' (James Douglas-Home), and the 'Hut Man of the BBC' (Gilbert D. Fisher).

== Professional Appointments ==
- Fellow of the Royal Society of Edinburgh.
- Fellow of the Zoological Society of London.
- Member of the British Ornithologists' Union.
- Hon. Member of Zoological Society of Ireland.
- Corr. Member of the New York Zoological Society.
- Hon. Vice President of Edinburgh Scientific Film Society.

== Publications ==
=== Books ===
- Zoo Ways and Whys. With a foreword by Professor Sir J. Arthur Thomson. Illustrated with photographs by M.E. Gillespie. London: Herbert Jenkins, 1930.
- More Zoo Ways. With photographs by M.E. Gillespie. London: Herbert Jenkins, 1931.
- A Book of King Penguins. With 60 illustrations from photographs by M. E. Gillespie. London: Herbert Jenkins, 1932.
- Is It Cruel? A Study of the Condition of Captive and Performing Animals. With illustrations. London: Herbert Jenkins, 1934.
- Popular Official Guide to the Scottish Zoological Park. With plan of the Park and illustrations, etc. Edinburgh: Royal Zoological Society of Scotland, 1934.
- Zoo Tales. Illustrated by William Walls. Edinburgh & London: Oliver & Boyd, 1936
- The Way of a Serpent. A popular account of the habits of snakes. With illustrations. London: Herbert Jenkins, 1937.
- Animal Stories. Illustrated by Joan Sharp. Glasgow: Collins, 1938.
- The Scottish National Zoological Park. Cheltenham: J. Burrow & Co. [1938].
- Zoo-Man Tales. Illustrated by Len Fullerton. New York: Taplinger Pub. Co., 1960.
- Zoo-Man Again. Illustrated by Len Fullerton. New York: Taplinger Pub. Co., 1961.
- More Zoo Tales. Illustrated by Ralph Thompson. Edinburgh & London: Oliver & Boyd, 1962
- The Story of the Edinburgh Zoo. The Royal Zoological Society of Scotland and the Scottish National Zoological Park. An account of their origin and progress. [With plates.] Slains, Aberdeenshire: Michael Slains Publishers, 1964.
- Our Friends the Spiders. Illustrated by David Pratt. Edinburgh: Oliver & Boyd: Edinburgh, 1965.

=== Scots Magazine Articles ===
- "A Wolf Colony in Edinburgh", Vol. XIX, no. 3, June 1933, pp. 212–215.
- "Springtime at the Zoo", Vol. XXIII, no. 3, June 1935, pp. 176–180.
- "The Zoo in War-Time", Vol. XXXIV, no. 3, Dec. 1940, pp. 197–202.
- "Do You Know? A Nature Quiz", Vol. LVII, No. 1, April 1952, p. 1, (Answers on p. 71).
