= Uncle Rex =

Uncle Rex may refer to:

- Rex Palmer, early BBC Radio children's presenter, RAF officer
- Uncle Rex Sinclair, presenter on Australian radio station 2HD in the 1930s
- A character in Moschops (TV series)
