= Kathleen Garscadden =

Scottish radio broadcaster and presenter

- Born: 18 February 1897; Glasgow, Scotland
- Died: 20 February 1991 (aged 94); Glasgow, Scotland
- Occupation: Radio presenter
- Years active: 1923–1960

Kathleen Mary Evelyn Garscadden (18 February 1897 – 20 February 1991) was a Scottish radio broadcaster and presenter who became famous as presenter of the Scottish Children's Hour programme on the BBC Home Service which later became Radio Four. She was known as 'Auntie Kathleen' and her popularity turned her into a celebrity. Crowds gathered at the studio to obtain her autograph and she received a large volume of correspondence from listeners.

== Life ==
Kathleen Garscadden was born on 18 February 1897 at 13 Nithsdale Gardens, Crossmyloof, Glasgow, the daughter of George Garscadden, accountant and businessman, and his wife, Maggie Jane Vint. She was educated at Hutchesons' Girls' Grammar School, Glasgow, before moving to London to train as a professional singer under Sir Henry Wood. She abandoned her goal of becoming an opera singer and returned to Glasgow where her career began at the very beginnings of radio broadcasting. She never married and died in Glasgow, on 20 February 1991.

== Career ==
Garscadden acted as a singer, pianist and announcer on her father's amateur radio station. This radio station became the basis of the BBC's first Scottish radio station when it was taken over in 1923. She was then invited by the first station director to join the BBC as a programme assistant. Originally her Children's Hour programme was broadcast only in Glasgow but from 1928 onwards, it was broadcast throughout Scotland. In 1940, she was appointed as Children's Hour organiser for Scotland and she held that post until her retirement. Among the well-known entertainers who received their first opportunities from Garscadden were: Gordon Jackson, Fulton Mackay, John Grieve, Molly Weir, Tom Conti, Moira Anderson, Sydney Devine, Stanley Baxter, Jimmy Logan, Rikki Fulton, and Janet Brown. There is photograph of her with Tom H. Gillespie (known as the Zoo Man), James Douglas Home (The Bird Man) and Gilbert D. Fisher (the Hut Man). These three experts presented natural history programmes on Scottish Children's Hour, hosted by Garscadden. She retired in June 1960 after 37 years' service with the BBC. After Kathleen Garscadden retired, she continued to give piano and singing lessons at least into the late-1980s.
