= Tian Tian (female giant panda) =

Female giant panda (born 2003)

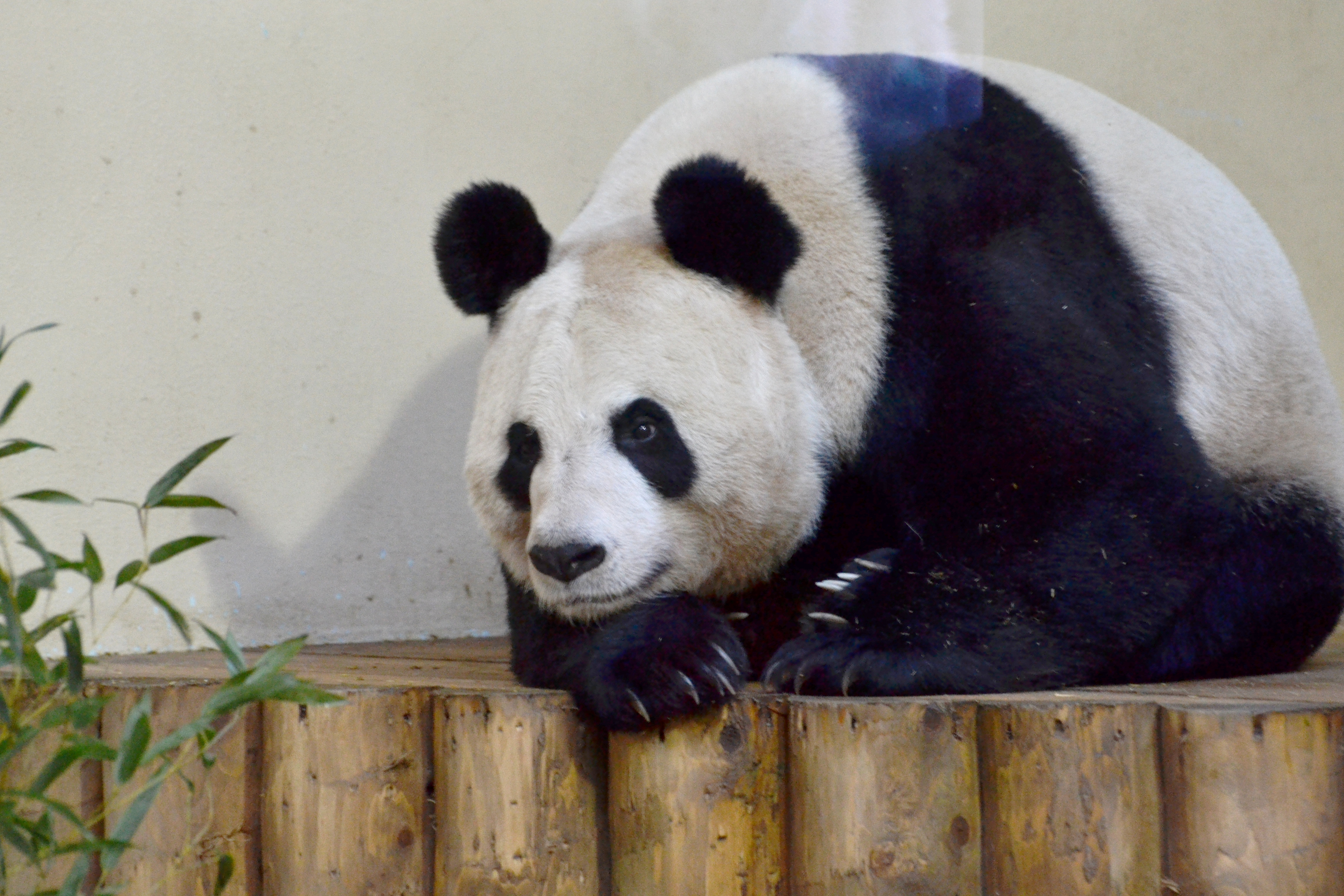
- Tian Tian at Edinburgh Zoo in 2012
- Other name: 甜甜
- Species: Giant panda
- Sex: Female
- Born: 24 August 2003 (age 23); Beijing Zoo
- Parents: Niu Niu (mother); Ying Ying (father)
- Mate: Yang Guang
- Offspring: Shen Wei (male); Bo Si (female)

Tian Tian (Chinese: 甜甜; pinyin: Tián Tián; lit. 'Sweet sweet'; born 24 August 2003) is a female giant panda born at the Beijing Zoo. She gave birth to twins in 2009, and arrived with a male panda named Yang Guang to Edinburgh Zoo on 4 December 2011. Tian Tian subsequently received media coverage for her numerous failed pregnancies. In December 2011, the BBC faced backlash after selecting her as the female Face of the Year. She returned to China in December 2023.

== Early life ==
Tian Tian was born on 24 August 2003 at the Beijing Zoo to mother Niu Niu and father Ying Ying. In October 2004, as part of an agreement involving the Beijing Zoo, Tian Tian and two other giant pandas, Ying Ying and Yuan Yuan, were exchanged as part of a breeding project, and she was planned to live at the Panda Base for 25 years. In Chinese, her name means "Sweetie".

== Edinburgh Zoo and "Pandagate" ==
She arrived at Edinburgh Zoo on 4 December 2011 with a male panda named Yang Guang (Chinese: 阳光; pinyin: Yáng Guāng; lit. 'sunshine'). They were on loan from the Bifengxia Panda Base in China at a cost of £640,000 per year. Their arrival marked the first time in 17 years that a giant panda had landed on the British Isles, and they became the only two pandas in the United Kingdom.

Tian Tian and Yang Guang accrued a record number of visitors to Edinburgh Zoo, as well as over £5 million. After their arrival, BBC chose Tian Tian as one of its female "Faces of the Year" for 2011, representing December. The decision was contested, since the men's list only included humans, so Yang Guang was not included. The BBC had already faced criticism that year after no women were among the ten nominees for the Sports Personality of the Year Award. In response, the BBC said that they had previously nominated animals for Face of the Year, such as Benson the carp in August 2009. The controversy was referred to as "Pandagate" on Twitter.

== Pregnancies ==
While she was in China, Tian Tian successfully gave birth to twins on 7 August 2009. The male cub was named Shen Wei and the female Bo Si. Yang Guang was not the father. After her arrival at Edinburgh Zoo, she had an unsuccessful mating season around April 2012. In April 2013, the Royal Zoological Society of Scotland artificially inseminated her, making it the first artificial insemination procedure on a giant panda in the UK. They later confirmed that Tian Tian had become pregnant, but most likely reabsorbed the foetus late term. She was artificially inseminated with the semen from other pandas, such as Bao Bao, since Yang Guang did not have enough semen available for Tian Tian. On 12 August 2014, Iain Valentine, Director of Giant Pandas for the Royal Zoological Society of Scotland, announced that scientific data suggested Tian Tian was pregnant and that implantation had taken place. A birth was considered possible towards the end of August, although the zoo cautioned that the tests were not definitive. On 22 September 2014, Edinburgh Zoo announced that she was no longer pregnant. On 26 March 2015, it was announced that a third artificial insemination had taken place but by August 2015, it was believed she had lost the cub. In October 2015, scientists said they were exploring cloning the pandas at Edinburgh Zoo.

On 24 August 2017, it was revealed that Edinburgh Zoo had believed she was pregnant again after being artificially inseminated for the fifth time in 2016. The expected date for a birth was as early as 25 August 2017, although the Zoo said that it was hard to predict and that the panda breeding season can last until late September. On 11 September 2017, the Zoo said that Tian Tian was not pregnant and her hormone levels had returned to normal.

The coverage of Tian Tian's pregnancies at Edinburgh Zoo became so widespread that PM, a current affairs programme by BBC Radio 4, broadcast satirical daily "Possible Panda Pregnancy Update[s]".

== Return to China ==
The initial ten-year loan was extended by two years due to the COVID-19 pandemic; in September 2023, it was announced that the pair would return to China in December of that year. The pandas arrived at the Chengdu Shuangliu International Airport on 5 December 2023.

== See also ==
- List of individual giant pandas
- List of individual bears
