= Mary Plain =

Fictional bear in novels by Gwynedd Rae

Mary Plain is a fictional bear character in British children's literature who figures in a series of novels based on her adventures. The character was created by the Welsh author Gwynedd Rae and first appeared in the book Mostly Mary in 1930. The last original book, Mary Plain's Whodunnit, was published in 1965. The books were reissued as paperbacks in the 1970s, and new editions of Mostly Mary and All Mary were published in the 1990s. In 2017, further editions of four of the books were issued by Egmont.

== Characters and story ==
Mary Plain and her bear family feature in the stories, but the main characters are Mary and her human friend, the Owl Man. (The name refers to his spectacles.) He is kind and indulgent to Mary. He often takes her on outings. Mary and her friends can speak, but although anthropomorphic in that respect and in other aspects of their behaviour, the author is careful to point out that she is not a teddy bear. Similarly, although Mary learns to write (in rebuses) she does not wear clothes. Mary and her family live in the Bear Pits at Bern, in Switzerland.

Mary's behaviour is much like that of a small child, with the Owl Man acting as a surrogate parent, guiding her through life and helping her out of trouble.

== Style ==
The books are written in chapter form, with illustrations throughout and on the cover (front cover on original editions, front and back on paperback editions). The cover illustrations were updated in the 1970s and the references in some books were updated to change the currency to decimal coinage and to feature a Blue Peter presenter John Noakes instead of the older Uncle Mac from Children's Hour.

== Illustrators ==
The original illustrator for Mostly Mary and All Mary was Harry Rountree. From the third book onward, and in subsequent editions of the first two books, the illustrations were by Irene Williamson. New illustrations by Janina Ede were commissioned for the Knight Books reprints in the late 1960s and 1970s; the Egmont Press editions have illustrations by Clara Vulliamy.

== Radio and television adaptations ==
Mary Plain stories were read on the BBC Radio Children's Hour in the 1930s and have featured on the long-running BBC Television series Jackanory in 1969 with actor Richard Wattis reading the books.

== Books ==
- 1930: Mostly Mary
- 1931: All Mary
- 1935: Mary Plain in Town
- 1937: Mary Plain on Holiday
- 1940: Mary Plain in Trouble
- 1942: Mary Plain in War-Time
- 1944: Mary Plain's Big Adventure
- 1949: Mary Plain Home Again
- 1950: Mary Plain to the Rescue
- 1952: Mary Plain and the Twins
- 1954: Mary Plain Goes Bob-a-Jobbing
- 1957: Mary Plain Goes to America
- 1961: Mary Plain, V.I.P.
- 1965: Mary Plain's "Whodunit"
