= Gwynedd Rae =

British writer

Gwynedd Rae (born 23 July 1892, Gipsy Hill, Norwood, Surrey – died 14 November 1977, Tott Close, Burwash, Sussex, aged 85), was the author of children's books about a bear called Mary Plain. Her stories were read on BBC Radio Children's Hour in the 1930s and by Richard Briers on BBC TV's Jackanory in 1969. She was the daughter of George Bentham Rae, stockbroker (born 1846, Birkenhead) and Mary Victorine Rae (born 1858, San Francisco, US).

== Publications in date order ==
- 1930: Mostly Mary
- 1931: All Mary
- 1934: And Timothy Too. [A novel.]
- 1935: Leap Year Born
- 1935: Mary Plain in Town
- 1937: Mary Plain on Holiday
- 1940: Mary Plain in Trouble
- 1942: Mary Plain in War-Time
- 1944: Mary Plain's Big Adventure
- 1949: Mary Plain Home Again
- 1949: Mary Plain Lends a Paw
- 1950: Mary Plain to the Rescue
- 1961: Mary Plain, V.I.P.
- 1952: Mary Plain and the Twins
- 1954: Mary Plain goes bob-a-jobbing
- 1957: Mary Plain goes to America
- 1965: Mary Plain's "Whodunit"
- 2017: Mary Plain in London
- 2017: Mary Plain in America

== Books by Gwynedd Rae, held by the British Library, in alphabetical order ==
- All Mary ... Illustrated, etc. E. Mathews & Marrot: London, 1931.
- All Mary ... With illustrations by Irene Williamson. Cobden-Sanderson: London, 1938.
- All Mary; illustrated by Janina Ede. Brockhampton P, 1968. Series: Red knight books ISBN 0-340-03071-2
- All Mary; with illustrations by Irene Williams. Rev. ed. London : Owl Man, 1995. ISBN 1-900186-00-4
- And Timothy Too. [A novel.] . Blackie & Son: London & Glasgow, 1934.
- Leap Year Born. pp. 281. Blackie & Son: London & Glasgow, 1935.
- Mary Plain and the Twins ... With illustrations by Irene Williamson. Routledge & Kegan Paul: London, 1952.
- Mary Plain and the twins, illustrated by Janina Ede. Leicester : Knight Books, 1970. Series: ( A red knight book). ISBN 0-340-03998-1 (pbk)
- Mary Plain goes bob-a-jobbing ... With illustrations by Irene Williamson. Routledge & Kegan Paul: London, 1954.
- Mary Plain goes to America ... With illustrations by Irene Williamson. Routledge & Kegan Paul: London, 1957.
- Mary Plain goes to America; illustrated by Janina Ede.Leicester : Knight Books, 1971. Series: A Red Knight book) ISBN 0-340-14906-X (pbk)
- Mary Plain Home Again ... With illustrations by Irene Williamson. Routledge & Kegan Paul: London, 1949 [1948].
- Mary Plain in Town ... With illustrations by Irene Williamson. Cobden-Sanderson: London, 1935.
- Mary Plain in Trouble ... With illustrations by Irene Williamson. G. Routledge & Sons: London, 1940.
- Mary Plain in War-Time, etc. G. Routledge & Sons: London, 1942.
- The Mary Plain omnibus; illustrated by Irene Williamson. London : Routledge and Kegan Paul, 1976. Contents: Mostly Mary - All Mary - Mary Plain in town - Mary Plain on holiday. ISBN 0-7100-8437-4
- Mary Plain on Holiday ... With illustrations by Irene Williamson. Cobden-Sanderson: London, 1937.
- Mary Plain on holiday; illustrated by Janina Ede. London : Knight Books, 1969. Series: A red knight book
- Mary Plain to the Rescue. With illustrations by Irene Williamson.Routledge & Kegan Paul: London, 1950.
- Mary Plain to the rescue; illustrated by Janina Ede.Leicester : Knight Books, 1971. Series: Red knight book ISBN 0-340-14907-8 (pbk)
- Mary Plain, V.I.P. ... With illustrations by Irene Williamson.. Routledge & Kegan Paul: London, 1961.
- Mary Plain's Big Adventure ... With illustrations by Irene Williamson, G. Routledge & Sons: London, 1944
- Mary Plain's big adventure; illustrated by Janina Ede., Leicester : Knight Books, 1970. Series: Red Knight book ISBN 0-340-10395-7 (pbk)
- Mary Plain's "Whodunit" ... With illustrations by Irene Williamson. Routledge & Kegan Paul: London, 1965.
- Mostly Mary ... Illustrated, etc. E. Mathews & Marrot: London, 1930
- Mostly Mary With illustrations by Irene Williamson, Cobden-Sanderson: London, 1938.
- Mostly Mary, illustrated by Janina Ede. Brockhampton P, 1968. Series: Red Knight books.
- Mostly Mary, with illustrations by Irene Williams. Rev. ed. London: The Owl Man, 1995. ISBN 1-900186-02-0
