= David Seth-Smith =

British zoologist

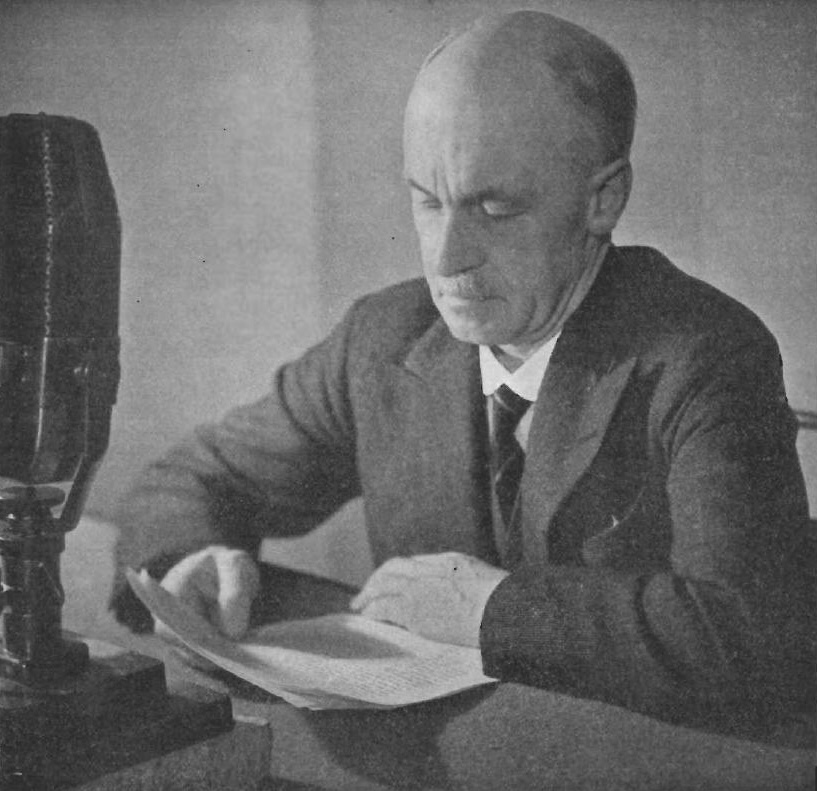
- Smith around 1936
- Born: 9 March 1875
- Died: 30 October 1963 (aged 88)
- Presenting career
- Show: Children's Hour
- Station: Home Service
- Network: BBC
- Country: United Kingdom

David Seth-Smith FZS, MBOU (9 March 1875 – 30 October 1963) was a British zoologist, wildlife artist, nature broadcaster and author.

His career included spells as Curator of Mammals and Birds for the Zoological Society of London and editor of the Bulletin of the British Ornithologists' Club and the Avicultural Magazine. In 1905 he was appointed a member of council for the Zoological Society and was awarded the society's Silver Medal in 1908. He later presented nature programmes on the BBC's Children's Hour under the name "The Zoo Man", and also "Friends from the Zoo" on BBC Television, giving his first broadcast in 1932. He illustrated and photographed many animals and birds in captivity and is credited for taking the only known photographs of the now extinct pink-headed duck.

By 1945, he was a Fellow of the Zoological Society; Member of the British Ornithologists' Union; Hon. Fellow, New York Zoological Society; Corresponding Fellow, American Ornithologists' Union; and Corresponding Member, Societe National d'Acclimatation de France.

He was the first-born son of William Seth Smith (1824–1887), by his second marriage to Catherine Sarah (née Edwards). He married firstly Mary, daughter of James Benjamin Scott and his wife Sarah, on 11 June 1900, and they had four children. Following her death, he married secondly Heather (née Heydemann), on 11 January 1946. His grandfather was the developer Seth Smith, who built large portions of Mayfair and Belgravia in the West End, and his half-brother, William Howard Seth-Smith III was also a noted architect.

== List of works ==
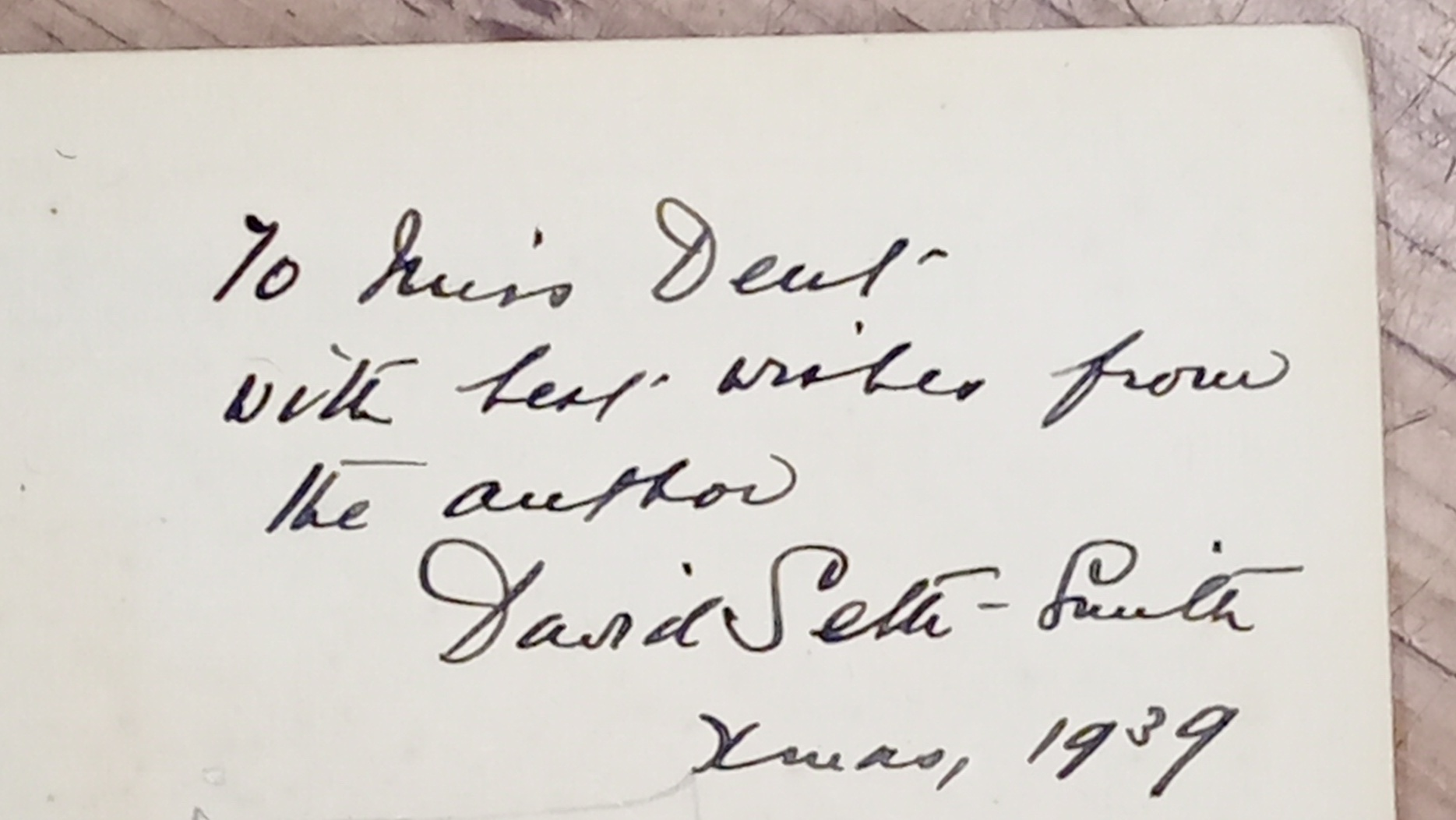
Autographed dedication from a copy of More Adventures with The Zoo Man

- Parakeets: A Handbook to the Imported Species (R.H. Porter, 1903) - revised second edition (Quaritch, 1926) - further revised by Matthew M. Vriends for later editions as: Small Parrots (Parrakeets) (1979-)
- Adventures with The Zoo Man (Pitman, 1935)
- Zoo Friends - A Pictorial Tour of the Zoo, reproduced from over 300 photographs (Associated Newspapers, 1935?)
- Animals and their Young (Routledge, 1936) - introduction, with photos by Gabriel Denes
- The Zoo Man Speaking (Thomas Nelson, 1937)
- Stories by The Zoo Man (E.J. Arnold, 1939) - no. 26 in the "Broadcast Echoes" series
- Birds of Our Country and of the Dominions, Colonies and Dependencies; their Life, Eggs, Nests and Identification (Hutchinson, 1939-) - 2 vols., editor
- More Adventures with The Zoo Man (Pitman, 1939)
- The Zoo Man Talks About the Wild Animals of Our Country (Littlebury, 1945)
- The Zoo Man Talks About the Wild Birds of Our Country (Littlebury, 1946)
- Jolly Families, by the Zoo Man of the BBC (Studly Press, 1946) - no. 12 in the "Tally-Ho" series, illustrated by Walter Trier
- Natural History Birds and Mammals (Herbert Jenkins, 1949) - from the "Reason Why" series
- Zoo Birds (Penguin, 1951?) - no. 68 in the "Puffin Picture" series of books
