= Gilbert Dempster Fisher =

Scottish broadcaster, writer and naturalist

- Born: 18 August 1906; Bishopton, Renfrewshire, Scotland
- Died: 11 July 1985 (aged 78); North Berwick, East Lothian, UK
- Occupations: Writer, naturalist, broadcaster, administrator
- Spouse: Ella Veitch Shaw
- Children: one son
- Writing career
- Pen name: G.D. Fisher
- Genres: Non-fiction, natural history, poetry, ornithology

Gilbert Dempster Fisher (1906–1985) was a Scottish broadcaster, writer and naturalist who achieved prominence on BBC Scottish Radio as a naturalist under the persona of 'the Hut Man'.

== Life ==
Gilbert D. Fisher was born on 18 August 1906 at Bishopton, Renfrewshire. His father was William Duncan Fisher, an accountant, and his mother Mary McEwan Dempster. In 1940, he married Ella Veitch Shaw in Edinburgh and they had a son named Jeremy. He died on 11 July 1985 at his home at North Berwick, East Lothian.

== Career ==
After school Fisher entered the business world and after ten years in business he retired to devote himself to nature studies. He was elected member of the British Ornithologists' Union in 1936. Around that year, he settled down in a hut in the moors north of the village of Lochwinnoch in Renfrewshire. He published The Hut Man's Book in 1938, and it was re-published as a Puffin Story Book in 1950. During the 1939–45 war, he apparently joined the Royal Air Force. According to the London Gazette, on 11 September 1941, he was promoted from Acting Flying Officer to Flying Officer on probation. His radio broadcasts under the persona of the Hut Man began on the BBC Home Service in Scotland on Monday 12 January 1948 at 5.25pm. The programme on Children's Hour was called 'Hut-Country Walks' and it featured two children exploring the Hut Country with the Hut Man. It was later called 'Exploring the Hut Country' and was broadcast every month or so. This 'Hut Country' programme was very popular and he used his celebrity status to pioneer nature studies in Scottish schools. The last 'Exploring the Hut Country' programme was broadcast on 19 June 1956 at 5pm. Fisher's broadcast career ended in 1956 when he was appointed director-secretary of the Royal Zoological Society of Scotland. He was effectively in charge of Edinburgh Zoo until he retired in 1971.

== Publications ==
- A Number of Things: Verses for children. Drawn and decorated by E. V. Shaw. Edinburgh & London: Moray Press, 1935.
- The Hut Man's Book, Illustrated by E. V. Shaw, (1) Hardback – Edinburgh & London: W. & R. Chambers, 1938. (2) Paperback – Harmondsworth: Penguin Books, 1950 (Puffin Story Book, no. 58.)
- Adventure in the Hut Country, Illustrated by E. V. Shaw, Edinburgh: W. & R. Chambers, 1939
- Hut Country Days. Scraperboard drawings by James Lucas. London: Sylvan Press, 1948.
- Your Nature Book. London: Sylvan Press: London, 1949.
- Exploring the Hut Country. Edinburgh & London: W. & R. Chambers, 1952
- Children's Book of British Birds , Edinburgh & London: W. & R. Chambers, 1952.
- The Teacher's Book of Nature Study. With three lessons on the sea-shore written and illustrated by John Smyth. Edinburgh & London: W. & R. Chambers, 1958
- Guide to the Royal Zoological Society of Scotland's Park at Edinburgh. Edinburgh: Royal Zoological Society of Scotland, 195?
