= Highland Wildlife Park =

- Interactive map of Highland Wildlife Park
- 57°6′40″N 3°58′29″W
- Date opened: 1972
- Location: Kingussie, Scotland, UK
- Land area: 105 hectares (260 acres)
- No. of animals: 300+
- No. of species: ~60
- Annual visitors: 142,000 (2019)
- Memberships: BIAZA; EAZA
- Major exhibits: Cold Climate Species, many IUCN listed and part of conservation breeding programmes. A limited number of native Scottish wildlife including critically endangered Scottish wildcat and red deer.
- Website: www.highlandwildlifepark.org.uk

The Highland Wildlife Park is a 105-hectare (260-acre) safari park and zoo in Kingussie, Scotland. The park is located within the Cairngorms National Park. The park is run by the Royal Zoological Society of Scotland and is a member of the British and Irish Association of Zoos and Aquariums (BIAZA) and the European Association of Zoos and Aquaria (EAZA).

== History ==
The Highland Wildlife Park was opened in 1972 and has been run by the Royal Zoological Society of Scotland (which also operates the Edinburgh Zoo) since 1986. With the exception of Christmas Day, the park is open every day of the year, weather permitting.

In 1980 the park was made famous by obtaining "Felicity", a puma that was reputedly captured nearby by a farmer. The puma lived out her days in the park and is now on show stuffed in the Inverness Museum. In the past the park has also been the home to several examples of the famous "Kellas cat".

The Royal Zoological Society of Scotland, owner and administrator of the Highland Wildlife Park, altered the theme of the park in 2007 from native species of the Highlands, to species from tundra and mountainous habitats around the world. This move is an attempt to bring the park closer to the working practices of the RZSS' main site, Edinburgh Zoo as well as to increase visitor numbers which had been virtually static for some years.

Although the park was in need of serious investment for some years, many locals to the area as well as frequent visitors believe that this move would distance the park from its hitherto unique attraction as a place to see native species in their natural habitat, and will eventually turn the park into another safari park filled with ever more exotic animals in an attempt to attract more of the area's visitors.

In response to this view, the RZSS claims that the new animals in the park's collection are for the most part extremely endangered, and their presence at the park will help safeguard their future, as well as demonstrating the Highlands' place in the global ecosystem.

However, critics said that many of the animals which were lost in the first wave of alterations (badgers, red foxes, Soay sheep, Highland cattle, European polecat) may not have been endangered in the Highlands, but were the kinds of animals that visitors associate with the Highlands and would be extremely lucky to have seen in person during their stay.

The first animals to arrive were two bharals in February 2007, closely followed by markhors and yaks at Easter. Kiang followed and the first Japanese macaques came at the end of June 2007.

In 2008, Bactrian deer, Chinese gorals, Mishmi takins, red pandas, Himalayan tahr, northern lynxes, Afghan urial and European elks arrived, some coming from Edinburgh Zoo.

2008 also saw the arrival of a purpose-built aviary for Himalayan snowcocks. The park also had several Mishmi takin, kiang, markhor, and urial births.

The new Amur tiger enclosure has opened at the park, costing £400,000. It is now home to a pair of tigers, Sasha and Yuri a proven breeding pair from Edinburgh zoo. On 11 May, three cubs were born and are now taking their first steps into the main enclosure under the watchful eye of mum Sasha. Births in 2009 also include first breedings at the park for European elk and Himalayan tahr.

A new exhibit for a pair of Eurasian wolves opened in 2011 as well as a new exhibit for Pallas's cats. A bachelor herd of vicuña also arrived from the Edinburgh Zoo. Common cranes also arrived. The Pallas's cats have bred, raising 3 kittens. New aviaries for snowy and great grey owls were constructed. Two female muskoxen have arrived at the park from the Netherlands, they are a mother/daughter pair and are the first muskoxen imported into the UK in over 20 years.

Five female white-lipped deer have arrived at the park from the Edinburgh Zoo, these are the only females of their species in the UK. A new enclosure for Finnish forest reindeer has been built next to the wolves. A new male polar bear and male Amur tiger arrived at the park. Five wolves, a Japanese serow and two lynxes were born in 2012 a male muskox arrived from Sweden, two red pandas also joined the collection. A new Chinese goral enclosure has been constructed; their former enclosure is being developed for wolverines. Wolverine have arrived and recent births (June 2013) include the park's first great grey owl, white-lipped deer, red panda and muskoxen along with Turkmenian markhors, northern lynxes, Amur tigers, Bactrian deers, and Mishmi takins. In 2014, a female European bison was returned for reintroduction to Romania, amongst the births at the park were 6 Pallas's cat kittens, two female Mishmi takins and the first hatching of a satyr tragopan for the park. Summer 2014 saw the start of construction of a new enclosure for a sourced female polar bear that will be arriving at the park in spring 2015. It was confirmed in October 2014 that snow leopards and Amur leopards would arrive at the park in 2015. The last bharal and Japanese serow left the collection in 2014.

2015 saw the arrival of a female polar bear from the Aalborg Zoo in Denmark, kept in a specially-built enclosure behind the muskoxen, where there is a sub enclosure for a male that has been introduced to her. In 2018 a resulting polar bear cub was born at the wildlife park.

The park's first snow leopards have arrived from Marwell and Krefeld zoos and have been released into a cliff face enclosure, next to the markhor. April 2016 saw the first birth at the park and in Scotland of twin wolverine kits. 2016 also saw the last of the kiang herd transferred to the Knowsley Safari Park. A male reindeer was born in June and the park has welcomed its first Amur leopard, housed in an offshow breeding unit, located at the rear of the park. The offshow pair of Amur leopards produced a pair of twins in summer 2018. The first polar bear to be born in the UK for 25 years arrived at the end of 2017. The week before Christmas, the female polar bear, Victoria gave birth to a male to be called Hamish. The park also had their first common crane and snow leopards born in 2019.

== Attractions ==
Visitors experience Scottish wildlife past and present in the setting of the Scottish Highlands. On show are a variety of animals found in present-day Scotland, animals that were once present, hundreds, even thousands of years ago, and mountainous regions all over the globe. Visitors drive around the Main Reserve in their cars and then move on to a walk-round area.

== Animals ==
=== Main Reserve (Safari Park) ===
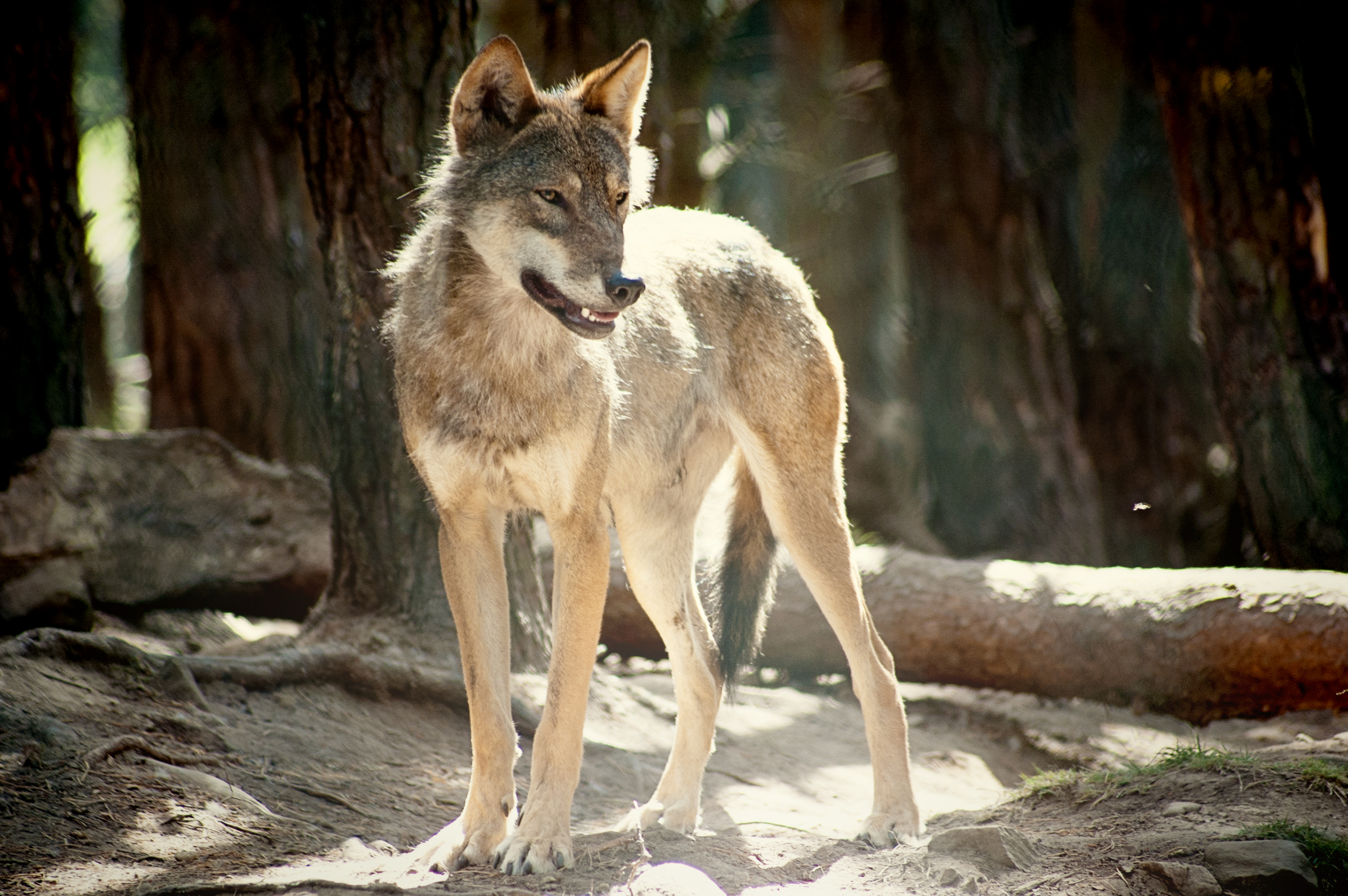
The park has won awards for its wolf enclosure

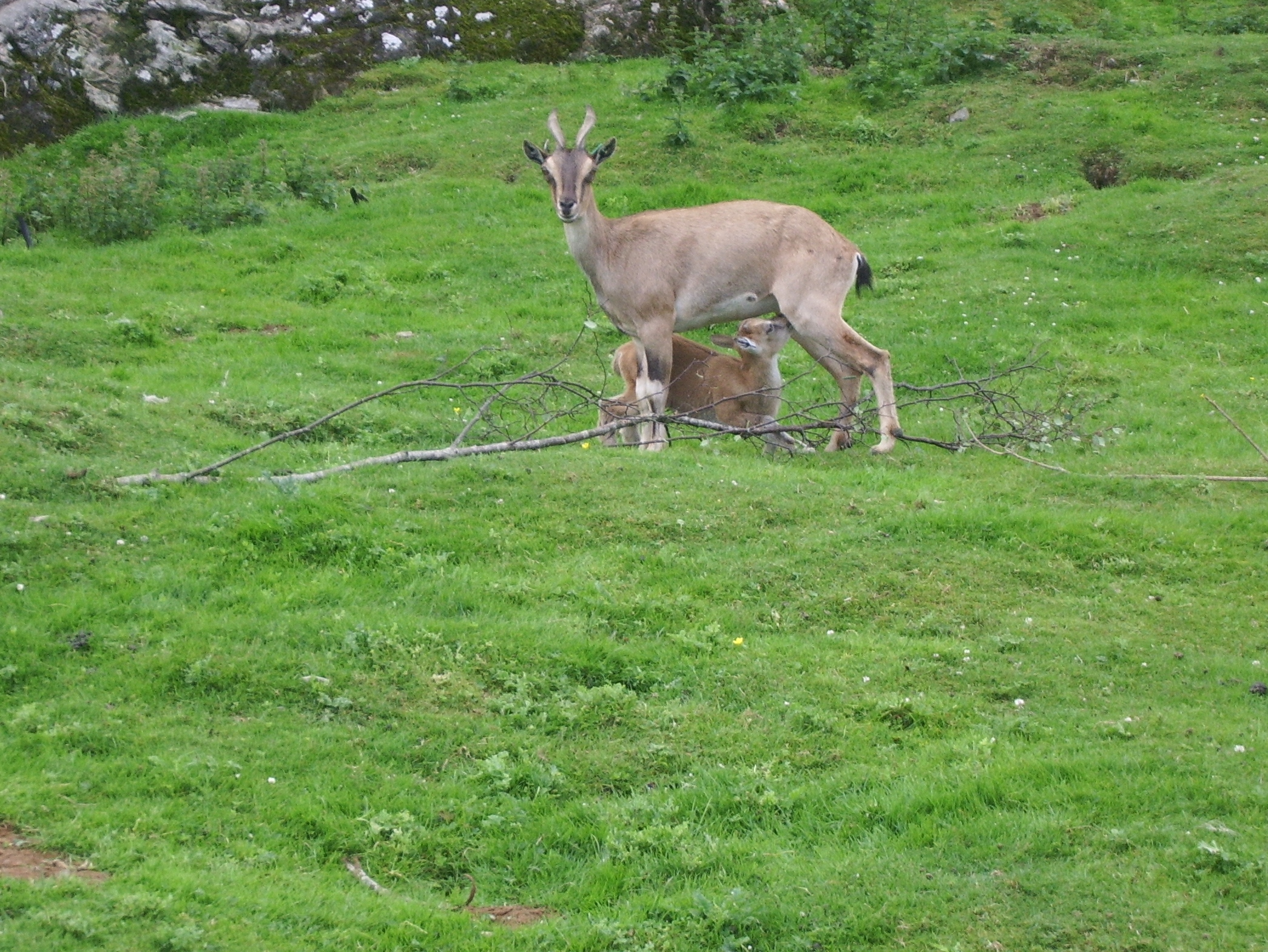
Female Turkmenian markhor at the Wildlife Park

- European elk
- European bison
- Przewalski's horse
- Red deer
- Bactrian camel
- Bactrian deer
- Vicuña
- Yak

=== Walk-round enclosures ===
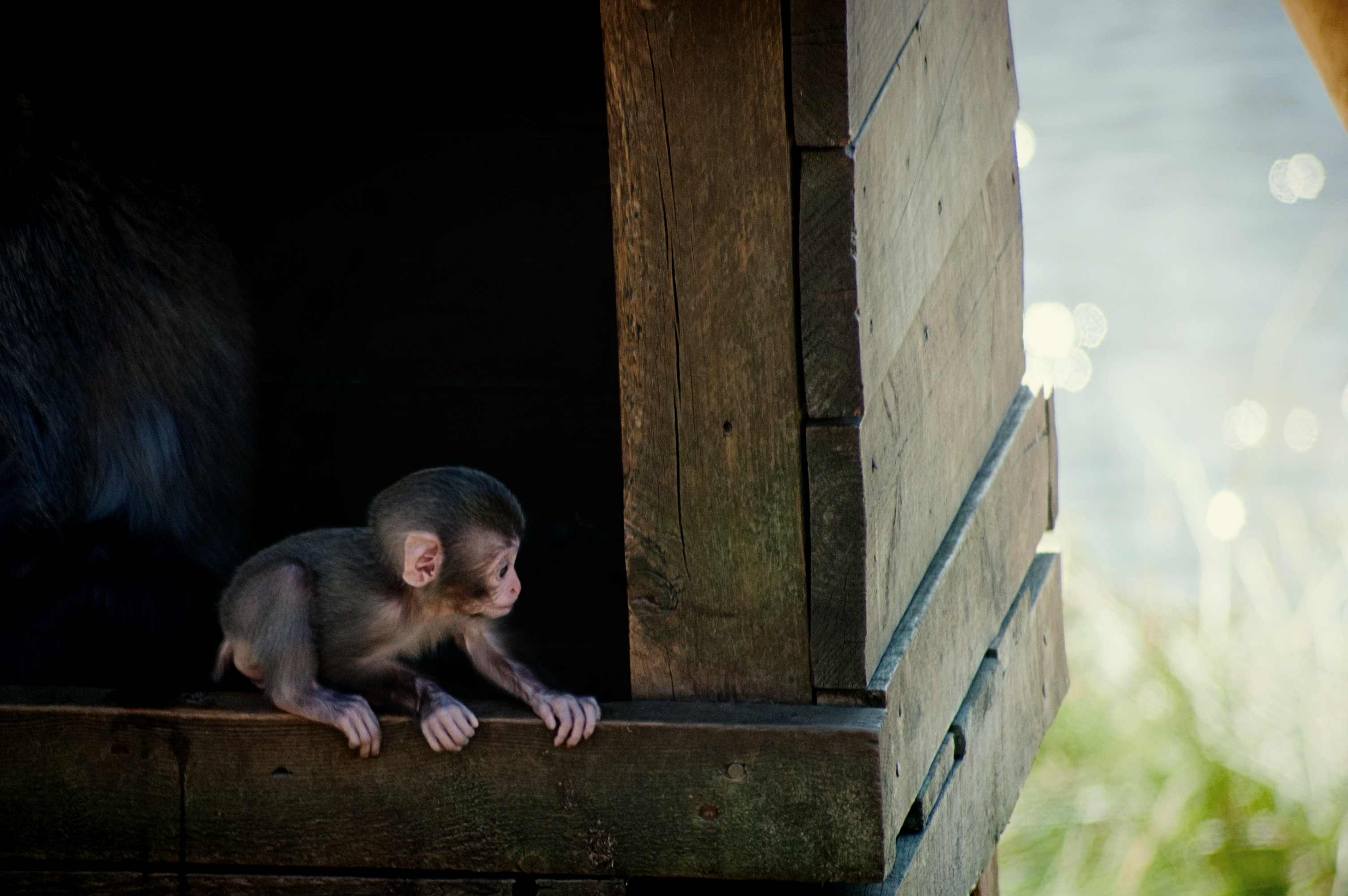
A young Japanese macaque, part of the colony at the Park.

- White lipped deer
- Scottish wildcat
- Himalayan monal
- Eurasian eagle-owl
- Northern lynx
- Common crane
- Eurasian wolf
- Polar bear
- Chinese goral
- Turkmenian markhor
- Red panda
- Great grey owl
- Arctic fox
- Japanese macaque
- Amur tiger
- Wolverine
- Amur leopard
- Finnish forest reindeer
- Mishmi takin
- Himalayan tahr
