= Children's Hour =

British BBC radio programme (1922–1964)

Children's Hour, initially The Children's Hour, was the BBC's principal recreational service for children (as distinct from "Broadcasts to Schools") which began during the period when radio was the only medium of broadcasting.

Children's Hour was broadcast from 1922 to 1964, originally from the BBC's Birmingham station 5IT, soon joined by other regional stations, then in the BBC Regional Programme, before transferring to its final home, the new BBC Home Service, at the outbreak of the second World War. Parts of the programme were also rebroadcast by the BBC World Service. For the last three years of its life (from 17 April 1961 until 27 March 1964) Children's Hour was no longer used, the programmes in its timeslot going out under the umbrella heading of For the Young.

The programme takes its name from the first verse of the poem by Longfellow: "Between the dark and the daylight, When the night is beginning to lower, Comes a pause in the day's occupations, That is known as the Children's Hour".

== Broadcast history ==
In the United Kingdom, Children's Hour was broadcast from 5 pm to 6 pm every day of the week.

It was founded by Cecil Arthur Lewis, or Uncle Caractacus, L. Stanton Jefferies, Rex Palmer and Arthur Burrows. From 1923 to 1934, the majority of listeners, few at all then, were part of "Radio Circles", clubs that maintained the BBC's connection to their audience. Birthday greetings were given out until 1933, excised due to overwhelming demand. In 1926 it was decided that the majority of presenters would drop the "Auntie" and "Uncle" from their titles.

Derek McCulloch, however, would retain his identity as "Uncle Mac". He was closely involved with the programme from 1929, and ran the department from 1933 until 1950, when he had to resign for health reasons. From 1928 to 1960, Children's Hour in Scotland was organised and presented by Kathleen Garscadden, known as Auntie Kathleen, whose popularity brought crowds to the radio station in Glasgow. By 1933 however, many of the local versions of Children's Hour were replaced by regional broadcasts of London production. The Scottish writer John Keir Cross was the producer of Children's Hour from 1941 to 1944.

From 1928 to 1960 Request Week determined what were the most popular Children's Hour programmes. Toytown was #1 for almost thirty years, with various popular choices trailing behind being Zoo Man, Jennings at School, Norman and Henry Bones (which ended Children's Hour), Out with Romany, Worzel Gummidge and Winnie the Pooh.

The programme's closure was decided in 1964 by Frank Gillard following an enormous decline in listenership, as by the end of 1963 the number of listeners had fallen to 25,000. Gillard said that most of them were "middle-aged and elderly ladies who liked to be reminded of the golden days of their youth", and that young listeners had instead turned to watching television, listening to the BBC Light Programme or to pirate radio. There was considerable complaint about the closing of the service and questions were raised in Parliament.

== Programmes ==
Among popular series on Children's Hour were:

Title	Author	First broadcast	Last broadcast	Notes
Winnie the Pooh	A. A. Milne	16 September 1927	23 April 1959	Cycle of stories from Winnie-the-Pooh and The House at Pooh Corner (broadcast irregularly)
Toytown	S.G. Hulme Beaman	19 July 1929 (adaptation of story from Tales of Toytown)	16 September 1964 (as Children's Hour)	29 stories written for radio (1929-1932) cycled monthly thereafter (except from 1941-1943)
Out with Romany	George Bramwell Evens	12 January 1934	2 November 1943	
Worzel Gummidge	Barbara Euphan Todd	10 December 1935	6 September 1952	Cycle of original stories by Todd (broadcast irregularly)
Mary Plain	Gwynedd Rae	17 February 1936	2 October 1945	Cycle of original stories by Rae; not broadcast 1940-1945
Norman and Henry Bones	Anthony C. Wilson	17 July 1943	9 April 1965	Written for radio
Cowleaze Farm	Ralph Whitlock	9 April 1945	13 September 1962	Written for radio
Nature Parliament	N/A	22 January 1946	29 December 1962	
Jennings at School	Anthony Buckeridge	16 October 1948	24 March 1962	Written for radio
Sherlock Holmes	Arthur Conan Doyle	15 October 1952	15 November 1957	Series 1-3 only
Tinker and Tapp, Inc.	Muriel Levy	19 November 1953	27 February 1962	Written for radio

== People ==
Among actors and presenters who were famous for their work on Children's Hour were:

- Peggy Bacon as producer and presenter ("Aunty Peggy") from 1947
- Arthur Burrows ('Uncle Arthur' - also the first London wireless Uncle)
- Violet Carson
- David Davis
- Norman Ellison, a.k.a. Nomad the Naturalist
- Rev George Bramwell Evens, a.k.a. Romany
- Carleton Hobbs
- Rupert Gould ('The Stargazer')
- Derek McCulloch ('Uncle Mac')
- Kathleen Garscadden ('Auntie Kathleen')
- Jon Pertwee
- Wilfred Pickles
- Alan Rothwell
- Tony Warren
- David Seth-Smith, a.k.a. The Zoo Man
- Olive Shapley
- Norman Shelley (Winnie-the-Pooh, Mr. Toad)
- Stephen King-Hall
- William Glynne-Jones
- Gladys Young

L. Stanton Jefferies composed music for some early programmes.
