= Rex Palmer =

British broadcaster (1896–1972)

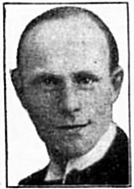
- Rex Palmer in 1923
- Born: Reginald Faithful Palmer; 16 February 1896; Lincoln, England
- Died: 12 October 1972 (aged 76); London, England
- Occupation(s): Radio broadcaster, record producer and company manager

Reginald Faithful "Rex" Palmer (16 February 1896 – 12 October 1972) was a British broadcaster. He was an early BBC Radio presenter who made programmes for children under the pseudonym "Uncle Rex", and sang on air as "Rex Faithful".

== Life ==
Palmer was born in Lincoln, England. In the First World War, he served with the Royal Flying Corps under Edmund Allenby in Palestine.

Palmer was the first London Station Director of 2LO, and was the first person appointed to the BBC's predecessor, the British Broadcasting Company, by John (later Lord) Reith, in November 1922. He became known as "The Golden Voice of Wireless". He presented children's programmes from 1923, and also presented concert programmes and sang as a baritone. On leaving the BBC in 1929, to join the Gramophone Company, he was described by the Evening News as "one of the original five members of the BBC".

On 11 October 1931, he introduced the first English-language radio programme in France, A Concert of His Master's Voice Records on Radio Paris, which was sponsored by the Gramophone Company and made by the International Broadcasting Company. At the Gramophone Company, where he rose to be general manager of the International Artistes' Department, he oversaw recordings for the label, by conductors and composers including Sir Edward Elgar and Arturo Toscanini. He left the Gramophone Company in 1940.

He also narrated films for British Pathé.

He rejoined the Royal Air Force (as it had become) in World War II, eventually becoming a Wing Commander.

Palmer returned to the BBC to present nostalgic programmes such as Those Were the Days and These Radio Times in the 1950s. He appeared as a castaway on the BBC Radio programme Desert Island Discs on 10 February 1958.

He died in London in 1972, aged 76, and was buried at Brompton Cemetery. In November 2008, his papers were auctioned by Bonhams.
