= Edinburgh Zoo =

Zoo in Edinburgh, Scotland

- Interactive map of Edinburgh Zoo
- 55°56′33″N 3°16′12″W
- Date opened: 22 July 1913
- Location: Edinburgh, Scotland, UK
- Land area: 82 acres (33 ha)
- No. of animals: 3218 (2022)
- No. of species: 171
- Annual visitors: 648,809 (2025)
- Memberships: BIAZA, EAZA, WAZA
- Major exhibits: Penguins, koalas, chimpanzees, sun bears, giraffes
- Website: www.edinburghzoo.org.uk

Edinburgh Zoo (Scottish Gaelic: Sù Dhùn Èideann), formerly the Scottish National Zoological Park, is an 82-acre (33 ha) non-profit zoological park in the Corstorphine area of Edinburgh, Scotland.

The zoo is positioned on the south-facing slopes of Corstorphine Hill, giving extensive views of the city. Established in 1913, and owned by the Royal Zoological Society of Scotland, it receives over 600,000 visitors a year, which makes it one of Scotland's most popular paid-for tourist attractions. As well as catering for tourists and locals, the zoo is involved in many scientific pursuits, such as captive breeding of endangered animals, researching into animal behaviour, and active participation in various conservation programmes around the world.

Edinburgh Zoo was the first zoo in the world to house and breed penguins. It is the only zoo in Britain to house Queensland koalas and, until December 2023, giant pandas. The zoo is a member of the British and Irish Association of Zoos and Aquariums (BIAZA), the European Association of Zoos and Aquaria (EAZA), the World Association of Zoos and Aquariums (WAZA), and the Association of Scottish Visitor Attractions. It has also been granted four stars by the Scottish Tourism Board. The zoo gardens boast one of the most diverse tree collections in the Lothians.

== History ==
The Royal Zoological Society of Scotland (RZSS) was founded as a registered charity in 1909 by an Edinburgh lawyer, Thomas Hailing Gillespie. The Corstorphine Hill site was purchased by the Society with help from the Edinburgh Town Council in early 1913. Gillespie's vision of what a zoological park should be was modelled after the 'open design' of Tierpark Hagenbeck in Hamburg, a zoo which promoted a more spacious and natural environment for the animals, and stood in stark contrast to the steel cages typical of the menageries built during the Victorian era. The design and layout were largely the product of Patrick Geddes and his son-in-law Frank Mears but Sir Robert Lorimer was involved in some of the more architectural elements including the remodelling of Corstorphine House at its centre.

The Scottish National Zoological Park was opened to the public in 1913 and was incorporated by Royal Charter later that year. In 1948, following a visit by His Majesty King George VI, the Society was granted the privilege of adding the prefix 'Royal' to its name. It remains the only zoo with a Royal Charter in the United Kingdom.

Edinburgh Zoo's long association with penguins began in January 1914, with the arrival of three king penguins from the Christian Salvesen whaling expedition which docked in Leith. The subsequent successful hatching of a king penguin chick in 1919 was the first penguin to be hatched in captivity. These were the first penguins to be seen outside of the South Atlantic anywhere in the world. The now famous daily penguin parade started by accident in 1950 with the escape of several birds. This proved so popular with visitors and the penguins that it was a daily feature of the zoo until stopped by first COVID and then avian influenza.

After Tom Gillespie retired, Gilbert D. Fisher was appointed director-secretary of the zoo in 1956. He held the post till he retired in 1971.

In 1986, the Society acquired the Highland Wildlife Park at Kingussie, 30 miles (48 km) south of Inverness. The zoo and the park work together in providing the most appropriate captive habitat possible in Scotland. Public visitation trips between both sites are organised frequently by the RZSS.

The zoo still retains the original charter, which drives its active breeding programme, and biodiversity, conservation and sustainability initiatives. The RZSS provides multiple ways for the public to help support its mission, including a membership club, animal adoption, donations, legacies and volunteering.

Starting in September 2020, BBC Scotland aired a documentary series about Edinburgh Zoo and the Highland Wildlife Park called Inside the Zoo.

== Animals and exhibits ==
=== Budongo Trail ===
Named after the Budongo Forest in Uganda, the Budongo Trail facility houses a troop of 13 chimpanzees; six males (Louis, Qafzeh, Paul, Frek, Liberius and Velu) and seven females (Lucy, Sophie, Lianne, Heleen, Kilimi, Edith and Masindi). The main building features viewing galleries, a lecture theatre and interactive games and displays designed to teach visitors about the chimpanzee's lifestyle and social structure.

=== Living Links ===
Living Links is built around a field station and research centre for the study of primate behaviour. The exhibit features enclosures housing common squirrel monkeys and tufted capuchins.

=== Monkey House ===
Is now closed for redevelopment (April 2024).

=== Penguins Rock ===
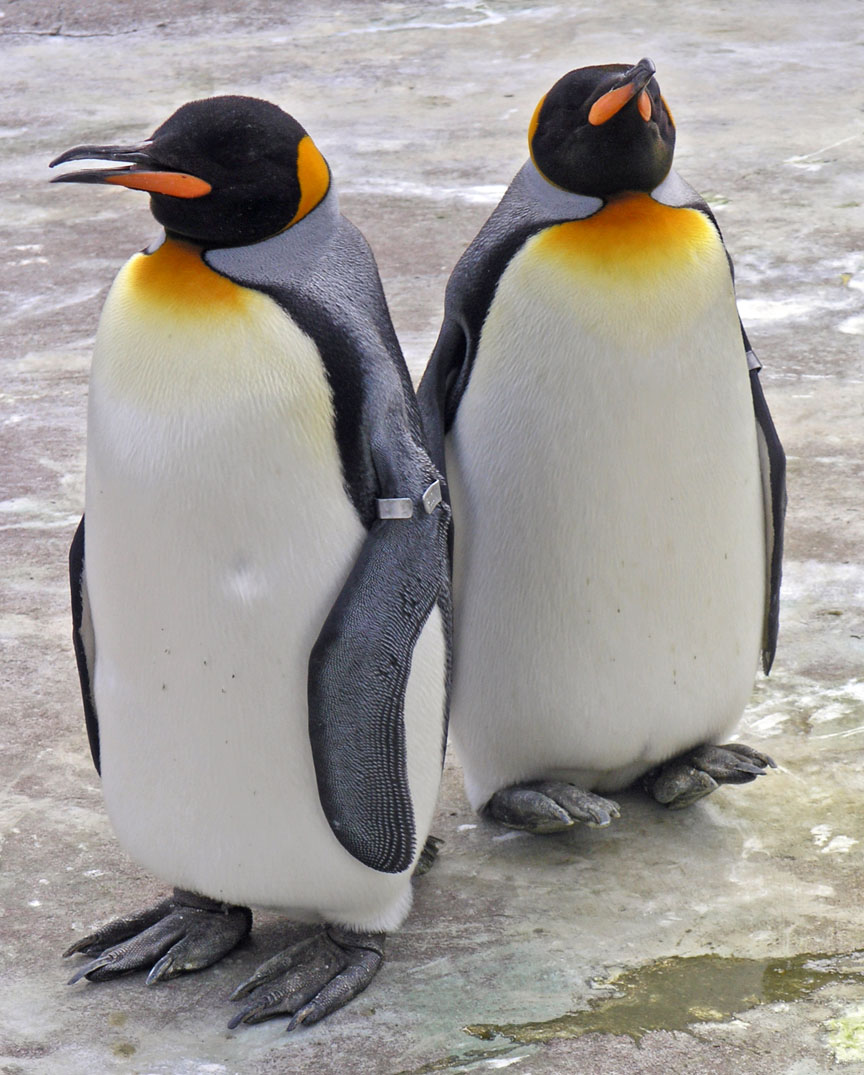
Two king penguins

Edinburgh Zoo is well known for housing penguins in its collection, the first three being king penguins, which arrived in January 1913. The zoo's current penguin pool, named "Penguins Rock", is 65 metres (213 ft) long, 3.5 metres (11 ft) deep at its deepest point, contains 1.2 million litres of water, and houses colonies of gentoo, king, and northern rockhopper penguins.

=== Giant pandas ===
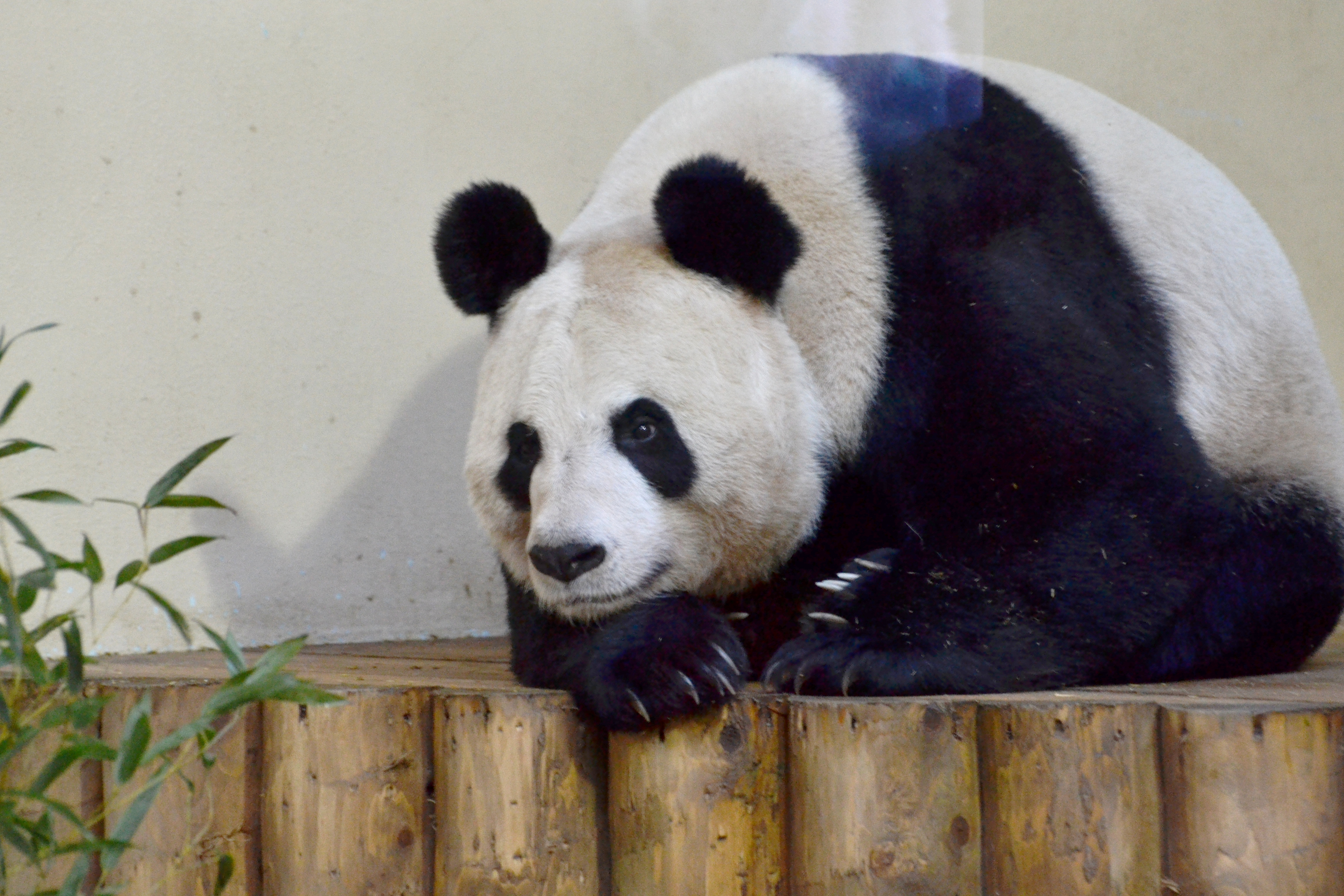
Tian Tian, the female giant panda, who came to the zoo with her male companion in late 2011, who then left in December 2023

In 2011, Edinburgh Zoo leased two giant pandas, a male named Yáng Guāng (陽光, meaning "sunshine", born 2003) and a female named Tián Tián (甜甜, meaning "sweetie", born 2003), from the Bifengxia Breeding Centre in China at a cost of $1m a year. The zoo spent £285,000 building an enclosure especially for the pandas. They were originally meant to remain at the zoo for a maximum of ten years before being returned to China, but in December 2021, it was confirmed that the pandas would remain in the zoo until the end of 2023. Edinburgh Zoo was, at the time, the only zoo in the United Kingdom that housed giant pandas. The pandas were flown back to China on 4 December 2023, the end of their time in the UK.

=== Magic Forest ===
Located near the sun bear habitat, the Magic Forest is a building that houses several smaller rainforest animals, including cotton-top tamarins, eastern pygmy marmosets, Goeldi's monkeys, gray-handed night monkeys, ground cuscuses and Northern Luzon giant cloud rats.

=== Sloths and Armadillos ===
Formerly Brilliant Birds, this walkthrough enclosure opened in September 2021 and tells the story of wildlife in South America. It houses a pair of Linnaeus's two-toed sloths named Nico and Feira, making Edinburgh Zoo currently the only zoo in Scotland to house sloths. It also houses two large hairy armadillos named Nymeria and Diogo.

=== Giraffe House ===
In 2019, Edinburgh Zoo announced the development of a new enclosure for giraffes, and launched a Crowdfunder campaign to raise money for the project. Construction of the giraffe house began in 2019, and it opened in June 2021. The zoo owns a bachelor herd of four male Nubian giraffes named Arrow, Gerald, Fennessy and Gilbert.

=== Wee Beasties ===
Opened in 2017, "Wee Beasties" is an indoor exhibit displaying some the zoo's smaller species, including blue poison dart frogs, axolotls, pancake tortoises, partula snails, Chilean rose tarantulas, and a coral reef tank containing tropical fish such as percula clownfish, Lamarck's angelfish and yellow tangs.

=== Koala Territory and Wallaby Out ===
Koala Territory was first opened in 2005, and currently houses two female koalas, Myaree and her cousin Talara. Koala Territory is decorated with Aboriginal-inspired artwork, and features a garden of eucalyptus plants.

Wallaby Outback is a walk-through exhibit next to Koala Territory housing swamp wallabies and western grey kangaroos, and was opened in 2015.

=== Animal Antics ===
A daily show in which keepers demonstrate the natural skills of animals to an audience of visitors. Keepers use positive reinforcement training with every animal, which means that the animals that are present at the talks are never forced. Because of this, the animals used in Animal Antics vary between shows.

=== Other mammals ===
Other notable mammal species in the zoo's collection include meerkats, red pandas, red river hogs, Kirk's dik-diks, L'Hoest's monkeys, Chinese gorals, Bagot goats, ring-tailed lemurs, red-bellied lemurs, buff-cheeked gibbons, pygmy hippopotamuses, Asian small-clawed otters, crowned lemurs, banteng, greater one-horned rhinoceroses, southern pudu, Azara's agoutis, sun bears, binturongs, Scottish wildcats, geladas, Visayan warty pigs, Visayan spotted deer, Przewalski's horses, Asiatic lions, Sumatran tigers, giant anteaters, Grévy's zebras, nyala, capybaras, cheetahs, sloth bears and two brand new Bactrian camels.

=== Roxie the red panda ===
Roxie was a red panda that lived at the zoo until her death in November 2024. Born in on 17 July the same year, she was one of five red pandas at Edinburgh zoo. Her death was caused by a reaction to fireworks set off during the city's bonfire celebrations. The Royal Zoological Society of Scotland, who run the zoo, announced that veterinarians believe her death was caused by choking on her own vomit after the noise of fireworks caused her stress. A contributing factor to this might have been the loss of her mother five days earlier, which may have also been pyrotechnic related.

Despite fireworks being banned in the majority of Edinburgh, areas around the zoo were omitted. The tragic event led to renewed calls for stricter rules around the use of fireworks, including a public petition signed by over one million and a statement from the RZSS itself.

=== Other birds ===
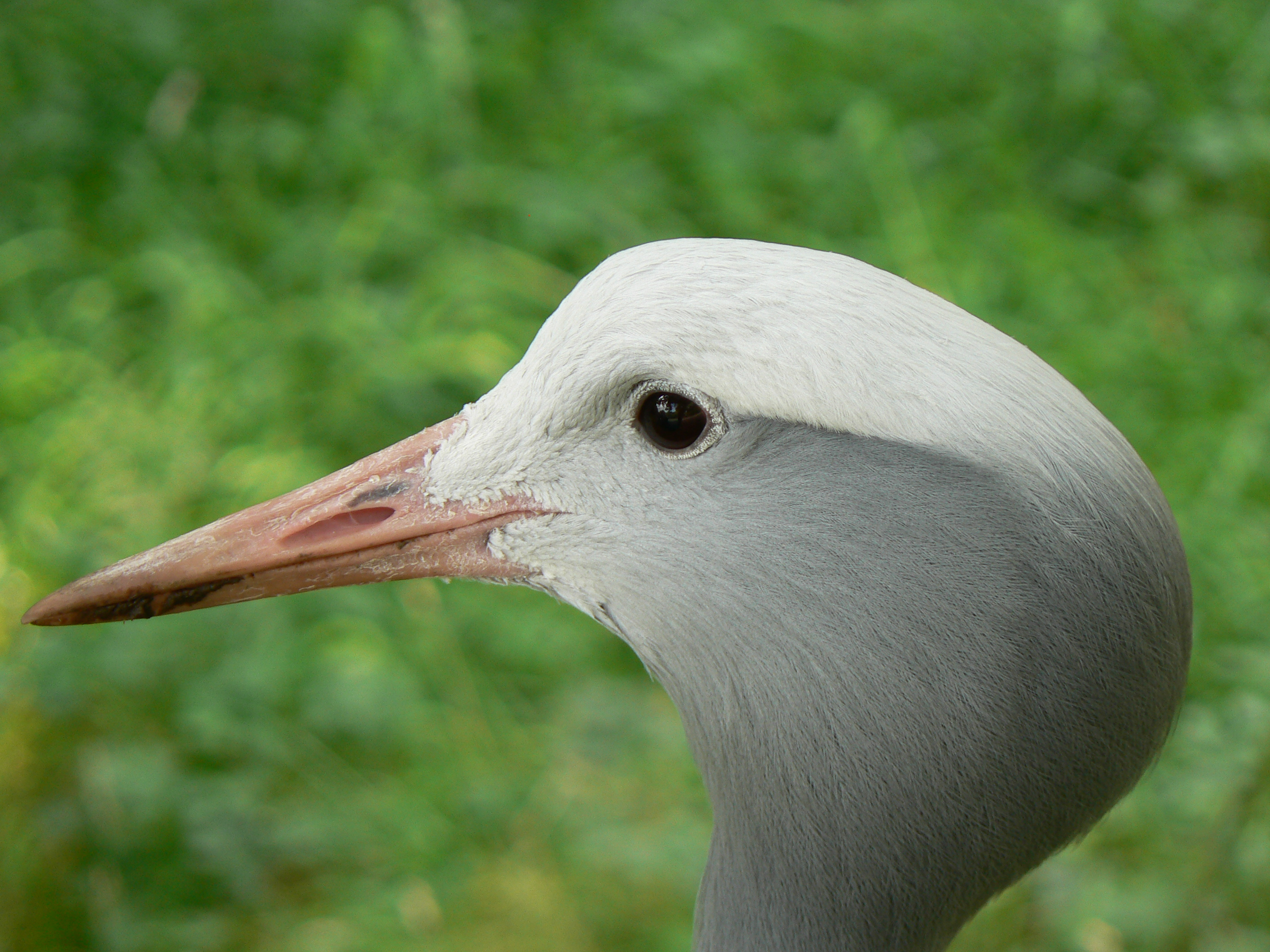
A Stanley crane

Other notable bird species in the zoo's collection include Chilean flamingos, waldrapp ibis, black storks, great white pelicans, East African crowned cranes, vulturine guineafowl, southern cassowaries, red-fronted macaws and Egyptian vultures.

=== Military animals ===
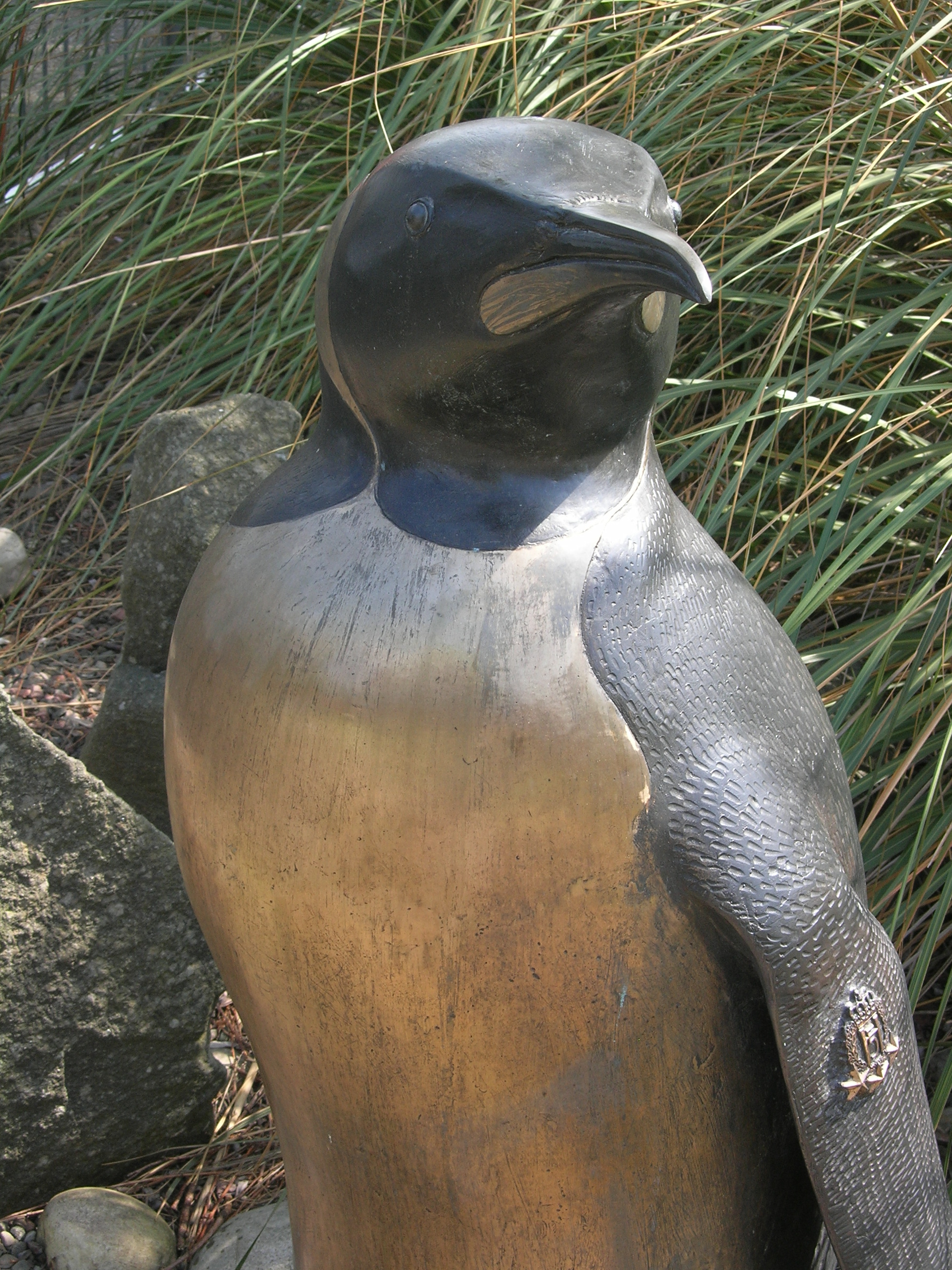
A statue of Nils Olav

Some of the zoo's animals have held military rank.

- Wojtek was a bear adopted in Iran by the Polish II Corps and enlisted into the 22nd Artillery Supply Company to allow him to travel when the troops were posted. He served in the Middle East and during the Battle of Monte Cassino and retired to Edinburgh Zoo when the Polish troops, billeted in Scotland, demobilised.
- Sir Nils Olav, a king penguin, was the mascot and Colonel-in-Chief of the Norwegian King's Guard. He was adopted in 1972 when the King's Guard were in the city for the Edinburgh Military Tattoo, given the rank of visekorporal (lance corporal), and promoted each time the corps visited the city. He died in 1987 and his successor, Nils Olav II, inherited his rank. Nils was visited by the Norwegian King's Guard on 15 August 2008 and awarded a knighthood. The honour was approved by the King of Norway, King Harald V. During the ceremony a crowd of several hundred people joined the 130 guardsmen at the zoo to hear a citation from King Harald the Fifth of Norway read out, which described Nils as a penguin "in every way qualified to receive the honour and dignity of knighthood".

== Future developments ==
The giraffe house is intended to be the first of five large scale projects the zoo is planning as part of the "Edinburgh Zoo's Big 5" initiative, these include updated enclosures for the sun bears, rhinoceros and king penguins, as well as a new tropical house with free-roaming monkeys and birds.

== Research and conservation ==
Edinburgh Zoo is home to a primate behavioural research centre, Living Links. Living Links consists of a field station and research centre that was developed in a partnership with the University of St Andrews. The centre houses capuchin monkeys and squirrel monkeys originating from the forests of South America, and offers researchers opportunities to study primate behaviour.

Budongo Trail, a chimpanzee enclosure, was opened in May 2008 by The Princess Royal. Budongo Trail is a naturalistic enclosure which can house up to 40 chimps. It includes a large outdoor area and three separate indoor areas for the chimps together with observation areas and a lecture theatre for the public. The RZSS is the principal sponsor in the long-term study and conservation of a group of approximately 60 chimpanzees as part of the Budongo Conservation Field Station in Uganda, Africa. Amidst the opening of Budongo Trail, Jane Goodall described it as a "wonderful facility" where primates "are probably better off [than] living in the wild in an area like Budongo [Forest], where one in six gets caught in a wire snare, and countries like Congo, where chimpanzees, monkeys and gorillas are shot for food commercially."

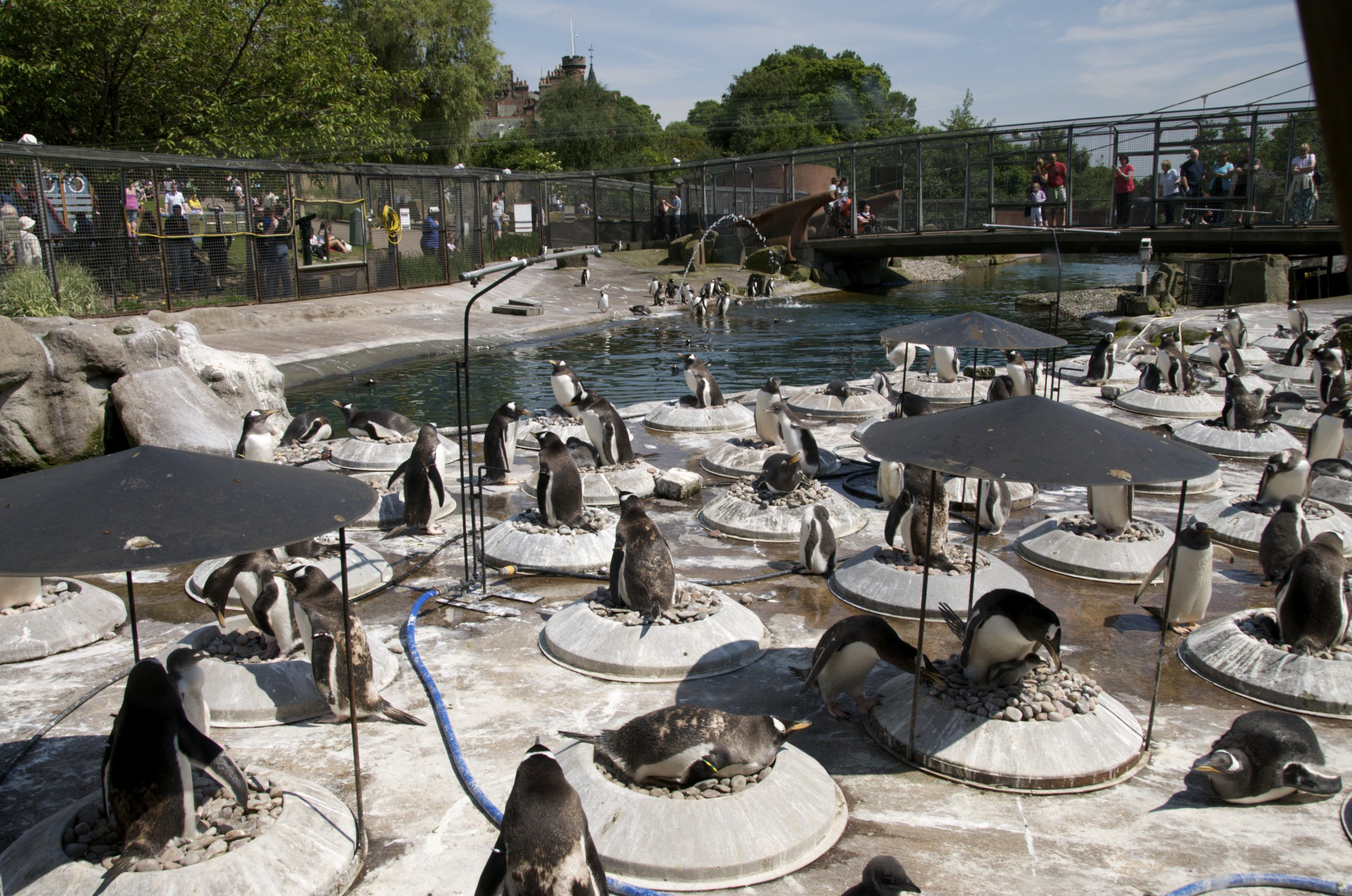
Gentoo penguins – adults and chicks

In July 2006, a cull of invasive brown rats on the Scottish island of Canna was deemed a provisional success and after two years of observation, during which time no rats were observed, the island was declared officially rat free by the Environment Minister, Mike Russell on 7 June 2008. The rats had been outcompeting the rare local wood mouse, known as the Canna mouse and also endangering local seabird populations. The National Trust for Scotland which own the island invested £500,000 employing exterminators from New Zealand to cull the estimated 10,000 brown rats. in co-operation with RZSS, approximately 150 Canna mice were captured and homed at Edinburgh Zoo and the Highland Wildlife Park. 40 mice were returned to the island in late 2006 with the remaining being re-introduced in stages.

In May 2008, a joint application submitted by the Royal Zoological Society of Scotland (RZSS) and the Scottish Wildlife Trust (SWT) was approved by the Scottish Government allowing for a trial reintroduction of the European beaver to the Knapdale Forest in Mid-Argyll. If the trial is successful then the European beaver will be the first mammal to be reintroduced to the United Kingdom. Beavers have been extinct in Scotland since the 16th century, when they were hunted for their pelt, meat and medicinal properties (use of castoreum).

== Zoo gardens ==
Before being acquired by the society, the Corstorphine hill site was a nursery, once owned by Thomas Blaikie, who planted many of the great French parks such as 'La Bagatelle'. On this site two nurserymen raised the famous apple cultivars 'John Downie' and 'James Grieve'. Today, the zoo has one of the most diverse tree collections in the Lothians with 120 species. The south-facing aspect allows bananas to be grown outside. Increasingly, horticulture is seen as a discipline in its own right, with the focus on habitat creation within enclosures, food stuffs for the animals, and enrichment for both the animals and the visiting public.

== Controversies ==
Organisations that remain critical of Edinburgh Zoo's work include the Animal Liberation Front, who have voiced their distaste for the quality of the enclosure that formerly housed polar bears. The Born Free Foundation has also stated several times that the zoo fails in its conservation work, as well as opposing the zoo's plans to house elephants.

Edinburgh Zoo received a public backlash on Twitter after the European Endangered Species Programme (EEP) recommended that they should cull three red river hog piglets after an unplanned birth. A protest took place under the #savethehogs tag on Thursday 3 February 2011. The Twitter campaign was started by OneKind, with major support from Captive Animals Protection Society. On Friday 4 February 2011, it was announced that the #savethehogs campaign had been successful and the zoo would attempt to re-home the piglets. The zoo also came under criticism for plans to charge £20 per person for visitors to watch the necropsy of an animal. A OneKind spokesman criticised the idea, largely due to the timing of the event, which was scheduled to take place two months after the zoo announced a £2 million loss in profits, making the necropsy seem like a "Money-making drive".

Following various internal issues and allegations relating to senior staff, the zoo was subject to investigations relating to its charitable status. The Office of the Scottish Charity Regulator (OSCR) held an inquiry into the Royal Zoological Society of Scotland, and one director was fired while two others were suspended. The zoo suspended its chief operating officer and acting chief executive Gary Wilson while it investigated allegations made against him. In February 2012, the zoo was told to conduct a full review of its financial controls following an inquiry into complaints about how the zoo was run in 2011. The report by the OSCR cleared the zoo of misconduct but found "areas of governance that could be improved".

=== Animal escapes ===
In July 2011, the zoo's monkey house had to be closed after a gelada escaped from its enclosure. The animal vaulted an electric fence as it tried to escape whilst visitors looked on.

In May 2012, several hundred zoo visitors were forced to seek shelter after a family of red river hogs escaped from keepers and ran amok. Those who had taken refuge in the monkey house later described scenes where zoo workers pursued the animals with various equipment including brushes and dart guns. Though the drama lasted over an hour, the adult hogs were recaptured unharmed.

In August 2012, a scarlet ibis escaped from the zoo and went on the loose in the city after a squirrel had chewed a hole in the netting at the top of the cage. Keepers noticed the ibis was missing and later that day the bird was spotted more than 3 miles away in Dundas Street, near the city centre. The ibis was missing for nearly a week before being recaptured four miles from the zoo.

In September 2012, zoo customers were escorted indoors when a Heck bull escaped from his enclosure. The 600 kg animal with three feet long horns was loose for over 40 minutes, until zoo workers and vets managed to restrain him by using tranquilliser darts.
