= Royal Zoological Society of Scotland =

Scottish learned society and registered charity

- Founded: 1909; 117 years ago
- Founder: Thomas Haining Gillespie
- Type: Non-profit organization
- Purpose: Edinburgh Zoo; Highland Wildlife Park
- Location: Edinburgh, Scotland, UK
- Website: www.rzss.org.uk

The Royal Zoological Society of Scotland is a learned society and registered charity based in Edinburgh, Scotland. It was founded by Thomas Haining Gillespie in 1909. In 1913, Edinburgh Town Council bought a large plot of land on Corstorphine Hill for the society - this later opened to the public as Edinburgh Zoo. The society received its Royal Charter in 1913. The principal objective of the society mentioned in the original charter is:

To promote, facilitate and encourage the study of zoology and kindred subjects and to foster and develop amongst the people an interest in and knowledge of animal life.

In 1986, the society acquired the Highland Wildlife Park in Kingussie, Inverness-shire.

== See also ==
- History of Edinburgh Zoo
- List of organisations in the United Kingdom with a royal charter
- List of zoo associations
- Office of the Scottish Charity Regulator
- Scottish Wildlife Trust
