= List of sovereign states by male to female income ratio =

The following list sorts countries by their estimated male to female income ratio according to the Gender Development Index of the United Nations. The ratio is determined by comparing the gross national income per woman with the gross national income per man in 2023.

* indicates "Gender inequality in COUNTRY or TERRITORY" links.

2023 Gross National Income per capita (2021 USD PPP) by country and gender
Country	Male	Female	Ratio
Yemen	1,877	137	13.673
Iraq	22,332	2,909	7.677
Iran *	27,375	4,433	6.176
Syria *	6,688	1,149	5.822
Jordan *	15,296	2,745	5.572
Egypt *	27,143	5,077	5.346
Sudan *	4,742	909	5.217
Algeria *	24,554	5,284	4.647
Palestine	10,806	2,339	4.619
Afghanistan *	3,198	721	4.433
Morocco *	13,990	3,221	4.344
Pakistan *	8,724	2,173	4.014
Saudi Arabia *	69,767	20,287	3.439
Oman *	48,793	15,311	3.187
Djibouti *	9,690	3,101	3.125
Tunisia	18,092	6,063	2.984
India *	13,273	4,543	2.922
Bahrain *	70,143	24,461	2.868
Lebanon *	16,829	6,068	2.773
Somalia	2,156	790	2.729
Sri Lanka *	18,637	6,970	2.674
Mauritania	9,038	3,604	2.508
Kuwait *	73,825	29,510	2.502
Fiji	18,235	7,531	2.421
Qatar *	125,739	54,169	2.321
Mali *	3,257	1,409	2.312
United Arab Emirates *	89,116	39,172	2.275
Mauritius	37,829	16,738	2.260
Libya *	27,282	12,125	2.250
Bangladesh *	11,820	5,280	2.239
Turkey *	47,535	21,513	2.210
Western Samoa	8,150	3,724	2.188
Myanmar *	6,731	3,122	2.156
Senegal	5,686	2,665	2.133
Costa Rica	31,586	15,436	2.046
Indonesia	18,284	9,073	2.015
Uzbekistan	11,759	5,840	2.013
Nepal *	6,390	3,185	2.007
Kyrgyzstan *	8,080	4,120	1.961
Nicaragua *	9,161	4,676	1.959
Maldives	23,702	12,134	1.953
Burkina Faso	3,153	1,634	1.930
Guatemala	16,454	8,528	1.929
Guyana	61,804	32,865	1.881
Mexico *	28,611	15,410	1.857
Tajikistan	7,504	4,051	1.852
Malaysia *	41,670	22,512	1.851
Venezuela *	9,323	5,040	1.850
North Macedonia	28,957	15,663	1.849
Gabon	24,269	13,264	1.830
Cuba	10,900	5,994	1.819
Tuvalu	8,957	4,963	1.805
Romania	51,116	28,345	1.803
Congo	7,591	4,214	1.801
Chad	2,245	1,248	1.800
El Salvador *	13,795	7,699	1.792
Philippines *	13,732	7,744	1.773
Rwanda *	3,824	2,159	1.771
Marshall Islands	9,161	5,186	1.766
Bosnia and Herzegovina	25,622	14,574	1.758
Guinea *	4,460	2,550	1.749
Italy	67,001	38,437	1.743
Suriname	21,958	12,734	1.724
Switzerland	103,808	60,385	1.719
Ethiopia	3,531	2,056	1.717
Cape Verde	10,259	5,998	1.710
China *	27,580	16,257	1.696
Micronesia	5,348	3,157	1.694
Trinidad and Tobago	33,937	20,212	1.679
Chile	35,091	21,087	1.664
Argentina	32,386	19,464	1.664
Greece	45,015	27,068	1.663
Malta	64,528	38,808	1.663
Brunei	93,032	56,315	1.652
Mongolia *	18,386	11,204	1.641
Serbia	29,012	17,781	1.632
Czech Republic	56,992	35,089	1.624
Cameroon	5,870	3,629	1.618
Comoros	4,295	2,657	1.616
Haiti	3,627	2,256	1.608
Belize *	15,179	9,453	1.606
Brazil	22,268	13,886	1.604
Grenada	17,645	11,030	1.600
Ivory Coast	8,253	5,161	1.599
Japan *	59,059	37,017	1.595
South Korea *	61,120	38,370	1.593
Timor-Leste	6,661	4,188	1.590
Ukraine *	21,120	13,295	1.589
Uruguay	35,387	22,306	1.586
Nauru	23,930	15,192	1.575
Great Britain *	66,576	42,538	1.565
Poland	51,802	33,206	1.560
Liechtenstein	203,518	130,593	1.558
Paraguay	18,555	11,930	1.555
South Africa *	16,755	10,794	1.552
Palau	19,156	12,385	1.547
Dominican Republic	26,730	17,368	1.539
Bhutan	16,531	10,750	1.538
Georgia	25,515	16,596	1.537
Montenegro	34,173	22,325	1.531
Hungary	45,425	29,682	1.530
Tonga *	9,081	5,957	1.525
Kiribati	6,009	3,949	1.522
Russia *	47,866	31,728	1.509
Hong Kong *	85,162	56,528	1.507
Bulgaria	38,916	25,852	1.505
Croatia	50,066	33,291	1.504
Albania	21,211	14,123	1.502
Saint Lucia	25,106	16,790	1.495
Niger *	1,895	1,276	1.485
Slovenia	55,248	37,398	1.477
Armenia	24,445	16,566	1.476
Jamaica	12,002	8,153	1.472
Slovakia	44,016	29,901	1.472
Honduras *	7,199	4,914	1.465
Peru *	17,053	11,653	1.463
Madagascar *	1,965	1,345	1.461
Germany *	76,218	52,189	1.460
Latvia	45,664	31,383	1.455
Belgium	75,533	51,965	1.454
Austria	75,395	51,929	1.452
Spain	54,633	37,689	1.450
United States *	87,081	60,085	1.449
Lesotho *	3,592	2,495	1.440
Iceland	81,199	56,441	1.439
Belarus	31,904	22,205	1.437
Cambodia *	5,832	4,067	1.434
Ireland	107,271	74,819	1.434
Canada *	64,494	45,016	1.433
Colombia	22,035	15,384	1.432
Laos	9,507	6,691	1.421
Luxembourg	100,195	70,537	1.420
Netherlands	80,307	56,539	1.420
Malawi *	1,925	1,356	1.420
Kenya	6,586	4,641	1.419
Kazakhstan	36,485	25,774	1.416
Lithuania	49,587	35,072	1.414
Guinea-Bissau	2,820	1,996	1.413
Liberia *	1,798	1,279	1.406
New Zealand *	55,285	39,338	1.405
Uganda *	3,201	2,280	1.404
Australia *	68,116	48,588	1.402
Denmark	88,753	63,412	1.400
Barbados	20,313	14,577	1.393
Seychelles	33,419	23,994	1.393
Sierra Leone *	1,992	1,437	1.387
France *	64,286	46,383	1.386
Estonia	47,825	34,599	1.382
Norway	130,573	94,569	1.381
Vanuatu	3,940	2,857	1.379
Sweden	76,391	55,665	1.372
Tanzania *	4,062	2,977	1.365
DR Congo	1,650	1,215	1.358
Bolivia *	10,874	8,010	1.357
Finland *	65,803	48,533	1.356
Eswatini	11,447	8,446	1.355
Azerbaijan *	23,803	17,656	1.348
Namibia	12,555	9,353	1.342
Israel *	55,089	41,075	1.341
Antigua and Barbuda	31,453	23,694	1.327
Panama	39,169	29,598	1.323
Togo	3,237	2,470	1.311
Cyprus	51,361	39,336	1.306
Singapore	125,389	96,100	1.305
Papua New Guinea *	4,475	3,436	1.302
Ghana	7,736	5,958	1.298
Vietnam	14,711	11,422	1.288
Benin	4,279	3,329	1.285
Mozambique	1,523	1,198	1.271
Ecuador	15,649	12,333	1.269
Angola *	7,425	5,854	1.268
Portugal *	46,152	36,435	1.267
Burundi	955	764	1.250
Zimbabwe *	3,915	3,145	1.245
Solomon Islands	3,072	2,469	1.244
São Tomé and Príncipe	6,192	4,982	1.243
San Marino	71,829	57,818	1.242
Nigeria *	6,126	5,001	1.225
Zambia	3,768	3,132	1.203
Thailand *	22,519	18,717	1.203
Gambia	3,065	2,561	1.197
Botswana	18,444	15,531	1.188
Bahamas	33,132	28,999	1.143
Moldova	16,853	15,025	1.122
