= Abortion Under Apartheid =

Book by Susanne M. Klausen

- Cover
- Author: Susanne M. Klausen
- Original title: Abortion Under Apartheid: Nationalism, Sexuality, and Women's Reproductive Rights in South Africa
- Language: English
- Subject: History of medicine, African studies, Women's rights in apartheid-era South Africa
- Genre: Non-fiction
- Publisher: Oxford University Press
- Publication date: November 19, 2015
- Publication place: United States
- Pages: 327
- Awards: Joel Gregory Prize for best book in African Studies (2016); Canadian Women's History Book Prize (2016)
- ISBN: 978-0199844494

Abortion under Apartheid: Nationalism, Sexuality, and Women's Reproductive Rights in South Africa is a 2015 monograph by historian, author, and academic Susanne M. Klausen. The book explores the politics of abortion in South Africa during the apartheid era (1948–1994), revealing the criminalization of abortion and the flourishing clandestine abortion industry. Klausen discusses the authoritarian government's attempt to regulate white women's reproductive sexuality to maintain white supremacy. The book highlights the 1960s-1970s battle for abortion rights, involving doctors and feminists calling for legal reform, and emphasizes the disproportionate, harmful impact on Black girls and women lacking access to safe abortions. The author portrays the resilience of women, both tragic and triumphant, in shaping their reproductive destinies amid societal opposition.

== Overview ==
The book traces the struggle for abortion rights from the 1960s to the early 1990s (when apartheid in South Africa ended). It stresses the intersection of class and race in women's access to safe abortion services, emphasizes the lingering challenges, highlights the lack of a widespread feminist movement during this period and closely examines the impact of a 1972 case involving a medical abortionist named Dirk Crichton and an untrained abortionist named James Watts, contributed to the introduction of a restrictive abortion law. Klausen explores how the apartheid era, marked by extreme racism and oppression of women, influenced the perception and regulation of abortion. The book also explores clandestine abortion, reproductive injustice, white female sexuality, and the intersection of gender and the state during apartheid.

The book sheds light on the overlooked aspect of Afrikaner nationalism's role in controlling women's sexuality during apartheid in South Africa. It explores the oppressive impact on women of all races, revealing their varied responses to illegal abortions and the racial disparities in options. There was a limited early involvement of feminist organizations in the abortion rights movement, starting in the 1970s. The highly restrictive Abortion and Sterilization Act of 1975 targeted white women, leading to abortion tourism, while Black women and girls were forced to turn to clandestine backstreet abortion providers until the newly elected African National Congress (ANC) greatly liberalized abortion law in 1996.

The work contains interviews with significant historical actors including Derk Crichton and James Watts, who underwent legal trials in the early 1970s for their involvement in providing illegal abortions to white teenagers and young women. Additionally, the book provides the complete English text of the 1975 Abortion and Sterilization Act.

Klausen stresses that despite progressive legislation in post-apartheid South Africa, challenges persist in ensuring safe and affordable abortion access—mainly due to stigma, resource constraints, and insufficient public health education.

== Critical reception ==
Alicia Decker (Note: From The Pennsylvania State University) described it as "a book about gender and the state—how gendered ideas about women and femininity figured prominently in government policy and practice."

Helen Dampier (Note: From Leeds Beckett University) commended Klausen's detailed and sensitive exploration of attitudes and experiences surrounding abortion, calling for the connection of reproductive rights to broader social justice.

In her review, Lesley A. Hall (Note: Research Fellow at the Wellcome Library) wrote: "This study makes a powerful case that concerns over restricting abortion were about policing women's bodies within a conservative patriarchal community in order to maintain its reputation, one is tempted to say, 'honour'."

Marc Epprecht (Note: From Queen's University) said the book "sheds powerful light on the interplay of abortion policy and the defence of white male supremacy in apartheid South Africa which still resonates there and more widely."

Rachel Berger (Note: From Concordia University) wrote: "Klausen examines a series of trials and a shifting culture of outspokenness on the part of the women upon whom abortion was performed that worked to undo the specter of punitive legality."

== Prizes ==
The book won two major prizes and was shortlisted for a third award. It won the 2016 Joel Gregory Prize for best book in African Studies (published in 2014 and 2015), awarded by the Canadian Association of African Studies, and the 2016 Canadian Women's History Book Prize, for best scholarly book (published in 2014 and 2015), awarded by the Canadian Committee on Women's History. It was also shortlisted for the 2016 Wallace Ferguson Prize by the Canadian Historical Association for best scholarly book on a non-Canadian topic.
