= Gender inequality in South Africa =

Gender inequality and discrimination remain significant issues in South Africa, despite the country's progressive constitution and various policy initiatives aimed at promoting gender equality. The societal norms, economic disparities, and systemic challenges that perpetuate gender inequality and discrimination are deep-rooted issues. The situation in South Africa remains challenging because society still reflects a patriarchal and stereotypical mindset. Cultural and traditional norms are still at liberty to restrict women from attaining senior professional positions, access to higher education, access to proper healthcare, and more.

== Gender inequality in the workplace ==
Equal employment opportunities for women are a goal of the current democratic system. Besides the constitution, there are other legislative measures put in place to promote women’s emancipation. This legislation includes the Labour Relations Act 66, the Basic Conditions of Employment Act 75, and the Employment Equity Act 55. These provide the basis for the advancement of women to achieve gender equality in employment. South Africa has implemented vast statutory measures to promote gender equality and eliminate unfair discrimination in the workplace. However, due to historical inequalities, a lack of dedication to correcting power dynamics and granting women greater autonomy to hold managerial roles, and a lack of funding and programs for women's empowerment to obtain skills, women continue to face disadvantages in the workplace. Equality in the workplace appears to be largely a concept on paper with little impact on women's realities. Gender equality is still far from being achieved, as women occupy less than 50% of senior management positions.

== Gender inequality in education ==
Although there have been improvements in access to education for girls, challenges persist. Rural areas and historically disadvantaged communities often face inadequate infrastructure, including schools and sanitation facilities. The South African Journal of Child Health found that in South Africa, 7 million girls are reported to be absent from school each month due to a lack of sanitary pads, which results in them missing 25% of learning during the school year. This disproportionately affects girls, who may be more likely to face cultural and economic barriers to education.

Mathebula et al.’s 2022 study found that 5% of girls aged 14 to 19 got pregnant between the years 2018 and 2019. Adolescent pregnancy adds continual deterrents for young South African girls to complete school. Trying to attempt childbearing or raising children, alongside pursuing an education is difficult, and often leads to girls dropping out of school entirely. Additionally, for some, this dual-responsibility is not an option, as pregnancy can be the means for punitive action or a forced discontinuation of education. Adolescent pregnancy disproportionally impacts girls in disadvantaged or lower socioeconomic circumstances, as they may have less access to contraception, healthcare, and are more at risk of participation in transactional sex.

Girls from underprivileged homes face more pressure to drop out of school as familial caregiving responsibilities persist regardless of financial struggles or academic progress. Girls often are expected to serve as the caregiver as their familial responsibility; caring for the children, tending to the men, as well as cooking and cleaning for the house. This role can be a large responsibility for young girls, and make pursuing an education more difficult, especially when balancing familial financial struggles.

== Cultural and traditional practices that reinforce gender inequality ==
The values and ideas that members of a community have held for extended periods of time, often generations, are reflected in traditional cultural practices. In South Africa some of these damaging practices consist of; premature and forced marriages, widowhood rites, virginity tests, female genital mutilation, and breast sweeping and ironing. Non-physically invasive practices such as Lobola or arranged marriages may also reinforce gender stereotypes. It is often found that women themselves subscribe to these discriminatory practices. But there is also unequal access to decision-making roles in cultural professions.

=== Premature, Forced, and Arranged Marriages ===
Premature and forced marriages, also known as the Xhosa word, “Ukuthwala,” which translates as ‘to carry,’ is closely related to Lobola, which refers to forced marriages. Ukuthwala is the word for the practice of girls being abducted, often against their will or under coercion, forced into marriage, and then assumably raped. The abduction often is carried out by a group of men, with the future husband being one of them, and can targets girls as young as 12 to 15 years old. Following the abduction the future husband negotiates with the girl’s family on a lobola, or bride price, where reaching an agreement amounts to an arranged marriage, but a disagreement amounts to the girl’s return home. Ukuthwala is predominantly practiced in the Eastern Cape Province, but can be seen present in other South African tribes as well. The practice is still ongoing, as Ukuthwala, lobola, nor forced marriage is explicitly mentioned in Section 12 of the Children's Act which prohibits social, cultural, and religious practices that are detrimental to a child’s health or wellbeing. Currently, there are very minimal government acknowledgements on the practice, and it’s opposition to basic human rights.

=== Virginity Testing ===
Virginity tests are an examination of female genitalia, to see if the hymen, a membrane stretching across the vaginal opening, is intact. Hymens that are intact indicate virginity, whereas those not intact indicate not being virginal. These tests originally were performed by mothers or aunts to the subject, but has now been passed off to elder community members, often being performed in large, public spaces. Virginity testing, while not necessarily accurate as one’s hymen can break from activities outside of sex, directly violates women and girls’ right to privacy, under Section 14 of the Constitution. Additionally, these tests are being used to categorize women and girls in their purity and dignity.

=== Female Genital Mutilation ===
Female genital mutilation (FMG) is cultural practice of sealing and/or removing parts of female genitalia in an effort to preserve fertility, chastity, and fidelity. There are multiple ways FGM can be performed, ranging in the extremity of removal and/or incisions made to the genitalia. The procedure is commonly performed on girls under the age of 18, and is often justified as a religious requirement or cultural tradition that can be reversed once ready for childbearing. However, this practice directly violates numerous constitutional human rights. The right to not be subjected to torture or to cruel, inhumane, or degrading treatment, the right to freedom and security, and the right to bodily and psychological integrity are just a few.

== Gender-based violence ==
Gender-based violence is a profound and widespread problem in South Africa, impacting almost every aspect of life. Gender-based violence, which disproportionately affects women and girls, is systemic and deeply entrenched in institutions, cultures, and traditions in South Africa.

South Africa is considered to be the rape capital of the world. The 1998 South Africa Demographic and Health Survey found that 1.6% of women had been persuaded or forced into sexual acts before the age of 15. The study additionally found that the majority of these assaults had occurred between the ages of 10 and 14, with over 85% of them constituting as rape. The article highlighted Western Cape, Mpumalanga and Gauteng as provinces with the highest rape statistics. It has been found that women aged 14 to 19 were twice as likely as women 45 to 49 to report instances of rape or sexual assault. As well as that women that lived in urban areas, were white, higher educated, or higher socioeconomic standing were more likely to report instances.

South Africa had five times the global average for the number of women killed by intimate partners. Gender-based violence emerges in society as a result of conventional gender role expectations and unequal power relations between genders. Physical, emotional, psychological, financial, and structural harm are just a few of the ways that gender-based violence can appear. Typically, intimate partners, co-workers, strangers, and even institutions are the ones who commit these acts that disproportionately affect women.

The difference between rape and coerced sex in relationships is difficulty distinguished. Often times, it is perceived that being in a relationship constitutes consent in sexual acts. Due to this, non-consensual and coerced sex has become increasingly prominent in many relationships. In fact, in Abrahams et al.’s 1999 study, 15% of men had reported to raping or attempting to rape a previous female partner in the 10 years prior to the study. Cultural norms about gender play a large role in this, as men are often expected to be dominant and women to be submissive. These norms create the bounds for men to decipher consent, and women’s say to often be overlooked.

== Reproductive Rights ==
=== AB v. Minister of Social Development ===
The policy in South Africa for surrogacy, under Section 294 of the Children’s Act, instates that commissioning parents must use their own gametes in conception under surrogacy. Which bars women with infertile eggs to use the method of surrogacy for procreation. In the case of AB vs Minister of Social Development, AB argued that this section of the Children’s Act was discriminatory to women, like herself, who were infertile, ultimately restricting procreative freedom. In this court, the Minister for University of Pretoria’s Centre for Child Law denied AB’s proposed change to the act. Leaving the policy to remain that the prospective child bore by the surrogate must have a genetic link to at least one parent, and if that parent was single, a direct link was necessary. At the end of the 2016 case, AB lost, leaving single infertile women disproportionately discriminated against in their access to reproductive healthcare.

== See also ==
- Domestic violence in South Africa
- History of women's rights in South Africa
- Women and Gender Equality Bill in South Africa
