= Role of women in the Nicaraguan Revolution =

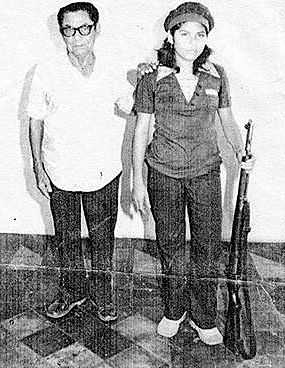
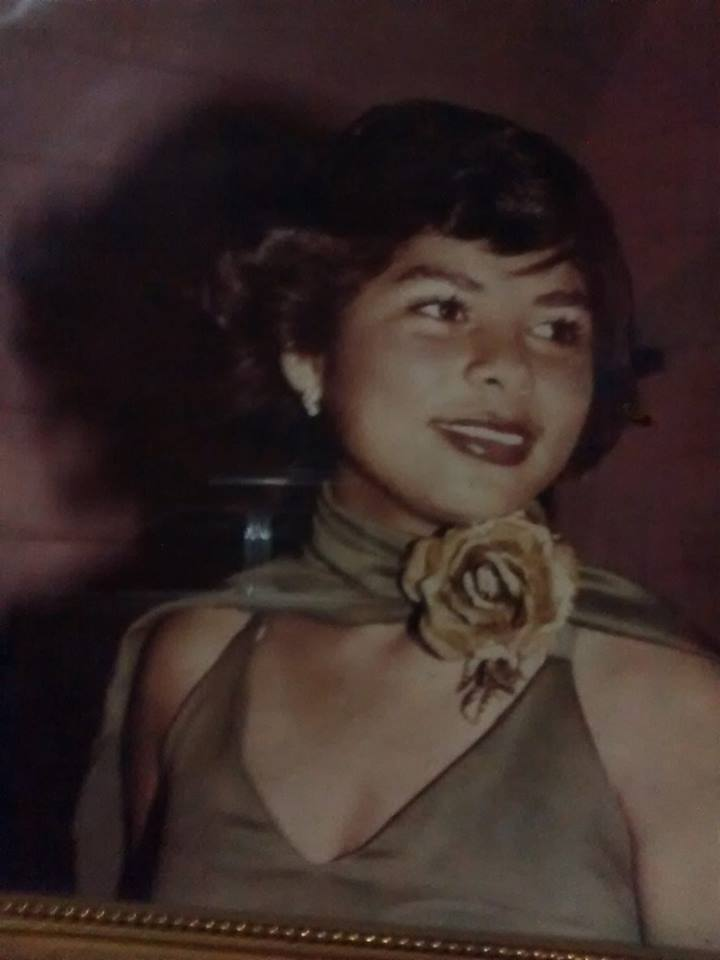
Lucía Fuentes, a soldada from León, pictured as a combatant and civilian

Women played a role in the Nicaraguan Revolution. Those who joined the Sandinista movement during the revolution fought for freedom from the Somoza dictatorship and to advance gender equality in the country.

There was an emergence of women as active participants and leaders. Many women joined the ranks of the Sandinistas as the armed struggle in Nicaragua started in 1967. Women also fought against the Sandinistas by joining the Contra movement. Both these groups worked together to generate reform in Nicaragua.

It is estimated that women made up approximately 25 to 30 percent of the FSLN. Although many women were armed combatants, one record shows that women accounted for only 6.6% of Sandinista deaths, suggesting that there was an effort to help keep them safe.

Women also participated on the counterrevolutionary side, both during Somoza's regime and afterward (as Contras), although in fewer numbers.

== Description ==
Women on both sides of the revolution were involved in many roles, including: soldiers, organizers, communications, providing for their homes for their female comrades’ protection, and persuading their boyfriends and husbands to join the revolution.

A change in gender relations was limited due to the process being shaped by the values and priorities of the Sandinista government rather than by the main women's organization such as the AMNLAE (Asociacion de Mujeres Nicaraguenses Luisa Amanda Espinosa), which resulted in the victory of the opposition candidate Violeta Barrios de Chamorro, over the incumbent Daniel Ortega in the 1990 election that ended the revolution.

The women were empowered to challenge any attempts that would reduce them back to the domestic role. Chamorro's portrayal of women reinforced rather than challenged the politics of gender equality in Nicaragua.

== Feminist ideology ==
The women in Nicaragua during the Sandinista Revolution saw their way of life drastically change. Women became involved as guerrilla fighters in the overthrown of the Anastasio Somoza García regime, as many women mobilized to assist the FSLN bring about the revolution.

Early in the revolution, the FSLN made the emancipation of women one of its top goals. With the assistance with their partner and the predominant women's organization AMNLAE (Asociacion de Mujeres Nicaraguenses Luisa Amanda Espinosa), the FSLN made significant progress towards this goal. Specifically, the Sandinistas prohibited the use of women as sexual objects; the female body could not be used to sell products in Nicaragua. The Sandinistas promoted breast feeding and made legalized breaks for working women to do so, eliminated the distinction between children born in and out of wedlock, banned the former "family wage" that saw male heads of households receive the wage of his wife and children's labor, and established penalties to suppress prostitution. They required that men and women shared the household duties including child care. This requirement came in the form of a "nurture law," which mandated that men were responsible for half of whatever their child needed—education, upbringing, support, clothing, etc.—until they reached eighteen.

Nicaraguan feminists were not able to find a voice through AMNLAE, who they saw as more feminine than feminist, thus many feminists cut their ties with what they see as a right-wing organization and began advocating for gender equality on their own. This became increasing difficult during the Contra war when AMNLAE, the FSLN, and other independent women shifted their focus away from emancipating women and towards winning the war. The reluctance for AMNLAE to explicitly pursue the anti-sexism agenda and the subsequent acceptance of more traditional roles for women and families by the FSLN was largely responsible for the outcome of the 1990 elections.

In 1990, Violeta Chamorro, representing the United Nicaraguan Opposition (UNO), was elected into office. This was not only a defeat for the FSLN and revolutionaries but for the Nicaraguan feminists. Because neither AMNLAE nor the FSLN explicitly challenged the sexist controversies, they subsequently fell to a much more traditional and conservative party led by a woman president fulfilling the typical gender-roles that Nicaraguan feminists felt that women desperately needed to dismantle during the revolution.

Many organizations attempted to work their way around the lack of political support for women's rights since many of the laws stayed the same after the Sandinista government. This change in leadership caused economic hardship for many women that had to support their families. While one of the goals of the Sandinistas was to suppress prostitution, this new economic struggle only made matters worse and many women used prostitution as a way to help support their families. The Catholic Church was also involved as they preferred more traditional roles for women, especially relating to abortion. This is because of the strong ties between the Catholic Church and the government in Nicaragua. The Sandinistas helped legalize abortion, but much of that progress was taken back after they lost power. Within 5 years of the new leadership, hospitals stopped being allowed to carry out abortions.

== Women in the armed struggle ==
The women in revolutionary Nicaragua played a significant, uncharacteristic role in the revolution as guerrillas in the armed forces, subsequently challenging their traditional roles as mothers and primary caregivers. It was naturally more difficult for women to assume roles in guerrilla warfare because of the traditional patriarchal system put in place by the Roman Catholic Church. Their role in reproduction did not align well with these activities. Their initial entry point into the public sphere as guerrillas was a precursor to women's further involvement in more political revolutionary events and agendas. Women of all ages and socioeconomic backgrounds joined both sides of the conflict: as part of the revolutionary Sandinista forces and the counter-revolutionary Contra forces. Women joined the FSLN to challenge the Somoza regime for many reasons, which in essence surrounded the issue of the political repression of Nicaraguan women and Nicaraguan youth in particular. The FSLN began integrating women into their guerrilla forces in 1967. Unlike other left-wing guerrilla groups in the region, the Sandinistas espoused progressive views on gender equality, believing that winning women's support and participation in the revolution would strengthen it and lead to greater success. This led women to align with the Sandinistas and to receive additional support from the young Sandinista women who wanted to revolt against the Somoza regime. Groups such as Las Mujeres del Cuá, supported the Sandinistas and often included old women, adolescent women, and young children.

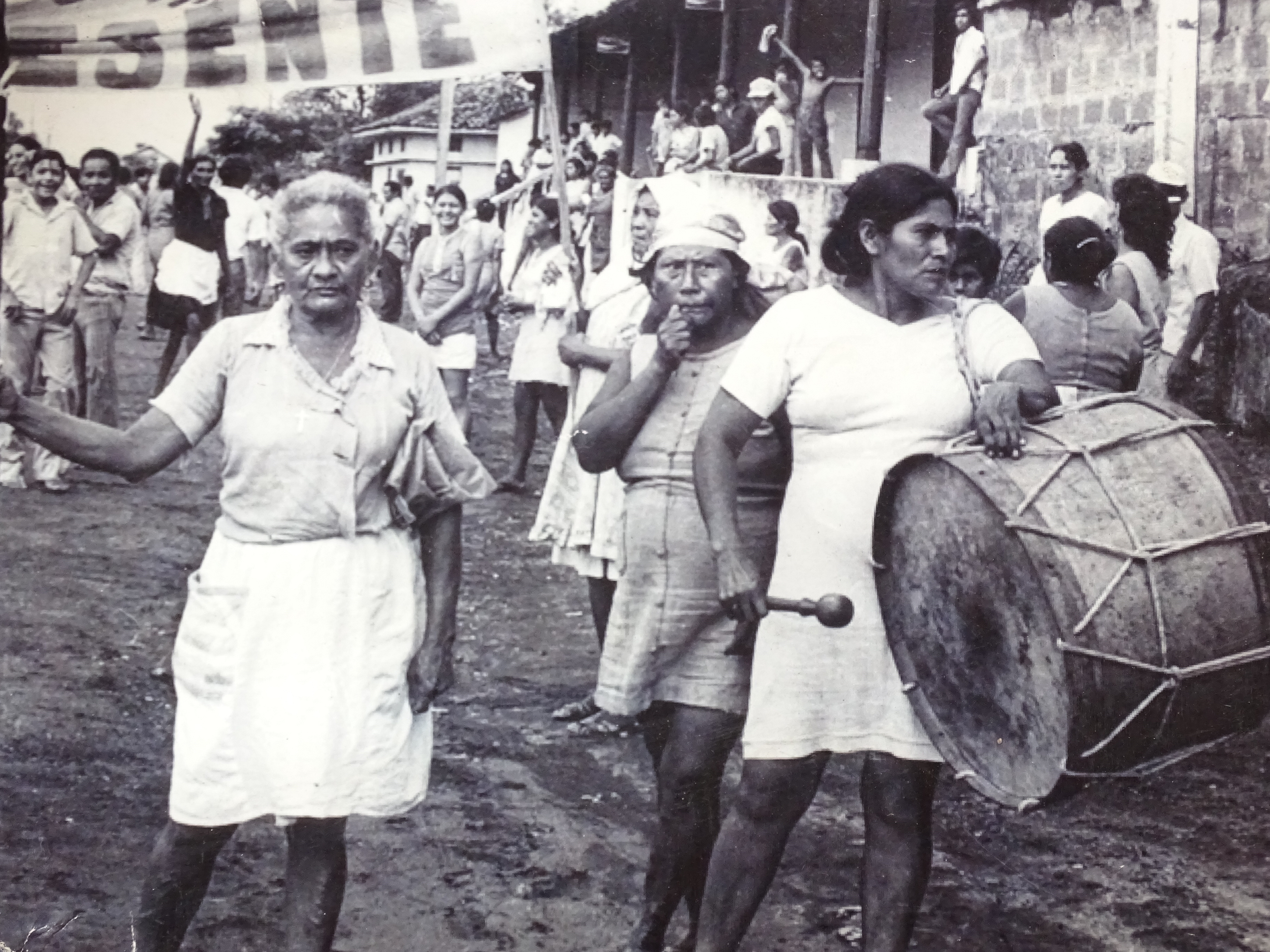
Women participating in the revolution (1970)

Women among the FSLN were encouraged to participate in every aspect of combatant and civilian life as equals to their male counterparts. Women had their own battalions which marched in rallies organized by the FSLN such as the one held in 1979 in the town of Carazo. Women were required to carry forty pound backpacks, and men were required to engage in traditionally-female tasks such as food preparation. Although men heavily outnumbered women in the leadership positions within FSLN ranks, women consisted of approximately 25 to 30 per cent of the members.

Similarly, the National Guard also had women among its ranks, active as police officers as well as in the EEBBI, the Somoza regime's special forces. These women also saw combat actions against the guerrillas.

Luisa Amanda Espinoza was the first Sandinista woman to be killed in battle, she was one of the revolutionary role models. Espinoza, before joining the ranks of the FSLN, was a poor urban woman who had left her abusive husband. Surviving many dangerous missions, she was killed after being betrayed by an informant. Her name was later incorporated to the Nicaraguan women's association, AMNLAE (Asociacion de Mujeres Nicaraguenses Luisa Amanda Espinosa) in commemoration of her role in the revolution.

Sandinista women, largely supported by the major women's organization of the time, AMNLAE, fought to preserve the revolution and continue the fight for women's emancipation by maintaining the Feminist Ideology During the Sandinista Revolution. The AMNLAE provided women with legal aid if they needed it for child support cases or divorce, and helped women who were being mentally or physically abused. The association also had a journal for women with information on women's bodies, birth control, pregnancy, and their menstrual cycles as well as political information in a form that was easy to read as many of the women were not fully literate. Their lowered levels of education are likely due to their responsibilities in the home and unequal access to education, perpetuating the inequality.

== Agrarian Reform ==
Shortly after Sandinista victory, the government put into place the Nicaraguan agrarian reform law which was the first in Latin America to specifically incorporate women. The reform did not require the recipient of the land to be the head of household, which was traditionally a man. Even before laws such as this one, where exceptions were made for widows, it was still extremely difficult for women to receive land. In one town, women made up 80% of the cooperative as a result of men refusing to join. Cooperatives saw that groups with men and women worked more effectively and were more stable than groups of men alone. Banks noticed that cooperatives with women were more dependable with their payments. Women often showed more general interest in the more behind the scenes processes such as learning new techniques, and learning about different crops. In interviews of some cooperatives, the roles of women were seen as equally important as the roles of men. In one cooperative, there is a child care complex and this is partly due to the men holding more reproductive responsibility in the family as their wives also farmed the land and were very active members outside the home. Women's involvement in agrarian reform has improved overall economic inequality for women.

== Literacy Campaign ==
Women were highly involved in the improvements in education in Nicaragua during the revolution. The Sandinista's Literacy Campaign was largely run by women. About half of the people in Nicaragua were illiterate in 1979. The fresh Sandinista government started a campaign to teach people how to read and education them on politics in Nicaragua. 800,000 Brigadistas, or literacy teachers, planned to reach 400,000 people and teach them to read. The effective campaign reached so many people that the illiteracy rate leveled out at about 12% after 5 months of the campaign.

== Female counter revolutionaries ==
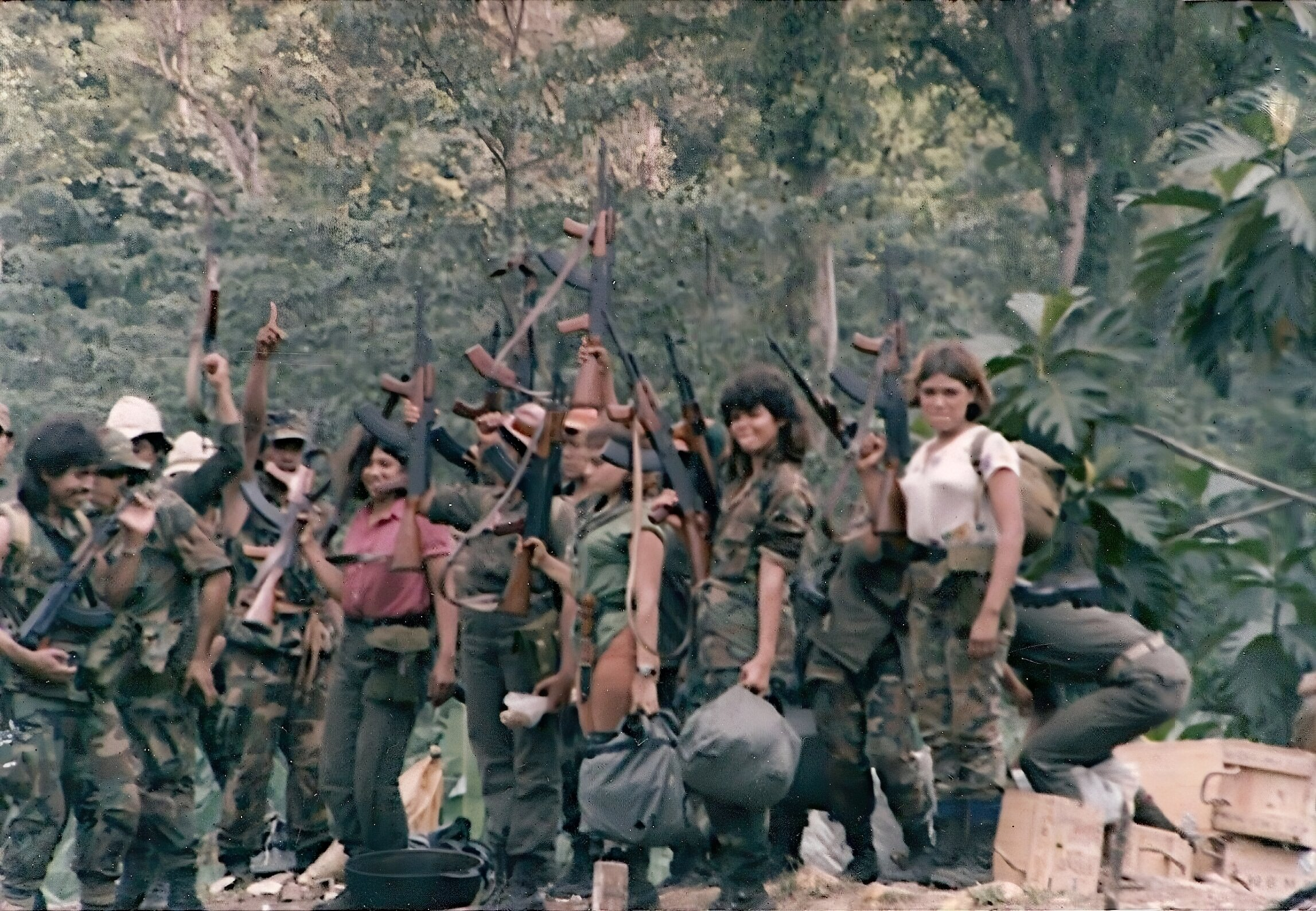
Female commandos in the Contras in 1987

Nicaraguan women participated as part of the counter-revolutionaries or Contras for many reasons. Many joined as part of a general native uprising by Amerindian people mistreated by the Sandinistas, others were former left-wing Sandinista supporters disaffected with the regime. However, all of the reasons women had for adopting counter revolutionary positions stem from personal experiences rather than purely ideological reasons. Specifically, many women joined because of the men in their lives and the political decisions they made. It is estimated that seven percent of the Contras were women.

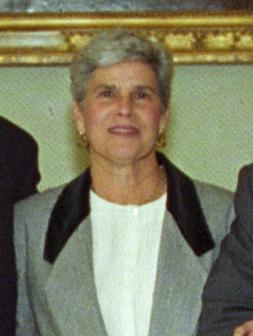
Violeta Chamorro

Similar to the organizations made by Sandinista women, the female members of the Contras created organizations to aid women who had lost husbands and children in the conflict. The Committee of Mothers of the Resistance (Comité de Madres de la Resistencia) was formed to obtain war pensions from the government. The women of the Sandinista and Contra movement worked together. In 1993, groups of Sandinista and Contra women merged to form an organization with the goal to attempt reconciliation; the organization was called the Association of Mothers and Victims of War. This organization managed to obtain pensions for a small number of women. It also funded and completed joint development projects.

These development projects included a self-help housing project, food aid packages, and a construction cooperative. The housing project, El Progreso, built 26 houses for Mothers of the Resistance and 26 houses for Sandinista women. In the construction cooperative, women learned how to make bricks and build latrines. The organization also received funding from a German agency. This allowed them to buy a house where they could hold meetings, workshops, and courses for women. The excess money was used to fund other initiatives such as: a credit fund, art classes for children, and training courses for women with disabilities in beauty therapy, floristry, baking, and dressmaking.

== See also ==
- Contras
- Dora María Téllez
- Gender equality in Nicaragua
- List of Nicaraguans
- Nicaraguan Revolution
- Violeta Chamorro

== Sources ==
- Chinchilla, Norma Stoltz. "Feminism, Revolution, and Democratic Transitions in Nicaragua" in The Women's Movement in Latin America: Participation and Democracy (2nd ed). Ed. Jane S. Jaquette. Boulder: Westview Press, 1994. 177-196.
- Chinchilla, Norma Stoltz. Revolutionary Popular Feminism in Nicaragua: Articulating Class, Gender, and National Sovereignty. Gender and Society 4 (1990): 370-397.
- Cupples, Julie. “Between Maternalism and Feminism: Women in Nicaragua’s Counter-Revolutionary Forces.” Bulletin of Latin American Research 25, no. 1 (2006): 83–103.
- Heumann, Silke. “The Challenge of Inclusive Identities and Solidarities: Discourses on Gender and Sexuality in the Nicaraguan Women’s Movement and the Legacy of Sandinismo: Gender and Sexuality in the Nicaraguan Women’s Movement.” Bulletin of Latin American Research 33, no. 3 (July 2014): 334–49. https://doi.org/10.1111/blar.12103.
- Kampwirth, Karen. Feminism and the Legacy of Revolution: Nicaragua, El Salvador, Chiapas. Athens: Ohio University Press, 2004. 19-46.
- Kampwirth, Karen. "Women in the Armed Struggles in Nicaragua: Sandinistas and Contras Compared" in Radical Women in Latin America: Left and Right. Eds. Victoria Gonzalez and Karen Kampwirth. University Park, Pennsylvania: The Pennsylvania State University Press, 2001.
- Kampwirth, Karen. “The Mother of the Nicaraguans: Dona Violeta and the UNO’s Gender Agenda.” Latin American Perspectives 23, no. 1 (1996): 67–86.
- Mendez, Jennifer Bickham. “Organizing a Space of Their Own? Global/Local Processes in a Nicaraguan Women’s Organization.” Journal of Developing Societies 18, no. 2–3 (June 1, 2002): 196–227. https://doi.org/10.1177/0169796X0201800209.
- Metoyer, Cynthia Chavez.(2000) Women and the State in Post-Sandinista Nicaragua. Colorado: Lynne Rienner Publishers, Inc.
- Molyneux, Maxine. "Mobilization without Emancipation? Women's Interests, the State, and Revolution in Nicaragua". Feminist Studies, 11.2 (1985) 227-254.
- Santos, Maria, and Barbara Alpern Engel. “Women in the Nicaraguan Revolution.” Frontiers: A Journal of Women Studies 7, no. 2 (1983): 42–46. https://doi.org/10.2307/3346284.
