= Gender equality in Nicaragua =

Nicaragua ranks highly among Latin American countries in gender equality. The World Economic Forum ranked it 18th in the Global Gender Gap Index. The country ratified the Convention on the Elimination of All Forms of Discrimination against Women (CEDAW), which aimed to promote women's rights, on 27 October 1981. However, Nicaragua has not ratified the Optional Protocol to CEDAW related to individual complaint procedures.

The Human Development Report ranked Nicaragua 106th out of 160 countries in the Gender Inequality Index in 2017. It reflects gender-based inequalities in three dimensions: reproductive health, empowerment, and economic activity. Women in Nicaragua are more likely to face poverty than men, and rates of violence against women remain high, with reports indicating persistent impunity despite existing laws.

World Bank's Gender Data Portal observes the labour force participation rate for women at 51.3%, compared to 81.8% for men, noting that in the lower middle-income group, the gap is lower in Nicaragua. In 2016, women in the low income bracket accounted for 65 percent, while men accounted for 80 percent. The middle-income bracket accounted for 46 percent of women, and 77 percent of men. The high-income bracket accounted for 52 percent of women, and 69 percent of men. A gender pay gap exists between men and women in Nicaragua. Furthermore, women spend significantly more time on unpaid domestic and care work than men, restricting economic participation.

When it comes to farming, there is inequality amongst men and women. In 2016, 8.5 percent of women were employed in agriculture, compared to 42.9 percent of men. Men tend to own more land than women in Nicaragua. In rural Nicaragua, 65 percent of women work on land they do not own. As more men owned land in Nicaragua, and ownership is linked to authority, programs in the 1990s sought to provide more women with the opportunity to own land.

Political participation by Indigenous and Afro-Descendant women on violence against women in Nicaragua has been beneficial to addressing and bringing to light violence against women. These works have promoted women's rights by telling their stories, and improved equality for women in Nicaragua.

== History ==
Throughout history, the role of women in Nicaragua has been deeply traditional and therefore deeply unequal. Men and women held different social roles and were expected to adhere to common stereotypes, namely men working and the woman responsible for the household. This was largely due to the concepts of marianismo and machismo, two prevalent forms of Latin American cultural behavior. According to marianismo and machismo, regardless of class, women don't possess the same legal rights as men. Additionally, women are subordinates of fathers and husbands, not allowed to make their own decisions. At the same time, women have to uphold the morality of the family and are responsible for its spiritual development and well-being.

Men were exempt from those duties and not legally obliged to acknowledge and support children or support their families financially.

Out of those circumstances, the rate of female-headed families was several times higher than nowadays.

Overall, women were less educated, had fewer financial resources, were employed in less-skilled, lower-paying jobs and had fewer civil and legal rights than men.

The women's movement is deeply intertwined with Indigenous and Afro-descendant struggles for land rights and regional autonomy along Nicaragua's Caribbean coast. To stand against state-led developmentalism and patriarchal norms, feminist activists united around class, gender, and sovereignty. They formed coalitions that remain despite political retreat. According to recent studies, women's constitutional rights remain restricted by a family-centric ideology.

=== Change through the revolution ===
The lives of women in Nicaragua didn't change until the Sandinista Revolution that started in 1979. In 1987, it was reported that 67% of 'active members' in the militia were women. Before the movement, topics like domestic violence and sexual abuse were taboo and not viewed as injustice by society. As a result of the revolution, changes in gender discourses, policies and programs promoted by the Nicaraguan women's movement, beginning with the Luisa Amanda Espinoza Association of Nicaraguan Women (AMNLAE), occurred in the early 1980s and continued with an autonomous women's movement in the 1990s. The Sandinistas' reforms in family law, their discourse on women's emancipation and the promotion of the New Man as a proper family man were meant to pave the way for the modern role of women in Nicaraguan society. This decision led to conflicts as men saw their dominant position threatened, which extended the process until the end of the 1990s, when international fundings and a neoliberal government prioritized establishing a new female figure. After the revolution, the Sandinista National Liberation Front party became the most powerful party, making the multiparty constitutional republic a single-party state. The country still faces increasing societal violence against women and violent attacks against the LGBT community, to which police fails to respond.

== Equality in health care ==
The degree of health care for women in Nicaragua depends on whether they live in rural or urban areas. Overall, the percentage of births attended by skilled health staff was 88% (as of 2012 or earlier). The number of pregnant women receiving prenatal care grew steadily over the past years, amounting to 94.7% in 2012. The maternal mortality ratio is at 0.15%, according to data from 2015. However, since the total ban on abortion enacted in 2006, access to sexual and reproductive health services has deteriorated significantly, contributing to high maternal mortality rates, particularly from unsafe abortions, according to reports by organizations like the Bertelsmann Transformation Index and Human Rights Watch. Barriers related to infrastructure, cost, and cultural norms also persist, especially in rural areas.

In 2012, a mother's mean age at first birth was 19.2 years.

Female life expectancy is 8.6% higher than that of men.

== Political and public representation ==
In 1963, women received the right to vote.

With the participation in the revolution, women began to have a voice in political decisions, originally their motivation was the will to protect their families.

"Everything that we did was for our children so that they could learn to read, so they could have a better life, then we, with this idea, participated in the Revolution. With the idea that they were going to learn to read, that they were going to learn many things that they didn't know, with this we integrated in the process of the Revolution," Ser madre en Nicaragua (Being a Mother in Nicaragua) 22.

The Nicaraguan Institute for Women (INIM) became independent in 2007.

In 2017, 45.7 percent of parliamentary seats were held by women, which is the highest rate in all middle-American countries. As of early 2024, this figure was reported even higher, at 53.9% by UN Women. However, under the increasingly centralized and authoritarian nature of the government since 2007, multiple sources report that high numerical representation has not translated into genuine political influence or the advancement of independent women's rights agendas. Furthermore, women activists and civil society organizations advocating for women's rights have faced significant repression and closure, particularly since 2018, according to organizations like FIDH and the IACHR.

== Legal situation ==
In 1994, Nicaragua signed the Declaration on the Elimination of Violence against Women.

In 2012, Nicaragua passed the Comprehensive Law Against Violence Towards Women (Ley Integral Contra La Violencia Hacia Las Mujeres, Ley 779), which strengthens the protection of victims and creates an avenue for women to seek justice in such cases of violence against women. This law represented a significant step by recognizing gender-based violence as a violation of human rights and focusing on systemic discrimination. However, reports indicate that enforcement is weak, a climate of impunity persists, and the law's impact has been undermined by state narratives prioritizing traditional family values and lack of judicial independence. Moreover, a total ban on abortion, removing prior therapeutic exceptions, was enacted in 2006 and remains in force. Recent laws (e.g., cybercrime law, foreign agents law enacted in 2020) have also been used to curtail freedom of expression and the work of women's advocacy groups.

== Gender and economy ==
Since the 1990s, structural adjustment efforts, privatization, and a decline in formal-sector employment have all had a significant impact on Nicaraguan women's economic circumstances. The neoliberal policies that were put into place after 1990 disproportionately hurt women, who were among the first to be forced out of public-sector positions and into dangerous informal labor markets. Due to market saturation and decreasing purchasing power among low-income households, many women tried to make ends meet by starting small enterprises from home, usually selling food, clothing, or household goods. However, these endeavors typically failed.

For years, challenges to formal employment for women included gendered presumptions that they should stay at home. In an effort to uphold conventional gender standards, officials carrying out the economic reorganization even proposed that employment losses would "allow many female employees to return home to care for their families." Women's unpaid domestic work expanded and their economic involvement became less stable when state support systems such as childcare, healthcare, and subsidized food were eliminated.

Due to declining cash accessible, competition from imports, and the loss of economic protections from the Sandinista era, women in urban cooperatives and small industries found it difficult to maintain their businesses during the 1990s. The collapse of these organizations serve as an example of the larger trend that under neoliberalism, women's economic spaces diminished while gender differences in work expectations, income, and resource access grew.

== Climate vulnerability ==
Nicaragua was ranked sixth on the Global Climate Risk Index from 1998 to 2017, making it one of the world's most climate-vulnerable nations. Hurricanes, floods, droughts, and landslides, whose frequency and intensity have increased with climate variability, disproportionately affect rural people. Because women are frequently given more responsibility for household survival, managing natural resources, and performing labor related to climate adaptation, researchers observe that these environmental stressors are perceived through highly gendered dynamics.

Due in part to the growth of commercial cattle, environmental degradation and deforestation have increased soil instability, water shortages, and agricultural unpredictability, all of which have contributed to widespread rural poverty. Many communities are moving away from conventional agriculture, since about 25% of rural farming households are considered extremely poor.

In this setting, disparities in sexual and reproductive health and gender-based violence are intertwined with climate change. Significant obstacles, such as washed-out roads, a lack of transportation, and heightened risk during extreme weather events, are reported by young women as preventing them from taking part in development and educational activities. These institutional obstacles exacerbate already-existing patriarchal norms, frequently placing the burden of home care and environmental protection on women, even as the effects of climate change increase their susceptibility.

=== Climate and gender based violence ===
Young women's experiences of violence in rural Nicaragua are also influenced by climate-related stressors. Women describe feeling "like prisoners in our own homes," unable to access educational resources, or safe spaces for reporting abuse, while environmental changes isolate communities and harm infrastructure. These circumstances exacerbate pre-existing gender disparities that stem from Nicaragua's long-standing patriarchal system, which has been strengthened by legal and political changes since the 1970s.

Studies show that environmental uncertainty and gender-based violence are inextricably linked. In addition to managing household safety, protecting the environment, and learning about sexual and reproductive health, women are expected to navigate male-dominated social institutions and increasingly frequent disruptions caused by climate change.

== Education ==
The literacy rate of the female youth (15–24) was 88.8% in 2012 and with that, 3.6% higher than the rate of male youth. From pre-primary school to secondary school, generally more female than male students are enrolled, education is free and accessible to every Nicaraguan. The Gender Parity Index in Nicaragua was 1.035 in 2010, 3.8% higher than the worldwide average. Despite these indicators, challenges remain, including the quality of education, resources, high dropout rates often linked to early pregnancy (exacerbated by lack of comprehensive sex education), and reaching marginalized groups, particularly in indigenous areas.

== Rollback of women's rights under the Ortega-Murillo regime (2007–present) ==
The period since Daniel Ortega's return to the presidency of Nicaragua in 2007, alongside Vice President Rosario Murillo, has been characterized by a significant and systematic rollback of women's rights, according to multiple observers including the Atlantic Council and academic researchers. This regression marks a departure from earlier advancements, particularly those achieved during the Sandinista Revolution of the 1980s. The contemporary situation under the increasingly authoritarian regime involves the suppression of civil society, legislative changes detrimental to women, severe restrictions on reproductive health, impunity for gender-based violence, and targeted repression against women activists and organizations.

=== Overview ===
Since President Daniel Ortega returned to power in 2007, Nicaragua has witnessed a pronounced decline in the legal and societal standing of women. This deterioration is marked by systemic repression targeting women's rights activists, the implementation of regressive legislation such as a total ban on abortion, and the dismantling of civil society organizations advocating for gender equality. The Ortega-Murillo administration has increasingly utilized conservative religious narratives to align state policies with anti-feminist agendas, thereby restricting women's reproductive autonomy and contributing to an environment where gender-based violence persists. This trend is compounded by significant institutional erosion, including the closure of over 2,000 non-governmental organizations (NGOs) since 2018, many of which provided essential support and advocacy for women. Consequently, women activists face heightened risks, including violence and intimidation, fostering a climate of fear that discourages broader participation in movements for gender equality.

=== History (Post–2007 context) ===
==== Neoliberal reforms and activism (1990s–Early 2000s) ====
Following the FSLN's electoral defeat in 1990, the administration of Violeta Chamorro implemented neoliberal economic reforms. These reforms led to the dismantling of social programs, widespread job losses (affecting around 16,000 women by the early 1990s), and privatization of services, disproportionately impacting women and marginalized groups like Afro-descendant communities. By 1994, 72.5% of female-headed households lived below the poverty line. Despite these hardships, women's activism increased, focusing on issues like violence, economic instability, and the erosion of social services. However, this era also saw rising societal violence against women and continued threats against rights defenders. Indigenous and Black women continued to face systemic discrimination.

==== Return of Ortega and authoritarian consolidation (2007–present) ====
Daniel Ortega's return to the presidency in 2007 marked a complex period. While the administration introduced Ley 779 in 2012 to combat gender-based violence, it simultaneously adopted policies that undermined women's autonomy. Most notably, therapeutic abortion was repealed in 2006 just before Ortega took office, and a total ban was subsequently enforced. Political repression intensified, particularly after the 2018 anti-government protests were violently suppressed, solidifying the regime's authoritarian nature and further marginalizing women's rights advocates.

=== Legal situation ===
==== Legislative framework: progress and regression ====
Nicaragua's legal framework concerning women's rights presents contradictions. According to the Alliance for Global Justice, the Equal Rights and Opportunities Law (2007) aimed to enhance women's political and economic rights. The Comprehensive Law Against Violence Towards Women (Ley Integral Contra La Violencia Hacia Las Mujeres, Ley 779), passed in 2012, was a significant step, recognizing gender-based violence as a violation of women's human rights and shifting focus from "domestic violence" to systemic gender discrimination.

However, these advancements have been counteracted by regressive actions. In October 2006, shortly before Ortega's return, Congress repealed Article 165 of the Penal Code, a key provision protecting women's rights, despite widespread opposition. The total ban on abortion, removing previous therapeutic exceptions, was enacted in 2006 and later ratified in the Penal Code. According to AFGJ, petitions challenging the constitutionality of the abortion ban filed in 2007 remain unadjudicated by the Supreme Court. More recently, laws enacted in 2020, such as the cybercrime law ("Gag Law" or Law 1042) criminalizing "false" information and the "Foreign Agents" law restricting foreign funding for NGOs, have further curtailed freedom of expression and the operational capacity of civil society, directly impacting women's advocacy groups.

==== Enforcement, impunity, and access to justice ====
Despite the existence of laws like Ley 779, enforcement is weak, and a climate of impunity persists, particularly regarding gender-based violence. The judiciary lacks independence and is widely seen as controlled by the executive branch, creating significant barriers for women seeking justice. Laws protecting women are often undermined by a state narrative prioritizing traditional family values over individual women's rights. Women human rights defenders face significant risks, hindering their ability to push for legal reforms and accountability. Access to justice remains a challenge, especially for rural women.

=== Health care ===
==== Reproductive health crisis ====
Access to sexual and reproductive health (SRH) services has severely deteriorated. The cornerstone of this rollback is the total ban on abortion enacted in 2006, which eliminated previous exceptions for the health of the pregnant woman. This ban has led to increased maternal mortality and morbidity resulting from unsafe, clandestine abortions. Women, including victims of rape, are forced to carry pregnancies to term, regardless of health risks. Access to contraception and family planning services is also hindered by socio-economic factors, cultural norms, and limited availability, particularly in rural areas. Unintended pregnancies are common and associated with negative health outcomes for women and children, exacerbated by factors like partner control and violence against women (VAW).

==== Maternal mortality and health challenges ====
Nicaragua faces high maternal mortality rates, estimated between 93 and 250 deaths per 100,000 live births, among the highest in Latin America. Major causes include post-delivery hemorrhage and complications from unsafe abortions. Limited access to quality healthcare facilities and trained personnel, especially in rural areas, forces many women into unsafe home births. Domestic violence is a significant contributing factor, with 29% of women reporting experiencing violence, and 37% of those reporting violence during pregnancy.

==== Barriers to accessing care ====
Significant barriers prevent women from accessing necessary health services, including maternal care. These include logistical challenges, poverty, lack of transportation, cultural norms limiting women's autonomy, and inadequate healthcare infrastructure, particularly in rural regions. While some initiatives, like mobile clinics, attempt to bridge the gap, systemic issues remain. The government's control over the health sector and lack of transparency, evident during the COVID-19 pandemic, further complicate the situation.

=== Education ===
==== Impact of rights rollback on education ====
The erosion of women's rights has direct consequences for their educational access and achievement. Restrictive laws like the "Gag Law" (Law 1042) can stifle open discussion about gender equality within educational institutions.

==== Sexual and reproductive health education (SRHE) ====
Sexual and reproductive health education is a critical area affected by authoritarian policy. The total abortion ban and the surrounding social stigma create barriers to providing comprehensive information about sexual health and reproductive rights in schools. This lack of education contributes to higher rates of unintended pregnancies and unsafe abortions among young women, often forcing them to drop out of school. International bodies and local stakeholders advocate for comprehensive sexual education (CSE), but face resistance from the government and ideological pressures.

==== General education barriers and initiatives ====
Broader challenges in the education sector disproportionately affect girls and women, including poor quality education, lack of resources, untrained teachers, curricula that are not culturally or linguistically appropriate, high dropout rates often linked to early pregnancy, and lack of community support for girls' secondary education, particularly in remote and indigenous areas. Initiatives like the TILE project use mobile technology to improve educational outcomes in remote indigenous communities. While the General Education Act (2006) mandates inclusive education and the Equal Rights and Opportunities Act (2008) promotes gender equity, implementation gaps remain, particularly concerning teacher training in inclusive practices and reaching marginalized populations.

==== Reproductive health training ====
In Nicaragua, nongovernmental organizations, rather than the government, have been primarily responsible for efforts to incorporate international human rights principles into reproductive health care. Ipas Central America collaborated with nursing and medical schools in 2006 to integrate human rights principles into reproductive health education, highlighting the duty of healthcare professionals to uphold patient rights in clinical settings. Less than half of medical and nursing students felt comfortable recognizing or addressing human rights violations in healthcare, according to baseline assessments. Although structural obstacles like under-staffing, a lack of resources, and ingrained gender norms limited their ability to put this knowledge into practice, pilot studies demonstrated that training programs boosted providers' confidence in standing up for patient rights and taking action when violations occurred. These results imply that Nicaragua's adherence to international human rights treaties has not resulted in systematic state-led training, leaving NGOs to repair educational gaps in the healthcare system.

=== Political and public representation ===
==== Suppression of civil society and women's voices ====
A key feature of the rights rollback is the systematic suppression of independent civil society. Since 2018, the government has cancelled the legal status of over 2,000 NGOs, including many prominent women's rights organizations. This crackdown has drastically reduced the space for advocacy, service provision, and public discourse on gender equality and women's rights.

==== Targeting of activists ====
Women activists, human rights defenders, journalists, and political opponents face severe repression, including arbitrary detention, harassment, threats, violence, stigmatization, and forced exile. Feminist movements face hostility from the government, including the blocking of demonstrations and counter-protests organized by pro-government groups. This creates a pervasive climate of fear designed to silence dissent.

==== Persistent grassroots resistance ====
Despite the severe repression, feminist movements and grassroots organizations continue to resist. They employ diverse strategies, including building solidarity networks, using social media for mobilization and awareness, documenting abuses, and continuing advocacy efforts, often at great personal risk.

=== Societal impact ===
==== Reinforcement of patriarchal norms and violence ====
The government's rhetoric and policies actively reinforce traditional patriarchal norms, often using religious justifications and prioritizing a conservative vision of the family over individual women's rights and autonomy. This contributes to the persistence of gender-based violence and creates an environment where victims are discouraged from seeking help or justice. Deeply rooted cultural norms that discriminate against women, particularly regarding their sexuality, persist and intersect with restrictive state policies.

==== Economic disempowerment ====
The rollback of rights has significant economic consequences for women. Limited educational and employment opportunities, coupled with the burden of unpaid domestic and care work (women spend nearly three times as much time on these tasks as men), restrict women's economic participation and independence. Gender-based violence also negatively impacts educational attainment and employment prospects. Historical economic shocks and neoliberal policies have previously pushed large numbers of women into poverty and informal labor. While some government programs aim to provide economic support to women, as reported by outlets like ScheerPost, systemic economic inequalities and barriers remain significant.

==== Marginalization of Indigenous and Afro-descendant women ====
Indigenous and Afro-descendant women face compounded discrimination based on the intersection of gender, race, and often socio-economic status. Their specific needs and experiences are frequently overlooked in national policies and even within some broader women's rights movements. The erosion of regional autonomy promised during the revolutionary period has further marginalized these communities.

=== International response ===
==== Condemnation and sanctions ====
The Ortega-Murillo regime's actions have drawn widespread international condemnation from the United Nations, the European Union, the Organization of American States (OAS), and individual countries including the United States, Canada, and the United Kingdom. Targeted sanctions have been imposed on government officials and associated entities implicated in human rights abuses and the undermining of democracy. Discussions about broader economic pressure, such as potentially suspending Nicaragua from the Central America-Dominican Republic Free Trade Agreement (CAFTA-DR), have occurred, though implementation faces challenges.

==== Monitoring and reporting ====
International bodies actively monitor and report on the human rights situation. The United Nations Human Rights Council reviews Nicaragua's record through mechanisms like the Universal Periodic Review (UPR) and has established expert groups to investigate abuses. The Office of the United Nations High Commissioner for Human Rights (OHCHR) has documented the persecution of civil society actors and ongoing violations. The Inter-American Commission on Human Rights (IACHR) also continues to report on the deteriorating situation.

==== Diplomatic isolation and support for civil society ====
The OAS declared the November 2021 elections illegitimate, leading Nicaragua to announce its withdrawal from the organization, increasing its diplomatic isolation. Despite the government's hostility and the closure of many NGOs, international organizations and donor agencies continue to attempt to provide support (financial and technical) to the remaining grassroots activists and civil society groups working on women's rights, SRHE, and human rights defense within the country. Calls persist for accountability, dialogue, and respect for human rights.
