= ʻOfa Likiliki =

New Zealand Tongan filmmaker and women's rights activist

ʻOfa Guttenbeil-Likiliki (also called ʻOfa-Ki-Levuka Louise Guttenbeil Likiliki) is a filmmaker and women's rights activist in Tonga and the Pacific. Guttenbeil-Likiliki has urged equality in women's economic and educational empowerment, in their political involvement and representation, in land reform, protection from violence, and has advocated for the ratification of the Convention on the Elimination of All Forms of Discrimination Against Women for over a decade. On 9 March 2015, her advocacy came to fruition when the Tongan government agreed that it was prepared to ratify the convention. Guttenbeil-Likiliki was twice nominated for the U.S. Secretary of State International Women of Courage Award (2012,2013) recognising her work in advocating for women and children's rights in Tonga.

== Early life ==
ʻOfa-Ki-Levuka Louise Guttenbeil was born in New Zealand, to Tongan born parents who migrated to New Zealand during the early 1970s to work in the industrial boom that called for low skilled migrant workers. Guttenbeil-Likiliki has 3 older siblings who were all born in Tonga however raised mostly in New Zealand. She returned to the island in 2000. She obtained a B.A. and an M.A. in Film, TV and Media Communications (Hons) from the University of Auckland. She earned a post graduate diploma in International Broadcast Journalism from the Thomson Foundation in collaboration with the University of Cardiff, Wales. Her Bachelor of Laws was completed at the University of the South Pacific and Likiliki is currently pursuing a Master of Laws with an emphasis on legal reform in relation to Temporary Special Measures or increasing women's representation in parliament.

She has worked as a DJ for Kool 90FM – Radio Tonga 2, also as Senior Presenter, Senior Producer and Marketing manager for Radio & TV Tonga, and was the host of Juice Music produced by Television Tonga. She also was a co-host with Arnold Manu of Tonga's indigenous music video program, Talamahe'a.

== Activism ==
Beginning around 2005, Guttenbeil-Likiliki founded and worked as coordinator of the Women's Action Group for Change, urging the government to allow women to participate in government consultations regarding education, poverty reduction and economic development. In 2008, she was advocating for alternative energy solutions as a method of reducing cost to women and children for basic utilities.

In 2009 Guttenbeil-Likiliki and 16 of the 17 staff members employed at the Tonga National Centre for Women and Children (TNCWC) walked off of their jobs and created the Women and Children Crisis Centre. The move was predicated by a desire to retain the autonomy of an NGO without governmental oversight. The founding group of men and women, with Guttenbeil-Likiliki as the director, created an organization to educate and advocate for the elimination of domestic violence and provide support for victims. The organization operates a 24-hour temporary safe house, assists victims with counseling, support, and advocacy.

She has spoken out about the levels of violence in the region, noting a 2009 report indicated 79% of Tongan women had been the victims of physical or sexual violence and 2012 Ma'a Fafine Mo e Famili (MFF) study showed 75% of Tongan women have experienced violence from males. After two years of pressing for legal protections in 2013, the Tongan parliament passed a Family Protection Bill which required victims to be informed of their rights and legal procedures, allowed police to issue immediate emergency protection orders, and established a monitoring committee.

In 2012, Guttenbeil-Likiliki strongly supported land reform proposals for the progress of equality in Tongan society. Recalling that in its history, Tonga has had only 4 women elected to govern since the 1950s political representation and participation in governance are critical areas where change is needed to Guttenbeil-Likiliki. In 2014, Tonga appointed the first ever justices of the peace. Guttenbeil-Likiliki was one of the initial 19 people selected as justice of the peace and she represents her home district of Tongatapu.

She has been an advocate for the ratification of CEDAW for the past 11 years and on 9 March 2015, that dream became a reality when the Tongan government agreed to ratify the Convention. Though the signing was to be with reservations, Guttenbeil-Likiliki saw the move as a positive one which will signify that the government is amenable to making changes. After over a month of delays in the ratification, Guttenbeil-Likiliki, expressed that the ratification was being used for political ends, with claims being made that ratification would lead to gay marriage and legalized abortion, neither of which are part of the Convention.

For their work in promoting women's rights in Tonga the Women and Children Crisis Centre was awarded the South Pacific Commission (SPC) Human Rights Award in 2010.

== Personal information ==
'Ofa Guttenbeil married Nasili Likiliki in 2002 and has four children.

She and her husband are the owners and operators of Coconut Productions, which has produced videos for the Women and Development Centre to explain official government policy in a family-friendly format. In 2014 her film Dear Tita won the Best Project from the Masterclass Pan-Pacific Media Project.
