= Women's rights in Tonga =

Women's rights in Tonga, as compared to the United Nations goals of CEDAW, fail to comply entirely with the conventions requirements. Although considerations have been made by the Tongan parliament and government, ratification of CEDAW still remains unresolved. Factors determining the non-ratification of CEDAW are related to cultural protectionism of the Anga Fakatonga or "the Tongan way" of Tongan culture. Issues of Women's rights in Tonga include factors of women's land right, violence against women, political participation in parliament, and general cultural attitude towards the gender inequalities within Tonga. Many of the issues of gender inequalities within the Tongan culture are reinforced in the home and complex structures of the cultural family hierarchy.

The issue of women's rights in Tonga is not entirely ignored within Tongan culture and government, and reformations have been considered. Women within Tonga have had the right to vote since the late Majesty Queen Sālote Tupou III amended the constitution allowing this right in 1951. Other reformations and amendments to the Tongan Constitution have been considered. Violence against women in Tonga has been spotlighted and measures have been taken to better enforce laws protecting women against domestic violence, and spousal abuse.

== Gender inequalities in Tonga ==
According to the 2011 Human Development Report (HDR), Tonga ranked 90th out of 187 countries in terms of the Human Development Index (HDI). In terms of gender inequalities, a key indicator that stands out in the HDR is that in 2011, Tongan women constituted 3.4% of the elected representatives, which stands in stark contrast to the regional averages for East Asia and Pacific (20.2%) and small island developing countries (20.6%). Moreover, no woman was elected in the 2010 elections, albeit one who was appointed to a cabinet post. This poor political representation does not seem to stem from the low educational achievement of women, since, according to the 2011 HDR, 84% of women and 87.8% of men in Tonga had at least secondary education, which is well above the regional averages for East Asia and the Pacific and small island developing countries. There was disparity in women's labor force participation relative to men's participation rate: half the Tongan women were in the labor force compared to 75% of Tongan men.

The population of males and females in the total Tongan population is nearly equal with the total male population at 52,350 male and 52,360 female. By this total population ration data, there is no visible data showing that there is a gender bias for sex selective births.

== Tonga and CEDAW ==
Along with Palau, Tonga is one of two countries in the Pacific region and one of six countries (other sovereign states: United States, Sudan, Somalia, and Iran) in the world which have yet to ratify the Convention on the Elimination of All Forms of Discrimination Against Women (CEDAW). CEDAW is considered by many to be an international bill of rights for women, and has aimed to create universal ideals for women's rights and gender equality. In September 2009, the Legislative Assembly voted 18 to 1 with 4 abstentions not to ratify CEDAW. In announcing the decision not to ratify, the Tongan Prime Minister stated that ratification would cut across our cultural and social heritage that makes up the Tongan way of life. Furthermore, Tonga did not want to ratify with reservations or undertake a 'ratification of convenience.' ‘Ofa Likiliki has been an advocate for the ratification of CEDAW for the past 11 years. On 9 March 2015, in a historical decision the Tongan government agreed to ratify the Convention with reservations. Though the signing was to be with reservations, Likiliki saw the move as a positive one which will signify that the government is amenable to making changes.

=== Tongan culture and CEDAW ===
Tonga's rich and ancient culture dates back an estimated 3000 years when the Tongan archipelago was inhabited. Tongan culture and society have evolved over many thousands of years creating the back bone of Tongan culture. Today Tongan culture and the Anga Fakatonga (Tongan way of life) is protected and preserved by lawmakers, government, and monarchy within Tonga. Great respect for the Anga Fakatonga is also given by Tongan society in protection of culture and heritage. The Anga Fakatonga has preserved a rich and ancient culture that has codified law and social norms within today's current Tongan society. The Anga Fakatonga has been culturally protected and is rarely open to outside influence and intervention. In regards to women's rights and ratification of CEDAW (The Committee on the Elimination of Discrimination Against Women) the Anga Fakatonga has clashed with some of CEDAW reformation measures and has been a factor in the current non-ratification of CEDAW. Issues with Tonga's current laws and the Anga Fakatonga's adherence include women's land rights and loose enforcement of violence against women laws.

== Tongan social structure ==
=== Kin-based stratification ===
Traditional Tongan culture has ancient traditions including a "kin-based stratification", or allocation of power based on age, sexual orientation, and birth order. The Api, or basic order of Tongan society, is based at the root of oldest male control over a family group. This control, or leadership, is a responsibility with the family group, but it also gives power over decision making of things such as resource allocation, family labor duties, and discipline.

=== Family decision making ===
Decision making traditionally has been made by the father/husband. Imbedded deeply in the Tongan cultural framework, this patriarchal, or 'Ulumotu'a (oldest male) leadership places decisions final say with the male leader of any given Tongan family. The fahu, the highest female in social structure, or oldest sister in the family structure, has title given but traditionally does not have any decision making power. It could be argued that an increase in educated male and female population couples has balanced the decision making shared between both husband and wife. However, in extended family structure, the traditional kin based stratification is usually followed.

=== Article 12 ===
The Tongan Government has made recent efforts and commitments in reform and acceptance of some of the rights promoted by CEDAW. CEDAW endorsed convention, the Convention on the Rights of the Child-Ensuring the Girl Child's Participation which (article 12), is to encourage adults to listen to the opinions of children and involve them in decision making. "This does not give authority over adults and does not interfere with parents' rights and responsibilities in relations to matters affecting their children. The Convention recognizes that a child's participation in decision making must occur in a manner that is appropriate to the child's age and maturity."

== Women's land rights ==
Historically the Kingdom of Tonga has been centered on cultivation and farming. Early explorers recorded accounts speak of beautiful gardens planted symmetrically and carefully cared for. Today much of Tonga, especially in remote rural areas and scattered on the many islands of Tonga, still rely on cultivation for livelihood. This cultivation technique historically and presently has revolved around the importance of women and their responsibility for much of the labor burden associated with it. Tongan women's physical participation includes growing and marketing the agriculture produce. Although women have been pivotal in the cultivation and use of land, women still today, under the constitution of The Kingdom of Tonga cannot own land. If a woman in Tonga wishes to use land for any purpose, including for cultivation, they cannot buy land but must only lease land for its temporary use.

=== Land ownership reformations ===
The Ministry of Women's Affairs in Tonga will be enacted and created by the end of 2012 and has been announced (March 2012). This will open up options, and possible conversation about women's rights, to review and possibly amend the current constitution in regards to the current women's land rights in Tonga. As a possible move towards an amendment of current constitutional restrictions of women and ownership of land, Tonga could take a huge step forward towards the ratification of the UN Convention of the Elimination of Discrimination Against Women (CEDAW). Independent of compliance and possible ratification of CEDAW, through an amendment of the current constitutional laws, it is thought that women's possible land ownership will help progress women's rights on a large scale.

== Violence against women ==
In many cases, violence against women has gone unnoticed, and is accepted by both men and women, and is rarely prosecuted. Marital rape was criminalized in 2013.

=== Reform in protecting women ===
The Solicitor General, 'Aminiasi Kefu pledged in early March 2012 initiatives set to protect women. These initiatives include a formal Bill on Domestic Violence, and a bill addressing Tongan women's land rights drafted in part by the Ministry of Women's Affairs. A pledge was also made that adoption of a "no drop policy" be enacted for all cases of domestic violence pending an investigation, and prosecution if conclusive evidence is found of bodily harm, indecent assault, incest or rape.

The Australian High Commissioner to Tonga, HE Mr. Thomas Roth pledged a $1 million UN Women Pacific Fund to End Violence Against Women in March 2012. HE Mr. Thomas Roth said in an announcement of the funds, "UN Women Pacific Fund to End Violence Against Women" would be used to establish grants and facilitate training services for Tongan organizations to promote their work to eliminate violence against women". In 2013 the Tongan legislature passed a Family Protection Bill which gave police the ability to issue immediate protection orders, establishes procedures to informing victims of their rights and procedures, and created a committee to monitor implementation of the bill.

== Women's political participation in Tonga ==
Other issues of Tongan women's rights include women's low participation in government parliament. The parliament is the governing body that has historically and even in recent years rejected CEDAW, in an effort to protect the Anga Fakatonga. There are some male political participants including the former Prime Minister Lord Tu'ivakano, who have said that they support the CEDAW. However, there is an overwhelming attitude in Parliament and in the general political environment that there are more pressing issues including political reform and economic development that have placed women's rights on the back burner. Women however do have a voting voice as of 1951 when the late Majesty Queen Salote Tupou III amended the constitution allowing this right. Women, by this amendment, were also allowed participation in parliament, however from the time that women were given the opportunity, only four have been voted in as a voice for the people on Parliament as People's Representatives in the Legislative Assembly.

=== Political progression ===
Until 2006, women have not been appointed to a Ministerial Position. In May 2006, Solicitor General 'Alisi Taumoepeau was appointed Minister of Justice. Under the 1875 Tongan Constitution, women cannot be voted into one of the nine Noble seats or two Governors' seats as these aristocratic positions can currently only be inherited by men. Aside from the nine seats in Parliament and the two Governors' seats, there are twelve seats reserved for the Minister of the Crown which are all reserved and appointed by the King. Until the recent appointment of Alisi Taumoepeau in 2006 there had not been any Women appointed to Ministerial Positions.

=== Cultural attitudes and social norms ===
Of the 33 seats in the house reserved for Peoples Representatives, only 9 represent any hope of women getting in Parliament as the other 23 seats are assigned and/or can only be held by men. Women still struggle to gain any access to these 9 available seats due to social norms and cultural attitudes. These social norms and cultural attitudes do not come only from the male population, but an attitude of women in Tongan society, which consequently has slowed this current progression of women's participation as a People's Representative in Tongan Parliament. This is apparent in the overwhelming vote-in of male candidates over female candidates even though women have had voting rights since 1951. The women still tend to vote for a male dominate government within Tonga.

=== CEDAW and political goals ===
Article 7 of CEDAW states that “State Parties shall take all appropriate measures to eliminate discrimination against women in the political and public life of the country and, in particular, shall ensure women, on equal terms with men, the right: (b) "To participate in the formulation of the government policy and the implementation thereof and to hold public office and perform all public functions at all levels of government". Tonga has made specific goals in the development of women's rights that should comply more with the measures of CEDAW. Commitments and goals to improve political participation include; Gender and Development policy (GAD) which was passed and approved by the Tongan Government in 2003, and the Government's Strategic Development Plans (SDP) where clear gender developments are made in strategic development.

== See also ==
- Human rights in Tonga
- Women in Tonga
