= Women in Tonga =

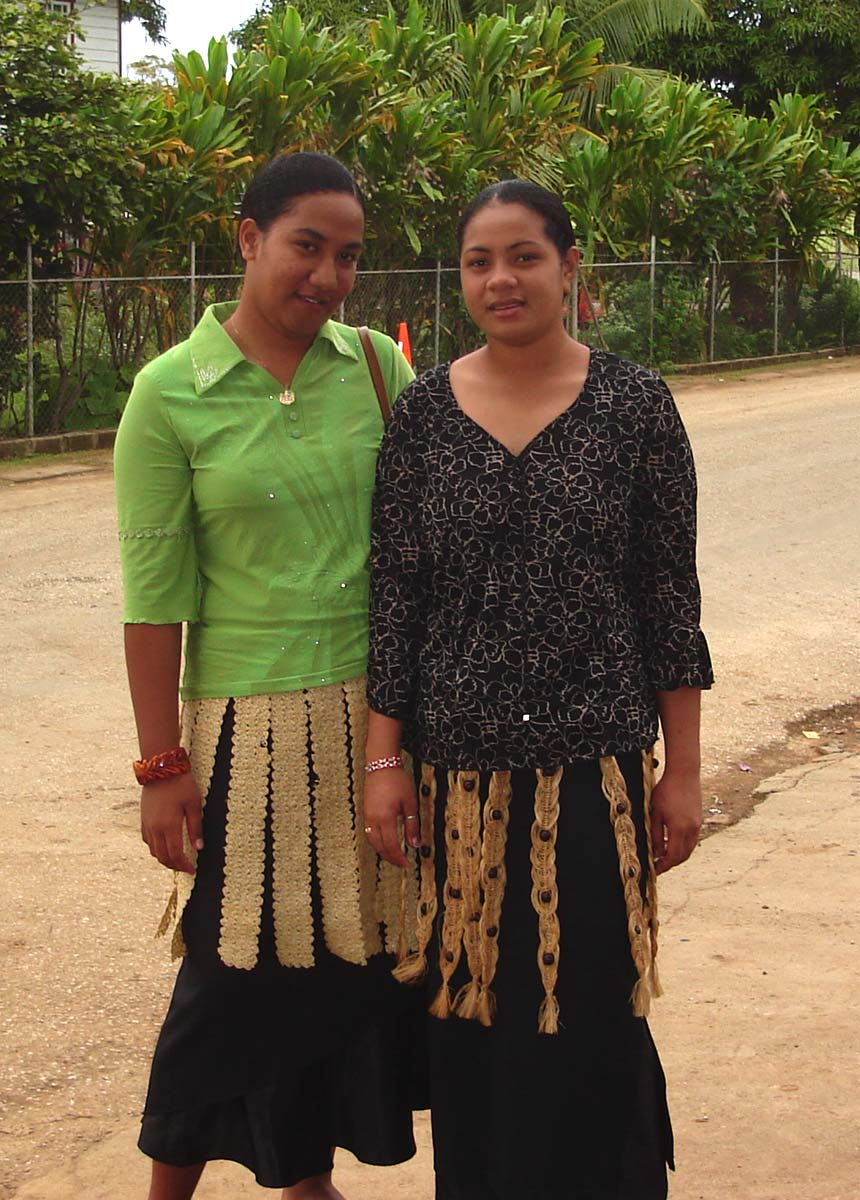
- Two modern-day young Tongan women, both dressed with the clothing accessory known as the kiekie or "ornamental girdle".

General statistics
- Maternal mortality (per 100,000): 110 (2010)
- Women in parliament: 3.6% (2013)
- Women over 25 with secondary education: 87.5% (2012)
- Women in labour force: 53.5% (2012)

Gender Inequality Index
- Value: 0.631 (2021)
- Rank: 160th out of 191

As female residents of Tonga, women in Tonga had been described in 2000 by the Los Angeles Times as members of Tongan society who traditionally have a "high position in Tongan society" due to the country's partly matriarchal foundation but "can't own land", "subservient" to husbands in terms of "domestic affairs" and "by custom and law, must dress modestly, usually in Mother Hubbard-style dresses hemmed well below the knee". Based on the "superficial dealings" of LA Times Travel Writer, Susan Spano with the women of Tonga in 2000, she found that Tongan women were a "little standoffish", while Patricia Ledyard, former headmistress of a missionary school for girls in Tonga, confirmed that such "aloofness" of Tongan women were due to the nation's "rigid class system" and the country's "efforts to retain its cultural identity". There were presence of Tongan women who are professionals engaged in jobs as travel agents, as vendors selling an "exotic cornucopia of root vegetables and tropical fruit(s)", and as basket weavers.

== Traditional position in society ==
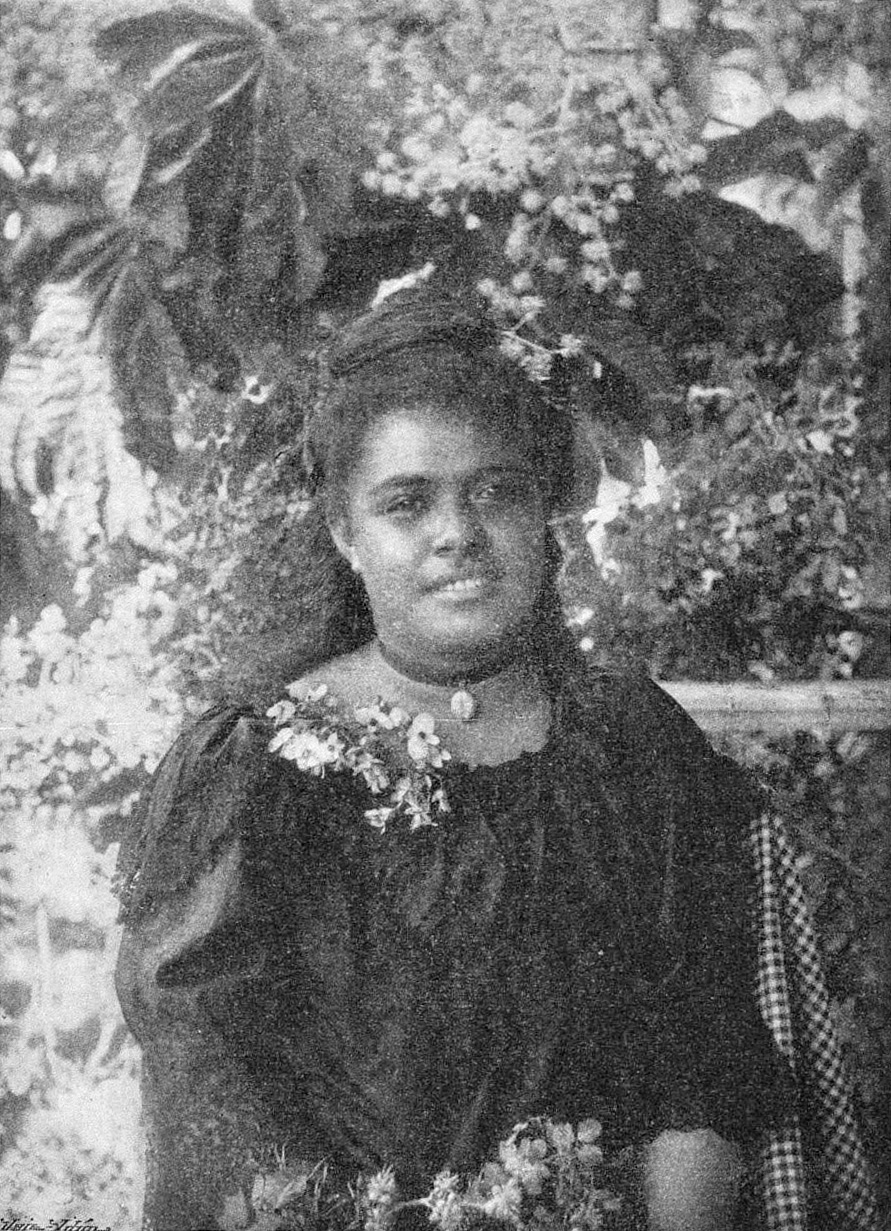
A young girl in Tonga, 1901.

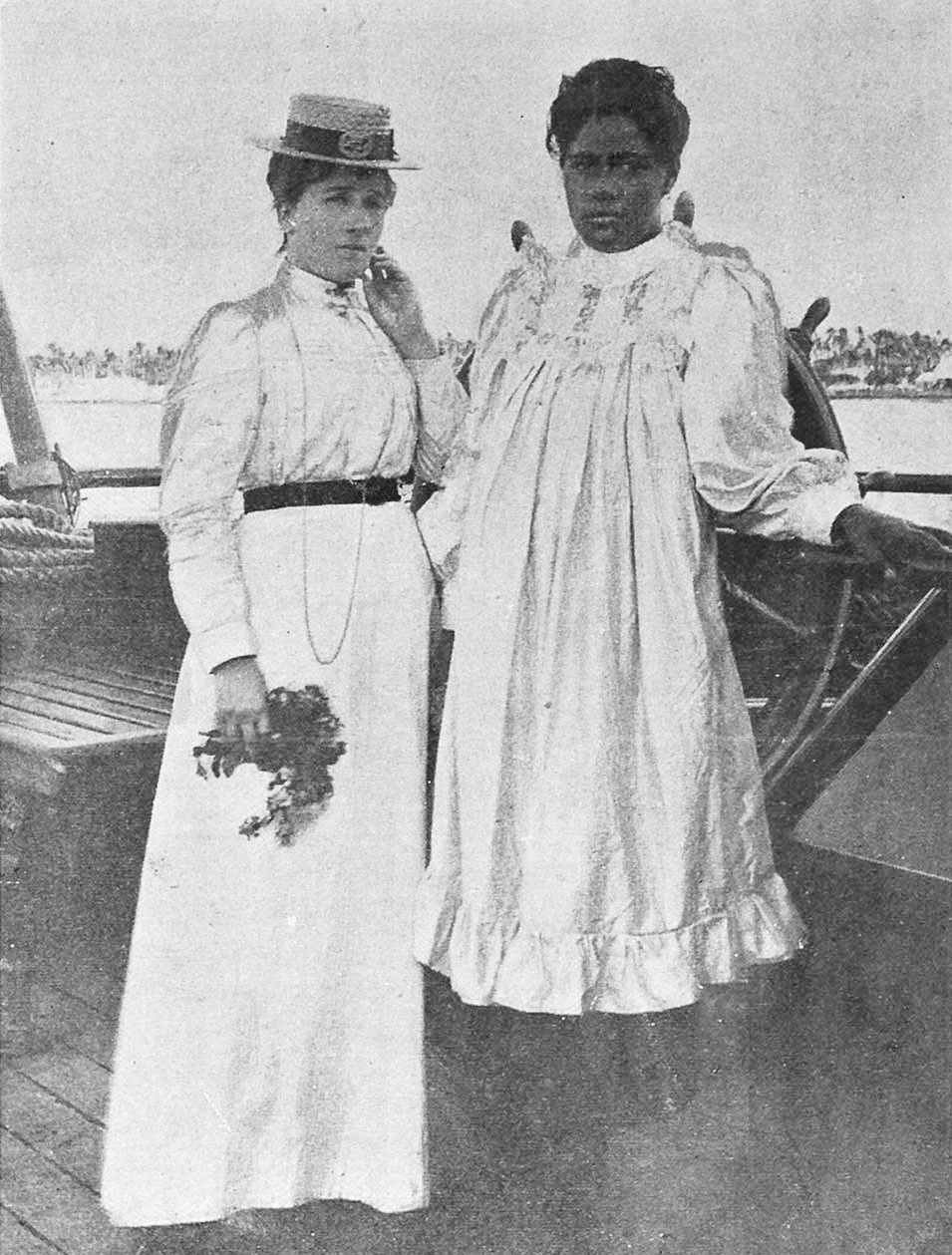
A picture of Ofa-ki-Vavaʻu, the daughter of Māʻatu from Niuatoputapu, who was related to the Tuʻi Haʻatakalaua line. She was the potential bride of King George Tupou II. She is pictured here with Mrs. Dyer, an Australian music publisher and patron of the arts, during the visit of New Zealand Premier Richard Seddon to Tonga. Taken from the supplement to the Auckland Weekly News 31 August 1900, page 5, 31 August 1900.

The LA Times further described that Tongan women have a mehekitanga (meaning "auntie") or "fahu" (the eldest aunt), a senior women who shared with a brother the authority and power over a family group. The mehekitanga has a special position during "weddings, funerals and birthday parties". The mehekitanga is usually seated in front during these special occasions. Prior to getting married, permission was to be asked from the mehekitanga.

== Royal line ==
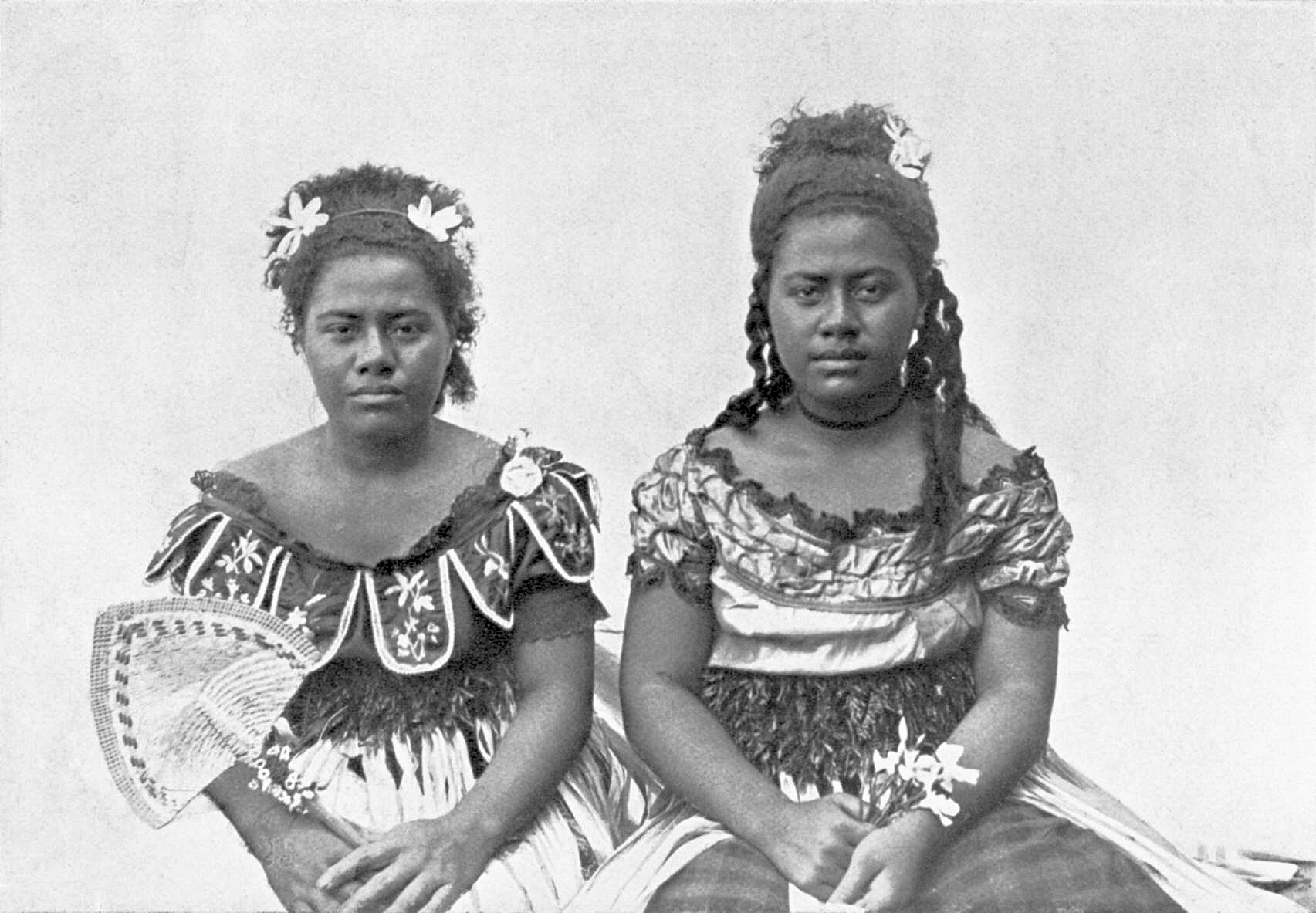
Two young Tongan women in 1925.

The LA Times mentioned that the royal Tongan line "descends through women".

== Education ==
During her reign from 1918 to 1965, Queen Salote supported providing education to women. Present-day Tongan women can go to foreign countries to complete their college education.

== Roles in society ==
Traditional Tongan women perform activities such as cooking, sewing, weaving and jobs that are entrepreneurial in nature.

== Traditional dress ==
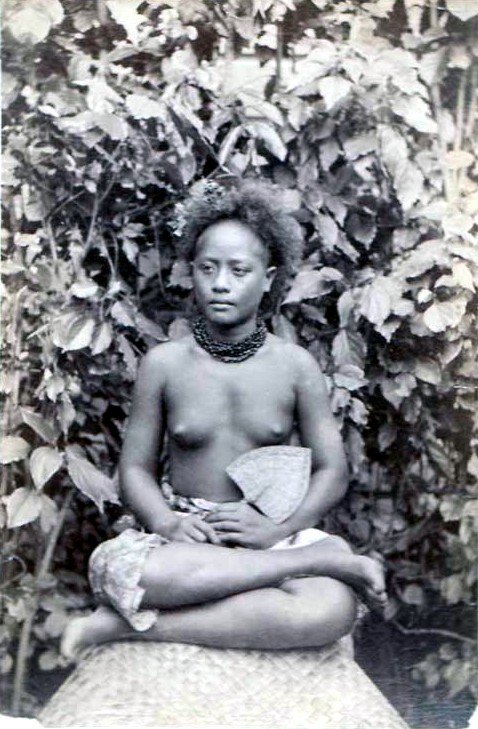
A young woman in Tonga, c. 1885.

In the 1800s, before the arrival of Methodist missionaries, Tongan women dress in a topless manner.

== Lifestyle and work ==
During 1806 to 1810, English author and sailor William Mariner described Tongan women in his book entitled "Tonga Islands" as liberal, who upon marriage lived as faithful wives; as single women, Tongan females may take lovers; Tongan women can divorce their husbands and may remarry "without the least disparagement to [their] character."

Upon the arrival of Christianity and the eventual conversion of most Tongan women, the female members of Tongan society became described as "deeply religious" and "respectable girls" and never walked alone with Tongan boys. The practice of cannibalism also disappeared. In terms of the Miss Tonga beauty pageant, the annual contest does not involve a portion of the program that displays the wearing of swimsuits.

In general, modern-day Tongan women work outside the home. They are not obliged to perform manual labor.

In 1992, Silva McLeod became the first Tongan woman to be a licensed pilot.

== See also ==
- Women's rights in Tonga
- Culture of Tonga
- Demographics of Tonga
- Gender inequality in Tonga
