= Health in Nicaragua =

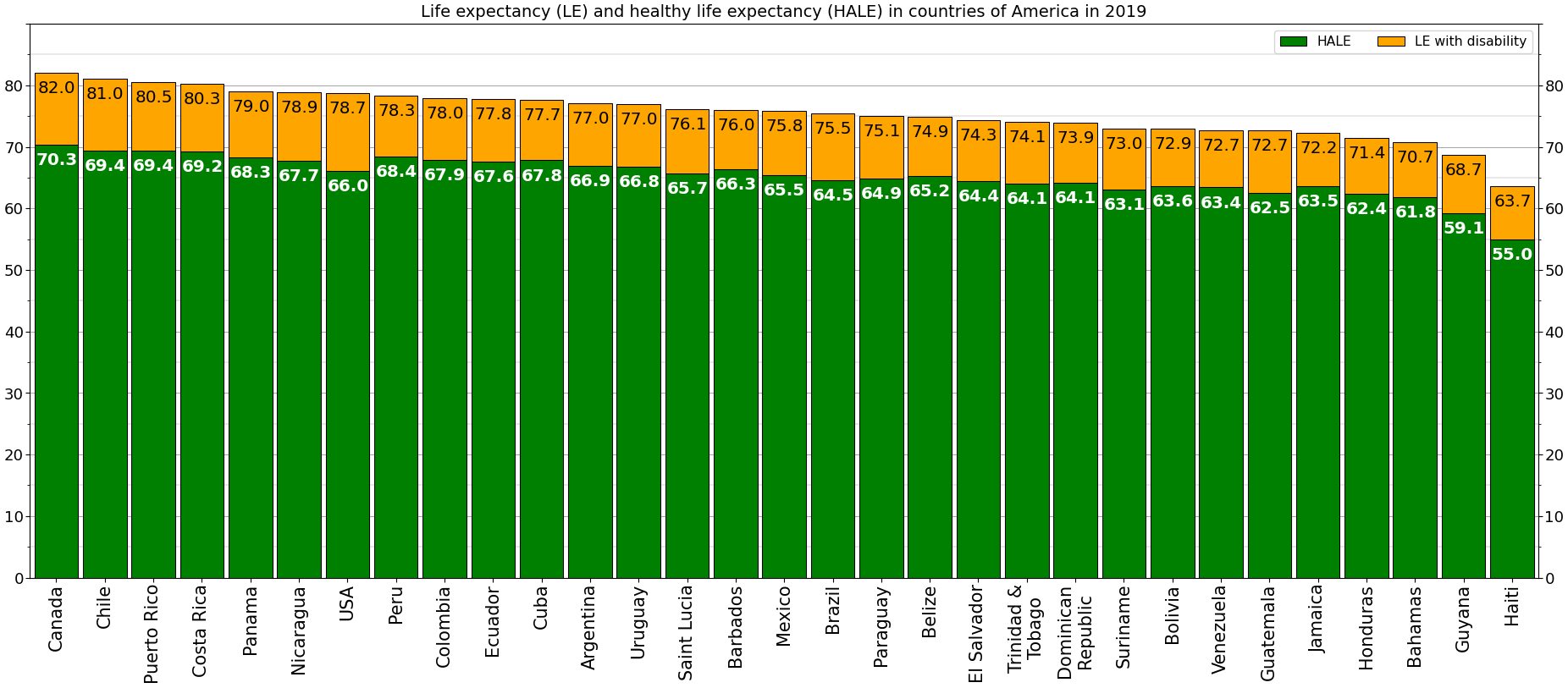
Life expectancy and healthy life expectancy (HALE) in some countries of the Americas, 2019.

Health in Nicaragua is influenced by several factors including public health policies, the availability of healthcare facilities, environmental influences, individual lifestyle choices, and socioeconomic circumstances.

Nicaragua ranks as the second-least affluent nation in the Western Hemisphere. Despite the challenges Nicaragua faces in improving public health, there has been a notable increase in life expectancy since the Sandanista Revolution of 1979, when it stood as low as 55 years old. In comparison, life expectancy in Nicaragua at birth was 72 years for men and 78 for women in 2016. While communicable diseases such as dengue, chikungunya, and Zika continue to persist as national health concerns, there is a rising public health threat of non-communicable diseases such as diabetes, cardiovascular disease, and cancer, which were diseases previously thought to be more relevant and problematic for more developed nations. Additionally, in the women's health sector, high rates of adolescent pregnancy and cervical cancer continue to persist as national concerns. The infrastructure surrounding healthcare in Nicaragua faces challenges that may contribute to the exacerbation of health issues and hinder sustainable improvements. In the process of Nicaragua's democratization, there has been a general decrease in funding allocated to public services, coinciding with an increasing prevalence of privatization in healthcare, including both primary and secondary care. Hence, access to healthcare (and states of health) varies considerably between urban and rural areas, as well as among different socioeconomic groups.

The Human Rights Measurement Initiative finds that Nicaragua is fulfilling 96.1% of what it should be fulfilling for the right to health based on its level of income. When looking at the right to health with respect to children, Nicaragua achieves 98.6% of what is expected based on its current income. In regards to the right to health amongst the adult population, the country achieves only 89.7% of what is expected based on the nation's level of income. Nicaragua falls into the "good" category when evaluating the right to reproductive health because the nation is fulfilling 100.0% of what the nation is expected to achieve based on the resources (income) it has available.

== Communicable diseases ==
=== Tuberculosis ===
In Nicaragua, 48% of tuberculosis (TB) patients have encountered issues with employment and 27% had reported social problems because of stigma associated with the disease. In order to reduce false community beliefs and fears about tuberculosis that could be feeding into this social stigma, various solutions have been proposed and attempted in communities throughout the country.

In order to increase local awareness of this disease and improve TB control, volunteer-run TB clubs have been created in municipalities across Nicaragua to facilitate the creation of supportive community networks and lead educational workshops for citizens. These TB clubs have been reported to be a cost-effective strategy for controlling the spread of TB in Nicaragua; however, some have argued that they lack sustainability in funding. Outside of the educational realm, a team of researchers found that they could reduce internalized social stigma of TB patients in rural Nicaragua by pursuing patient-centered care that allowed for medical professionals to see patients at their homes and gain a better understanding of the support given to them by their social networks.

=== HIV/AIDS ===
Though the prevalence of HIV/AIDS amongst Nicaraguan adults was estimated to be 0.3% by UNAIDS in 2015, in the past UNAIDS' numbers have been claimed to be grossly underreported due to data collection issues. Nicaragua's high prevalence of sexually transmitted infections (STIs), high risk sexual behaviors associated with the culture of machismo, low prevalence of condom usage, and the early age of first sexual intercourse of its citizens all contribute to concerns about rising HIV/AIDS rates.

In Latin America, stigma and discrimination against HIV/AIDS serve as barriers to effective responses and are linked to social inequalities associated with gender, living status, and sexuality. One study found that while 90% of Nicaraguan adolescents would accept and care for a family member with HIV/AIDS, only 69% would tell anyone else if they got diagnosed as HIV-infected and only 46% would share food with someone who was infected. Nine years following the detection of the first HIV case in Nicaragua, the Nicaraguan government instituted Law 238 to protect the rights of those infected with HIV/AIDS in regards to confidentiality, access to healthcare, and nondiscrimination, setting the precedent for future intervention strategies focused on decreasing AIDs stigma amongst various professionals, including health care workers.

=== Mosquito-transmitted diseases ===
The chikungunya, dengue, and Zika viruses co-circulate in Nicaragua, and those infected with one or multiple of these viruses can present with similar clinical symptoms, making clinical treatment and diagnosis more difficult. Co-infections are common in endemic areas in Nicaragua.

Malaria has also been a historically major health issue in Nicaragua, and during the 1930s up to 60% of the population had malaria. Usage of bed-nets protecting against mosquitos have been reported to be 25.3% amongst all Nicaraguan households. Within these households, it was found that children were more often protected than adults with 46% of bed-net coverage of infants under 1 year.

== Chronic diseases ==
There has been an observed increasing prevalence of chronic diseases such as type 2 diabetes, obesity, and hypertension. This increase in prevalence of chronic diseases has been attributed to lifestyle changes and increased urbanization. Improved access to processed foods has led to higher consumption of highly processed snacks and sugar-containing drinks in rural areas of Nicaragua, and raw sugar cane is often freely available. Complementary feeding practices involving breastfeeding paired up with supplementation of artificial snacks were frequently observed amongst 6-to 8-month-olds. These early introduction to highly processed foods leads to increased risk of infections and impaired developmental growth. In 2008, WHO reported that 55.5% of the population was overweight and 22.2% classified as obese, and trends reveal that obesity rates are steadily rising.

Hypertension and pre-hypertension are significant national medical concerns. Studies conducted in rural communities of Nicaragua that have revealed that 41.1% of their residents have hypertension. Beyond these patients who have met this traditional hypertensive minimum cut-off, there is also a large population of pre-hypertensive patients. Health promotional efforts that focus on preventative measures have been proposed to address this pre-hypertensive sub-population.

== Infant health ==
A study conducted in 2000 revealed that poverty of Nicaraguan families heightened the risk of infant mortality. Its findings also showed that social inequity, or the contrast in wealth between a household and its surrounding neighborhood, further increased this risk. In addition to income levels, it has been shown that violence against mothers increases the risk of infant and child mortality. Intimate partner abuse also contributes to low birth weight of infants. Overall decreasing national infant mortality trends correspond with higher educational levels of mothers and lower fertility rates.

== Violence against women ==
Out of Nicaraguan women married or previously married women of childbearing age, 52% have identified having had experienced physical violence by an intimate partner at least once. Additionally, 21% of these women report having experienced a full combination of physical, emotional, and sexual violence at one or more points in their lives.

Domestic violence has immediate and lasting effects on its victims. An overwhelming majority of emotional distress cases amongst every-married Nicaraguan women is attributable to current or former experiences of domestic abuse. Domestic abuse is also correlated with higher incidence of unintended pregnancies in Nicaragua.

== See also ==
- Healthcare in Nicaragua
- Deafness in Nicaragua
