= History of women's rights in South Africa =

Under apartheid in South Africa, apartheid laws and social norms assigned black women a lower status, leading to what is now known as the “triple oppression” of race, class, and gender.

Before the colonial era, women held significant authority in many Indigenous African societies, including in agriculture. However, with the decline of farming, women lost their status and influence, leaving them with limited roles in society.

Gender discrimination in South Africa was based on traditional communal practices, where women were denied rights such as land ownership, custody of their children, and leadership positions. These practices reinforced apartheid ideology and colonial legacies that marginalized women as second-class citizens.

Following on from this history, and the history of South Africa's levels of inequality, unemployment and violence in general; it is noteworthy that rape and physical abuse against women is disproportionately common. South African society is unfavorable to women through both historically conservative society, acceptance of abuse that was tolerated by law, and the threat of violence.

== History ==
=== Discrimination ===
Non-discrimination was a key aspect of South Africa's first democratically elected government in 1994, which officially adopted a “gender equality” stance on decreasing discrimination. South Africa has signed the Convention on the Elimination of All Forms of Discrimination Against Women (CEDAW) as agreed to in the Beijing Platform of Action during the World Conference on Women in Beijing in 1995 to take steps to eliminate gender discrimination. Section 9(3) of the constitution states “The state may not discriminate against anyone using any of the following: race, gender, sex, pregnancy, marital status, ethnic group, social class, skin color, sexual orientation, age, disability, religious belief, culture, tribe, etc.”. The inclusion of both sex and gender as grounds for prohibiting discrimination is particularly significant as it protects individuals from discrimination based on biology or physical traits as well as the social or cultural background of the perceived role and position of women in society.

“Freedom cannot be achieved unless women have been emancipated from all forms of oppression... Our endeavors must be about the liberation of the woman, the emancipation of the man, and the liberty of the child.” 8 December 2013 – Nelson Mandela

Gender discrimination was prevalent within written law, as the access women had to properties was dependent on their relationships with men. Due to restrictive laws in the 1930s, black women were forced to use identity cards, regarded as passbooks, to move around the country, which limited their movement into cities and towns. Lots of women were unable to find jobs in urban areas, limiting them to brewing beer, being nannies, and doing casual work on farms owned by whites. It has been widely argued that traditional rulers suppress the acceptance of gender equality in society for the patriarchal power structures, and this has predominantly affected black women, as the power structure prohibited them from owning property, thereby reducing their role to that of mere mothers and housewives.

Employment discrimination is still prevalent in South Africa, as many women find themselves either excluded from the job market or restricted to the lowest-paying jobs. 57% of all employed South African women work as domestic servants or agricultural laborers. These positions often have little or no power when negotiating working conditions and wages. Apartheid denied African women the right to travel freely to seek gainful employment, which indirectly locked them in poverty without an escape route. Employers often take advantage of women by paying them lesser wages than their male counterparts, thereby violating the legal act put in place to protect worker rights.

==== Key laws and acts relating to gender discrimination ====
In the post-apartheid era of South Africa, multiple laws and acts were put in place to reduce gender discrimination. These include

1. The Commission on Gender Equality monitors issues of gender in civil society. The functions are set out clearly in Section 190, which provides that “the evolving constitutional jurisprudence emanating from the Constitutional Court suggests a clear break from South Africa's ignominious legal past to one forged on principles of equality and non-discrimination”.

2. The Office on the Status of Women is responsible for mainstreaming gender in government departments.

3. The Women's Budget Initiative (WBI) examines the implications of the national budget on women.

4. The Labor Act of 1995 includes a Code of Good Conduct that compels workplaces to have formal sexual harassment policies in place.

5. The Basic Conditions of Employment Act ensures that there is a minimum requirement for maternity leave, which includes antenatal, postnatal, and family responsibility leave.

6. The Employment Equity Act (EEA) ensures women's equal access to the workplace.

7. The Skills Development Act ensures that women receive education and training to gain the necessary skills.

8. The Basic Child Support Grant: This gives financial support to children up to the age of 14.

9. The Maintenance Act of 1998: This law compels both partners to financially support their children. It also allows employers to deduct money from a parent's salary or wages to contribute financially to support the child/children.

10. The Domestic Violence Act (DVA) of 1998 – defends women's rights to bodily integrity and freedom from violence.

11. The Public Protector, the Human Rights Commission, the Commission for Gender Equality (CGE), and the Electoral Commission—what is commonly known as ‘gender machinery—put in place to instill the Bill of Rights.'

12. The Constitutional Court, the Equality Court, the Commission for Conciliation, Mediation, and Arbitration (CCMA), special family courts, and labor courts were put in place to allow women to seek legal assistance if their rights were violated.

13. The Recognition of Customary Marriages Act 1998 prevents the continuing disadvantage that women in customary unions encounter.

14. White women were given the right to vote in 1930.

15. The Women Empowerment and Gender Equality Bill (WEGE) 2013 allowed for the implementation of measures to increase equality, such as designing programs to ensure women held fifty percent representation in decision-making structures

==== The Bill of Rights ====
All women in South Africa were not formally recognized as equal citizens until the establishment of the Constitution of South Africa in 1996. This Constitution included a special section for women called "Equality." Sections 9, 10, 11, and 12 of the Bill of Rights allude to women as equals and the basis for how they should be treated. Section 9(3) forbids discrimination based on gender, sexual orientation, marital status, pregnancy, ethnicity, or culture. This is followed by Sections 10 and 11, which give the right to be treated equally and the right to life. One of the most significant sections is 12, which states the right "to be free from all forms of violence from either public or private sources." As domestic violence has been an issue for all women, this establishes that within the domain of a home or family, it is subject to public policy as well.

== Education, marriage, consent, prostitution and the HIV epidemic amongst black women ==
Research by the Gender Advocacy Program (GAP) found that black women have fewer opportunities for education, employment, economic participation, and political participation. This is further exacerbated when looking at apartheid's effects on black women's social standing in South Africa. It caused separate development, and the differences caused by the migrant labor guidelines damaged the social makeup of South African families.

=== Education, unemployment, and poverty ===
Education is an important factor in breaking the cycle of poverty and unemployment in South Africa, especially for girls from struggling townships. Girls in South Africa may face challenges in feeling safe at school due to issues such as bullying, corporal punishment, and gender violence. “The Study of Violence Against Children” and articles written by the UN describe the nature and extent of the violence in and around schools. It looked mainly at bullying, corporal punishment, and gender violence in schools and the community, which has shown ways in which schools foster gender and sexual violence as well as corporal punishment. Girls' attendance in school in South Africa may face challenges due to various factors, including distance to schools and gender-based violence. One-third of rapes were perpetrated by schoolteachers, which creates a difficult process for these girls to make reports and claims to the police. Schools in rural areas are at a distance from each other, which directly exposes girls to high-risk situations when traveling to school. There is a disparity in attendance between males and females in education in South Africa, which may contribute to the cycle of unemployment and poverty for women. In recent legislative efforts, measures have been put in place to try and improve the number of girls in education by trying to break the cycle. In 2003, the South African Minister of Education set up the Girls’ Education Movement (GEM). GEM is an African movement, supported by UNICEF, where children and young people in schools and communities in South Africa work to bring positive changes in the lives of African girls and boys. GEM aims to:

- Give girls equal access to education.
- Improve the quality of education, especially in disadvantaged schools.
- Make the school program and school books gender-responsive.
- Create schools that are safe and secure for children, especially girls.
- Work with boys as strategic partners.
- Decrease in gender-based violence.
- Abolish harmful cultural practices such as early marriage.

=== HIV epidemic, prostitution, and sexual assault ===
In South Africa, it is estimated that 5.5 million people are infected with HIV, and over fifty percent of those infected become infected before the age of 25. One of the main drivers for such large numbers is poverty and unemployment. Poverty is a contributing factor to the spread of HIV/AIDS in South Africa, as it can lead women to engage in prostitution for survival. Some women who engage in prostitution may not have access to sexual protection, which can increase their risk of contracting HIV. Sexual assault and rape can be a barrier to education for women in South Africa. The effects of poverty and sexual health such as HIV and aids can lead to further economic hardship for women in South Africa. In 2017, 26% of women were estimated to be living with HIV, compared to around 15% of men.

=== Marriage and consent ===
Many marriages within South Africa are pre-arranged by parents for reasons including social standing within a community. A lobolo is a bride price where the groom's parents provide a sum of money as demanded by tradition. Lobolo is a traditional practice in South Africa where the groom's family pays a bride price. Some men may view this as claiming ownership of the woman. This is why some women believe they are owned by their husbands, so there is a possibility their consent will not be considered. In any case, it was estimated that around one-third of women had experienced intimate partner violence in the past 12 months, a level that is similar across all age groups. Arranged marriages in South Africa may involve underage brides due to financial reasons within the family.

== During the wars ==
The Boer Wars were two wars fought during 1880–1881 and 1899–1902 by the British Empire against two independent Boer republics, the Orange Free State and the Transvaal Republic. ‘Boer’ is the Dutch and Afrikaans word for farmer.

Boer women, children, and men who were not fit enough to work for the British were put together in concentration camps during the Second Boer War. The first two of these camps were established to house the families of cities that had surrendered voluntarily. But very soon, families that were a burden for the British were driven forcibly into camps that were established all over the country. The camps were first used as refugee camps, but they later became concentration camps. The horrible conditions in these camps caused the deaths of 4,177 women, 22,074 children under sixteen, and 1,676 men, mainly those too old to be on commando. The white and black people were put in different camps.

There were 14,154 deaths officially recorded in the black section of these camps. It is estimated that 25,000 to 34,000 deaths occurred in the Boer camps, with 81% being children. These statistics, however, do not include the number of deaths that happened enroute to the camps and during capture. The initial investigation into these camps was prompted by white child mortality.

The role of children was very important during this war, and race and class affected the experience of each child. Children were often separated from their families and exposed to harsh conditions and diseases. Their health going into the camps was already deteriorating and significantly declined upon arrival. The conditions were inhumane, and families and children were crammed together. Such trauma also involved the separation from parents, who did not recognize the faces of their children when they returned home. Black children were also forced to work in Boer camps. Children did earn a little money for work as it was considered a contribution to their families. In Bloemfontein, the National Women's Monument was built in memory of the conflict and dedicated to the women and children.

During the Boer Wars, women and children were put in concentration camps by the British Empire. There were differences in the treatment of white and black people in the concentration camps during the Boer Wars. Field Marshal Lord Roberts had another motive for putting blacks in camps. Specifically, to make them work, either to grow crops for the troops or to dig trenches, be wagon drivers, or work as miners. They did not receive food, hardly any medical support, or shelter, and were expected to grow their crops. The strong-bodied who could work could exchange labor for food or buy a meal for a cheap price.

On January 22, 1901, the Boschhoek concentration camp for blacks had about 1,700 interned individuals hold a protest meeting. They state that when they were brought into the camps, they had been promised that they would be paid for all their property taken by the British. They are also unhappy because "they receive no food while the Boers, who are the cause of the war, are fed for free in the refugee camps.” While the war lasted, more and more concentration camps were set up for women and children, and more deaths were recorded.

== Key movements and groups set up to help women ==
=== Federation of South African Women ===
The Federation of South African Women was a political activist group formed in 1954. Women who protested Apartheid joined the Congress Alliance, a political coalition that fought institutional racial segregation that existed in South Africa from 1948 to the 1990s. The FEDSAW's first conference was in 1954 when 150 people attended to establish the core aims of the organization. The main issue was fighting back against the pass laws that controlled the rights of black people. The introduction of these identity documents meant they had to be always carried. These documents made it harder for people to migrate or find employment. Women were completely under the control of their husbands, which meant they could not own any property without the permission of a male. The ANC Women's League, the Communist Party, and trade unions were present at the conference because they believed the organization was essential for establishing equality for women in South Africa. Having these organizations present at the conference gave women the courage to make a dramatic change, as it was clear they had support from other organizations. At the conference, women discussed what they thought would be essential to improving their standard of living. They drafted a document called ‘What Women Demand’ for the conveners of the Congress of the People to incorporate into the Freedom Charter, which outlined the rights and equal opportunities they demanded. Issues discussed in the document were the demand for improved health care, education, and equal pay and rights. “The right to live where we choose." This statement from the document highlights that women wanted the option to move freely without the need for an identity card or approval from their husbands. Women felt it was crucial to mention as many basic needs as possible in the document to clearly show exactly what they had been deprived of. The Federation of South African Women joined with the same beliefs, common interests, and a strong political attitude in a bid to make genuine change and stop (apartheid) the minority of white settlers making economic and political decisions for South African women.

=== Women's March ===
The Women's March 1956, organized by FEDSAW, was one of the first public protests fighting against apartheid and the abolishment of the Pass Laws. 20,000 women marched to the Union Buildings in Pretoria, protesting legislation that tightened the apartheid government's control over the movement of black women in urban areas and increasing violence against women. Women across the country marched and protested for equal pay, rights, education, and opportunities they had been withheld by the government. They were frustrated that their freedom was restricted by identity cards. The Women's March saw a large crowd, and many women brought their babies on their backs. This demonstrated the determination of the participants to demand equality and freedom while fulfilling their maternal responsibilities. The stereotypical assumptions about women's lack of political knowledge and capabilities were proved wrong as the women who took part in the march showed the authorities that they were capable of staging a movement of great proportion. The march was a huge success judging by the fact that it inspired many women to get involved and make a difference. South African women were applauded for their bravery as they risked arrests and detention for taking part in the movement. This shows the fearlessness of the women, as they were not prepared to give up. At the march, women sang a song called ‘Wathint Abafaz', 'Wathint Imbokodo': You strike a woman, you strike a rock. This is significant as it brought together numerous backgrounds and cultures living in South Africa: Indians, black people, and white people. This song highlights the pride these women had in abolishing the abusive laws against them and fighting for equality and a better standard of living.

=== National Women’s Monument ===
A monument was placed at the Union Buildings in Pretoria to celebrate the 20,000 brave women that took part in the march, which is now celebrated as ‘National Women’s Day’. August 9 is a significant day as it shows the incredible courage the women had when protesting against passing laws, racial segregation, and inequality that were eliminated in South Africa. The monument is a legacy of the bravery these women had and is recognized by many worldwide.

== What has been done for the women in South Africa? ==
https://www.hrw.org/reports/2001/safrica/ZA-FINAL-03.htm

Many things have been done for women in South Africa. For example, the commemoration of the Women's March is held every year. Even South Africa's political changes and laws, such as the Bill of Rights, have had a great impact on the women in the country.

Despite the efforts made to improve the status of women in South Africa, gender inequality and discrimination still exist, affecting women of all races. Although gender inequality and discrimination still exist, the efforts made to improve the status of women in South Africa have had a positive impact on how women are treated. In this way, think about how little girls can now have an education without having to be afraid of going to school.

But not only the direct causes; also think about projects in which things against AIDS are done. By helping to do things against this disease, organizations are making sure that the children get a chance to try to live a normal life. It is a fact that many young South African citizens are born with HIV/AIDS. Many organizations work on women's issues. During the negotiations, an organization called the Women's National Coalition worked very hard throughout the country, collecting women's views on the country they would like to see. This culminated in women from different political parties becoming part of the political negotiations in South Africa. It also led to the development of the National Gender Policy Framework and the establishment of the (initially) Office of the Status of Women, now the Women's Ministry, and the Commission for Gender Equality. The big organization that was formed in 2006 to accommodate women from all political organs and walks of life is the Progressive Women's Movement of South Africa (PWMSA).

Woman's Net is a feminist organization that promotes gender equality in South Africa. Women also organize themselves in political parties, business organizations, academic institutions, trade unions, and other structures. Another huge issue in South Africa is the trafficking of women and pseudo-cultural practices that allow child marriages. These arranged marriages have destroyed the lives of many girls. This has changed in 2016 with the amendment of the trafficking legislation to include criminalization of the "ukuthwala" practice, which had been bastardized over time. There are many pieces of legislation that have been introduced to promote the protection of women in rural settings and those married through traditional customs; to protect women from domestic violence and rape; and to ensure their rights in political, social, and economic settings. The challenges remain the publicizing of these and the education of all citizens about the constitution and the progressive legislation.

=== Current events ===
There are ongoing efforts to promote women's rights and combat the persisting issue of violence against women in South African society.

In September 2019, women took to the streets for three days to fight against the national crisis of violence against women and children. Although President Cyril Ramaphosa assured the women that the laws would be reviewed, they were unsatisfied. Some women have asked for the death penalty to be established for those who violate women and children. The fight continues to persist in South African society as women continue to be mistreated and violated.

== See also ==
- LGBT Rights in South Africa
- Apartheid
- Human Rights in South Africa
- Feminism in South Africa
