= Gender equality in Azerbaijan =

Gender-equality symbol

Gender equality in Azerbaijan is guaranteed by the country's constitution and legislation, and an initiative is in place to prevent domestic violence. Azerbaijan ratified a United Nations convention in 1995, and a Gender Information Center opened in 2002. A committee on women's issues was established in 1998.

The Universal Declaration of Human Rights asserts that "all human beings are created equal", instead of "all men are created equal", to better reflect gender equality and equal human rights. However, women are still in need of additional protection to help them attain gender equality. In simple terms, gender equality means reinforcing the protection and promotion of women's human rights.

== Legislation ==
=== Constitution of Azerbaijan ===
According to the Constitution of Azerbaijan, men and women are equal before the law. The Constitution prohibits discrimination based on gender, including workplace discrimination.

=== Guarantee under law ===
The 21-article Law of the Republic of Azerbaijan On State Guarantees of Equal Rights for Women and Men, adopted on 10 October 2006, aims to eliminate all forms of gender-based discrimination and ensure gender equality in the political, economic, social and cultural spheres. All human rights are guaranteed to women and men. To implement the law, public authorities must regularly review legislation related to gender equality and amend it as necessary. The dissemination of information about gender equality and education in the field has been defined by the law as essential.

=== Prevention of domestic violence ===
A law to prevent domestic violence was adopted on 22 June 2010. The law focuses on domestic violence between close relatives to mitigate its negative legal, medical and social outcomes and provide legal and social assistance for victims. Although it does not state that its aim is to protect women, women are the victims in most cases of domestic violence. The law accepts the prohibition of discrimination against women as a core principle, enumerating three types of domestic violence: physical, psychological and sexual.

== International cooperation ==
=== Convention on the Elimination of All Forms of Discrimination against Women ===
Azerbaijan ratified the Convention on the Elimination of All Forms of Discrimination Against Women in 1995, and signed its optional protocol in 2000. The first government report to the UN Committee on the Elimination of Discrimination Against Women (CEDAW) was published on 16 September 1996. The convention clarifies the meaning of "discrimination against women" and assigns the state organizations responsible for taking appropriate measures to eliminate all forms of discrimination against women.

=== UN Development Fund for Women (UNIFEM) ===
Cooperation between UNIFEM and Azerbaijan has taken the form of the Women for Conflict Prevention and Peace Building in the Southern Caucasus regional project. The first phase of the project, aiming to promote the activities of women's organizations and support activists, leaders, and youth in gender equality, peace-building and conflict prevention, took place between 2001 and 2004. The project's second phase, from 2004 to 2007, built on the first phase and reinforced women's rights based on CEDAW, UN Security Council Resolution 1325, Millennium Development Goals and the Beijing Platform for Action.

== Gender Information Center ==
The Open Society Fund introduced the Azerbaijan Gender Information Center (AGIC) in 2002. The AGIC is made up of several women organizations: the Research Center of Modern Social Processes; the Association of Creative Women and the Azerbaijan Association of Organizational and Technical Development, both in Baku; the Shams Women and Youth Center in Mingechaur, and the Hudat Center of Youth Programme Development.

=== Research Center for Modern Social Processes (APEAT) ===
The Research Center for Modern Social Processes is responsibility for the center. APEAT has conducted studies in collaboration with other organizations, including women's business cooperation in the southern Caucasus (for the Eurasia Foundation in 1999); women in social conflict (for the World Bank in 2000); women in Azerbaijan society (for Altair in 2000); women against violence (for ISAR-Gorizonte in 2001); women in the local community (for ISAR-Gorizonte in 2002), and gender resources and development of the third sector in Azerbaijan (for ISAR in 2002).

=== Organizational and Technical Development Association ===
The Organizational and Technical development Association (an AGIC member) has implemented the following projects in cooperation with the Eurasia Foundation (which supported the association's creation): incubating nongovernmental women's organizations (2000) and women's businesses (2002), and marketing the third sector in Azerbaijan (2001).

== State Committee for Family, Women and Children’s Issues ==
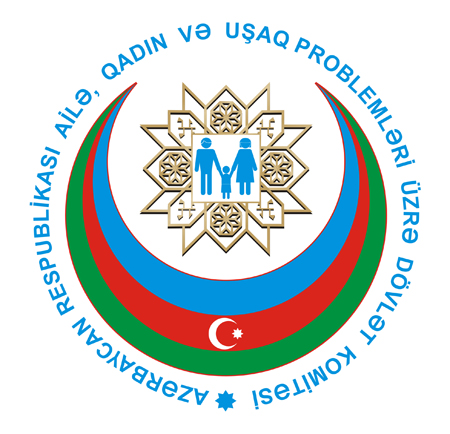
Committee logo

The State Committee on Women's Affairs was established by presidential decree on 14 January 1998, and was replaced with the State Committee for Family, Women and Children Affairs by another decree on 6 February 2006. The committee charter was approved by presidential decree on 9 August of that year.

The committee, a ministerial-level body in Baku (the Azerbaijani capital), is financed by the government budget and is responsible for implementing state policy on family, women and children's affairs. It may propose legislation and sign agreements with the relevant bodies of foreign countries and international organizations, in accordance with the Constitution of Azerbaijan, international agreements to which Azerbaijan is a party, and relevant laws.

== See also ==
- Women in Azerbaijan
