= Gender inequality in Venezuela =

Gender inequality in Venezuela is still an issue in the country despite measures aimed at curbing discrimination. Today in Venezuela no one is surprised by the use of "citizen and citizen", "lawyer or lawyer" and similar pairs. But what about in everyday language? And in visual communication, that which is part of the culture of the subtle? Is sexist still part of the usual lexicon?

== Statistics ==
=== Labor ===
In labor participation, the involvement of women raised from 17.5% in 1950 to 43.0% in 1998. This included married Venezuelan women who were able to dedicate less time to the workforce due to the traditional standards of establishing a family. However, there are differences in average income between men and women, favorable to the former, which are more marked in the informal sector of the economy. As a result of the estimation of a labor income model, it can be concluded that men earn salaries 20 percent higher than their female colleagues with similar education and experience, working in the same sector and occupation.

== Law ==
Under the Luis Herrera Campins administration, the Venezuelan government focused on revamping the nation's "family law". On 16 July 1982, the Congress of Venezuela approved changes to the law which granted Venezuelan women and equal power to their husband for making family decisions as well as the power to divorce their partner if they committed adultery. Previously, Venezuelan law stated that a wife "must follow her husband wherever he decides to live" and that the "husband shall make all decisions related to married life".
