= Luisa Amanda Espinoza Association of Nicaraguan Women =

The Luisa Amanda Espinoza Association of Nicaraguan Women (Spanish: Asociación de Mujeres Nicaragüenses Luisa Amanda Espinoza, AMNLAE) was initially established in 1977 under the name Association of Women Concerned about National Crisis (Asociación de Mujeres ante la Problemática Nacional, AMPRONAC). AMPRONAC was part of the Sandinista (FSLN) network which was set on bringing down the Anastasio Somoza Debayle regime in 1979. Shortly after the fall of Somoza, AMPRONAC change its name to AMNLAE, after Luisa Amanda Espinoza, the first women to die in the war against Somoza, but remained closely connected to the FSLN as their slogan suggests: "No revolution without women's emancipation: no emancipation without revolution."

AMNLAE was critiqued as being the submissive wife of the FSLN, and certainly not a feminist organization but rather a feminine one that fell short of full emancipation of women. AMNLAE membership subsequently dropped as women began resenting the close ties with the FSLN which resulted in advocacy for Sandinista priorities rather than that of Nicaraguan women. Additionally, women criticized AMNLAE leadership for their assumption that they knew what was best for all Nicaraguan women without reaching out to consult specific groups like the poor and working classes.

Navigating these different political scenes became a challenge for AMNLAE who eventually decided to elect its assembly in order to have a more representative leadership, but not before the FSLN interjected and placed five of its own trusted female militants into leadership in an attempt to increase the FSLN vote in the upcoming 1990 election. Despite these controversies, AMNLAE has been recognized as one of the first highly successful women's organizations in Latin America which was also responsible for spearheading one of the most democratic movements in the history of the region. Women in Nicaragua gained acceptance entry into the public sphere, recognition for their triple shift as well as rights to leadership and democratic participation because of this organization.

Luisa Amanda Espinoza Association of Nicaraguan Women is affiliated with the Women's International Democratic Federation.

== See also ==
- Sandinista National Liberation Front
- Role of women in Nicaraguan Revolution
- List of women's organizations
