= Gender inequality in Tonga =

Gender equality issues are becoming of increasing importance internationally, and in order to bridge gaps in the equality of men versus women, a thorough understanding of differing culture, gender norms, and the legal framework of a country is necessary to give policy suggestions that will decrease the discrimination women everywhere face. Tonga, a Pacific island kingdom, has low gender equality as measured by the Gender Inequality Index (GII).

Some critical issues to consider when examining gender inequality issues in Tonga include: gender norms, the legal framework of Tonga, gender equality treaties Tonga participates in, gender inequality policies the Tongan government implements, organizations in Tonga that are struggling to promote gender equality, and the economic opportunities available to women in Tonga.

== Gender Inequality Index ==
The Gender Inequality Index (GII) is a measure that attempts to identify how much women are disadvantaged in the areas of health, education and the labor market. GII ranges between 0 and 1 where 0 means men and women are treated equally, while a score of 1 means women are treated quite badly in these three areas. The GII is important because it illuminates the fact that gender inequality exists, and it seeks to guide policies that will promote gender equality.

In 2012, Tonga has a GII score of 0.462 and was ranked 95th out of 187 countries on this measure. To put this in perspective, the United States has a score of 0.256 and is ranked 3rd out of 187 countries, while Afghanistan has a score of 0.712 and a rank of 175th out of 187 countries. This puts Tonga nearly in the middle of the rankings. The GII is concerned with health, education, and the labor market participation, so looking at statistics for these areas can help identify how women fare in these areas.

Women have equal access to health care, and the life expectancy rate is 69 for women. The maternal mortality rate in 2010 was 37.5 per 100,000 live births, which places Tonga in the high human development category. The infant mortality rate is 21.5 per 1,000 births as compared to 4.1 per 1,000 births in the United States.

The second component of the GII is education. Women have equal access to education, which may in part explain Tonga's literacy rate of 99%. Women have recently surpassed men in the number of college degrees earned in a year.

The statistics for the labor market participation of women show growth. In 1990, 36% of the female population was employed, which had grown to 52% in 2003. 74% of the male population was employed, which shows a disparity, but the gap is closing. The unemployment rate for women, 7.4%, is higher than men, who are at a 3.6% unemployment rate.

== Gender norms ==
Men are the decision makers for their families and are expected to financially provide for their families. Husbands rank higher than their wives. Within a family, sisters are ranked higher than brothers and sisters hold a place of honor within their families. In particular, the oldest sister holds a place of honor, called fahu.

Within families, the expected duties of the brothers and sisters differ. Brothers are responsible to do any work that requires physical labor such as farming, mostly growing root crops, both for subsistence and commercial purposes, also fishing, and fighting in wars. Brothers are required to defer to their sisters, especially the oldest sister or fahu. Brothers also must speak respectfully about their sisters and the sisters of their father because brothers rank lower than sisters. Additionally, brothers are expected to support their sisters and all descendants of their sisters, but this element of the fahu system is beginning to die out.

Sisters also have expected duties within the family, but these duties are in keeping with the cultural view that women are light, easy, clean, and require little to no mobility. Women are expected to do lighter work like cooking, household cleaning and washing. However, any of this work that requires heavy lifting would be done by the husband or brothers.

Tongans are socialized into these gender roles from childhood. Boys are allowed to wander and explore whereas girls are expected to stay close to home. For adolescent males, wrestling, fighting, and smoking are typical behaviors. These same behaviors are unacceptable for adolescent females. Adolescent females by custom are closely chaperoned and stay near to home. When going out at night, a girl will go in a group with her friends or family. Sexual promiscuity is unacceptable for both boys and girls, but girls receive greater shame than boys do for engaging in sexual behavior before marriage.

== Legal framework ==
In respect to gender equality the Constitution of Tonga states, "No laws shall be enacted for one class and not for another class, but the law shall be the same for all the people of the Land". In some instances, laws are applied equally to men and women, but there are other instances where the law appears to favor men.

In 1874 when the Tongan constitution was created, the king wanted to prevent European colonization so a law was made stating that only Tongan men could own land and that land would be inherited through patrilineality and primogeniture. This successfully prevented colonization by outsiders, but the law also made it difficult for women to own or inherit land. Because women can't own land, women have to rely on men to get land if they want to start a business and need a space outside the home for the business. Women can lease land, but this is most easily done by leasing the land in the name of a male relative. As of 2010, there is currently a review of Tonga's land system, where the government is reviewing the issue of the access women have to land ownership.

In a divorce, men and women retain the assets they brought into the marriage. Generally, any assets gained during the marriage will be granted to the men. Another questionable law is when a man's wife dies, her husband will automatically inherit her entire estate. However, if a woman's husband dies, she receives only 1/3 of his estate while the other 2/3 will be split into equal shares for the man's children.

The government is comprised by more men than women. The legislative body of the government includes the king, 9 hereditary nobles (and only males can be nobles), and 17 elected commoners. Sometimes women get elected to one of the 17 commoner positions. All the CEOs of government departments are male, although 50% of their deputies are female. In the supreme court, all the justices are male.

== Economic activities and participation ==
The functioning of the Tongan economy is different from the Western economies and is therefore difficult to classify. Tonga does not have an individualistic, free market economic or social culture. In Tongan culture, it is important to take care of your family and neighbors, so everything, clothes, food, vehicles, money, etc. is shared. There is very little sense of ownership and personal possessions because if someone has a need, others will share what they have to see the need is met.

Families also have a system sharing all of their resources. Families will plan out their needs, and all the family members will contribute to see the need is met. These elements of sharing and contributing to support your family explain how Tonga receives 46% of its income. Tongans will move overseas to get better paying jobs so they can support their families back in Tonga through remittances. Other major sources of income include agriculture, fisheries, industrial, and the commercial/hospitality industries.

Since men are expected to do heavy work, the agricultural and fishery industry is dominated by men. A total of 30% of the working populations is employed in these industries. Women, however, dominate the handicraft, trade, and service industries, with another 30% of the total working population working in these industries. The difference in the industries in which men and women work is used to explain the pay differential that exists. In 2010, men working in agriculture or fisheries earned about 5 pa'anga per hour, while women working in handicrafts and service industries made about 2 pa'anga per hour.

In terms of occupations, men tend to hold managerial positions rather than women. Also, men own 65% of the businesses. This unequal distribution is likely due to land ownership rights that make it difficult for women to obtain land and run a business on. The size of the labor force has increased by almost 10% since 1990, and economists take this growth as a sign that more women are getting and keeping jobs.

== Policies to promote gender equality ==
One cause of concern for some people is that Tonga hasn't signed the Convention on the Elimination of All Forms of Discrimination Against Women (CEDAW), an important international treaty that the vast majority of countries have signed. There are several conjectures as to why Tonga has refrained from signing. Some people think the land ownership issues where only men can own land are the problem. Others say Tongans need to focus on becoming a full democracy because that would give women more voice in the government and likely improve their position as a result. However, some Tongans feel that women hold a privileged position in society already, so they see no reason to change the current system.

The Tongan government recognizes the need to address gender inequalities. There is a governmental ministry office to address women's issues. The Office of Women in the Ministry of Education, Women's Affairs and Culture is given the responsibility to uphold the interests of Tongan women. Some of the activities this ministry position oversees involve cultural development, especially in teaching women traditional handicrafts like making tapa mats. This ministry position is critical to promote gender equality, but is unfunded so progress is limited. One of the most important responsibilities of this ministry position is to enforce the Gender and Development policy that was passed in 2001. The national policy on Gender and Development has the goal of achieving gender equity by 2025 so all men, women, and children have equal access to economic, social, political, and religious opportunities.

One policy that would advance women's equality would be to enact maternity laws. As of 2012, women who are pregnant have to use their vacation and sick time because maternity leave is not a legal right. A policy granting maternity leave could make it easier for mothers to stay in the workforce if they so choose, but as things stand now, being pregnant and engaging in paid work in Tonga can be difficult. Another policy that could promote a woman's ability to work would be affirmative action laws so that women in general have equal access to jobs. This is particularly important because women are more likely to be discriminated against due to the costs a pregnant employee may have on the employer.

One recent policy modification that is promising is changes relates to citizenship and family laws. In the past, a child born to a Tongan mother overseas could not claim Tongan citizenship, although citizenship could be claimed through the child's father if the father was Tongan. In 2007, this law was changed, so children born to Tongan mothers overseas can now claim Tongan citizenship.

=== Treaties to promote gender equality ===
Tonga has signed several treaties involving women's rights and gender equality issues. These treaties include:

- Beijing Platform for Action of Women (1995)
- Millennium Development Goal (2005)
- Commonwealth Plan of Action for Gender Equality (2005)
- Revised Pacific Platform for Action on Advancement of women and Gender Equality (2005)

=== Organizations promoting gender equality ===
Two organizations have been established to support the Office of Women in the Ministry of Education, Women's Affairs, and Culture. These non-governmental groups focus on advancing the interests and opportunities of women in Tonga.

The first group is the 'Aloua Ma'a Tonga, and their focus is on empowering women. To meet this goal, they educate women about health issues, like the dangers of smoke inhalation from their cooking fires, and environmental issues like the dangers disposable diapers cause the environment.

The second group is Women-in-Law Association (WILA). The focus of WILA is to influence policy and legislation relating to women. Because Tongan law favors men, they also try to educate women about their legal rights in regards to divorce, custody issues, and abuse. WILA is also striving to get Tonga to become a signatory of CEDAW.

== See also ==
- Women's rights in Tonga
- Women in Tonga
