= Women and Gender Equality Bill in South Africa =

South African legislation

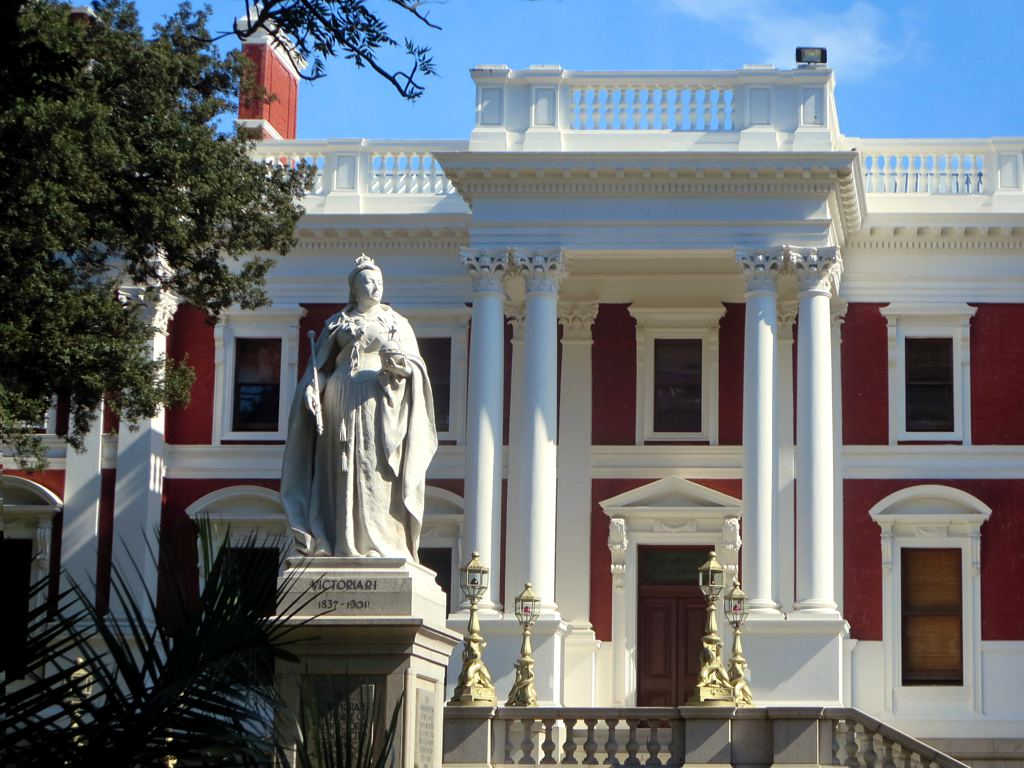
The South African National Parliament, through which the bill was passed.

The Women Empowerment and Gender Equality Bill (WEGE) aimed to promote equality between men and women in South Africa. The bill was passed in 2013, and allowed for the implementation of measures to increase equality, such as designing programs to ensure women held fifty percent representation in decision-making structures. The bill provides for both social and economic challenges to running for office, and makes provisions for enforcement. While the bill has faced some criticism that it offers nothing new to the nation, overall it was supported and passed through both houses of the national legislature, and went into effect in 2014.

== Contents of the Bill ==
=== Chapter 1 ===
Chapter 1 of the bill outlines the general provisions of the bill, including definitions of terms used in the bill, how the act will be implemented, and what the goals of the act are. The bill has several primary objectives. The first is to help implement aspects of the South African national constitution, a document which specifically guarantees equality under the law and prohibits discrimination on the basis of sex and gender. The act also aims to ensure that South Africa is complying with international agreements it has signed, like the Beijing Declaration and Platform for Action and the Millennium Declaration and Development Goals, both United Nations agreements working towards gender equality in nations across the globe. The act also lists one of its goals as achieving a minimum of 50% representation of women in decision-making positions, both in the private and public sphere. The bill's final goal is to provide for the implementation of public education on practices that discriminate against women in order to promote gender equality and social cohesion.

=== Chapter 2 ===
Chapter 2 of the bill deals with the social changes the bill brings about, dealing with issues of education and training, access to healthcare, and public education on prohibited practices.

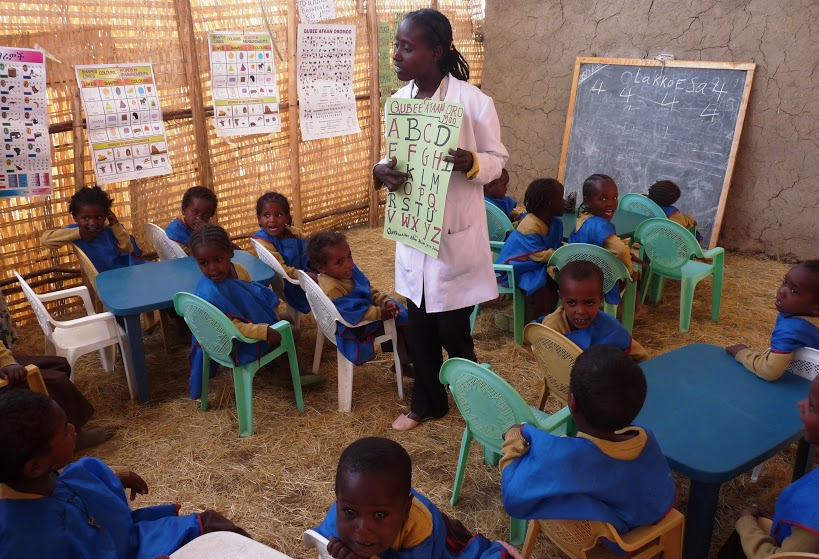
Early Childhood Education supported by USAID in South Africa

The first part of this section deals with education and training. It aims to address the lingering discriminatory patriarchal issues in the country, and women's lack of access to education. While women have increasingly gained access to education in South Africa, they are still vulnerable to lack of access and abuse within school situations. When given access to education, girls feel that it equips them with tools for life, and also gives them hope for the future. This section of the bill also aims to improve access to education on reproductive rights for women, particularly for younger women who have less access to this information.

The next section of the bill addresses women's access to healthcare. This section requires both public and private bodies to develop and implement models to deliver healthcare to women, specifically focusing on reproductive health and the goals of increasing reproductive rights for women in South Africa. Reproductive rights continue to be a concern for women in South Africa, as there is low support for issues like abortion. This section of the bill thus aims to increase women's access to healthcare, especially reproductive healthcare.

The final section of this chapter deals with public education on prohibited practices. In this section, both private and public bodies are mandated to develop and implement plans on educating the public on practices that unfairly discriminate based on gender. This is done for the purpose of achieving substantive gender equality in society and in the workplace. The bill specifically mentions gender-based violence as an unfair practice on the basis of gender. While 62% of South Africans believe that a man beating his wife is never justifiable, that still leaves 38% of the population that believes that there are some circumstances in which it is acceptable. As such, gender-based violence remains an important issue in South Africa.

=== Chapter 3 ===
Chapter 3 of the bill deals with equal representation and empowerment of women.

The first part of this section mandates that public and private bodies must develop and implement plans to achieve 50% representation and meaningful participation of women in decision-making positions. The bill mandates that this should be done by building women's capacity to participate, changing community attitudes to accept women in leadership positions, and to develop support mechanisms to help women succeed in office. The bill doesn't offer any specificities on how this should be done, or what support mechanisms should be used.

The next part of this section mandates that public and private bodies also develop and implement plans to ensure gender mainstreaming, like the integration of gender considerations by management positions, ensuring that gender equity analysis takes place in decision-making processes, and remedial measures. These remedial measures consist of things like preventing potential prejudice on the basis of gender, and reducing disparities between men and women in public and private bodies.

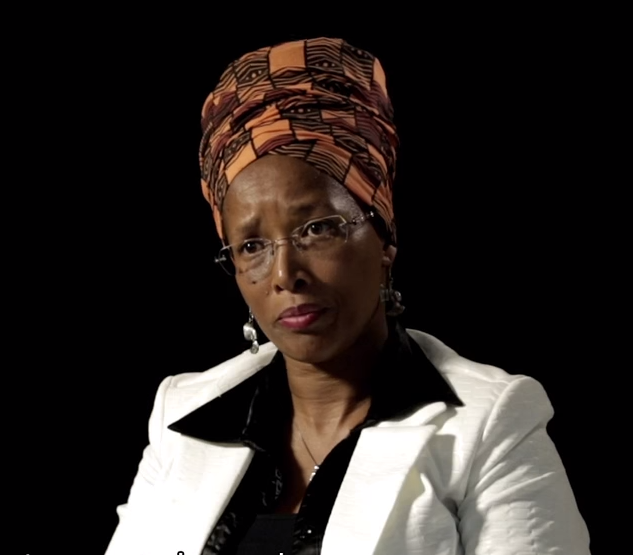
Elizabeth Petersen, a leading South African figure advocating against gender-based violence.

The next section deals with measures to ensure women's empowerment and eliminating discrimination in South Africa. Along with ensuring that women have equal representation in decision-making bodies, the bill sets forth several measures by which women's empowerment will be promoted. These measures include changing circumstances that limit the achievement of women, establishing programs to support and recognize women's role in a variety of sectors of life, and implementing legislation to ensure that these previous conditions are met. This section of the bill also mandates that public and private bodies develop and implement policies aimed to protect and advance women by ensuring equal opportunities for women, elimination gender discrimination, the exploitation of women in the labor force, and gender-based violence. While the bill doesn't offer specific measures or legislation to ensure these conditions are met, it does specify that these programs can include land reform, and gender initiatives in the workplace.

The bill then addresses women's economic empowerment. It mandates that public and private bodies promote the economic empowerment of women by promoting women's access to economic and educational opportunities, increasing access to financing, land rights, and entrepreneurial skills for women. It also mandates facilitation of employment opportunities and access to markets for women. Despite reform efforts in South Africa, the compounding effects of apartheid and gender discrimination have resulted in women being more likely to be employed in low-skill occupations, largely as domestic workers. Women are also more likely to live below the poverty line than men, particularly women of color in South Africa. This section of the bill aims at changing these conditions and advancing women in their efforts to overcome poverty.

The next section of the bill addresses the socio-economic empowerment of rural women in particular. Rural women are much more likely to be impoverished than their urban counterparts in South Africa, so the bill addresses the empowerment of these women in particular. The bill mandates that bodies develop plans to facilitate sustainable livelihoods for women in rural areas, prioritize gender in land reform programs to ensure women have access to those resources, and to improve conditions for women on farms.

The bill then makes brief mention of considering women with disabilities in the above measures, and ensure their economic success as well.

=== Chapter 4 ===
This part of the bill deals with governance, and the measures the minister may make to bring about these measures and ensure that public and private bodies are in compliance. These powers include reviewing plans by public and private bodies to meet these requirements, collecting and analyzing information on these plans, and establishing mechanisms to bring about gender equality. This section also mandates that public bodies establish a Gender Focal Point body made up of senior management to assist the public body in complying with the act, with their qualifications determined by the minister.

=== Chapter 5 ===
This part of the bill establishes the conditions for the minister to review public or private bodies and consequences for not complying with the bill. The minister can review the plans of a public or private body and can meet with the body to ensure its compliance with the bill. After this audit is conducted, the minister can approve the plans of the body, make recommendations, and must publish a report annually about the outcome of these reviews.

If a body fails to comply with this act, there are a variety of sanctions they can experience. If someone willfully doesn't comply with the bill, they can experience a fine or imprisonment of up to five years. If a body fails a review by the minister, they are also subject to a fine of 10% of their turnover. The fine is paid to the National Revenue Fund.

=== Chapter 6 ===
This part of the bill establishes the framework for regulations surrounding the bill. By notice in The Gazette, the government's official notice publication, the minister can publish a framework on women empowerment, and establish regulations about how to implement the bill. These regulations include establishing institutional mechanisms for promoting empowerment, equal representation and participation, and other procedures to implement the bill.

=== Chapter 7 ===
The final section of the bill deals with miscellaneous matters not covered in previous sections, including how the minister can delegate power to other officials, and when the bill will take effect.

== Criticisms of the Bill ==
While considered an advancement and potential step forward in the advancement of women's equality in South Africa, women's rights organizations critiqued the bill. Legal scholars have criticized the bill for being too vague in how it will be implemented. Critics argue that the bill is reminiscent of other bills, particularly The Promotion of Equality and Prevention of Unfair Discrimination Act passed in 2000, which critics say is identical to the bill outside of the 5th section of the act. In response to these criticisms, the Minister for Women, Lulu Xingwana, argued that the bill would help reduce income inequality between women, providing support for rural women in particular.

== See also ==
- Women in South Africa
- Women in Africa
- Feminism in South Africa
- Gender equality
- Violence against women
