= Timeline of golf history (1353–1850) =

The following is a partial timeline of the history of golf:

- 1421 – A Scottish regiment aiding the French against the English at the Siege of Baugé is introduced to the game of chole. Hugh Kennedy, Robert Stewart and John Smale, three of the identified players, are credited with introducing the game in Scotland.
- 1457 – Golf, along with football, is banned by the Scots Parliament of James II to preserve the skills of archery. Golf is prohibited on Sundays because it has interfered with military training for the wars against the English.
- 1470 – The ban on golf is reaffirmed by the Parliament of James III.
- 1491 – The golf ban is affirmed again by Parliament, this time under James IV.
- 1502 – With the signing of the Treaty of Perpetual Peace between England and Scotland, the ban on golf is lifted.
  - James IV makes the first recorded purchase of golf equipment, a set of golf clubs from a bow-maker in Perth.
- 1513 – Queen Catherine, queen consort of England, in a letter to Cardinal Wolsey, refers to the growing popularity of golf in England.
- 1527 – The first commoner recorded as a golfer is Sir Robert Maule, described as playing on Barry Links, Angus (near the modern-day town of Carnoustie).
- 1552 – The first recorded evidence of golf at St. Andrews, Fife.
- 1553 – The Archbishop of St Andrews issues a decree giving the local populace the right to play golf on the links at St. Andrews.
- 1567 – Mary, Queen of Scots, seen playing golf at Seton Palace shortly after the death of her husband Lord Darnley, is the first known female golfer.
- 1589 – Golf is banned in the Blackfriars Yard, Glasgow. This is the earliest reference to golf in the west of Scotland.
- 1592 – The Royal Burgh of Edinburgh bans golfing at Leith on Sunday "in tyme of sermonis." (Eng: sermons)
- 1618 –
  - King James VI of Scotland and I of England confirms the right of the populace to play golf on Sundays.
- 1621 – First recorded reference to golf on the links of Dornoch (later Royal Dornoch), in the far north of Scotland.
- 1641 – Charles I is playing golf at Leith when he learns of the Irish rebellion, marking the beginning of the English Civil War. He finishes his round.
- 1642 – John Dickson receives a licence as ball-maker for Aberdeen.
- 1658 – Golf is banned from the streets of Albany, New York-the first reference to golf in America.
- 1682 – In the first recorded international golf match, the Duke of York and John Patersone of Scotland defeat two English noblemen in a match played on the links of Leith.
  - Andrew Dickson, carrying clubs for the Duke of York, is the first recorded caddie.
- 1687 – The student diary of Thomas Kincaid includes his Thoughts on Golve, and contains the first instructions on playing golf and an explanation of how golf clubs are produced.
- 1721 – Earliest reference to golf on Glasgow Green, the first named course in the west of Scotland.
- 1724 – "A solemn match of golf" between Alexander Elphinstone and Captain John Porteous becomes the first match reported in a newspaper. Elphinstone fights and wins a duel on the same ground in 1729.
- 1735 – The Royal Burgess Golfing Society of Edinburgh is recorded as having formed; it claims to be the oldest golfing society in the world.
- 1743 – Thomas Mathison's epic The Goff is the first literary effort devoted to golf.
- 1744 – The Honourable Company of Edinburgh Golfers is formed, playing at Leith links. It is the first golf club.
  - The Royal Burgh of Edinburgh pays for a Silver Cup to be awarded to the annual champion in an open competition played at Leith. John Rattray is the first champion.
- 1754 – Golfers at St. Andrews purchase a Silver Cup for an open championship played on the Old Course. Bailie William Landale is the first champion.
  - The first codified Rules of Golf are published by the St. Andrews Golfers (later The Royal and Ancient Golf Club of St Andrews).
- 1759 – Earliest reference to stroke play, at St. Andrews. Previously, all play was matchplay.
- 1761 – The Bruntsfield Links Golfing Society of Edinburgh is formed.
- 1764 – The competition for the Silver Club at Leith is restricted to members of the Honourable Company of Edinburgh Golfers.
  - The first four holes at St. Andrews are combined into two, reducing the round from twenty-two holes (11 out and in) to 18 (nine out and in). St. Andrews is the first 18-hole golf course and sets the standard for future courses.
- 1766 – The Blackheath Club in London becomes the first golf club formed outside Scotland.
- 1767 – The score of 94 returned by James Durham at St. Andrews in the Silver Cup competition sets a record unbroken for 86 years.
- 1768 – The Golf House at Leith is erected. It is the first golf clubhouse.
- 1773 – Competition at St. Andrews is restricted to members of the Leith and St. Andrews societies.
- 1774 – Thomas McMillan offers a Silver Cup for competition at Musselburgh, East Lothian. He wins the first championship.
  - The first part-time golf course professional (at the time also the greenkeeper) is hired, by the Edinburgh Burgess Society.
- 1780 – The Society of Golfers at Aberdeen (later the Royal Aberdeen Golf Club) is formed.
- 1783 – A Silver Club is offered for competition at Glasgow.
- 1786 – The South Carolina Golf Club is formed in Charleston, the first golf club outside of the United Kingdom.
  - The Crail Golfing Society is formed.
- 1788 – The Honourable Company of Edinburgh Golfers requires members to wear club uniform when playing on the links.
- 1797 – The Burntisland Golf Club is formed.
  - The town of St. Andrews sells the land containing the Old Course (known then as Pilmor Links), to Thomas Erskine for £805. Erskine was required to preserve the course for golf.
- 1806 – The St. Andrews Club chooses to elect its captains rather than award captaincy to the winner of the Silver Cup. Thus begins the tradition of the Captain "playing himself into office" by hitting a single shot before the start of the annual competition.
- 1810 – Earliest recorded reference to a women's competition at Musselburgh.
- 1824 – The Perth Golfing Society is formed, later Royal Perth (the first club so honoured).
- 1828 – The first references indicating that hickory was used for golf shafts appears in identical articles in The Sporting Chronicle and The Sporting Magazine.
- 1829 – The Dum Dum Golfing Club, later Calcutta Golf Club (and later still Royal Calcutta) is formed.
- 1832 – The North Berwick Club is founded, the first to include women in its activities, although they are not permitted to play in competitions.
- 1833 – King William IV confers the distinction of "Royal" on the Perth Golfing Society; as Royal Perth, it is the first Club to hold the distinction.
  - The St. Andrews Golfers ban the stymie, but rescind the ban one year later.
- 1834 – William IV confers the title ""Royal and Ancient" on the Golf Club at St. Andrews.
- 1836 – The Honourable Company of Edinburgh Golfers abandons the deteriorating Leith Links, moving to Musselburgh.
  - The longest drive ever recorded with a feathery ball, 361 yards, was achieved with a following wind by Samuel Messieux on the Old Course at St Andrews.
- 1842 – The Bombay Golfing Society (later Royal Bombay) is founded.
- 1844 – Blackheath follows Leith in expanding its course from five to seven holes. North Berwick also had seven holes at the time, although the trend toward a standard eighteen had begun.
- 1848 – Invention of the "guttie," the gutta-percha ball. It flies further than the feathery and is much less expensive to make. It contributes greatly to the expansion of the game.
