= Ulmus minor 'Umbraculifera Gracilis' =

Elm cultivar

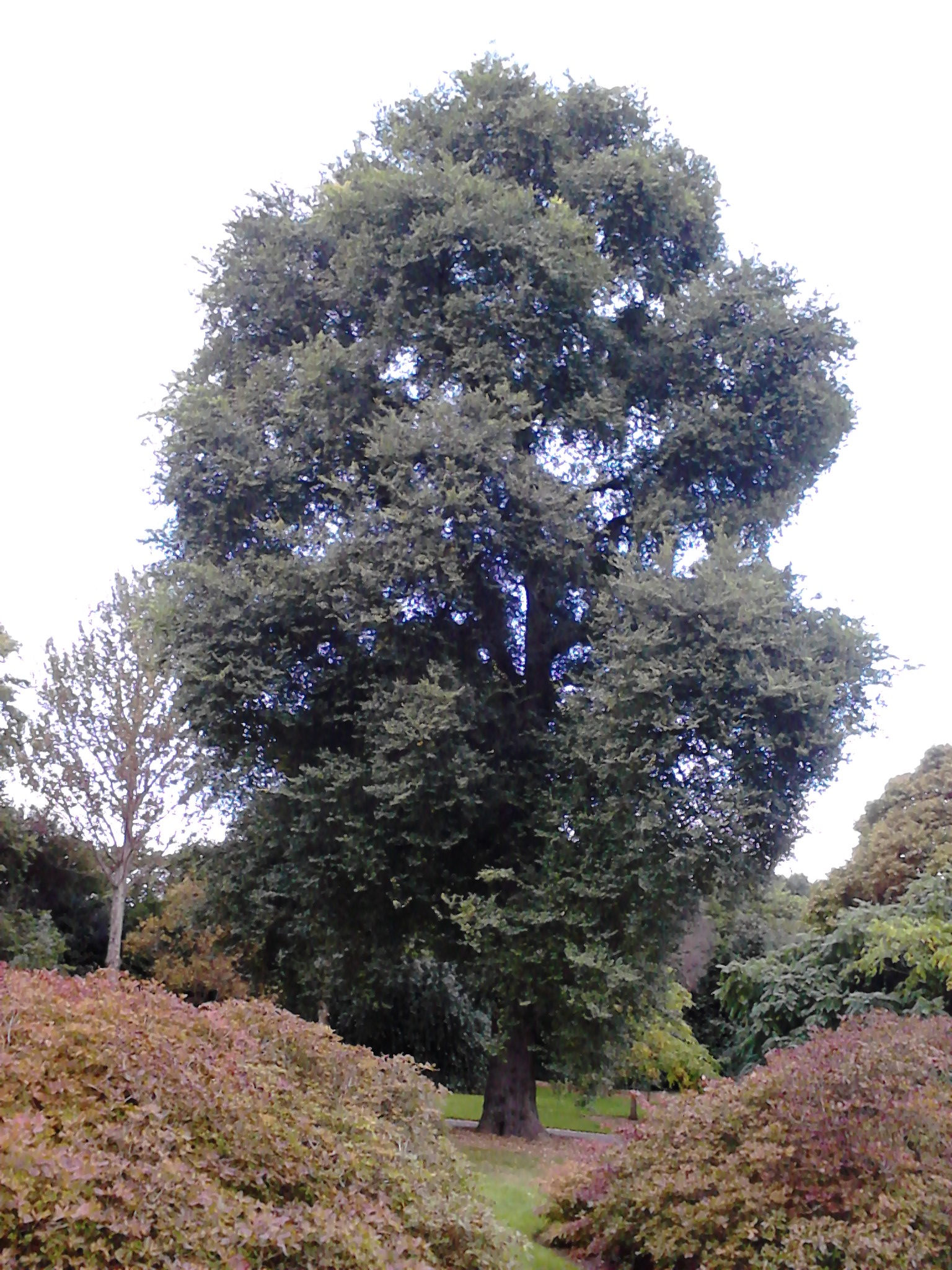
- 'Umbraculifera Gracilis', Royal Botanic Gardens, Edinburgh
- Species: Ulmus minor
- Cultivar: 'Umbraculifera Gracilis'
- Origin: Späth nursery, Berlin, Germany

The Field Elm cultivar Ulmus minor 'Umbraculifera Gracilis' was obtained as a sport of the Central Asian variety 'Umbraculifera' by the Späth nursery of Berlin c.1897. It was marketed by the Späth nursery in the early 20th century, and by the Hesse Nursery of Weener, Germany, in the 1930s.

== Description ==
The tree is distinguished by its long oval crown, but with thinner branches and smaller leaves than 'Umbraculifera'.

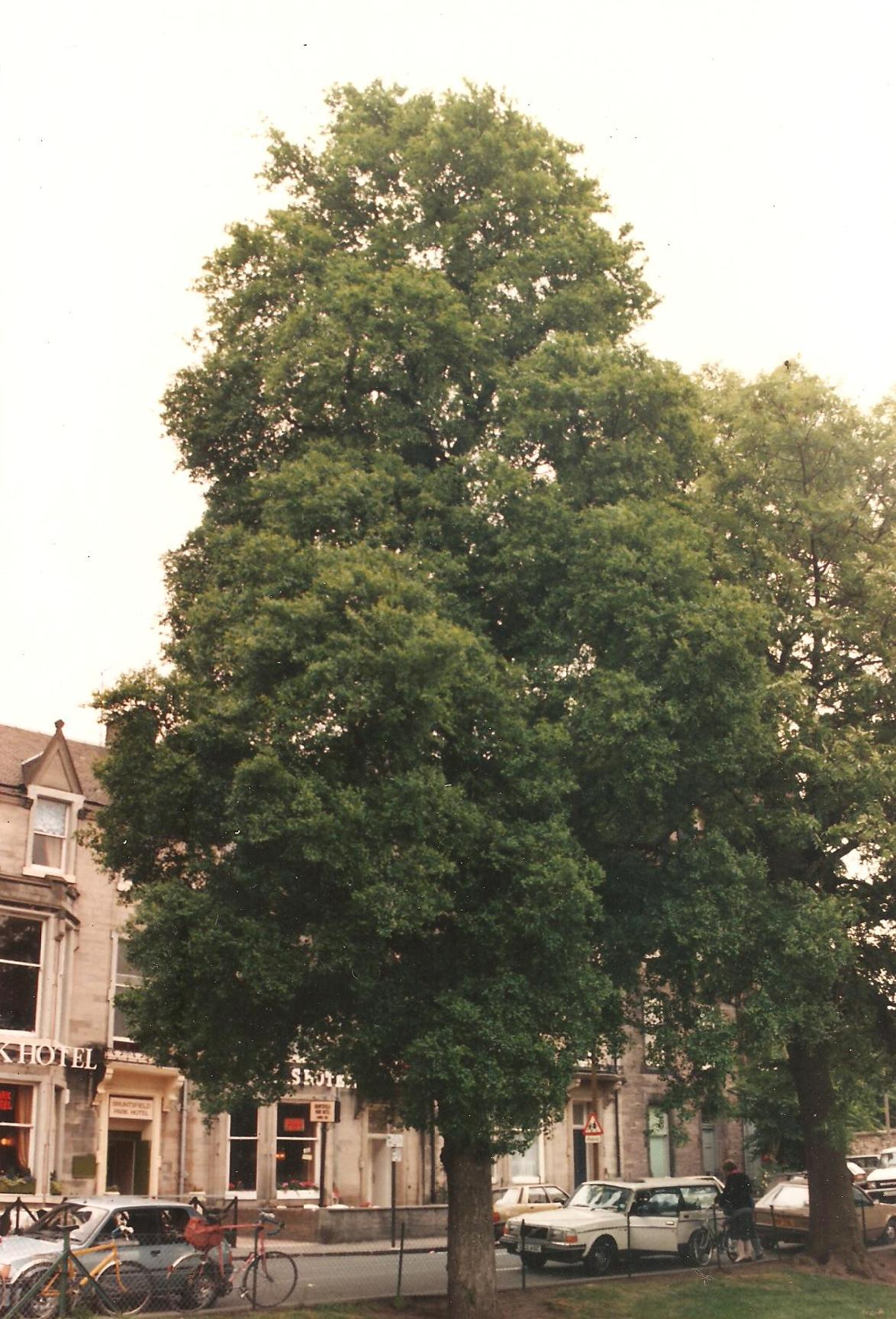
'Umbraculifera Gracilis', Bruntsfield Links, Edinburgh (1989)

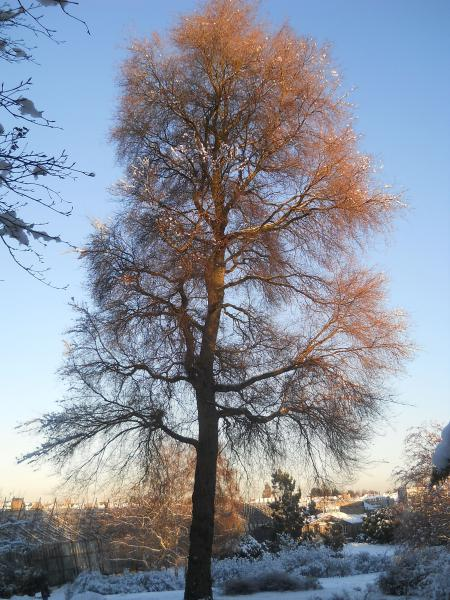
'Umbraculifera Gracilis', winter, Royal Botanic Garden, Edinburgh

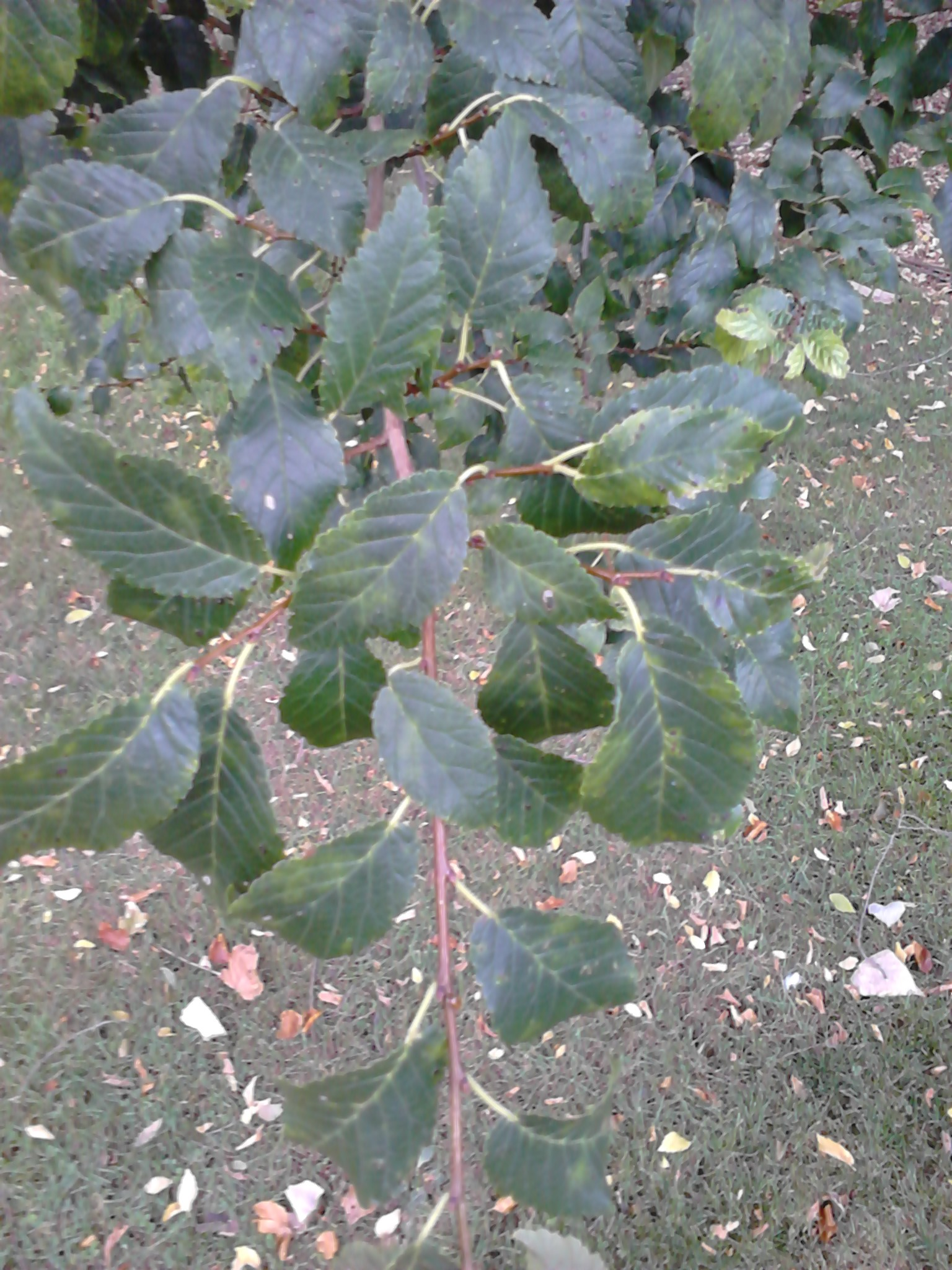
Foliage, RBGE, October

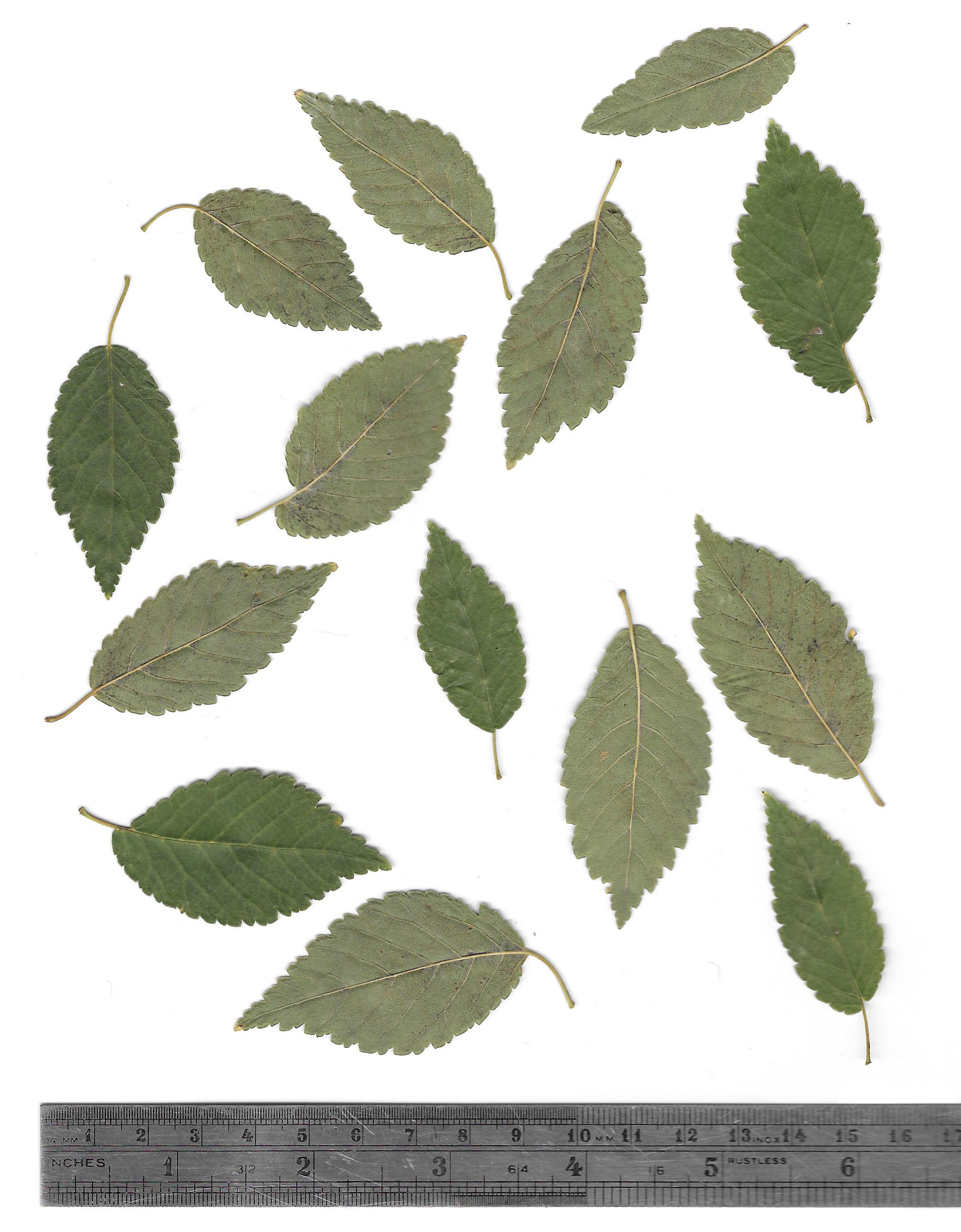
Pressed leaves of Bruntsfield Links specimen

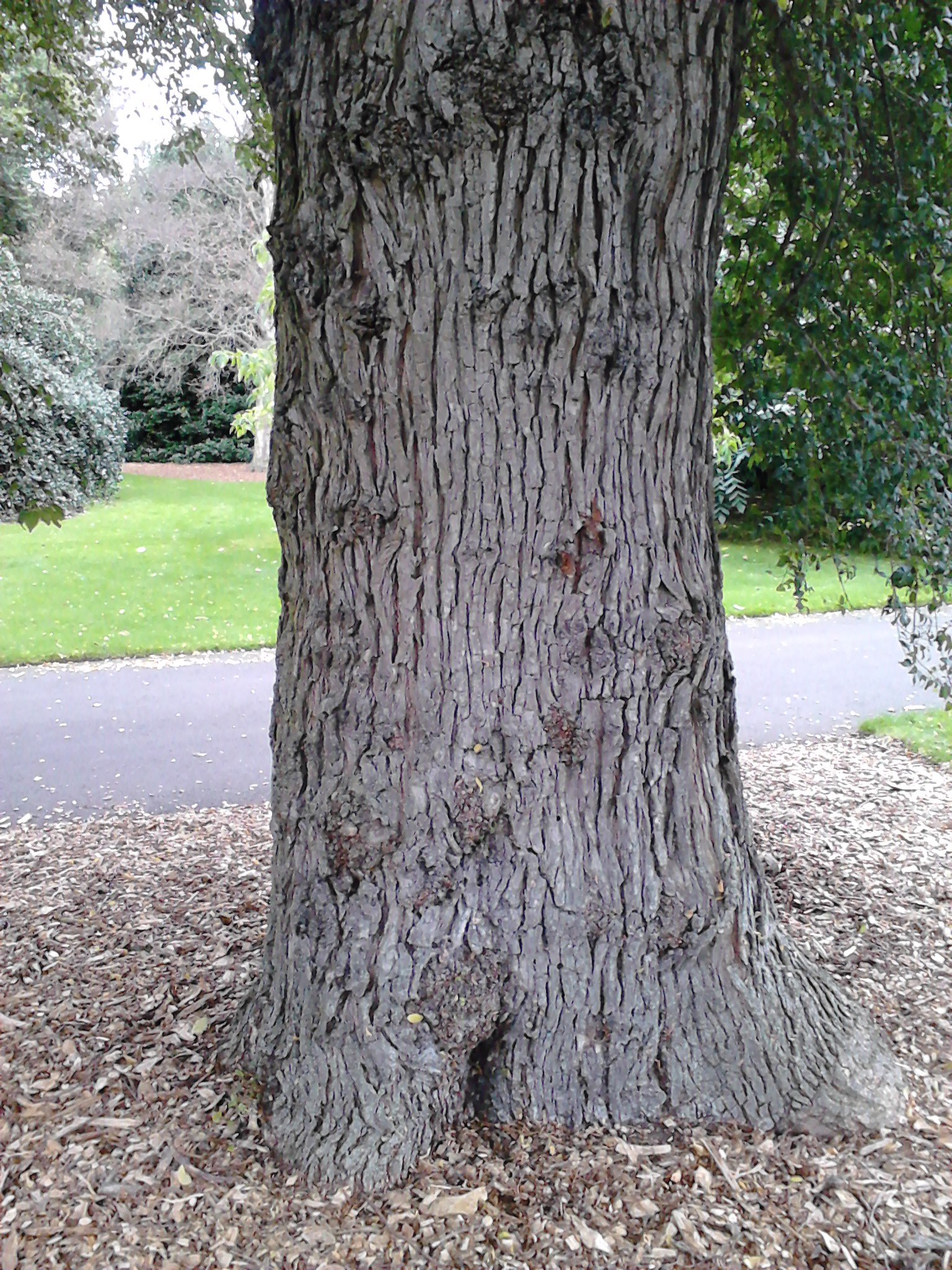
Bole, RBGE, showing graft-mark bottom right

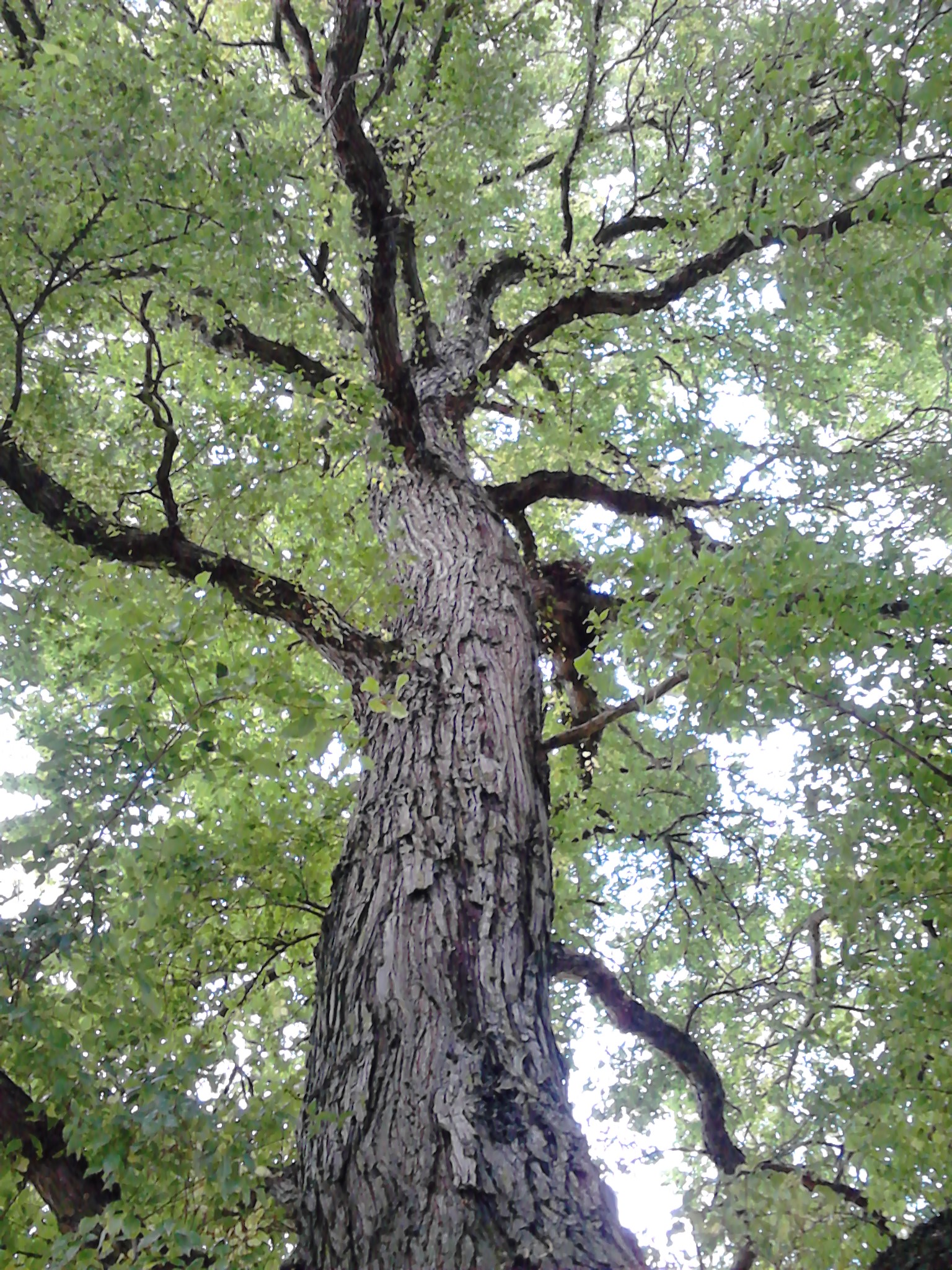
Trunk and branching of Bruntsfield Links tree

== Pests and diseases ==
The cultivar is susceptible to Dutch elm disease.

== Cultivation ==
The only known surviving specimens are in the United States and Scotland (see 'Accessions' and 'Notable trees'). Henry (1913) mentions no example at Kew, though a specimen had been planted there by 1902. A specimen obtained from Späth stood in the Ryston Hall arboretum, Norfolk, in the early 20th century. 'Umbraculifera Gracilis' has been included in the propagation programme (2017) of Royal Botanic Garden Edinburgh.

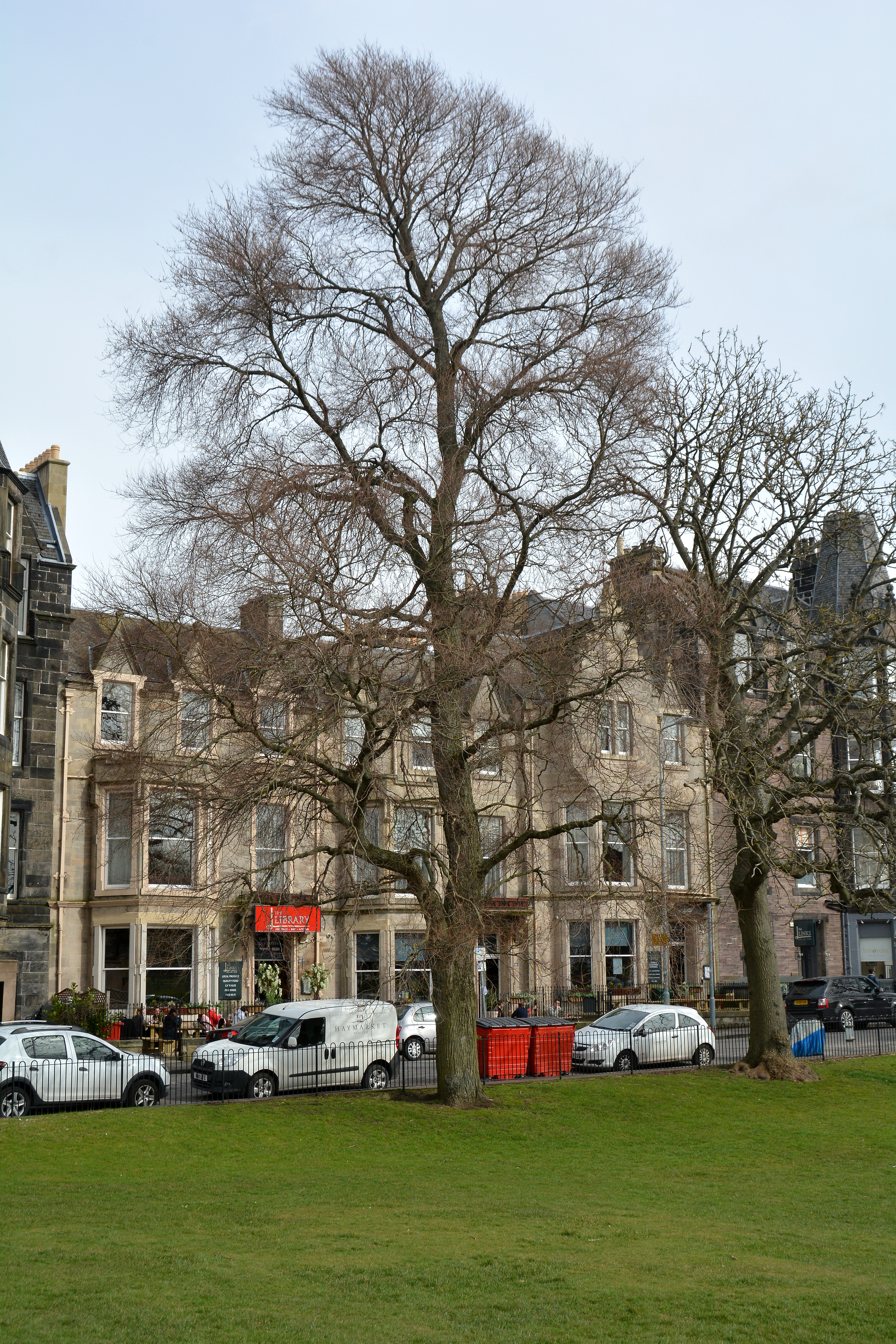
'Umbraculifera Gracilis', Bruntsfield Links, Edinburgh (April 2015)

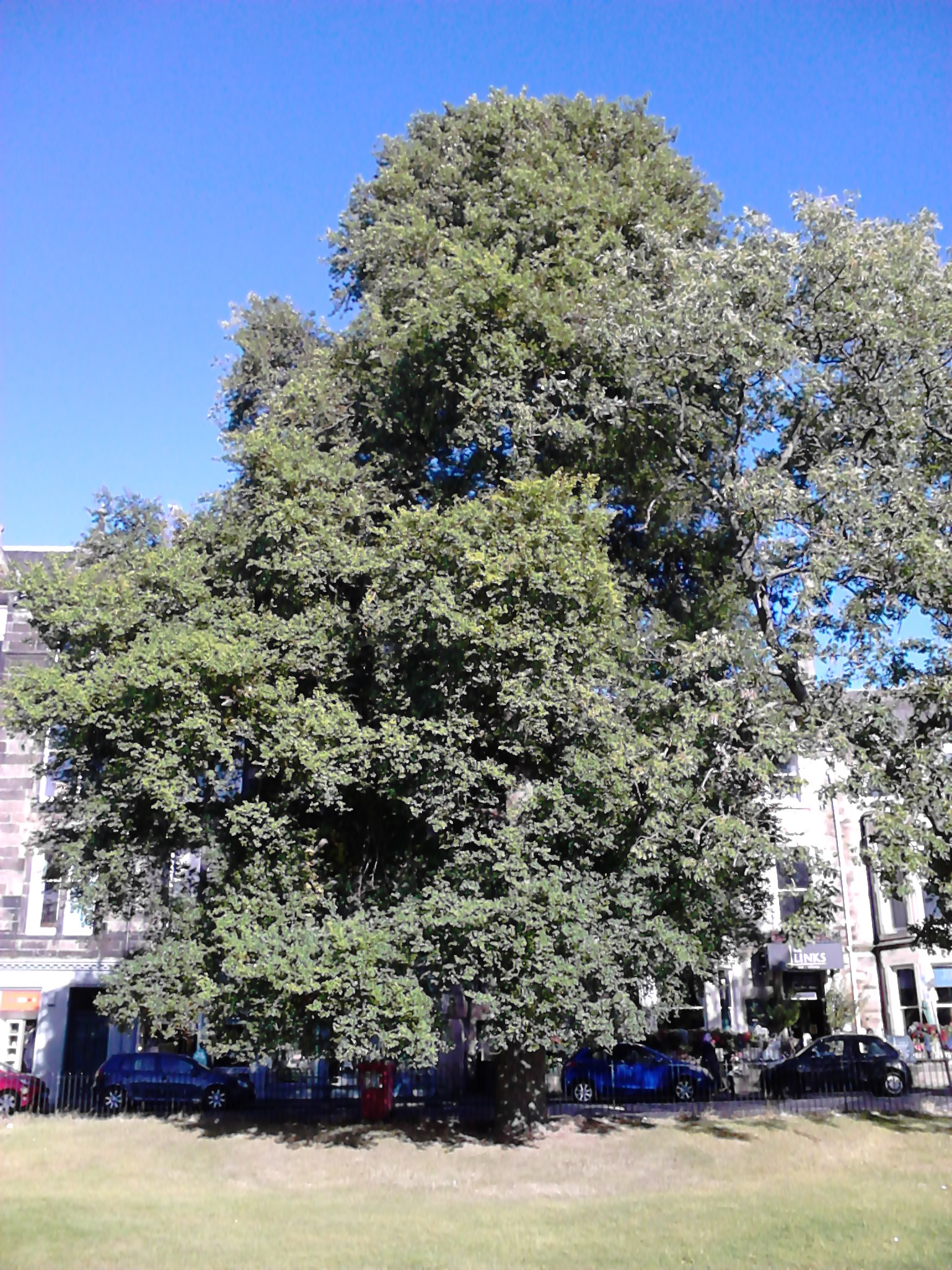
Same (October 2016)

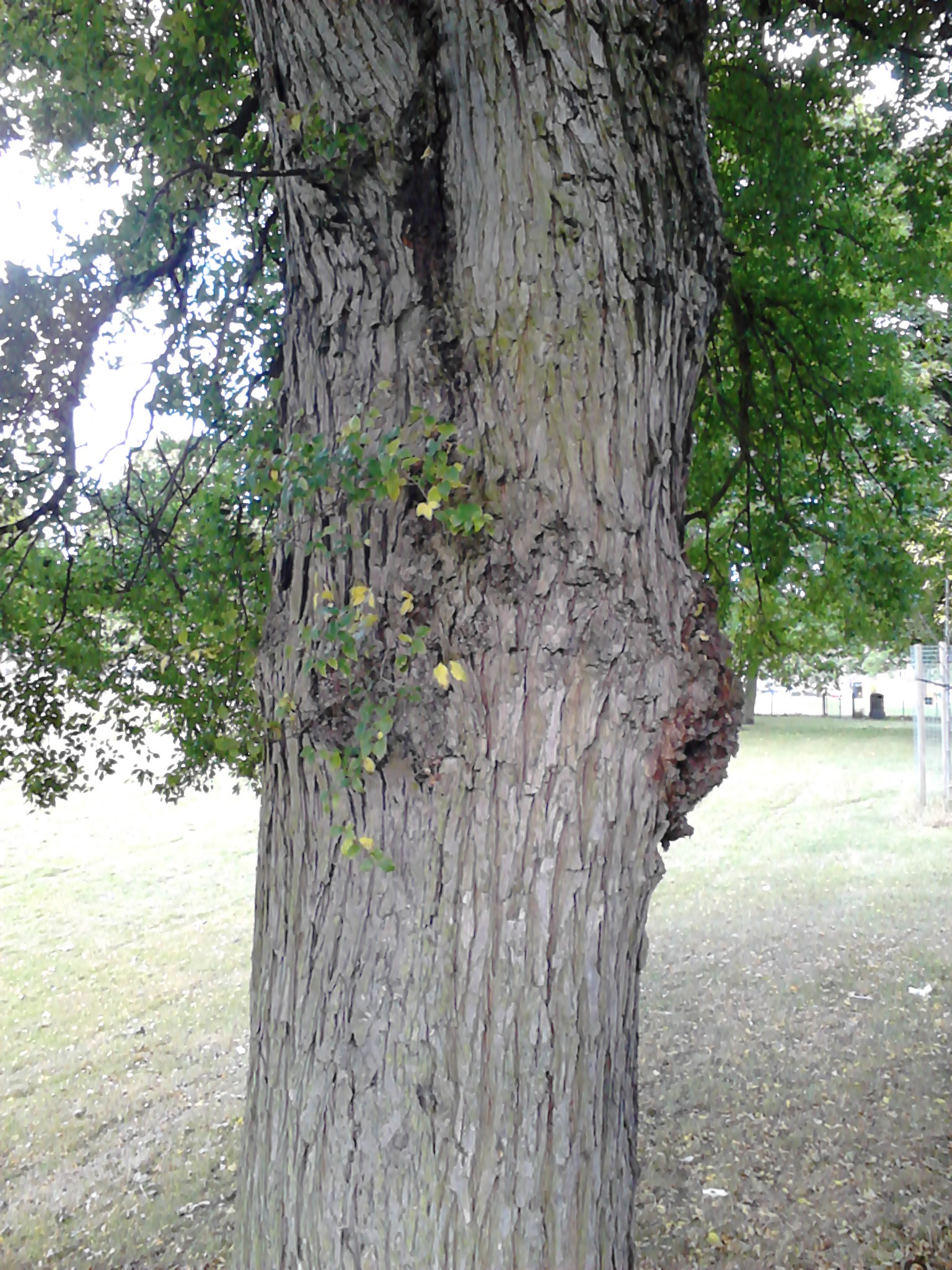
Bark and foliage of same

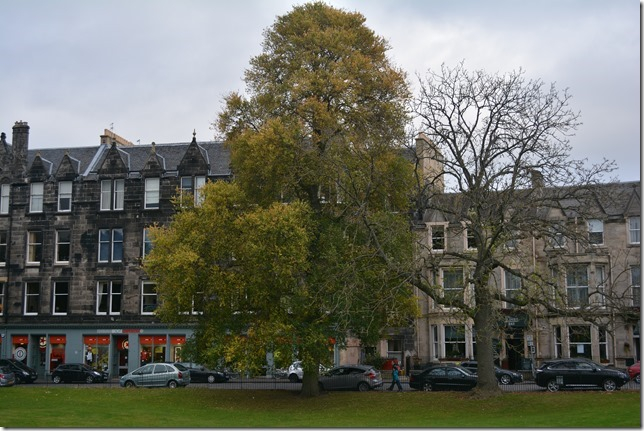
Early autumn colour of same (2014)

=== Putative specimen ===
A slow-growing, dense-crowned old elm (15 m, girth 2 m), with leaves resembling those of 'Umbraculifera Gracilis', stood near Lower Granton Rd, Edinburgh till 2025, in a garden that was once part of the grounds of Wardie House (demolished 1955). It was assumed to have been grown from a cutting from one of Edinburgh's three original specimens.

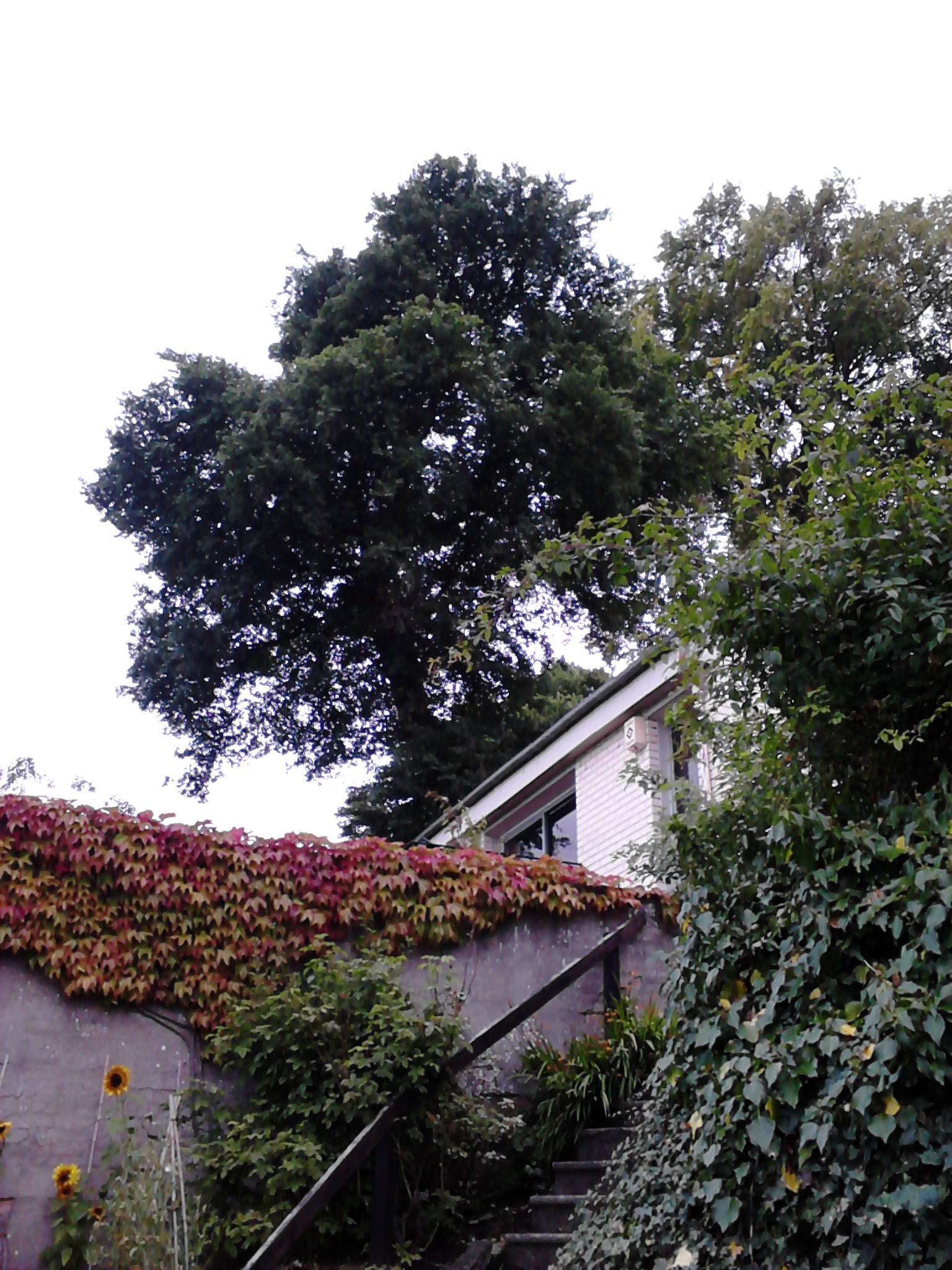
Lower Granton Road tree, Edinburgh, September

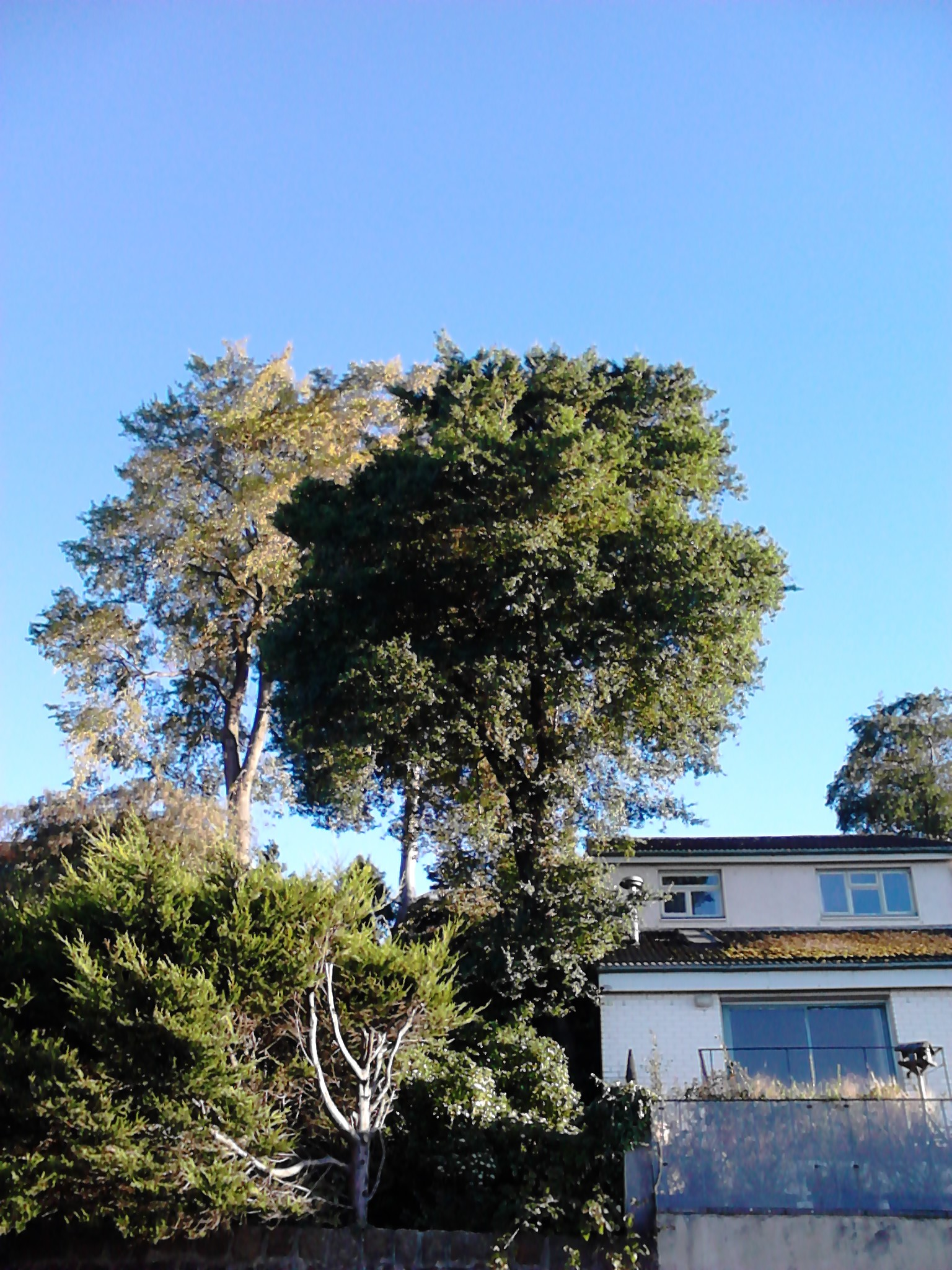
Same, October (front tree; wych behind)

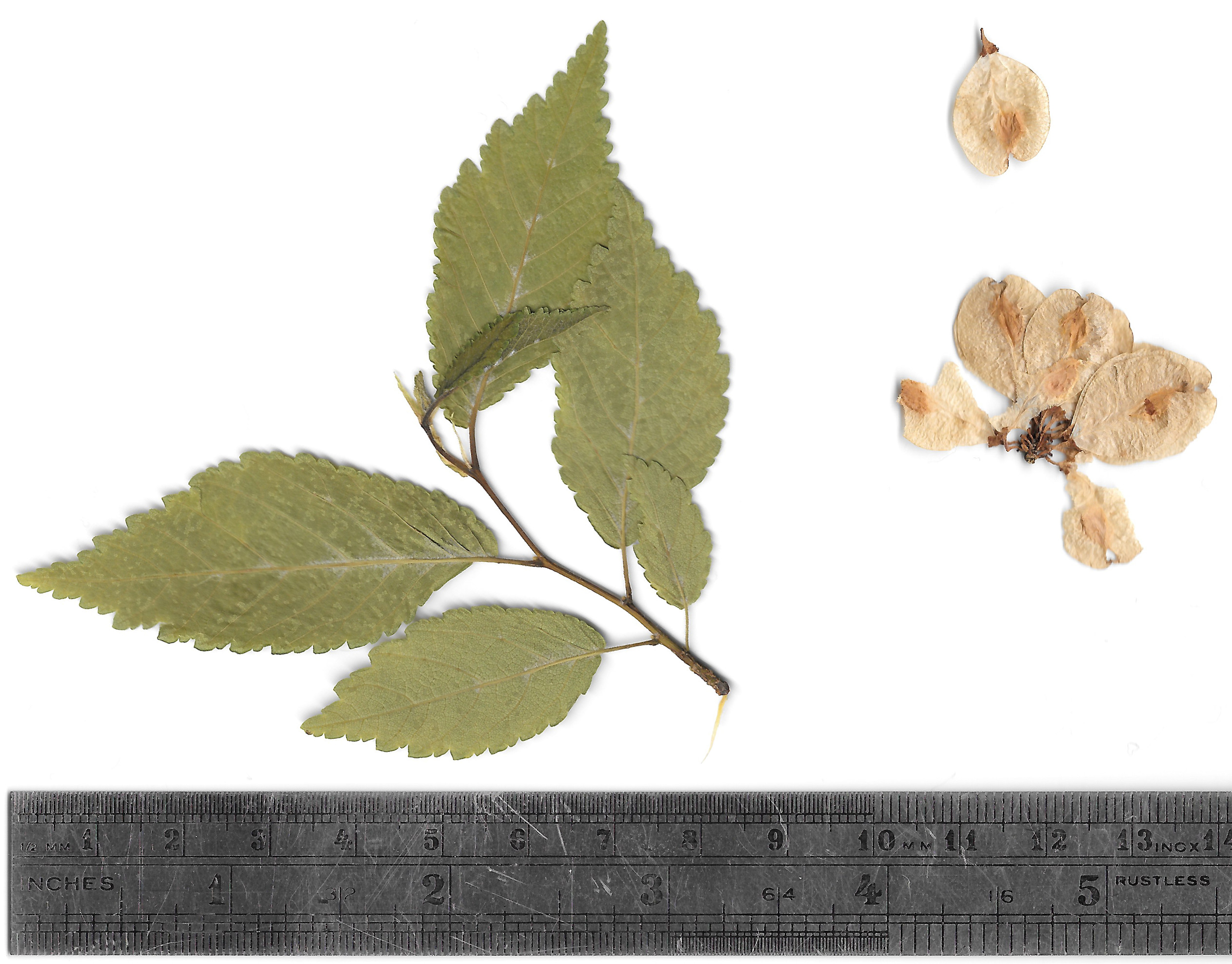
Samarae and canopy long-shoot leaves

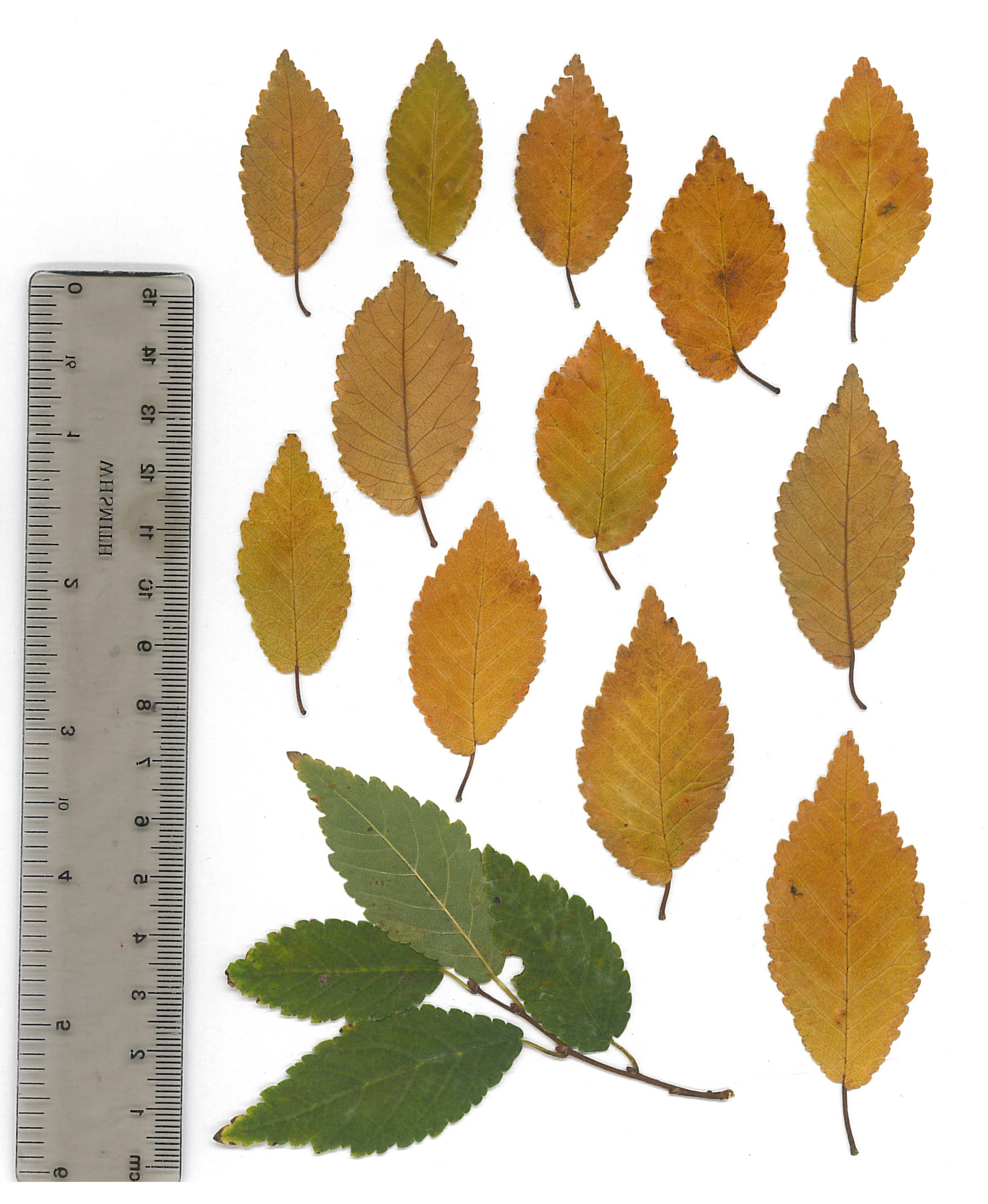
Pressed short- and long-shoot canopy leaves

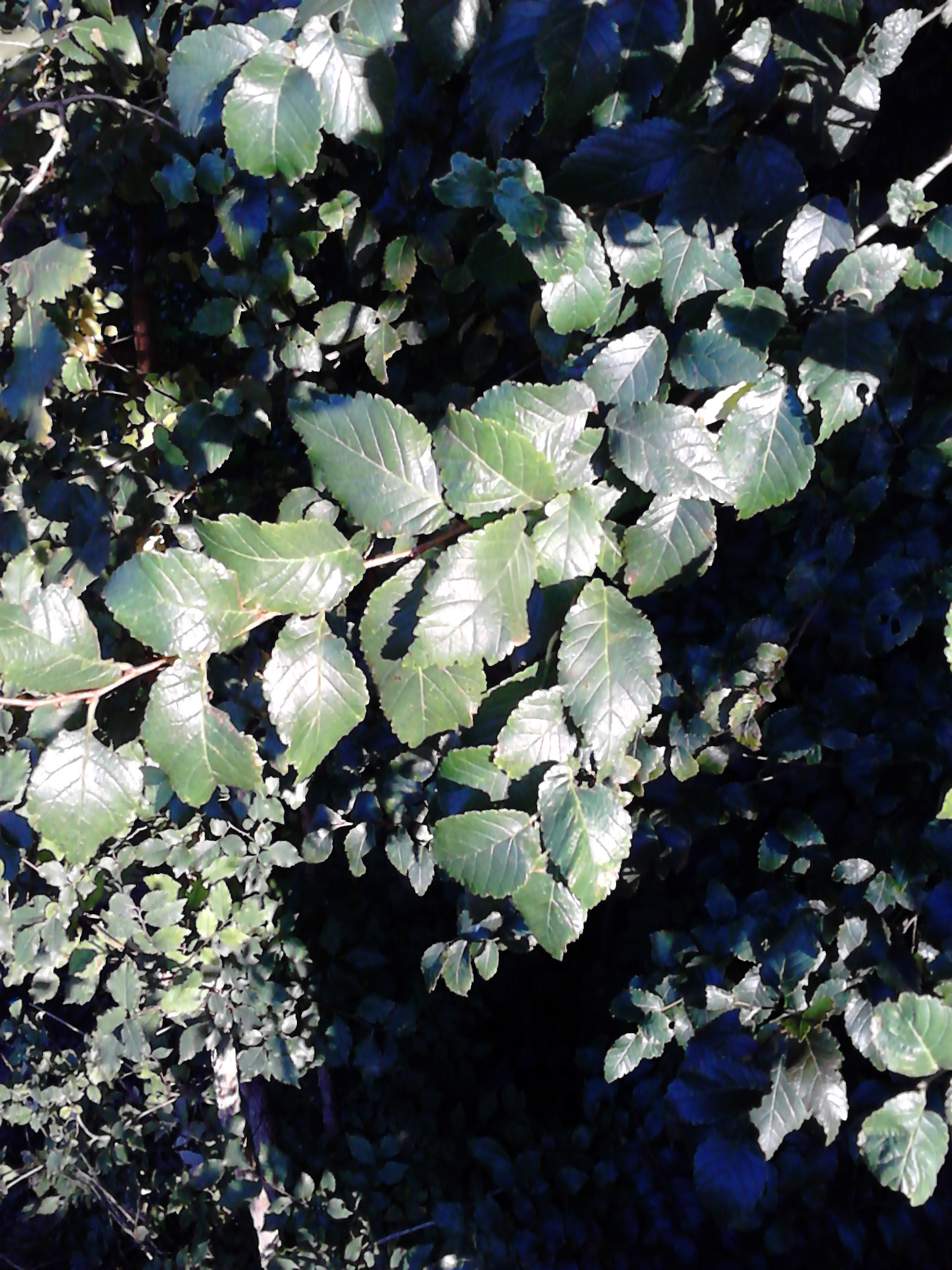
Epicormic long shoot

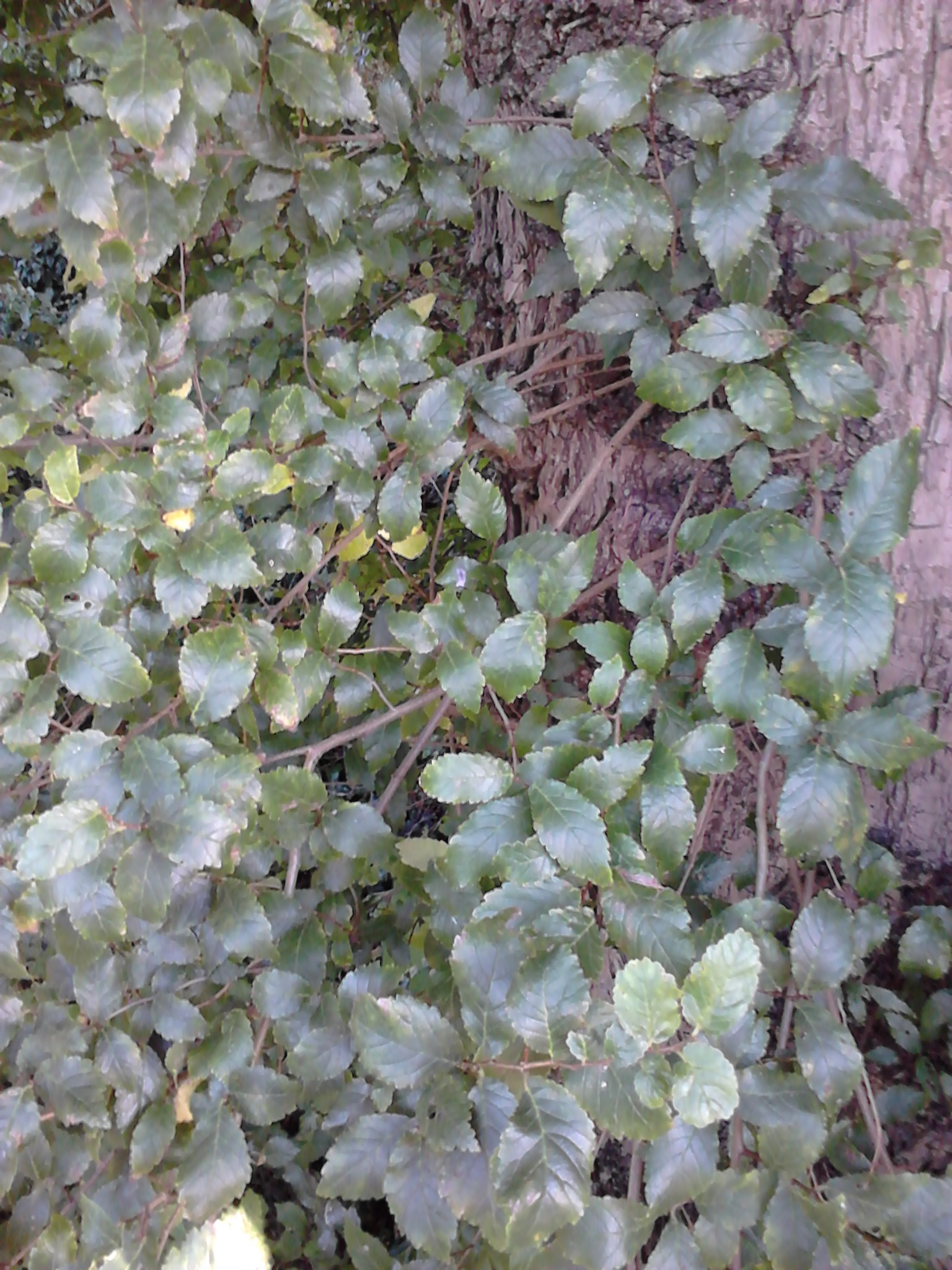
Epicormic foliage

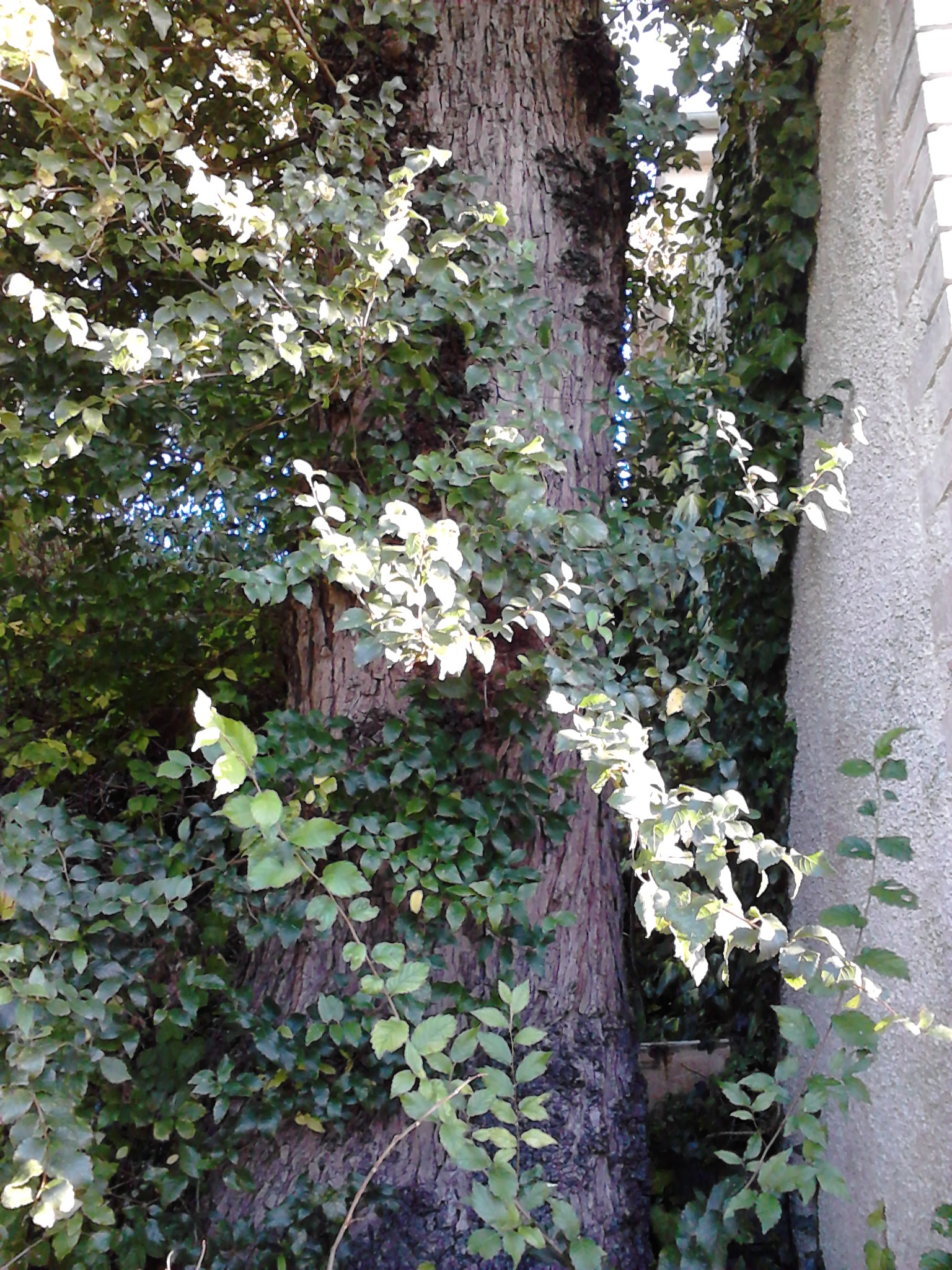
Bark

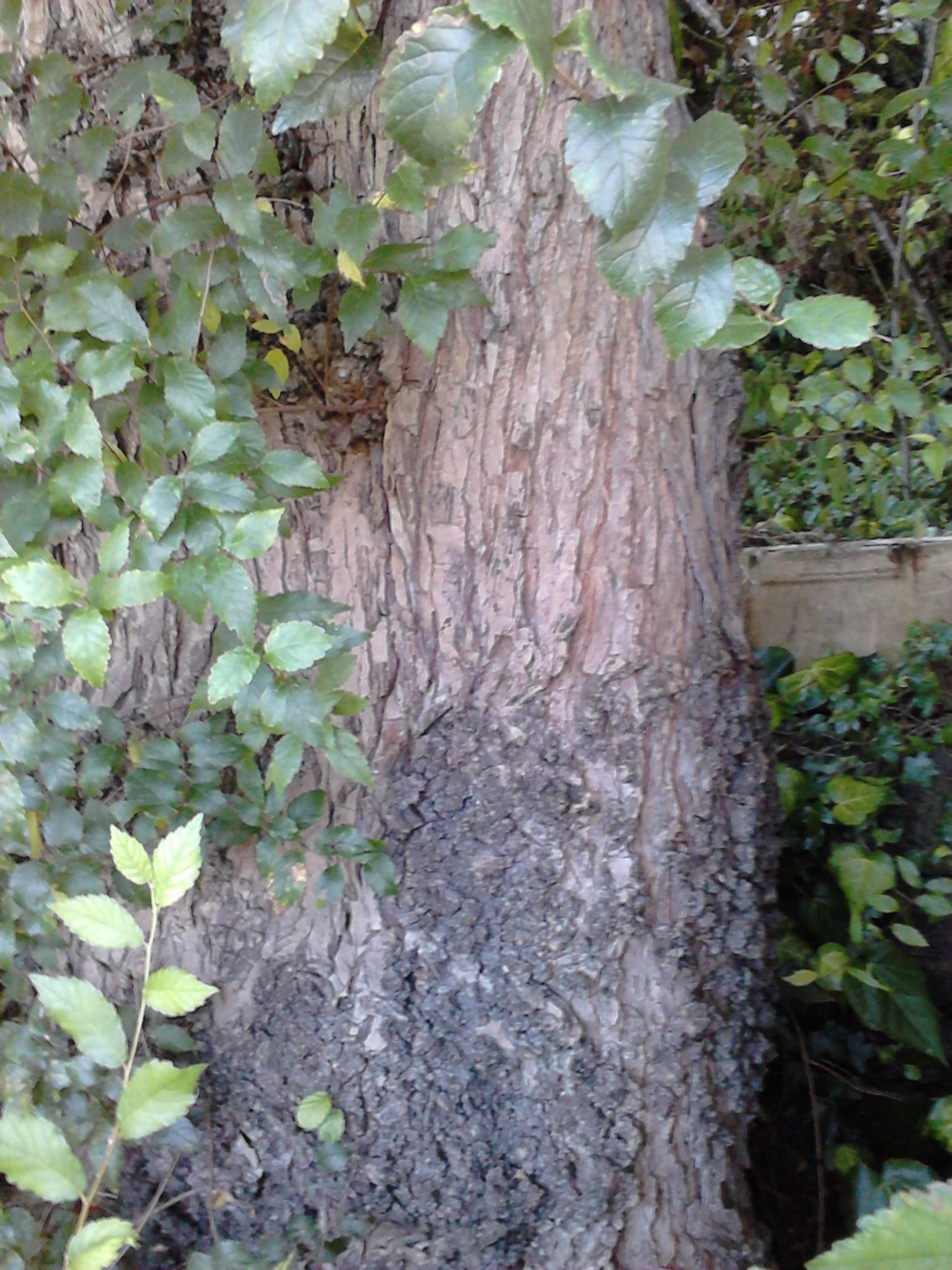
Graft-mark

== Notable trees ==
Three trees supplied by Späth to the Royal Botanic Garden Edinburgh (RBGE) in 1902 as U. campestris umbraculifera gracilis survive in Edinburgh (2019). The two oldest, planted in the Garden itself (one of which is base-grafted), were long known by an updated version of Melville's name for them, U. plotii × U. carpinifolia (:U. minor 'Plotii' × U. minor). It is known that Melville renamed some of Späth's trees at RBGE in 1958. These two were, according to one RBGE herbarium sheet, formerly called U. campestris umbraculifera, the name of the parent tree (not present in RBGE) of 'Umbraculifera Gracilis'. A herbarium specimen from Amsterdam labelled U. carpinifolia Gled. f. 'Gracilis' var. (Späth) Rehd. matches the Edinburgh trees. Taken together, the evidence suggested that the three Edinburgh trees (the third, with smaller bole-girth, is on Bruntsfield Links) were the clone Späth supplied as U. campestris 'Umbraculifera Gracilis', an identification confirmed in 2016 by RBGE. It is not known why Melville was permitted to disregard the trees' documented Central Asian provenance, and pronounce them hybrids of Plot Elm, a local variety of English field elm.

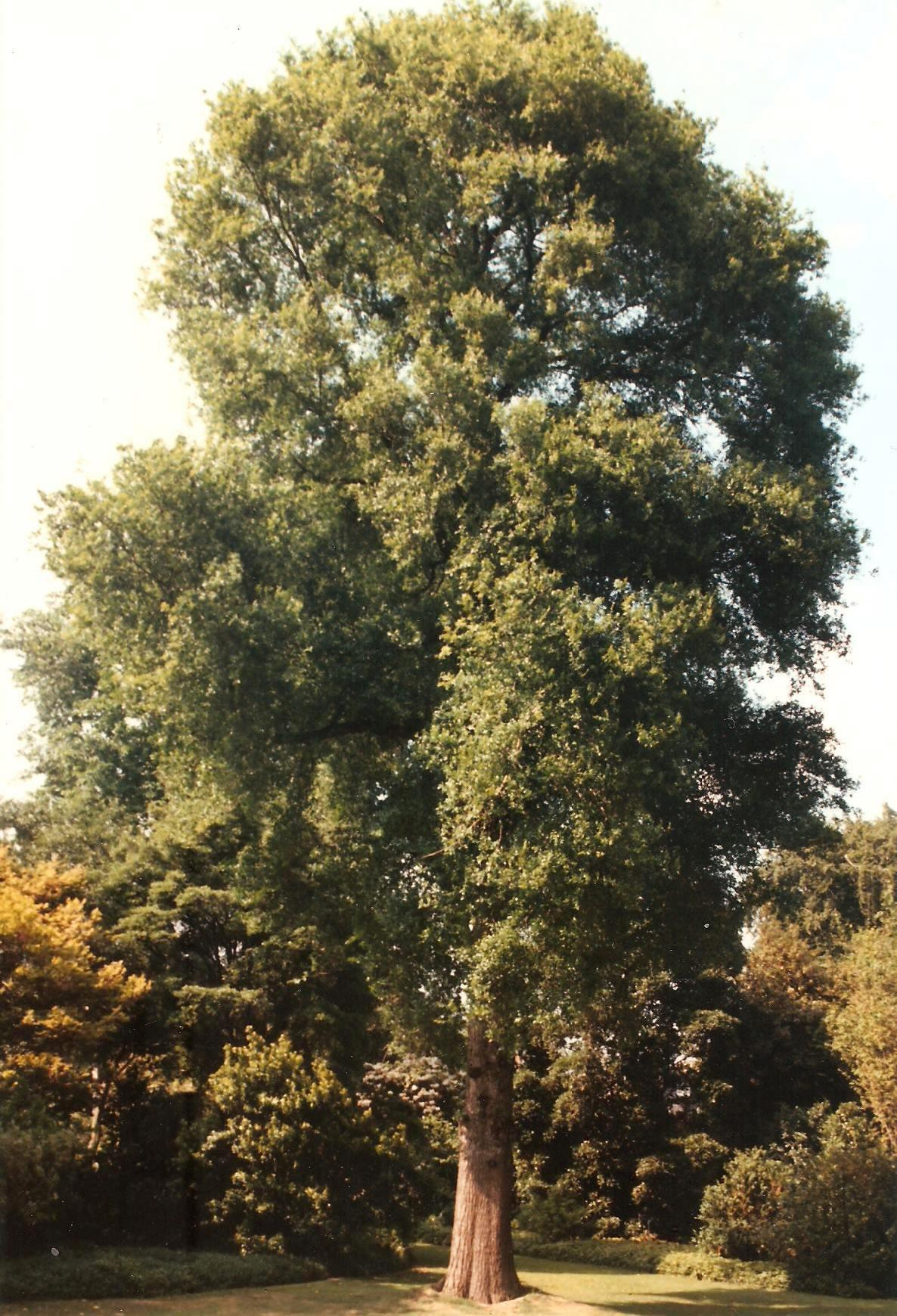
The second, ungrafted, RBGE 'Umbraculifera Gracilis' (1989)

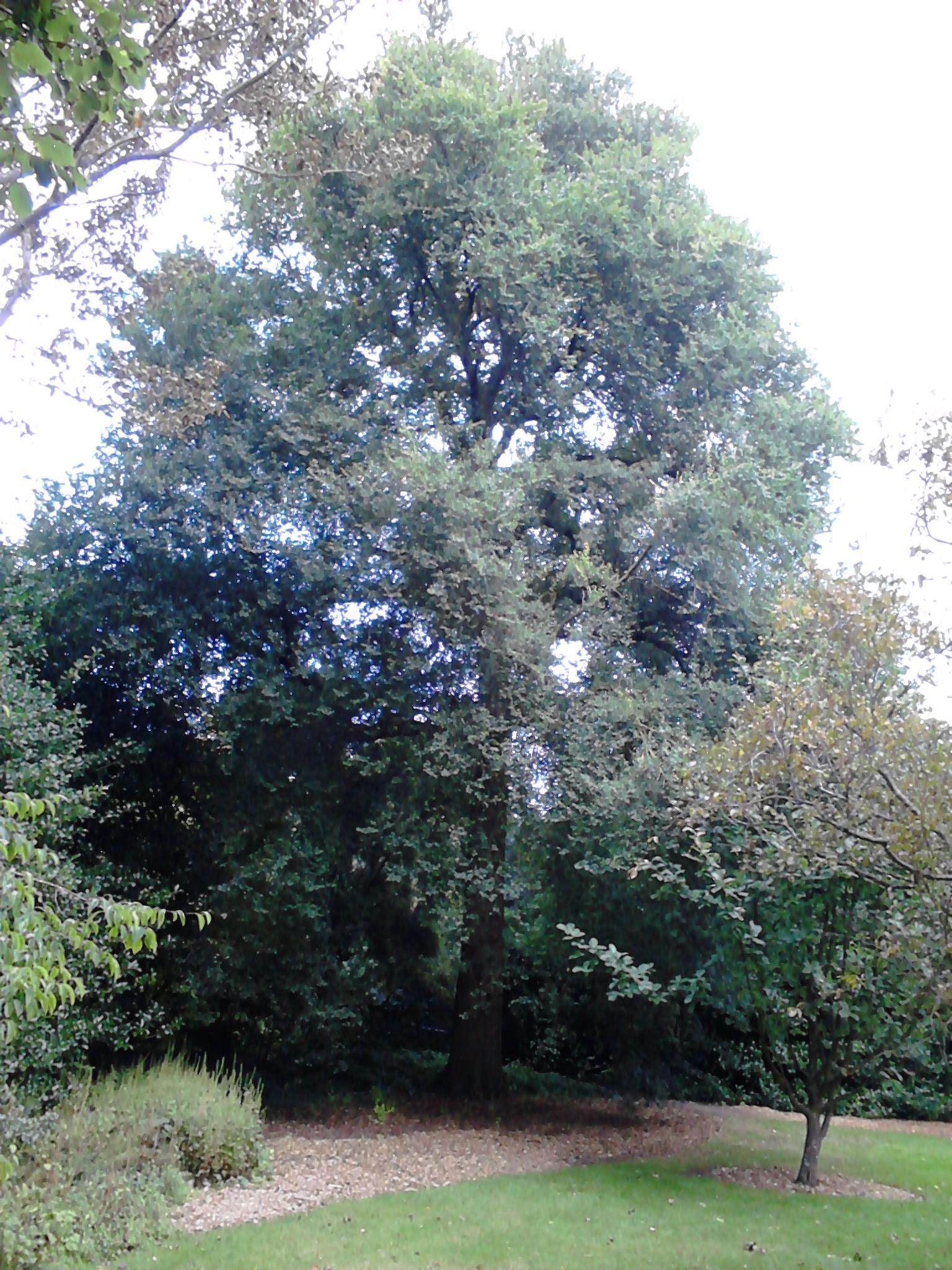
Same (October 2016)

== Synonymy ==
- Ulmus carpinifolia var. gracilis: Krüssmann , Handbuch der Laubgehölze 2: 534, 1962.
- Ulmus camp. umbraculifera nova

== Accessions ==
=== North America ===
- Holden Arboretum, US. Acc. no. 60-164

=== Europe ===
- Royal Botanic Garden Edinburgh, UK. Acc. nos. 19699358, 19699365

== Nurseries ==
=== Europe ===
- Centrum voor Botanische Verrijking vzw, Kampenhout, Belgium. ('Umbraculifera' listed separately to 'Umbraculifera Gracilis').
- Baumschulen Bauch GbR, Rheinbach, Germany.
