= Barnton, Edinburgh =

Suburb of Edinburgh, Scotland

Coordinates: 55°57′45.88″N 3°18′26.69″W

Barnton: Scottish Gaelic: Baile an t-Sabhail; Scots: Barntoun
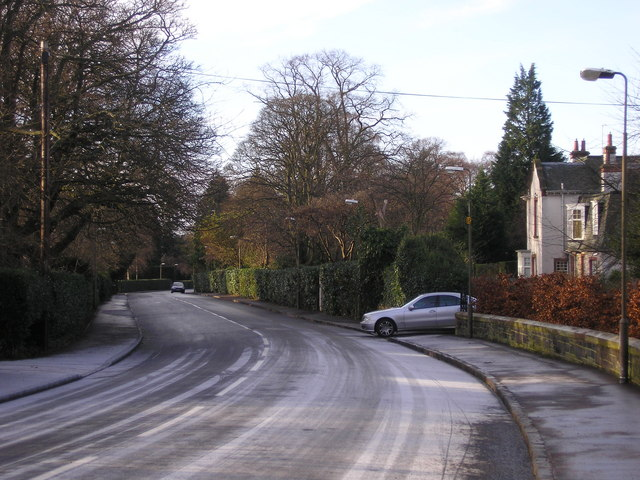
- Barnton Avenue

- Location within the City of Edinburgh council area Location within Scotland
- Council area: City of Edinburgh
- Country: Scotland
- Sovereign state: United Kingdom
- Postcode district: EH
- Dialling code: 0131
- Police: Scotland
- Fire: Scottish
- Ambulance: Scottish
- UK Parliament: Edinburgh West
- Scottish Parliament: Edinburgh Western

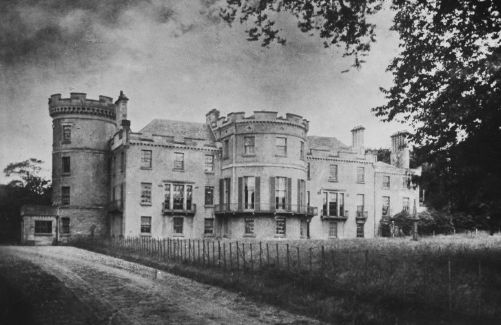
Barnton House c.1870

Barnton (Scottish Gaelic: Baile an t-Sabhail) is a suburb of Edinburgh, Scotland, situated about 7 kilometres (4.3 mi) north west of the city centre. Part of the area was traditionally known as Cramond Muir in reference to Cramond to the north.

Now a mainly residential district, the area is also home to two historic golf clubs and to a 12th century school which is one of the oldest in Scotland.

== Location ==
Barnton is not an administrative unit or electoral ward and therefore has no formal boundaries, but it is generally considered to be the area bounded by Cramond to the north and west, Strathalmond to the south west, East Craigs to the south and Davidson's Mains to the east.

Barnton shares a community council with Cramond and Cammo, and includes the Barnton Avenue Conservation Area.

== Notable buildings ==
It is home to the Royal High School of Edinburgh designed by Reid and Forbes in 1964. Braehead House, a complex house centred on a 15th-century remodelled Scottish tower house hides amongst modern housing. The Royal Burgess Golfing Society, one of the oldest golf societies in the world with a clubhouse dating from 1896. Cargilfield Preparatory School lies to the north.

The most notable landmark is the former Barnton Hotel at the junction of Whitehouse Road and Queensferry Road which dates from 1895 and was converted to flats in 2016.

The White House (which gives its name to Whitehouse Road) dates from 1615. It was extended and remodelled by MacGibbon and Ross in 1895.

The area centres on the paired streets of Barnton Avenue and West Barnton Avenue. These stand on the former estate of Barnton House (formerly Cramond Regis). All that remains is the ornate west gate pillars, designed by David Hamilton in 1810, on Whitehouse Road at the west end of West Barnton Avenue. Both halves of the avenue possess a series of large villas dating from the early 20th century. The west avenue in particular has several modern blocks of flats.

== Notable areas ==
Barnton Quarry, a former stone quarry in the area, is the (now derelict) site of an underground bunker which, in the event of nuclear war, would have served as the regional seat of government for Scotland from 1961 until its abandonment in 1985.

Barnton Park Lawn Tennis Club (Barnton Park LTC) is situated on Barnton Park.

Bruntsfield Links Golfing Society (1761) golf course is situated off Barnton Avenue at Davidson's Mains.

The Royal Burgess Golfing Society (1735), the oldest golfing society in the world, is within the boundaries on Whitehouse Road.

The boundaries follow local large roads particularly along Queensferry road until the Barnton Hotel. The north/west boundary follows Whitehouse until the t-junction at Gameskeeper's road. The north-east boundary follows Gameskeeper road and Cramond Road South until it meets Queensferry road in Davidson's Mains.

There are two schools within the boundaries. The Royal High School, a state comprehensive secondary school, and Cargilfield Preparatory School, an independent preparatory school.

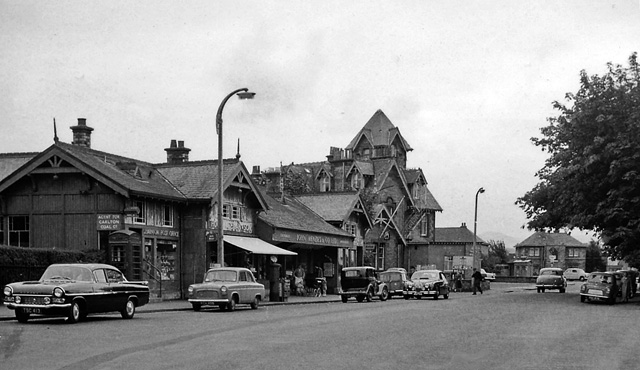
Until 1951 there was a station (seen here in 1962) originally opened by the Caledonian Railway

== Notable residents ==
- Robert Barton of Over Barnton
- Alexander Carmichael, compiler of Carmina Gadelica
- Col John James McIntosh Shaw, military surgeon and pioneer of plastic surgery
- Thea Musgrave, composer, was born in Barnton
- J. K. Rowling
- Robert Blyth Greig lived on Barnton Avenue West
- William Ramsay (MP)
- Tom Farmer
