= John James McIntosh Shaw =

- Born: 1885; Port Glasgow
- Died: 10 September 1940 (aged 54–55)
- Occupation: Military surgeon
- Known for: Pioneering plastic surgery in the 1920s
- Spouse: Mina Draper Shaw

Colonel John James McIntosh Shaw MC FRSE (1885 – 10 September 1940) was a Scottish 20th-century military surgeon who served in both World Wars, and pioneered plastic surgery in the 1920s.

== Early life and education ==
Shaw was born in Port Glasgow in 1885 the son of Isabella McIntosh (1844–1937) and her husband, John Shaw (1838–1896), a consulting engineer. His family moved to 6 Jessfield Terrace in Newhaven, Edinburgh when he was young. He was educated at George Watson's College.

In 1902 he entered the University of Edinburgh studying for general degree, graduating with an MA in 1906. He then continued at the University, studying medicine, graduating with a MB ChB in 1909. After practical experience he gained his doctorate (MD) in 1913.

== Career ==
In the World War I he served as a Major in the Royal Army Medical Corps attached to the Royal Artillery. He won the Military Cross, Croix de Guerre with star and was twice mentioned in dispatches.

After the war (and as a consequence of his experience) he began to specialise in plastic surgery, initially focussing on war-wounded. He was also one of the several to practice x-ray therapy on malignant diseases. He also lectured in Clinical Surgery at the University of Edinburgh.

In 1926 he was elected a member of the Harveian Society of Edinburgh. In 1931 he was elected a Fellow of the Royal Society of Edinburgh. His proposers were James Lorrain Smith, Sir David Wilkie, George Barger and Francis Gibson Baily.

In the World War II he was Consultant Surgeon in the Field to the British Army for the Middle East. He died of acute dysentery in Cairo on 10 September 1940. He is buried in the Cairo War Memorial Cemetery – grave P253.

== Family ==
He was married to Mina Draper Shaw (b.1899). They lived in Barnton, Edinburgh. They had four children.

== Publications ==
- Note on Two Gunshot Wounds (1918)
- War Injuries to Face and Jaw
