= Bruntsfield Links =

Parkland in Edinburgh, Scotland

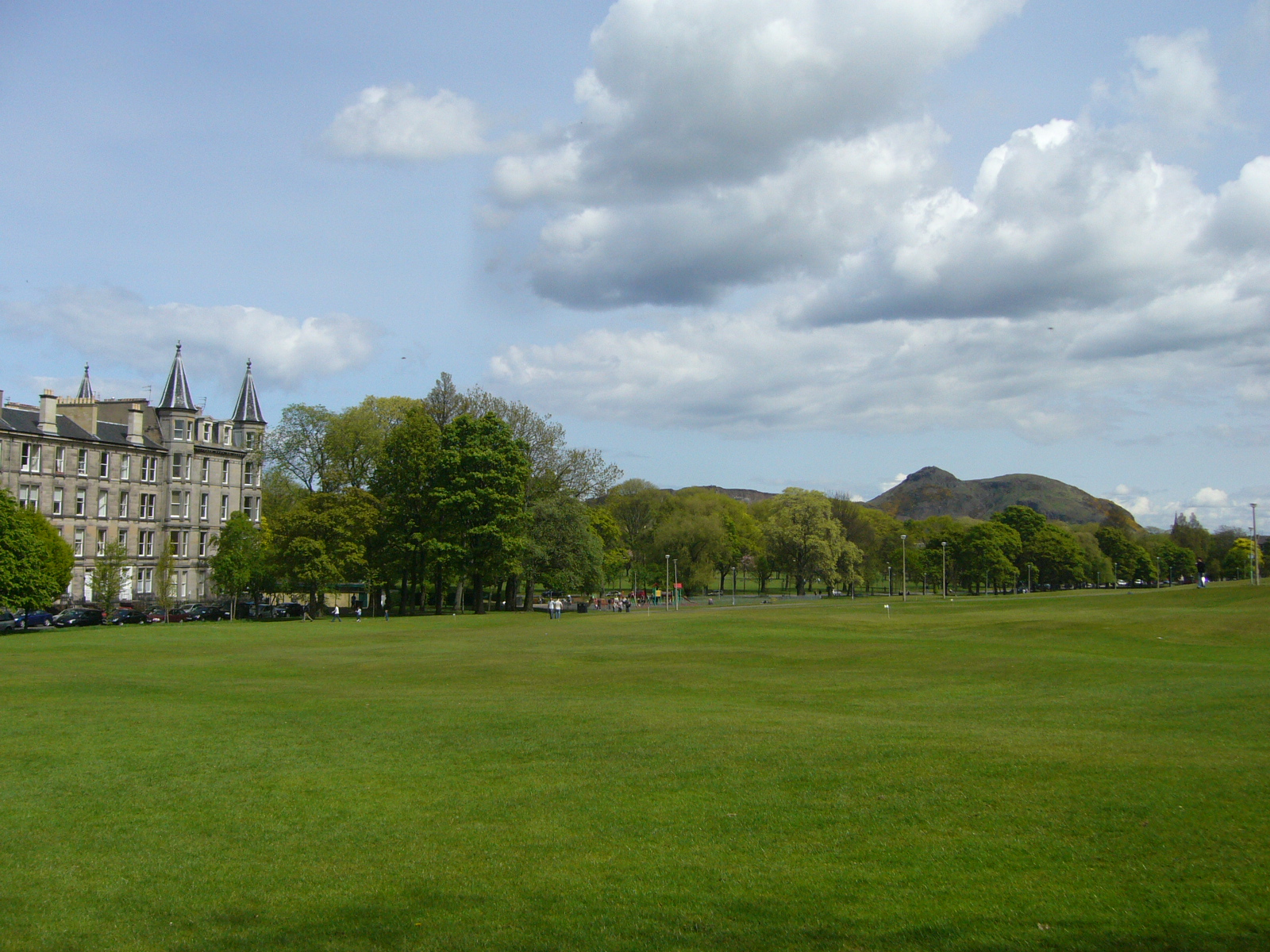
- Interactive map of Bruntsfield Links
- Type: Public park and golf course
- Location: Bruntsfield, Edinburgh, Scotland
- Coordinates: 55.9395°N 3.2023°W
- Operator: City of Edinburgh Council

Bruntsfield Links is 35 acres (14 ha) of open parkland in Bruntsfield, Edinburgh, immediately to the south-west of the adjoining Meadows.

Unlike The Meadows, which formerly contained a loch drained by the end of the 18th century, Bruntsfield Links has always been dry ground. It is the last vestige of the Burgh Muir, former woodland which stretched southwards to the Jordan Burn at the foot of the slope now covered by the built-up areas of the Grange and Morningside. The woodland was cleared in accordance with a decree of James IV in 1508, much of the wood being used to build timber-fronted houses and forestairs in the Lawnmarket and West Bow area of the Old Town.

== Golf on the Links ==
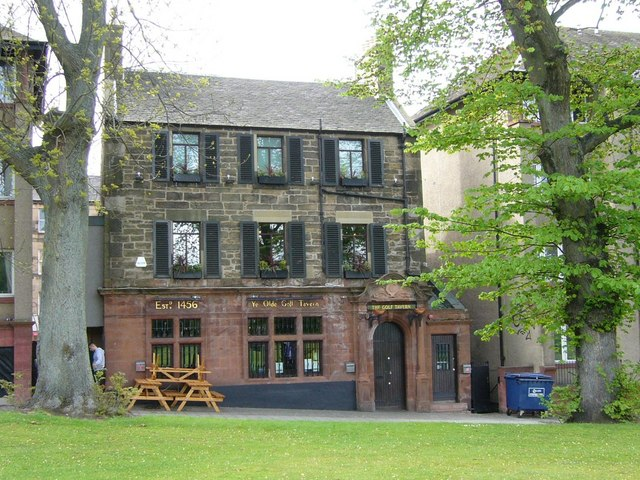
The Golf Tavern

"Links" is a Scots word for land associated with the game of golf. Originally meaning open sandy ground "usually covered with turf, bent grass or gorse, normally near the sea-shore", as at Leith Links or Lundin Links, the word came to mean any ground on which golf was played and is now often used for modern golf courses.

A City of Edinburgh Council plaque states that Bruntsfield Links are one of the earliest known locations where the game was played in Scotland, but it is unclear precisely when. The Golf Tavern which stands on the west side of the Links claims to have been established in 1456, although there is no evidence for this other than an unsupported statement made in A history of the Edinburgh Burgess Golfing Society, now known as The Royal Burgess Golfing Society.

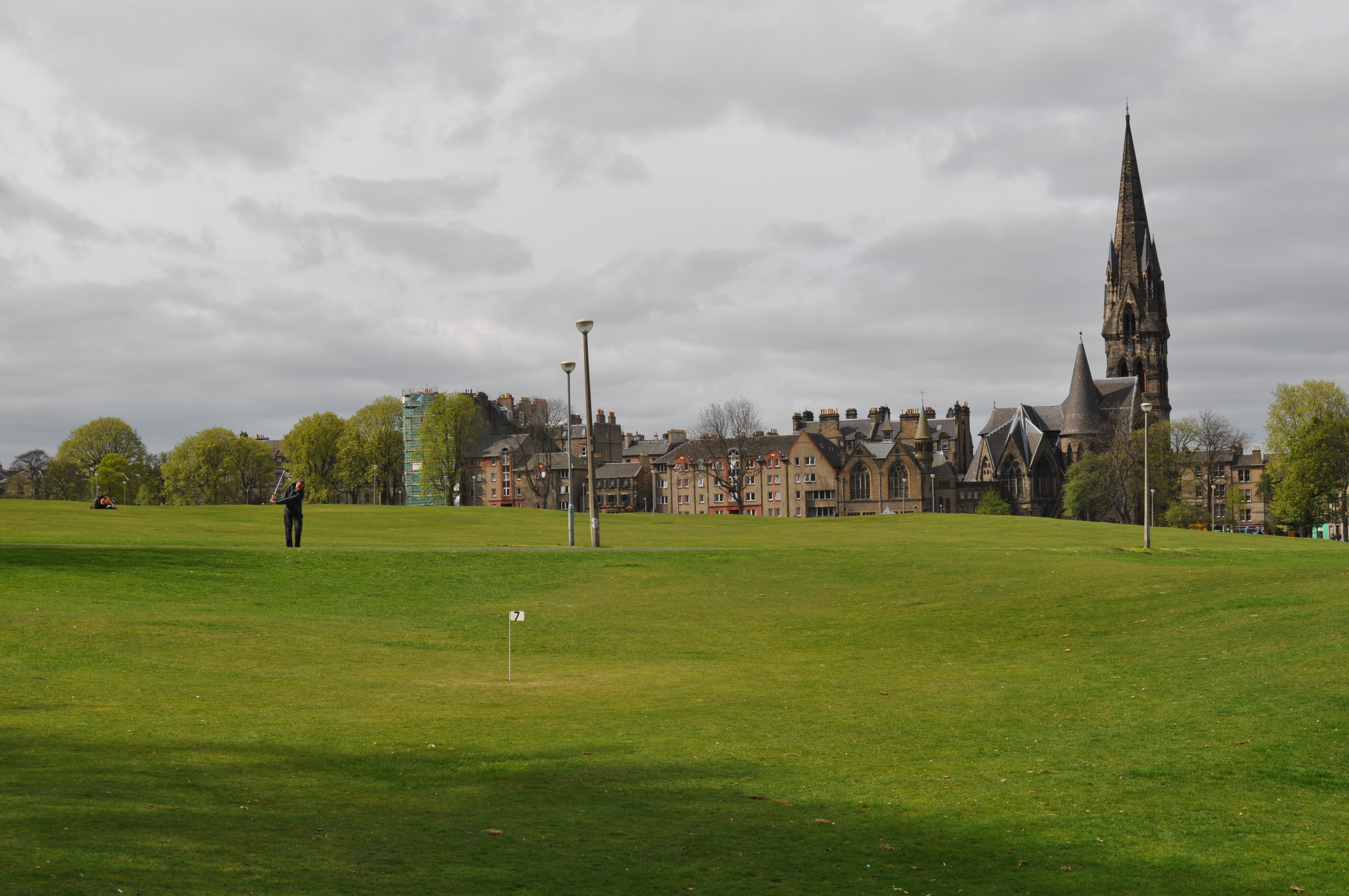
Golf is still played on the Links in the form of a 36-hole Short Hole Golf Course

After James IV's Charter of 1508 allowed the Town Council to feu portions of the Burgh Muir quarriers began extracting sandstone from the Links. By an Act of Council dated 25 December 1695 lessees were granted the liberty of choosing "an aiker" on any part of the Links for a quarry, "the said aiker always being at ane distance from the place where the neighbours play at Goulf". Robert Chambers mentions golf being played on the Links at the time of a well-known local incident which he implies took place in the reign of Charles II, although the internal evidence points more to the later "Killing Time" of the 1680s. This would make it contemporaneous with the famous game of golf played by the Duke of York and John Patersone on Leith Links in 1682 (see Timeline of golf).

By the middle of the 18th century, the area to the west of Bruntsfield House was regarded as the "city quarry", from which, for example, stones were taken in 1740 to build the city's Charity Workhouse at Bristo. A history of the area relates how, "The vacant intervals [between the quarry holes] then became utilised by the citizens in pursuit of the popular game of golf, the quarries with their mounds of debris acting in place of the usual bunkers." When the Warrender family of Bruntsfield applied to acquire ground between the nearby quarry and their property the Council approved, deciding that "the giving of the feu of the same could in no degree be hurtful to the Exercise and Diversion of the Golff". In 1752, however, an anonymous pamphlet warned against further encroachments, arguing that this would harm the wellbeing of residents in the town and provide less access for recreation for the infirm:

[...] the greatest Part of the Sheep Pasture will be cut off, and the Inhabitants deprived of Ew Whey [a by-product of cheese-making from ewe's milk], which is often prescribed and contributes much to their Health, and is easily got, because of the Nearness of the Town; and Tender People will be deprived of these Walks and retired Places which the playing at Golf hath rendered absolutely necessary, and the only places to retire to when the Golfing Green is full of Golfers.

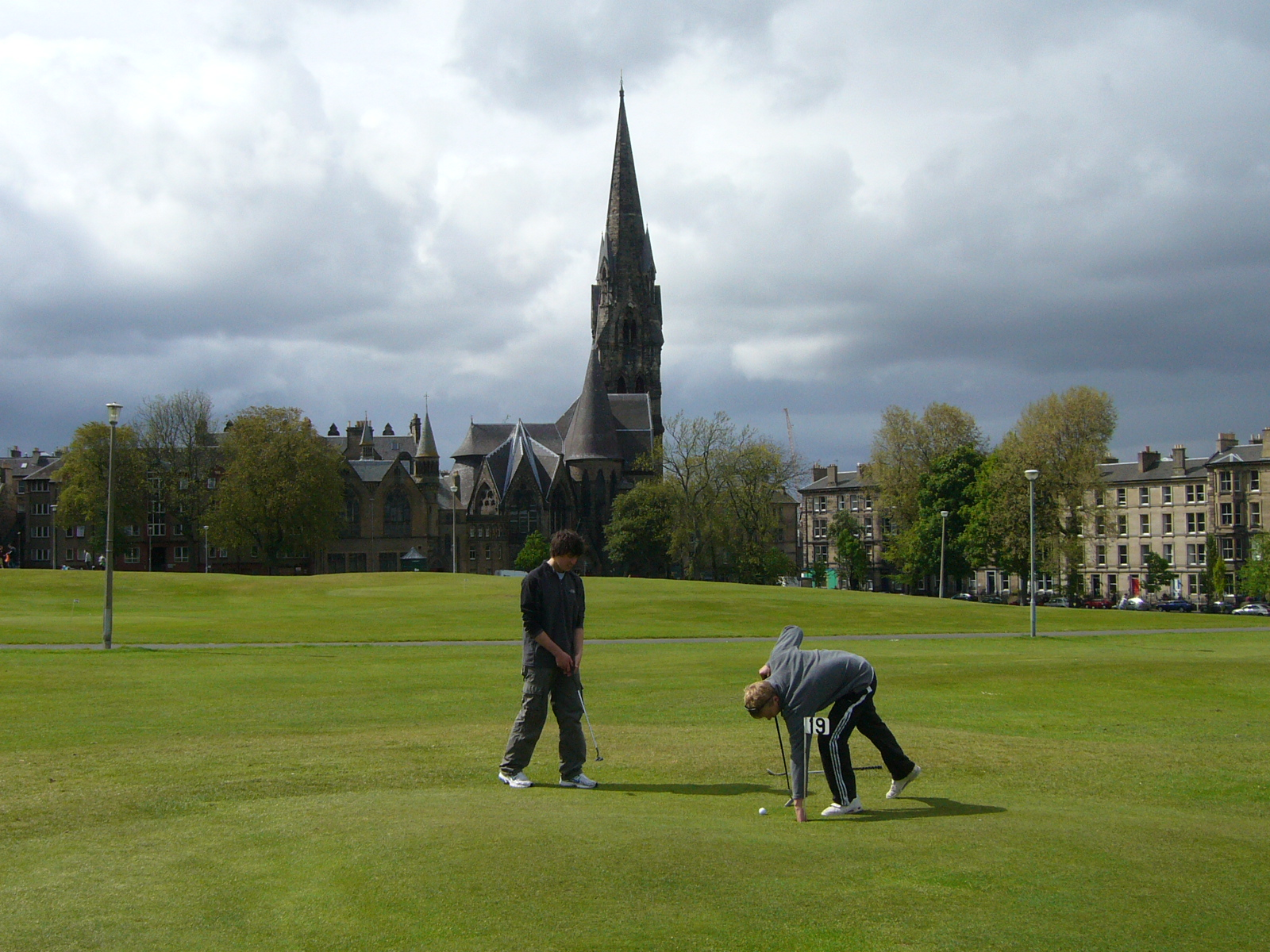
Young golfers at the 19th hole with the Barclay Church adjoining Wright's Houses behind

The pursuit of golf was a major factor in preserving the Links as an open space. In 1791, it was proposed to drive a straight road across them (to link present-day Home Street to the crest of the hill at present-day Church Hill), thus bypassing the little village of Wrightshouses (roughly on the site of present-day Leven Street). The proposers argued that the existing road constituted "the worst and most inconvenient of all the entries into Edinburgh...which must always be the case while it is carried through so narrow and a dirty a village inhabited by so many low people". The proposal was, however, successfully blocked by the Burgess Golfing Society which used the Links and the road re-routed to circumvent them. This resulted in the demolition of houses on the west side of the village, but spared those on the east side, where a terrace retains the name in the form "Wright's Houses". A request made to the council by Walter Scott in 1798 (before his fame as a novelist), that the volunteer cavalry regiment of which he was quartermaster should be allowed to train on the Links, based on the traditional right to muster troops there, was rejected. The Council cited the position taken by the golfing societies as the reason.

The city currently boasts more than twenty-one golf courses, one of which is home to the Royal Burgess Golfing Society founded in 1735 and the Bruntsfield Links Golfing Society founded in 1761. These Societies moved from the Links to Musselburgh in 1874 and 1876 respectively, and then to a newly laid out course at Barnton on the north-western outskirts of the city in 1895 and 1898.

Golf is still played on the Links in the form of a 36-hole Short Hole Golf Course (established 1890), where Bruntsfield Short Hole Golf Club is the last remaining Club still playing over this unique course, thus continuing the historic golfing traditions on the Links.

== Recreation ==
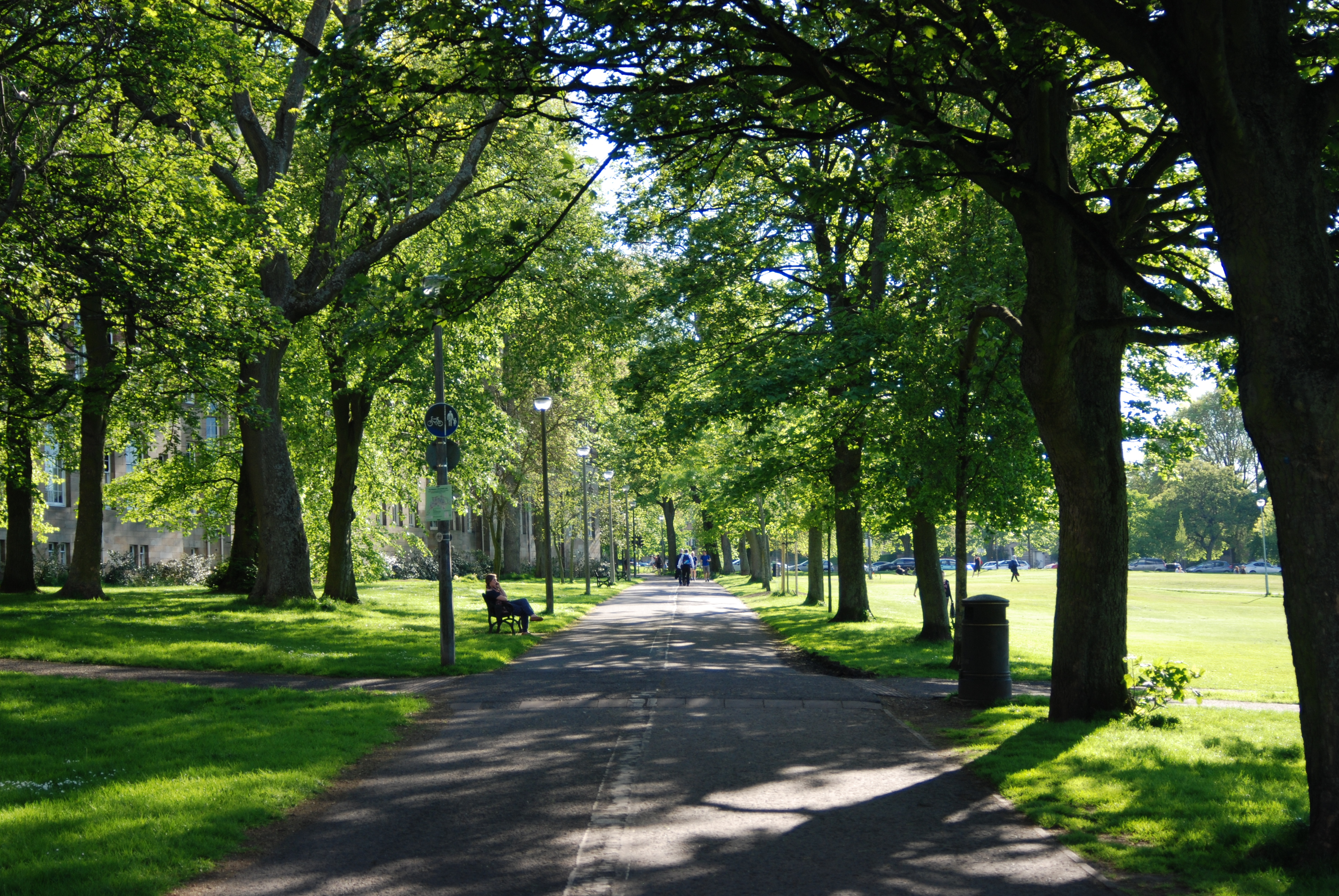
Path by Bruntsfield Links

The area is a favourite spot for dog-walkers and becomes an overspill area when crowds gather in the Meadows during warm Summer weather. The west section of the Links next to Whitehouse Loan, where a former school building (the original Boroughmuir School, later James Gillespie's School for Girls) has been converted to a University Hall of Residence, also attracts crowds in good weather. It is frequently used by historical re-enactment societies as a practice ground. A children's playpark and the lawn of the Edinburgh Croquet Club are situated close to the Barclay Viewforth Church. The raised ground in front of Warrender Park Terrace is a good vantage point for viewing Festival and New Year fireworks from the Castle, and during winter snowfalls the north-facing slope here becomes a popular sledging ground for children. A footpath and cycle lane connecting Bruntsfield to Middle Meadow Walk provide all those living in the area with a shortcut and quick route to the university buildings around George Square. There are also many local businesses, including the Edinburgh Bicycle Cooperative, which attract visitors. The Golf Tavern pub sits to the west of the links.

== Botanical ==
An early attempt to remove some of the trees from the Links was blocked in one of the first campaigns of the city's conservation body, the Cockburn Association. Over the years, however, Dutch elm disease has taken a gradual toll of trees in the area, with the most recent outbreak occurring in 2011. Among notable surviving elms (2019) are four old Exeter Elms in the southernmost corner (Bruntsfield Crescent), well-grown Huntingdon Elms at the start of Whitehouse Loan, and a rare Ulmus minor 'Umbraculifera Gracilis' in front of the Links Hotel in Alvanley Terrace. Diseased elms have been replaced by the disease-resistant hybrids Ulmus 'Regal' and Ulmus 'Columella'.

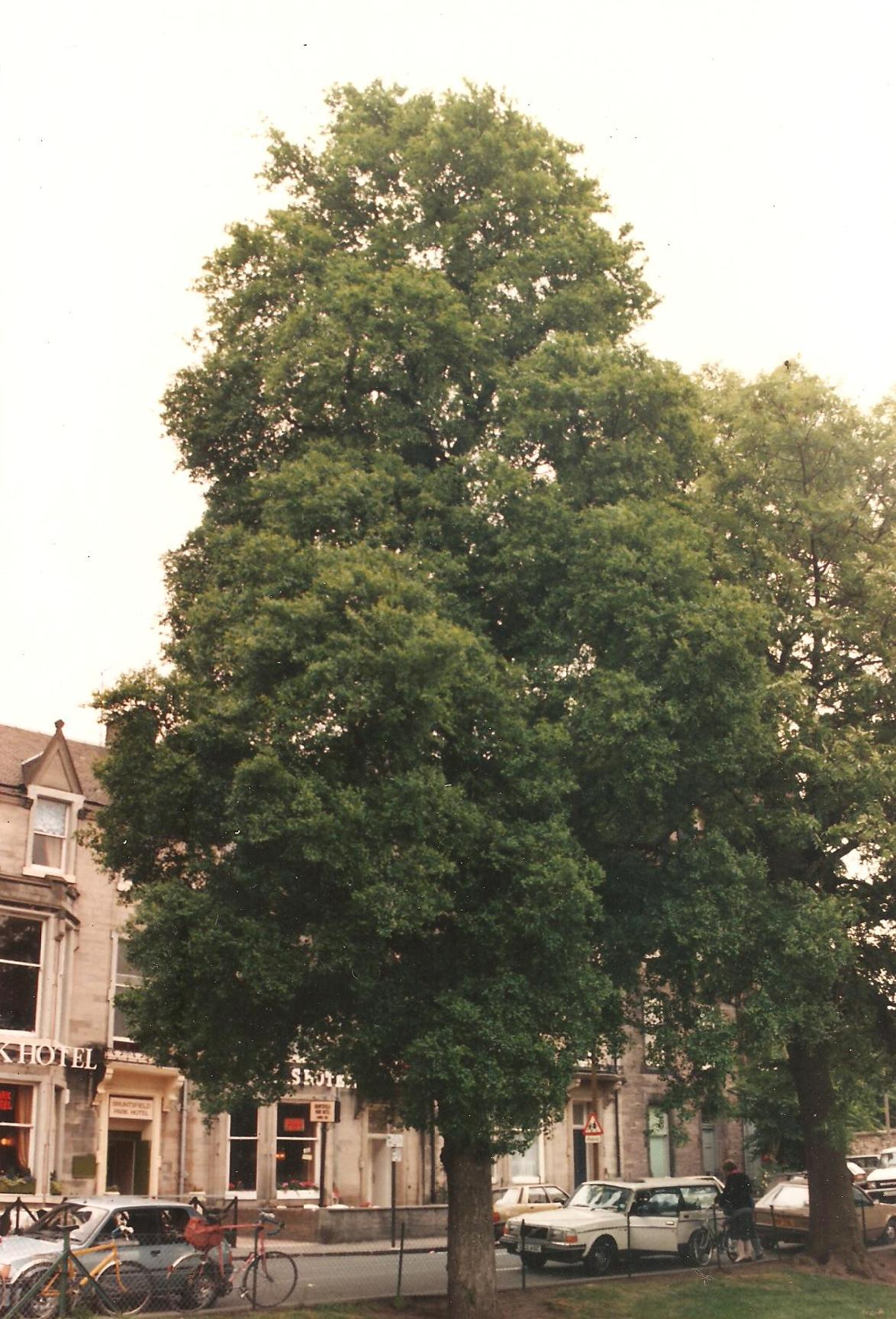
Ulmus minor 'Umbraculifera Gracilis', Bruntsfield Links, 1989

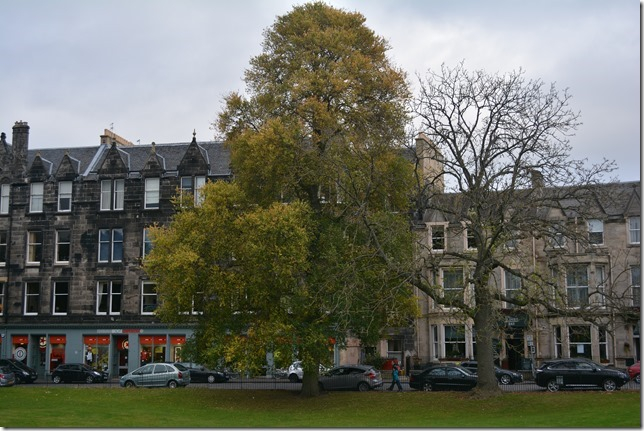
Ulmus minor 'Umbraculifera Gracilis', Bruntsfield Links, 2014

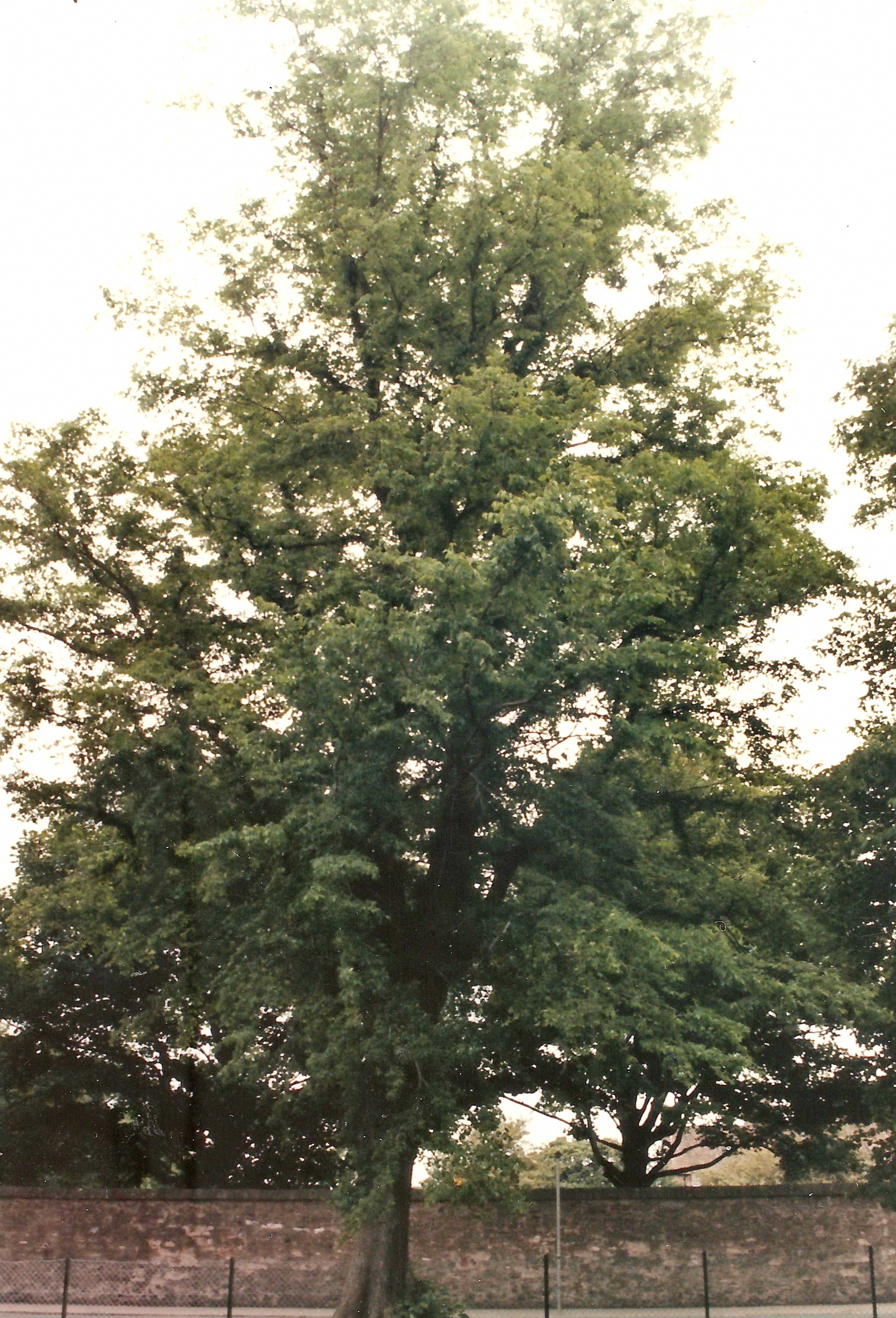
Grafted Ulmus × hollandica cultivar, Bruntsfield Links, 1989

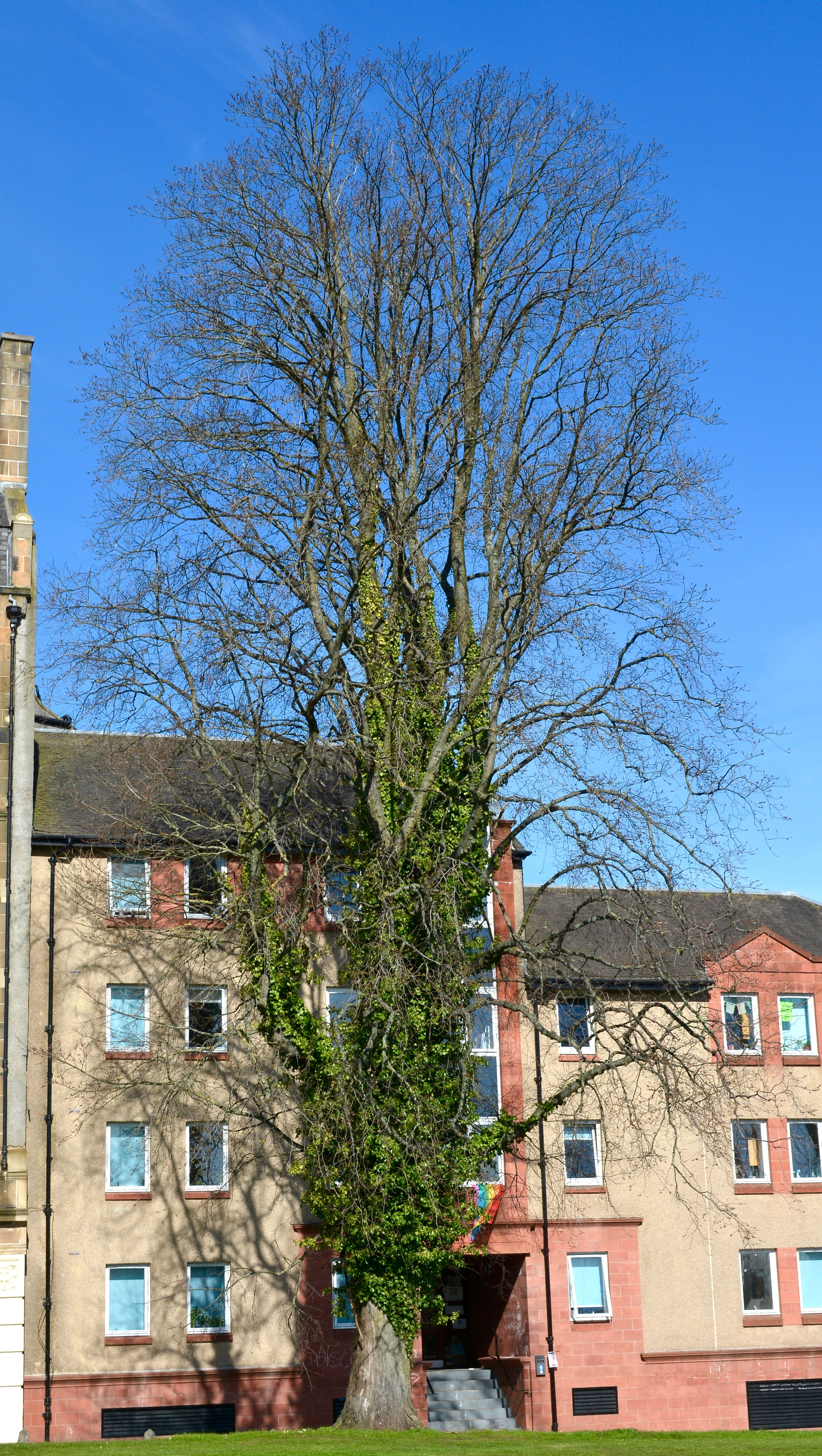
Fastigiate wych elm, Bruntsfield Links, 2016

== See also ==
- Thomas Kincaid
- Edinburgh
