= The Royal Burgess Golfing Society of Edinburgh =

Golf club in Edinburgh, Scotland

Coordinates: 55°57′44″N 3°18′21″W

Arms of the Society.

The Royal Burgess Golfing Society of Edinburgh is a Scottish golf club, which holds claim to be the oldest golfing society in the world, with references to it being instituted in 1735 dating from 1834. The club enjoys a parkland course located in Barnton, Edinburgh that was designed initially by Tom Morris and Willie Park Jnr, with subsequent revisions by James Braid. Notable members have included Jack Nicklaus and Bernard Gallacher alongside a host of royals, aristocrats and socialites.

== Name ==
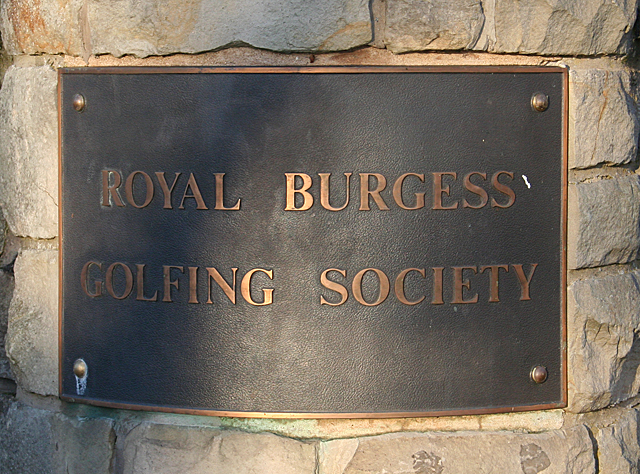
Name Plaque

The original name of the society is believed to have been "The Society of Golfers in and about Edinburgh", and later, "The Edinburgh Golfing Society". The original golfers played on the Bruntsfield Links in Edinburgh's Old Town.

The "Burgess" part of the name comes from the tendency of the earliest members to be Burgesses of the City of Edinburgh; however, being a Burgess is not (nor has ever been) a criterion for membership. A motion made in 1791 that would have decreed "no gentleman shall be admitted a member of the Club unless he first becomes a Burgess and a Freeman of Edinburgh" was in fact overwhelmingly rejected.

Although they became what one would now call a "golf club" in 1895 with the purchase of a course of their own at Barnton (as opposed to a golf society which one now understands to mean a club without a permanent course), they retain the name "golfing society".

The society has had its current 'Royal' status since 1929, when King George V ordered the name be changed from The Edinburgh Burgess Golfing Society to The Royal Burgess Golfing Society of Edinburgh.

== History ==
=== Origins ===
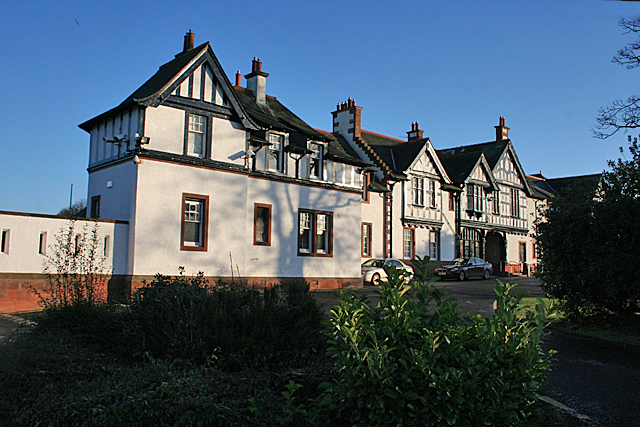
Royal Burgess Golfing Society Club House

The origins of the society are shrouded in a degree of mystery. It is speculated an informal society of "Burgess" golfers may have met at Bruntsfield Links in Edinburgh before the 1735 date stated as the origin of the society. The links had been cleared of oak forest and gifted to the city, probably starting with David I, for the prescriptive use of the people of Edinburgh. The game of golf is thought to date back much before this, and golf was understood to have been played on the Bruntsfield Links since at least the 17th century. The first extant minute of the society is dated from 8 April 1773, but it is first recorded as being established in 1735 in an 1834 edition of the Edinburgh Almanac. One proposed theory for the absence of early records is due to a probable foundational association with freemasonry, and the freemasons nature of secrecy. Indeed, the oldest freemasonic lodge in the world is believed to be in Edinburgh (the Lodge of Edinburgh (Mary's Chapel) No. 1), which stemmed off from an association formed by the Burgesses of the Edinburgh Incorporation of Masons and some early members of the Royal Burgess were recorded as operative masons. It has also been noted that the Royal Burgess Golfing Society still maintains some early traditions which may be 'masonic' in nature, such as the 'shaking in' of new members, where the Captain of the club can invite new members by shaking their hand (reminiscent of the Masonic handshake).

The early members were from a variety of professions, including Advocates, Writers to the Signet, bankers of the Royal Bank, Merchants, goldsmiths, architects and masons, booksellers, tanners and tailors, painters, and many other trades and professions.

On 2 July 1800 the Edinburgh Town Council granted to the Burgess Society a Seal of Cause. Obtaining the seal of cause was largely down to the efforts of William Ranken, His Majesty's Tailor for Scotland and convener of the Incorporated Trades. Upon the granting of the Seal of Cause, the Society became known as the Edinburgh Burgess Golfing Society.

In obtaining the seal of cause the Edinburgh Burgess Golfing Society forged a link to the Edinburgh Town Council, which at times saw the council hold power over the rules and regulations of the society, and every Lord Provost granted honorary membership. The council would often use the club house to entertain civic guests (especially foreign dignitaries).

Although originating at the Bruntsfield Links, the society moved most of its activity to Musselburgh Links in 1874, due to overcrowding. However, the same problem arose in the late 1800s, as golf started to become popular. It then moved to their current Barnton course in 1894. Royals have played at the Burgess and some have even become members, including George V, George VI, Edward VIII and, currently, The Duke of York.

== Uniform ==
In the early days of golf it was almost universal for golf clubs and societies to have a uniform (as had been the case for other similar sports of the era such as archery). The uniform of the Royal Burgess is first recorded as being instituted in 1790 as a "scarlet jacket, black neck and badge". No member could partake in competitions unless in full uniform.

In 1837 the uniform rules were updated to a "dress coat, colour dark claret, with black velvet collar, double breasted and lined in the skirts with white silk or satin, prominent buttons on cuffs of coat and also on the flaps, dress vest colour primrose with smaller buttons to correspond with those on the coat".

Though the golfers are no longer expected to play at competitions in the uniform, a version of it is still worn by members during the annual dinner and other formal events.

== Course Detail ==
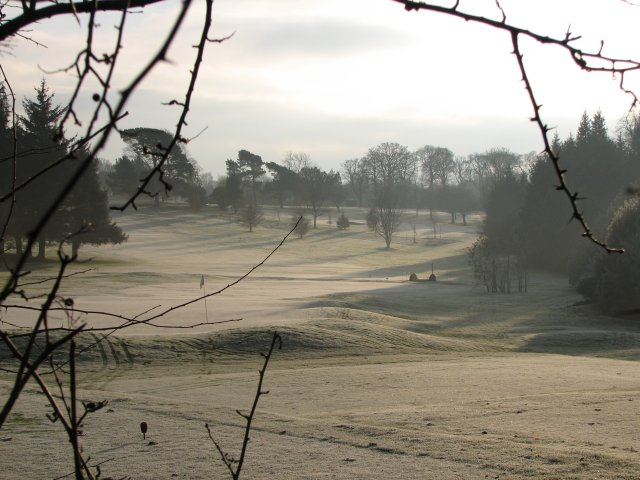
The course at Barnton

Hole	Yards (red tees)	Par (red tees)	Yards (white tees)	Par (white tees)
1	392	4	378	4
2	347	4	300	4
3	420	4	411	4
4	465	4	446	4
5	174	3	145	3
6	483	5	471	4
7	442	4	418	4
8	166	3	141	3
9	418	4	390	4
Out	3307	35	3100	34
10	375	4	359	4
11	354	4	349	4
12	312	4	299	4
13	198	3	181	3
14	384	4	371	4
15	414	4	384	4
16	502	5	466	4
17	441	4	417	4
18	244	4	232	3
In	3224	36	3058	35
Total	6531	71	6158	70

== See also ==
- List of golf clubs granted Royal status
