= Thomas Kincaid =

Edinburgh medical student, diarist, golfer and archer

Thomas Kincaid (1661–1726), also described as Thomas Kincaid the Younger, was an Edinburgh medical student and keen golfer and archer, whose student diary includes the earliest known instructions for playing golf.

== Early life and diary ==
Kincaid's father was an Edinburgh surgeon, Thomas Kincaid (1619–1691), who was a freeman of the Incorporation of Surgeons of Edinburgh, in Scotland, and became its Deacon (president) in 1652. During 45 years as a surgeon-apothecary, he built up a considerable library.

His son Thomas Kincaid apparently intended to follow a similar career in medicine and studied medical textbooks by Thomas Willis, Thomas Sydenham and Nicholas Culpeper, as well as learning the Dutch language with the implication that he probably intended going to Leiden University for a medical degree. From January 1687 to December 1688, the younger Kincaid kept a detailed diary, recording his studies as well as "today I thought upon" entries giving his thoughts on a wide range of subjects ranging from chemistry and theology to horse breeding, building a meeting house, and making a blacksmith's vice. He described the best way to stand when throwing stones, and techniques for archery, billiards, and golf.

He noted discussions on medicine with his father, visits to his married sisters, and correspondence with his brother James, who was in Holland. On a visit to Holyrood Abbey, he saw "the pictures"; portraits of Scottish monarchs. Kincaid also visited the physic garden and Surgeons Yard. His diary entry for 6 November 1688 records "the Prince of Orange landed this day", the arrival of William of Orange that brought the Glorious Revolution.

== Golf ==
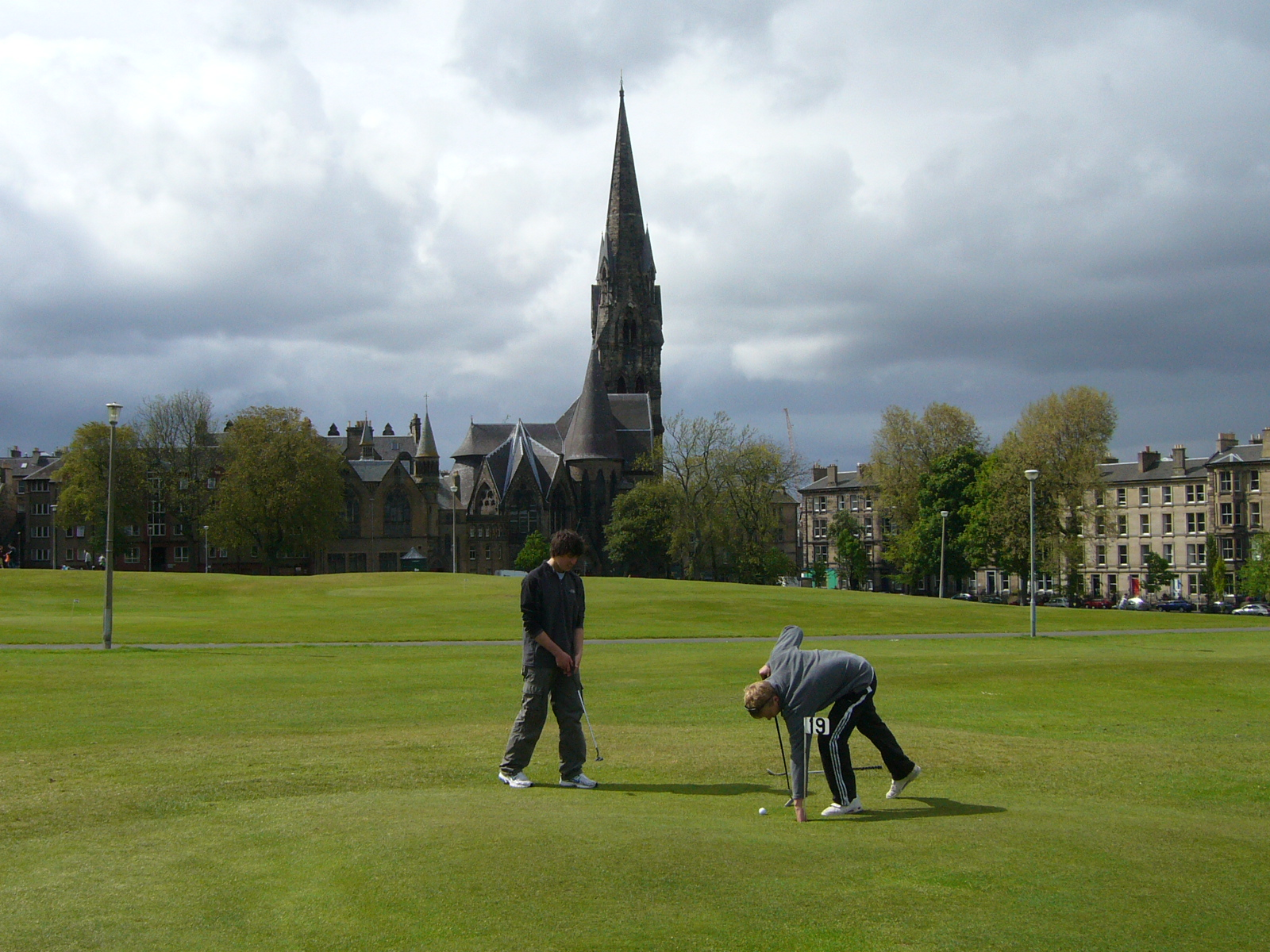
Bruntsfield Links in 2009

In January and February 1687, Kincaid wrote down in his diary his detailed thoughts on golf, which he played at Bruntsfield Links, near the Tounis College, and at Leith Links. His entry for 20 January 1687 noted how he read Chirurgia in the morning, then "After dinner I went out to the Golve". He described his Golf stroke:

I found that the only way of playing at the Golve is to stand as you do at fenceing with the small sword bending your legs a little and holding the muscles of your legs and back and armes exceeding bent or fixt or stiffe and not at all slackning them in the time you are bringing down the stroak (which you readily doe) ....

He continued on for 13 paragraphs of similar detailed analysis of how to get the best results. On the next day he considered the need for "hitting the ball exactly", not too hard as "the only reason why men readily miss the ball when they strick with more strenth than ordinaire is because incressing their strength in the stroke makes them alter the ordinaire position of their body and ordinaire way of bringing about the club." (spellings as original). Over the two months he kept returning to the theme, writing down his recommendations on techniques including some advice which still remains relevant to modern golfers. He also set out his views on the ideal golf ball which "must be of thick and hard leather not with pores or grains or that will let a pin usually pass through it the specially at the soft end", and on an early handicap system.

== Later life ==
The Incorporation of Surgeons of Edinburgh (later renamed the Royal College of Surgeons of Edinburgh) did not record Kincaid as having passed its entrance examination, and he does not appear to have qualified as a surgeon. In 1709 he donated to the Incorporation his deceased father's extensive library, and the Fellows list records that in 1710 Thomas Kincaid was admitted to the Incorporation "In regard of good deeds done by him ... without payment of any upsett money." This was one of the earliest instances of admission to the Incorporation without an entrance fee.

Kincaid was an active member of the Edinburgh Company of Archers, and in 1711 became the third winner of the City of Edinburgh Silver Arrow, which still continues today as the longest-running annual archery competition.

He is buried with his parents in Greyfriars Kirkyard in Edinburgh.
