= Golf society =

Scottish golfing social club

A golf society, or golfing society, is a social club, whose members are dedicated to playing the sport of golf. Unlike a golf club, a golf society does not own a golf course, instead playing on the golf courses owned by one or more golf clubs. Golf societies may form for a number of reasons, including to provide opportunities for members to play more than one course, or to avoid the associated overheads of managing a golf course.

== History ==
Golf societies arguably pre-date the course owning golf clubs, for in the early days of golf in Scotland it was played on common land such as at Bruntsfield, Leith and Musselburgh Links, where the societies that played golf upon the land had no prescriptive right to do so. Such prescriptive rights would not be introduced until the 17th century.

The Royal Burgess Golfing Society of Edinburgh makes claim to be the oldest golf society in the world. They originally met at "various hostelries", before settling on the Golfers Tavern on the Bruntsfield links in Edinburgh. As time went by they found themselves playing more frequently at Musselburgh Links. By 1895 they had become a more traditional golf club, purchasing a course of their own at Barton where they continue to play to this day.

Other golf societies have since cropped up in Scotland, and across the rest of the world.
