= James Gowans (architect) =

British architect (1821–1890)

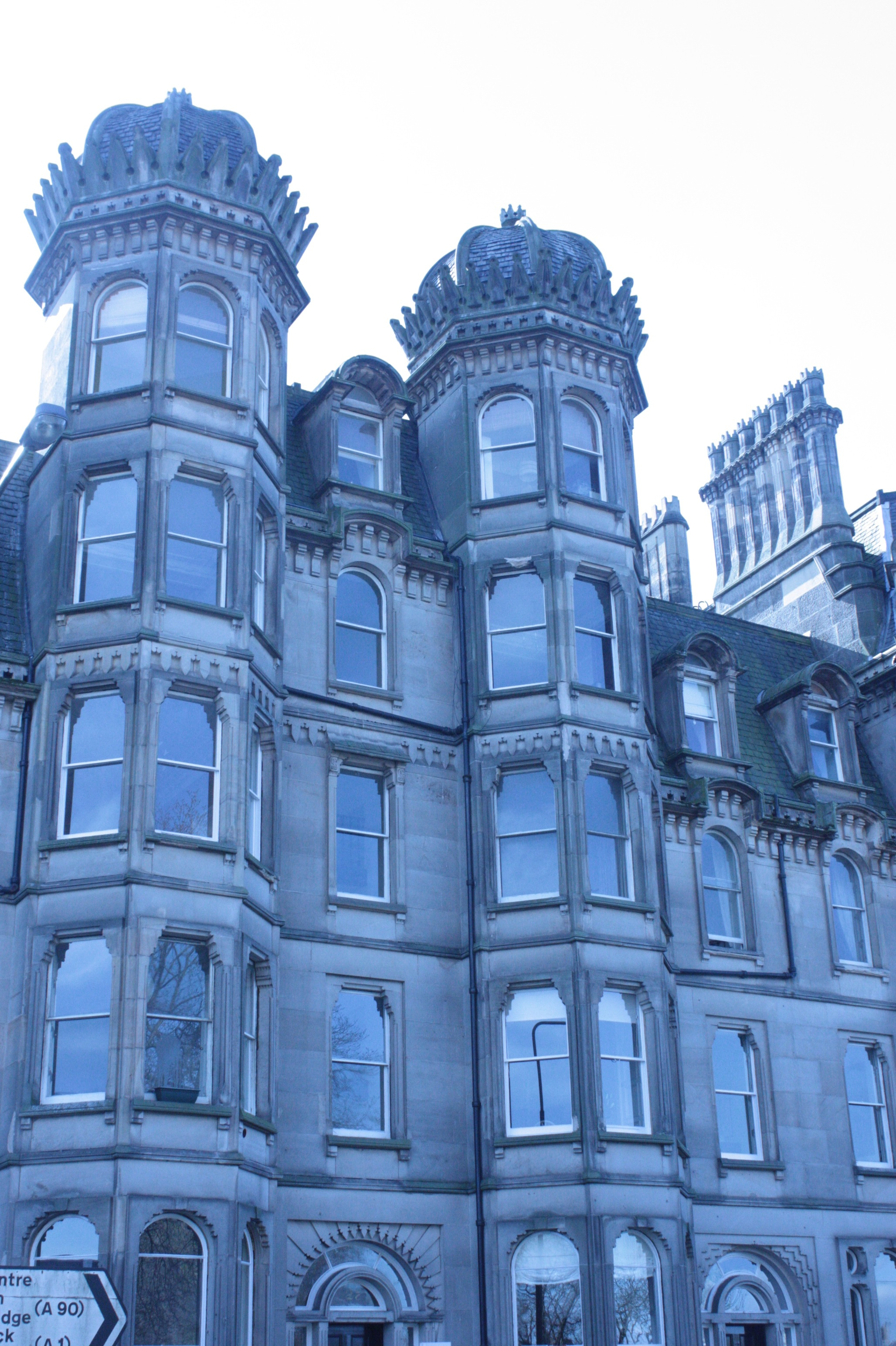
James Gowans' tenement on Castle Terrace Edinburgh

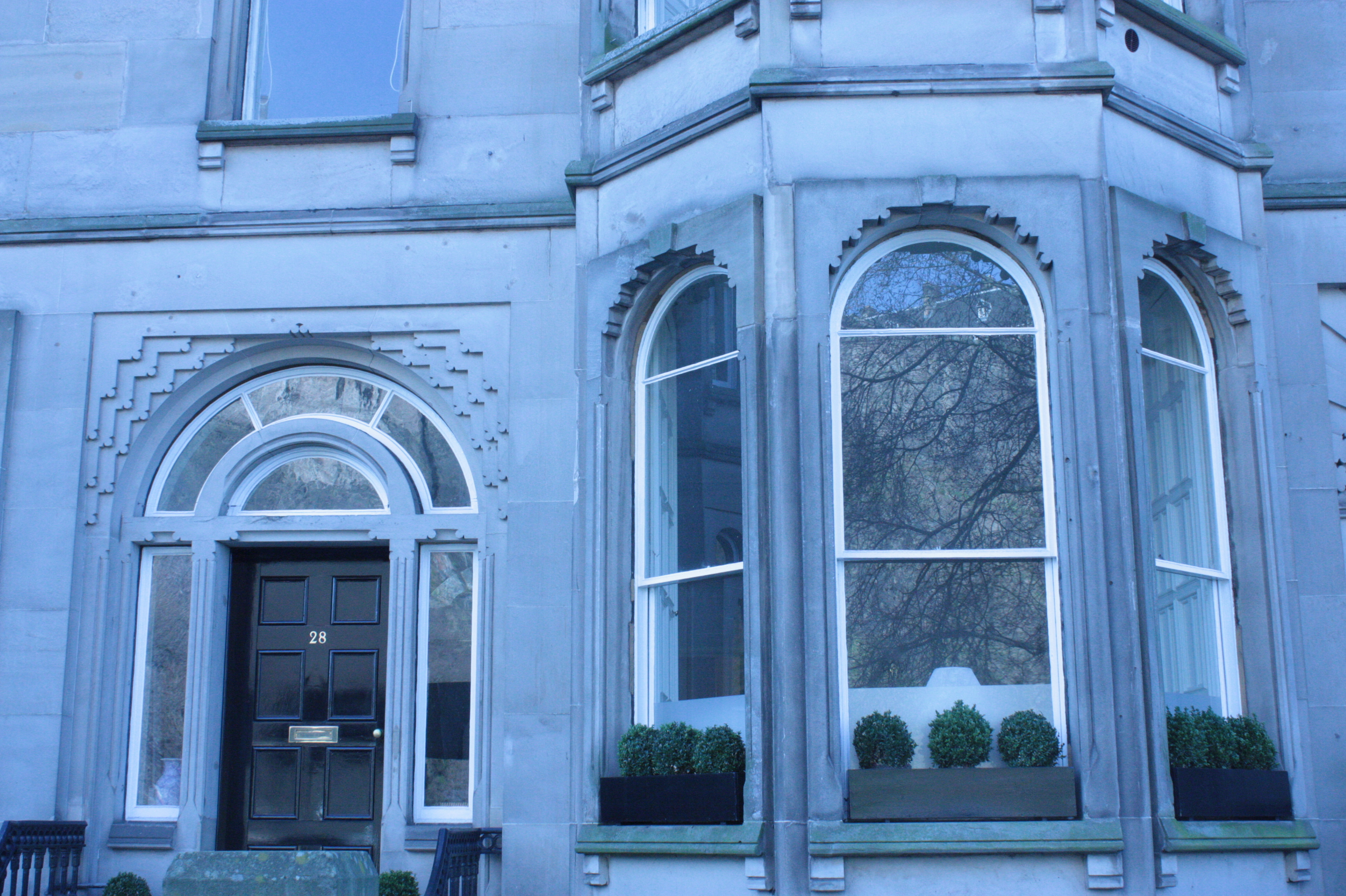
James Gowans' window and door detail

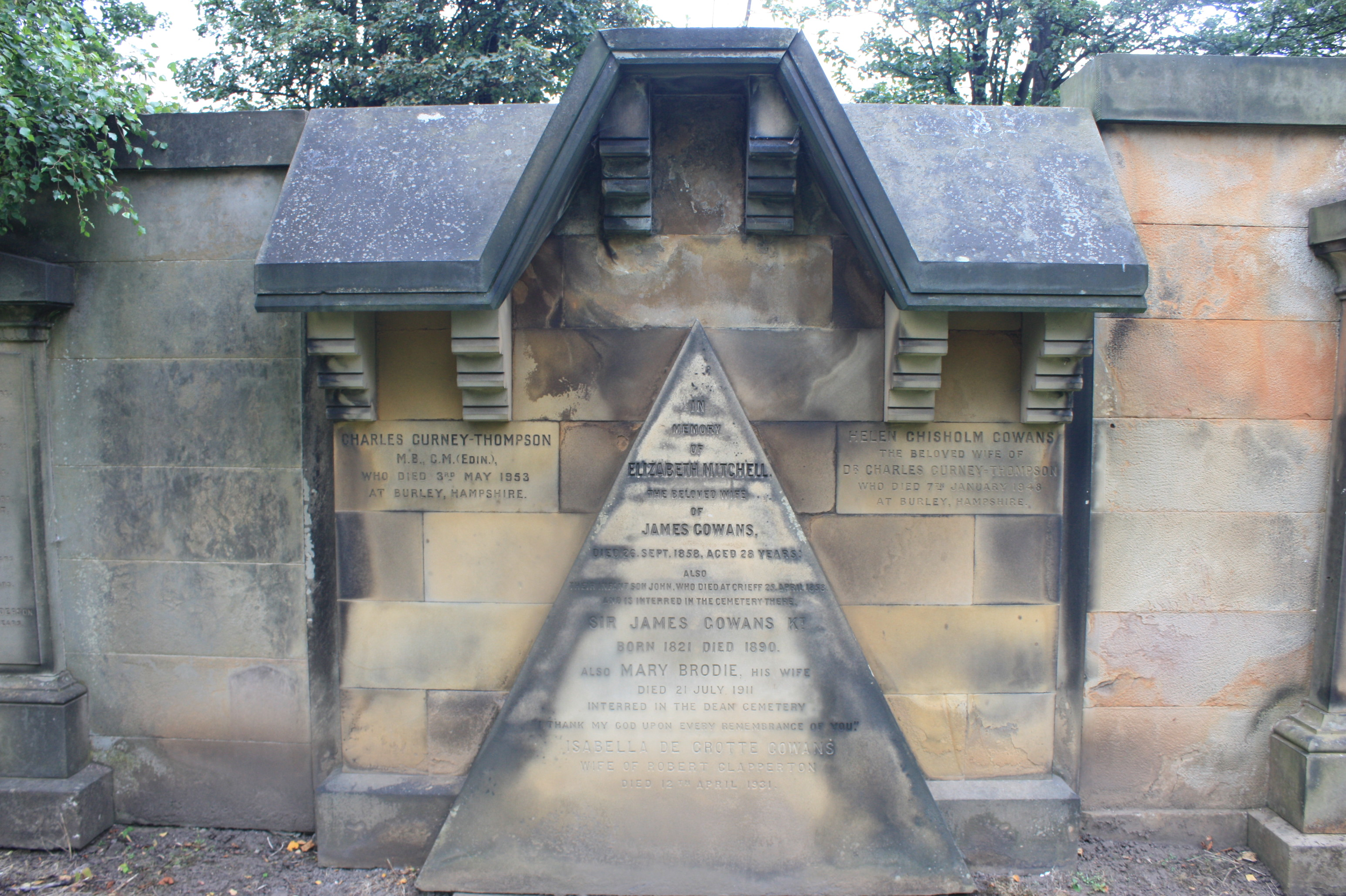
The grave of Sir James Gowans, Grange Cemetery

Sir James Gowans (1 August 1821 – 25 June 1890) was an Edinburgh architect and builder.

== Life ==
Born in Blackness near Linlithgow he was the son of a local mason Walter Gowans (1791–1858) and his wife, Isabella Grott (d.1854).

He trained under the Edinburgh architect David Bryce. In 1848 he married his first wife Elizabeth Mitchell, daughter of James Mitchell a railway contractor. She died in the bath, in their home at 34 Rosebank Cottages, in what would appear unusual circumstances on 26 September 1858. Soon after, he married his second wife, Mary Brodie, daughter of the sculptor William Brodie. He built "Rockville" on Napier Road for them to live in. This house was his tour-de-force and included a five-storey viewing tower. Sculpture in and around the house was by his father-in-law, William Brodie.

He suffered serious financial losses in 1875 due to heavy investment in his own project of the New Theatre Edinburgh, with Frederick Thomas Pilkington as co-investor. It was sold in 1877 to the United Presbyterian Church for one-third of its build cost. He became Edinburgh's Lord Dean of Guild in 1885 (holding the post until 1890) and was largely responsible for organising the International Exhibition of Industry, Science and Art on The Meadows in 1886. He was knighted by Queen Victoria the following year on 18 August, in recognition of his contribution. He was particularly involved in railway building contracts and is famed for his unusual use of multiple stone types in any one building. He was bankrupted in 1888 following the Caledonian Railway's obstruction of a quarry extension at Redhall. He was forced to sell Rockville his masterpiece home and moved to a very modest house at 1 Blantyre Terrace where he died.

He is buried with his first wife, Elizabeth Mitchell, in the Grange Cemetery in Edinburgh. The grave lies against the north wall and is designed in Gowan's distinctive style. His second wife outlived him and is buried in Dean Cemetery, Edinburgh with her father.

== Homes ==
Gowans had a habit of living in buildings he had built, perhaps receiving a property as part of his fee for many. His homes were:

- Gowanbank, his family home near Armadale
- Lynedoch Place, Edinburgh 1840–1848
- 1 Randolph Cliff, Edinburgh (which he built) (1848–1855)
- Pittacher House, Crieff (during his railway project in Perthshire) (1855–1862?)
- 34 Rosebank Cottages, Edinburgh (which he built) (1855–1858)
- "Rockville", Napier Road, Edinburgh (designed and built for himself) (1858–1885)
- 31 Castle Terrace (an office which he built himself) (1875–1888)
- 1 Blantyre Terrace (1885–1890)

=== Rockville ===
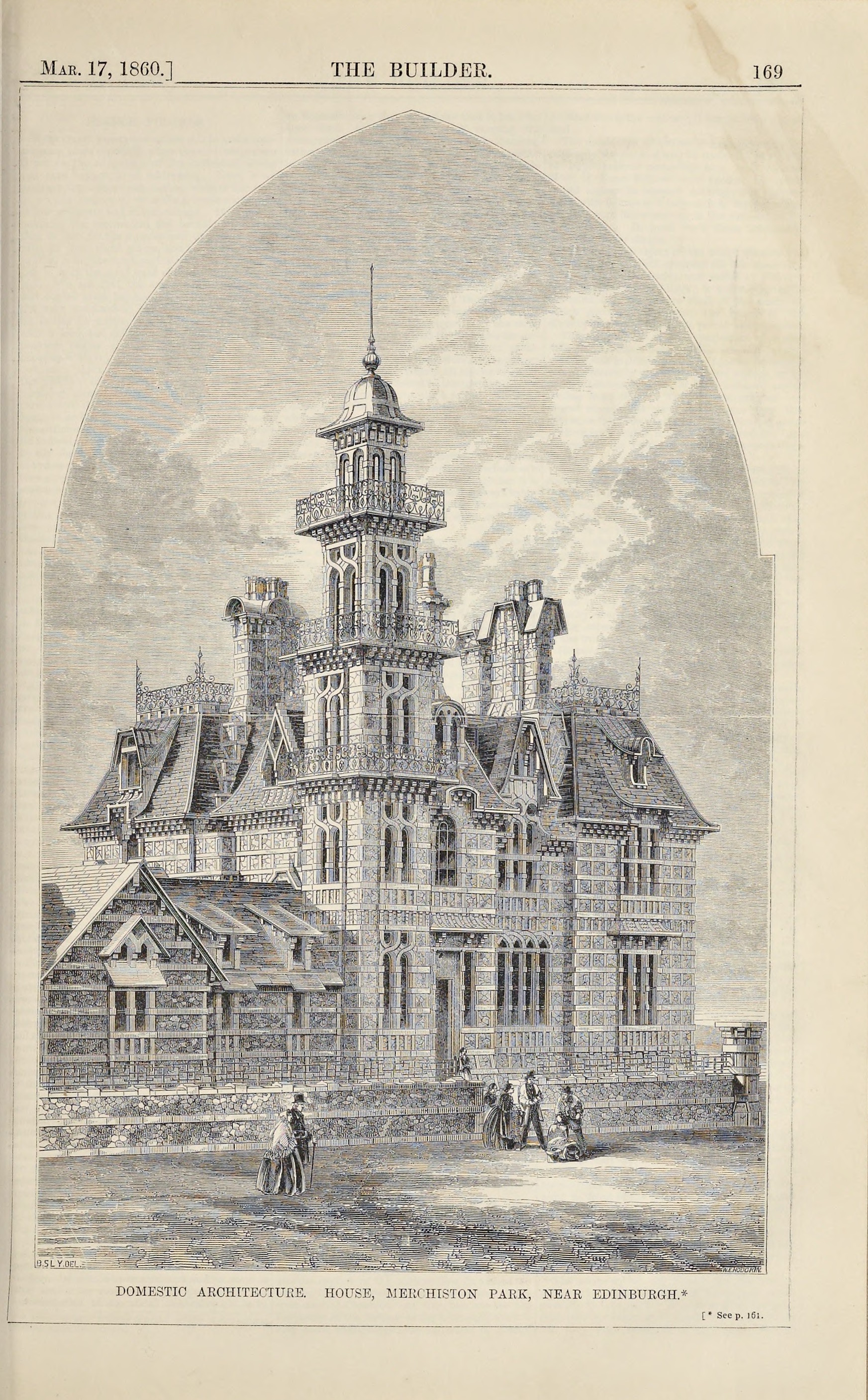
Illustration of Rockville from The Builder (1860)

Standing on a prominent corner at Spylaw Road and Napier Road in the Merchiston area of Edinburgh this house has been described as "the strangest house ever built in Edinburgh".

Local names for it included "The Pagoda", "The Chinese House", "Tottering Towers" and "Crazy Manor". It was a wild gingerbread house-style affair with a five-storey (64-foot) tower with a viewing platform. Every dormer was in a different pattern and style, every chimney stack was highly elaborate and different from the next. Its gate lodge was like a Hansel and Gretel house. Both the lodge and house included stones from every quarry in Scotland plus some Chinese stones to reflect its style. It was the "embodiment of a Gothic novel". But Gowans did not see it as frivolous or extravagant: it was built on a grid system with "no desire to create novelty". It was intended to create an economic and aesthetically pleasing result and certainly succeeded.

It sat in an acre of ground filled with statues by William Brodie his father-in-law.

It had gas lighting in all rooms and elaborate interiors to match its extravagant exterior. Above the kitchen range, it read "Waste not, Want not".

It was demolished in 1966 after a public outcry and 2500 signature petition attempted to save it (a rarity in those non-conservation-minded days) and replaced by three blocks of flats completed in 1972 ("The Limes"). All that survives on site is its boundary wall and some gateposts. However, one statue was removed and now sits on the lower path in West Princes Street Gardens: "The Genius of Architecture crowned by the Theory and Practice of Art".

=== Gowanbank ===
In 1842-62, James Gowans re-modelled a plain, c.1820 farmhouse belonging to his mason-father, Walter Gowans. He extended it into a tight U-plan and transformed its character. A plain roof is modulated by rows of hungry corbels, tall ashlar chimney stacks and a gradual change in stone from coarse masonry to random rubble. More interesting are the steading, cartshed, dairy and cottage, in more mature Gowans style; panelled façade, the rubble completely variegated, different coloured, each stone in its allotted bed. Chimneys are random rubble within panelling. The house at the east end of the byre bears the inscription Heb 111:4 - For every house is built by some man; but he that built all things is God. Eccles, 11:4 1 August 1862. Gowans' rigorous 2 ft module underpins everything.

The house became the farmhouse to a farm of declining viability. By the 1990s, the house was poorly maintained and the steading buildings were abandoned. West Lothian Council's newly-established Lowland Crofting scheme provided a solution, with permission for eleven new houses at Craigengall at the other end of the farm, granted on condition the house and steading buildings were released for restoration and a third of the farmland put into woods walks and wildlife for community benefit. Compare also Blackburn House.

The steading buildings were restored in the 1990s as five houses by local architects William A Cadell & Douglas Davidson.

== List of Works ==
- Building of Randolph Cliff and the north section of Randolph Crescent, Edinburgh (1846)
- Railway contract for Edinburgh to North Berwick section of the North British line (1847–1850)
- The pedestal for Sir John Steell's statue of the Duke of Wellington at the east end of Princes Street in Edinburgh (1852).
- Rosebank Cottages, Edinburgh (1854) He lived here with his first wife until her death in 1858.
- Re-erection of statue to the Duke of Wellington in Falkirk (1854)
- Redhall Bank Cottages, Edinburgh (1857)
- Rockville on Napier Road as his own house (1858) demolished in 1965 to build flats (boundary walls still remain).
- Monument on his father's grave in Torphichen churchyard (1859)
- Monument to his first wife in Grange Cemetery )1859) where he was eventually buried himself
- Workmen's houses in Crieff (1859)
- Pair of villas at 23/25 Blacket Place, Edinburgh (1859)
- Lammerburn on Napier Road, a miniature version of Rockville (1860)
- Railway contract for the Lochee diversion on the Dundee to Newtyle Railway (1859–1861) including Lochee railway station.
- Railway contract for the Creetown section of the Portpatrick Railway (1859) including the railway station in Creetown.
- Railway contract for the Birnam to Dalguise and Dalwhinnie to Kingussie sections of the Perth to Inverness railway (1861–1865)
- Rebuilding of Gowanbank, his father's house near Armadale (1862)
- Lodge house at Redhall, Edinburgh (1863)
- "Pineapple tenement" at Castle Terrace/ Cornwall Street, Edinburgh (1866) Gowans ran an office from here 1875 to 1888.
- School and schoolhouse at Kingscavil, West Lothian (1870)
- Workmens Cottages, Drumbowie, West Lothian (1871)
- Laying of tracks for the Edinburgh Corporation Tramways between Edinburgh and Leith (1871)
- Remodelling of Drumbowie House, West Lothian (1873)
- New Edinburgh Theatre, Castle Terrace (1875), converted to the Synod Hall in 1877 following its financial collapse. Demolished in 1965 for an opera house that was never built. Redeveloped in 1990 as Saltire Court.
- Waverley House (82 Colinton Road, Edinburgh) for the penmaker Duncan Cameron (1884)
- 1–4 Lockharton Gardens (off Colinton Road near Waverley House) (1884)
- 68–78 Colinton Road (1885/6)
- Brass Founders' Pillar for the Edinburgh International Exhibition on the Meadows (later moved to Nicolson Square) (1886) note: the figure on the column is by John Stevenson Rhind.
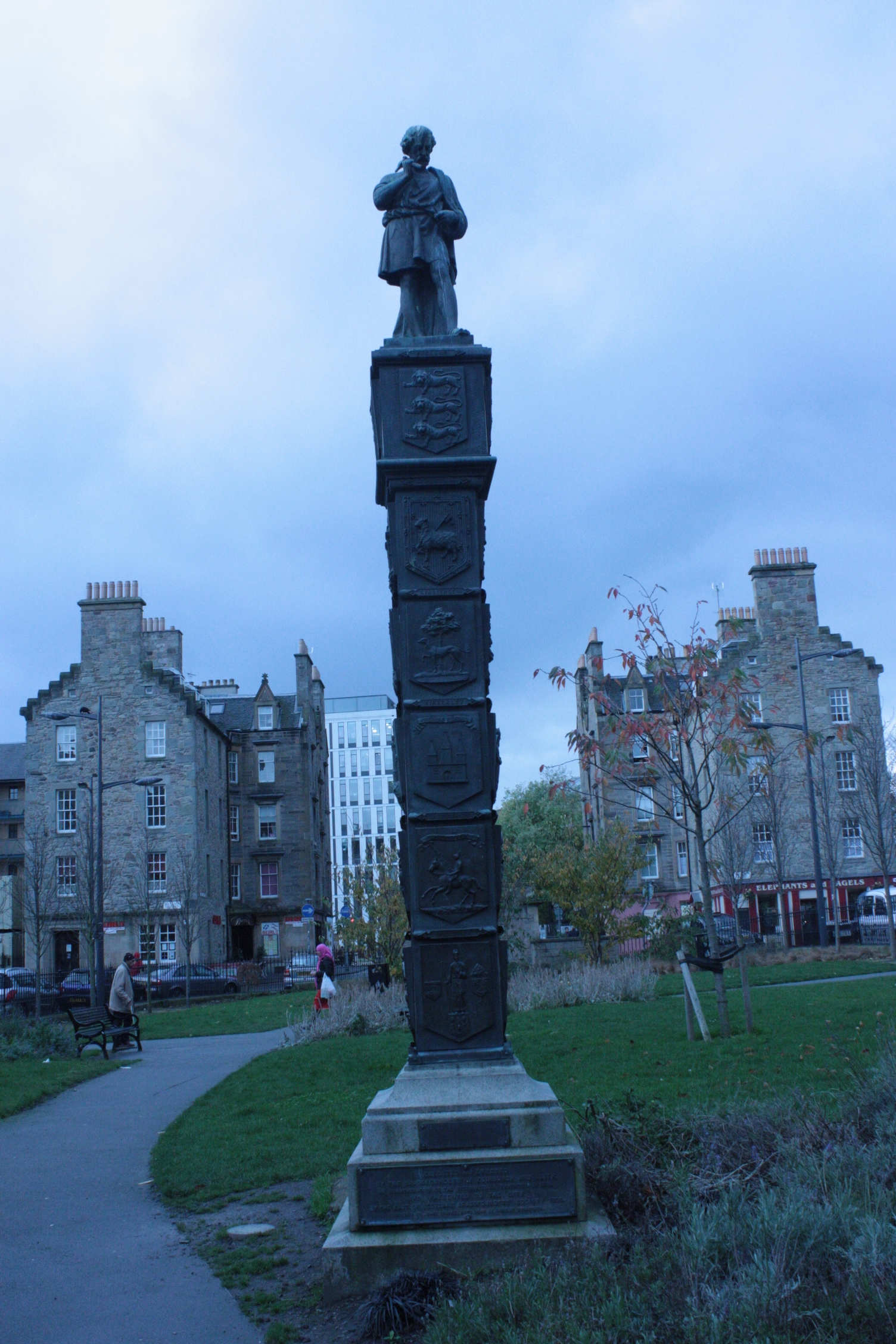
  The Brass Founders' Pillar from the Edinburgh International Exhibition
- Model houses for the Edinburgh International Exhibition (1886) later moved to 157–159 Colinton Road.
- 64–66 Colinton Road (1886/7)
- Masons pillars and sundial for the Edinburgh International Exhibition (1886) are still in situ on the Meadows.
