= Alexander Crichton (silversmith) =

Scottish silversmith

1882 Claret jug by Alexander Crichton

Silver maker's mark for Alexander Crichton

Alexander Crichton (22 November 1839 – 20 November 1899) was a Scottish silversmith from Edinburgh.

He was the son of Walter Crichton, also a silversmith, and Jessie Slater Crichton. An 1873/4 condiment set, the earliest known piece from his workshop, was sold by Hamilton Crichton & Co., Scottish goldsmiths of 41 George Street, Edinburgh. A pair of shields made by Alexander Crichton, after the design of Sir Noel Paton, were shown at the Edinburgh Exhibition of 1886 by J Crichton & Co., of 47 George Street, Edinburgh. By far the largest collection of Crichton claret jugs passed through the hands of the Dukes of Hamilton of Brodick Castle on the Isle of Arran.

Crichton's first known major work is an 1878 pair of parcel gilt shields based on Shakespeare’s “A Midsummer Night's Dream”, and inspired by the two paintings by Sir Joseph Noel Paton, “The Quarrel” and “The Reconciliation of Oberon and Titania.” The shields embody high standards of casting, embossing and chasing, the same craftsmanship which won Crichton a prize of £25 awarded by the Goldsmiths Company at the Society of Arts Exhibition in 1870 for his repousse cup.

Crichton's whimsy is seen in some of the finest English silver of the period, and is thought to be based on the drawings of Sir John Tenniel for Alice in Wonderland and Alice Through the Looking-Glass. This link with Tenniel may date back to Tenniel's friendship with Paton when they were involved in a competition to decorate Westminster Hall. Illustrating Dodgson's books had Tenniel creating some of the most enduring characters of all time. Translating these fantasy figures into tangible objects is regarded as Crichton’s greatest triumph.

Crichton created more than 34 animal-shaped silver and glass claret jugs between 1881 and 1882, many of these designs being registered at the Patents Office.

Crichton's mark was registered at the Goldsmiths Hall in November 1872 and his workshop recorded as being at 47 Great Russell Street; he then moved to 45 Rathbone Place, Oxford Street, having started a partnership with Charles John Curry, trading as Crichton & Curry, and listed as designers, modellers and silversmiths. A severe recession in the early 1880s led to the firm's downfall, the partnership being dissolved by October 1884 with Crichton bankrupt in December 1886. Before his bankruptcy Crichton designed a table lighter shaped like a bear and honeypot for the Victorian sculptor Sir Joseph Boehm, donated to the Royal Academy in 1883.

Crichton moved to Sheffield and requested a discharge from his bankruptcy in 1899. He died in Sheffield in November 1899.
