= Rhind =

Rhind may refer to:

- Aaron Rhind (born 1991), Australian swimmer
- Alex Rhind, Scottish footballer, played in the 1872 Scotland v England football match
- Alexander Rhind (1821–1897), American naval officer
  - USS Rhind (DD-404), US destroyer named after Alexander Rhind
- Alexander Henry Rhind (1833–1863), Scottish lawyer
  - Rhind Lectures, a series of lectures on topics of archaeology originally funded by a bequeath from Alexander Henry Rhind
  - Rhind Mathematical Papyrus, Egyptian papyrus named after Alexander Henry Rhind
- David Rhind (1808–1883), Scottish architect
- David William Rhind (1943–2025), British geographer
- Ethel Rhind, Irish artist
- James Robert Rhind (1854–1918), Scottish architect
- John Rhind (architect) (1836–1889), Scottish architect
- John Rhind (1828–1892), Scottish sculptor, father of William Birnie Rhind and J. Massey Rhind
- John Stevenson Rhind, Scottish sculptor
- J. Massey Rhind (1860–1936), Scottish-American architectural sculptor
- Julian Rhind-Tutt (born 1967) English actor
- Neil Rhind (born 1937), English writer and historian
- Robert Rhind, Scottish footballer
- Sir Thomas Duncan Rhind (1871–1927), Scottish architect and military figure
- William Birnie Rhind (1853–1933), Scottish architectural sculptor
