= List of listed buildings in Edinburgh/5 =

This is a list of listed buildings in Edinburgh, Scotland.

== List ==
Name	Location	Date Listed	Grid Ref. (Note: Sometimes known as OSGB36, the grid reference (where provided) is based on the British national grid reference system used by the Ordnance Survey. • "Guide to National Grid". Ordnance Survey. • "Get-a-map". Ordnance Survey.)	Geo-coordinates	Notes	LB Number (Note: Historic Environment Scotland assign a unique alphanumeric identifier to each designated site in Scotland, for listed buildings this always begins with "LB", for example "LB12345".)	Image
University Of Edinburgh Former George Watson's Ladies College George Square Excluding 4-Storey Eastern Addition Of 1902				55°56′40″N 3°11′19″W	Category B	28002	Upload Photo
Heriot Place And Vennel, Bastion Of Flodden Wall, And Telfer Wall (Section)				55°56′46″N 3°11′49″W	Category A	28006	Upload another image
Colinton Road, Redford Cavalry Barracks With Officer's Mess, Balaclava House, Guard House, Gates, Gatepiers, Sergeant's Mess, Former Band Block, Education Block, Former Stables, Stores And Other Ancillary Buildings				55°54′50″N 3°14′25″W	Category B	28009	Upload Photo
Edinburgh Castle, Batteries, Including Argyle, Dury's, Forewall, Half-Moon, And Western Defences				55°56′54″N 3°11′56″W	Category A	28010	Upload Photo
Edinburgh Castle, 2 K6 Telephone Kiosks At Gatehouse				55°56′54″N 3°11′56″W	Category B	28012	Upload Photo
Craigmillar Castle Road Craigmillar Castle Dairy				55°55′33″N 3°08′20″W	Category B	28017	Upload Photo
Liberton Drive, Liberton Tower				55°54′52″N 3°10′39″W	Category A	28021	Upload Photo
Holyroodhouse, Palace Of Holyroodhouse Including Gates, Gatepiers, Boundary Walls And Railings				55°57′10″N 3°10′20″W	Category A	28022	Upload another image
Holyroodhouse, Gatehouse And Former Guard Rooms				55°57′09″N 3°10′26″W	Category B	28025	Upload another image
31, 33 Brunstane Road South, Brunstane House				55°56′24″N 3°05′38″W	Category A	28034	Upload Photo
Greenbank Crescent, Braidburn Valley Gatepiers Including Gates And Railings				55°55′09″N 3°12′47″W	Category C(S)	27918	Upload Photo
1, 2 And 3 Wellington Place And Railings				55°58′16″N 3°10′11″W	Category B	27921	Upload Photo
8-11 (Inclusive Nos) Wellington Place With Boundary Walls And Railings				55°58′17″N 3°10′10″W	Category B	27923	Upload Photo
Dalkeith Road, Newington (Echobank) Cemetery, Including 222 Dalkeith Road (Lodge), Vaults, Gates, Gatepiers And Boundary Walls				55°55′56″N 3°09′59″W	Category B	27933	Upload Photo
Brae Park Road, Cramond Old Bridge				55°57′55″N 3°18′58″W	Category A	27940	Upload Photo
George Iv Bridge With Railings				55°56′54″N 3°11′31″W	Category A	27942	Upload Photo
73 Belford Road, Dean Gallery, (Former Dean Orphanage), Including Lodges, Terrace, Boundary Walls, Steps And Gates				55°57′07″N 3°13′27″W	Category A	27969	Upload another image
Edinburgh Academy 48 Henderson Row				55°57′39″N 3°12′16″W	Category A	27973	Upload another image
Lauriston Place, George Heriot's School, Examination Hall				55°56′44″N 3°11′44″W	Category B	27978	Upload Photo
Lauriston Place, George Heriot's School, Main Building				55°56′45″N 3°11′41″W	Category A	27980	Upload another image See more images
Union Canal, Bridge No 18 (Near Clifton Hall)				55°55′14″N 3°25′47″W	Category B	27827	Upload Photo
99 New Kirkgate, Trinity House With Boundary Walls, Gates, Gatepiers And Railings				55°58′20″N 3°10′17″W	Category A	27834	Upload Photo
30 Pilrig House Close, Pilrig House				55°58′10″N 3°10′53″W	Category A	27841	Upload Photo
3 And 5 Pilrig Street With Boundary Walls And Railings				55°57′52″N 3°10′43″W	Category B	27845	Upload Photo
11 And 13 Pilrig Street With Boundary Walls And Railings				55°57′53″N 3°10′45″W	Category B	27848	Upload Photo
William Gladstone Memorial Coates Crescent And Shandwick Place				55°56′55″N 3°12′44″W	Category A	27856	Upload another image See more images
West Princes Street Gardens, Thomas Guthrie Monument				55°57′03″N 3°12′10″W	Category B	27858	Upload another image
61 Queen Charlotte Street With Boundary Walls, Gates And Railings				55°58′24″N 3°09′57″W	Category B	27867	Upload Photo
28-42 (Even Nos) Queen Charlotte Street And 94 Constitution Street And 1 Queen Charlotte Lane				55°58′25″N 3°10′07″W	Category B	27871	Upload Photo
46 Queen Charlotte Street				55°58′24″N 3°10′04″W	Category C(S)	27875	Upload Photo
Princes Street, Monument To Duke Of Wellington				55°57′13″N 3°11′21″W	Category A	27879	Upload another image See more images
East Princes Street Gardens, John Wilson Monument				55°57′07″N 3°11′42″W	Category A	27881	Upload another image
Edinburgh Castle Esplanade, Duke Of York Statue				55°56′56″N 3°11′52″W	Category B	27883	Upload another image See more images
24-31 (Inclusive Nos) Shore, Former Ship Hotel				55°58′36″N 3°10′09″W	Category C(S)	27889	Upload Photo
St Bernard's Well, Off St Bernard's Bridge, Including Stair, Walls, Railings And Plaque				55°57′19″N 3°12′41″W	Category A	27905	Upload another image
16 Tower Street				55°58′36″N 3°09′59″W	Category B	27913	Upload Photo
Ratho Village, 73 And 75 (Odd Nos) Main Street And Boundary Wall				55°55′17″N 3°22′50″W	Category C(S)	27745	Upload Photo
Regent Road, St Andrew's House Including Boundary Wall, Lamp Standards And Gates				55°57′13″N 3°11′02″W	Category A	27756	Upload another image
Ratho Village, 40 Main Street, Fernbank And Boundary Wall				55°55′20″N 3°22′44″W	Category C(S)	27757	Upload Photo
7 West Brighton Crescent				55°57′04″N 3°07′09″W	Category B	27758	Upload Photo
334, 336C-340 And 346A Leith Walk With Railings And Lamp Standards				55°57′52″N 3°10′40″W	Category C(S)	27763	Upload Photo
6-9 (Inclusive Nos) Links Gardens And 1 Links Gardens Lane				55°58′18″N 3°09′43″W	Category B	27771	Upload Photo
Ratho Village, 58-60 (Even Nos), Main Street				55°55′19″N 3°22′49″W	Category B	27777	Upload Photo
5 And 6 (Inclusive Nos) Maritime Street				55°58′28″N 3°10′09″W	Category B	27791	Upload Photo
Brass Founders' Pillar, Nicolson Square				55°56′46″N 3°11′07″W	Category B	27797	Upload another image
Regent Road, Burns Monument Including Boundary Wall And Railings				55°57′12″N 3°10′42″W	Category A	27801	Upload another image
Union Canal, Jawbridge, Bridge No 13				55°55′02″N 3°20′32″W	Category B	27810	Upload Photo
9-23 (Odd Nos) Nile Grove With Boundary Walls And Gatepiers				55°55′35″N 3°12′24″W	Category B	27660	Upload Photo
26 Leith Walk With Boundary Walls And Railings				55°58′13″N 3°10′22″W	Category B	27667	Upload Photo
29-39 (Odd Nos) Nile Grove With Boundary Walls And Gatepiers				55°55′35″N 3°12′21″W	Category B	27668	Upload Photo
Ratho Park Ice House				55°55′29″N 3°21′40″W	Category C(S)	27670	Upload Photo
3 Rosefield Place				55°57′06″N 3°07′03″W	Category C(S)	27681	Upload Photo
Mound Place And Castlehill, New College And Assembly Hall, With Railings, Gates, Gatepiers And Lamp Standards				55°56′58″N 3°11′43″W	Category A	27689	Upload another image
7 Rosefield Place				55°57′07″N 3°07′03″W	Category C(S)	27691	Upload Photo
68-76 (Even Nos) Leith Walk				55°58′10″N 3°10′23″W	Category B	27692	Upload Photo
234-242 (Even Nos) Leith Walk, Former Victoria India Rubber Mills Buildings				55°58′00″N 3°10′32″W	Category B	27712	Upload Photo
Ratho Village, 18 Baird Road, Clearence Cottage And Boundary Wall				55°55′23″N 3°22′41″W	Category B	27725	Upload Photo
3 Morningside Place				55°55′50″N 3°12′38″W	Category C(S)	27728	Upload Photo
Craig House, Napier University, Craighouse Road And Morningside Drive				55°55′17″N 3°13′36″W	Category A	27736	Upload Photo
26-40 (Even Nos) Kirk Street				55°58′15″N 3°10′27″W	Category C(S)	27580	Upload Photo
10, 12, 14 Morningside Road And 3-19 (Odd Nos) Colinton Road				55°56′02″N 3°12′38″W	Category B	27581	Upload Photo
44 And 46 Kirk Street				55°58′13″N 3°10′28″W	Category B	27585	Upload Photo
18 Morningside Road, Morningside Baptist Church (Former Free Church) With Church Halls And Offices				55°56′01″N 3°12′38″W	Category B	27586	Upload Photo
Newliston House, Dovecot				55°56′47″N 3°25′25″W	Category B	27593	Upload Photo
Leith Docks, Alexandra Dry Dock				55°58′45″N 3°10′09″W	Category B	27595	Upload Photo
Newliston House, East Lodge With Gatepiers And Walls				55°56′45″N 3°24′54″W	Category B	27599	Upload Photo
24 Regent Street				55°57′11″N 3°06′44″W	Category C(S)	27600	Upload Photo
Leith Docks, Alexandra Dry Dock Hydraulic Station				55°58′45″N 3°10′11″W	Category B	27601	Upload Photo
Leith Docks, Edinburgh Dock And Swing Bridge				55°58′42″N 3°09′45″W	Category B	27606	Upload Photo
Newliston House, Inner Lodge				55°56′46″N 3°25′21″W	Category C(S)	27609	Upload Photo
30 And 31 Chambers Street, Former Edinburgh Dental Hospital And School				55°56′51″N 3°11′28″W	Category B	27622	Upload another image
Newbattle Terrace, Police Box				55°55′51″N 3°12′33″W	Category B	27630	Upload Photo
Ransfield Road, Trefoil Centre (Formerly Kirklands Lodge) With Garden Walls Gateway And Freestanding Column				55°55′17″N 3°20′07″W	Category B	27642	Upload Photo
Leith Docks, Victoria Swing Bridge				55°58′44″N 3°10′12″W	Category B	27644	Upload Photo
18 Newbattle Terrace, Dominion Cinema				55°55′50″N 3°12′31″W	Category B	27650	Upload Photo
1, 1A Nile Grove, Morningside Braid Church (C Of S) With Church Halls				55°55′36″N 3°12′30″W	Category B	27655	Upload Photo
100-118 Great Junction Street (Formerly John Crabbie And Co)				55°58′22″N 3°10′28″W	Category B	27501	Upload Photo
York Place And 8 Broughton Street, St Paul's And St George's (Scottish Episcopal) Church, Including Lamp And Railings				55°57′24″N 3°11′19″W	Category A	27509	Upload another image
61-79 (Odd Nos) Morningside Park				55°55′46″N 3°12′49″W	Category B	27518	Upload Photo
Ferry Road, St Serf's Church (Church Of Scotland), With Boundary Wall, Gates And Gatepiers				55°58′19″N 3°12′19″W	Category B	27522	Upload another image See more images
Kirkliston Village, Newliston Road, Breast Mill House, Outbuildings And Boundary Walls				55°56′55″N 3°24′22″W	Category B	27523	Upload Photo
22 John's Lane				55°58′23″N 3°10′03″W	Category C(S)	27530	Upload Photo
Morningside Road, Bore Stone				55°55′52″N 3°12′35″W	Category C(S)	27536	Upload Photo
3-10 (Inclusive Nos) John's Place With Boundary Walls And Railings				55°58′23″N 3°10′01″W	Category B	27540	Upload Photo
33A-39 (Odd Nos) Morningside Road				55°55′57″N 3°12′35″W	Category B	27551	Upload Photo
Lin's Mill And House				55°55′17″N 3°25′57″W	Category C(S)	27553	Upload Photo
Archers' Hall, Buccleuch Street				55°56′32″N 3°11′04″W	Category B	27562	Upload Photo
43 And 45 Regent Street				55°57′13″N 3°06′39″W	Category C(S)	27564	Upload Photo
8-20 (Even Nos) Kirk Street				55°58′15″N 3°10′23″W	Category C(S)	27577	Upload Photo
Kirkliston Village, High Street, Kirkliston Parish Church With Watch House And Graveyard, Walls And Gatepiers				55°57′16″N 3°24′12″W	Category A	27457	Upload another image
8, 9 And 10 Jordan Lane				55°55′38″N 3°12′26″W	Category C(S)	27465	Upload Photo
5A-5C Kirkgate, St Mary's (South Leith Parish) Church (C Of S) With Graveyard, Walls, Gates And Railings				55°58′19″N 3°10′14″W	Category A	27466	Upload another image See more images
164-172 (Even Nos) Portobello High Street				55°57′10″N 3°06′50″W	Category C(S)	27472	Upload Photo
125-143 (Odd Nos) Great Junction Street				55°58′21″N 3°10′31″W	Category C(S)	27478	Upload Photo
Kirkliston Village, 15 High Street				55°57′15″N 3°24′04″W	Category C(S)	27481	Upload Photo
210-240 (Even Nos) Portobello High Street And 1 Marlborough Street				55°57′09″N 3°06′44″W	Category C(S)	27486	Upload Photo
15 Jordan Lane				55°55′38″N 3°12′21″W	Category B	27488	Upload Photo
242-252 (Even Nos) Portobello High Street; 2-6 (Even Nos) Marlborough Street				55°57′08″N 3°06′39″W	Category B	27491	Upload Photo
Kirkliston Village, 21 And 23 (Odd Nos), High Street				55°57′15″N 3°24′06″W	Category C(S)	27494	Upload Photo
254-284 (Even Nos) Portobello High Street, 1A Bellfield Lane				55°57′07″N 3°06′34″W	Category C(S)	27495	Upload Photo
48, 50 Great Junction Street And 2 Henderson Street				55°58′17″N 3°10′23″W	Category B	27496	Upload Photo
5 South Gray's Close, St Patrick's Roman Catholic Church				55°56′59″N 3°11′04″W	Category B	27498	Upload Photo
125 Moira Terrace, Portobello Road				55°57′27″N 3°07′47″W	Category C(S)	27378	Upload Photo
High Street And Parliament Square, St Giles (High) Kirk				55°56′58″N 3°11′27″W	Category A	27381	Upload another image See more images
127 Moira Terrace, Portobello Road, Wilson Memorial Church (Portobello United Free Church)				55°57′26″N 3°07′45″W	Category B	27385	Upload Photo
134-138 (Even Nos) Constitution Street				55°58′20″N 3°10′10″W	Category B	27386	Upload Photo
1-5 (Odd Nos) Duke Street And 1 And 2 Newkirkgate				55°58′15″N 3°10′18″W	Category C(S)	27399	Upload Photo
5, 5A, 7 And 7A South Fort Street With Front Steps And Railings; Eh6 4Dl				55°58′28″N 3°11′00″W	Category B	27408	Upload Photo
195 And 197 Portobello High Street				55°57′08″N 3°06′49″W	Category C(S)	27411	Upload Photo
203 And 205 Portobello High Street				55°57′08″N 3°06′48″W	Category B	27424	Upload Photo
Castle Terrace, St Mark's Church (Unitarian), Including Railings And Lamp Standards				55°56′55″N 3°12′20″W	Category B	27434	Upload Photo
Polwarth Crescent And Yeaman Place Walker Bridge				55°56′19″N 3°13′06″W	Category C(S)	27293	Upload another image See more images
2 Gillsland Road South				55°55′49″N 3°13′14″W	Category B	27296	Upload Photo
St John's Road And 1 Kaimes Road, St Anne's Parish Church, Including Boundary Walls, Postbox, Gatepiers, Gates, Railings And Street Light				55°56′32″N 3°16′24″W	Category A	27297	Upload another image See more images
Gogar Station Road, Kellerstain House				55°55′43″N 3°19′59″W	Category B	27299	Upload Photo
29-35 Odd Nos Polwarth Crescent And 3 Temple Park Crescent				55°56′17″N 3°13′06″W	Category C(S)	27300	Upload Photo
143 Grange Loan Astley Ainslie Hospital, Canaan House				55°55′47″N 3°11′56″W	Category B	27303	Upload Photo
St Bernard's Church (C Of S) Saxe - Coburg (Formerly West Claremont) Street				55°57′37″N 3°12′24″W	Category B	27311	Upload Photo
Gogar Station Road, Millburn Policies, South Lodge Walls And Gatepiers				55°55′45″N 3°19′33″W	Category B	27313	Upload Photo
Hatton Estate, S Terrace Wall With Pavilions And Bath-House				55°54′15″N 3°23′43″W	Category A	27334	Upload Photo
16-22 (Even Nos) Marlborough Street				55°57′10″N 3°06′38″W	Category B	27336	Upload Photo
86-90 (Even Nos) Constitution Street				55°58′26″N 3°10′05″W	Category B	27337	Upload Photo
Hatton Estate, East Avenue Gates				55°54′22″N 3°22′43″W	Category A	27341	Upload Photo
39 And 39A Portland Street With Front Walls, Steps And Railings; Eh6 4Bb				55°58′38″N 3°10′57″W	Category C(S)	27347	Upload Photo
28 And 28A Polwarth Terrace				55°56′06″N 3°13′22″W	Category C(S)	27349	Upload Photo
28-30A (Even Nos) Marlborough Street				55°57′11″N 3°06′36″W	Category B	27350	Upload Photo
96 -104 (Even Nos) Constitution Street And 3, 3A Queen Charlotte Lane				55°58′24″N 3°10′06″W	Category B	27351	Upload Photo
41 (Bf & Gf) And 43 Portland Street With Front Walls, Steps And Railings; Eh6 4Bb				55°58′38″N 3°10′57″W	Category C(S)	27354	Upload Photo
44 Polwarth Terrace With Boundary Wall And Gatepiers				55°56′00″N 3°13′27″W	Category B	27356	Upload another image
12 Palmerston Place, Palmerston Place Church Including Wall And Railings				55°56′51″N 3°12′58″W	Category B	27220	Upload another image
16 And 18 Pittville Street				55°57′09″N 3°06′20″W	Category C(S)	27223	Upload Photo
7 And 8 East Brighton Crescent				55°57′02″N 3°06′57″W	Category B	27225	Upload Photo
87 And 89 Colinton Road				55°55′48″N 3°13′20″W	Category C(S)	27227	Upload Photo
9 And 10 East Brighton Crescent				55°57′02″N 3°06′59″W	Category B	27232	Upload Photo
93 And 95 Colinton Road, Brizlee, With Boundary Walls And Gatepiers				55°55′47″N 3°13′23″W	Category B	27234	Upload Photo
287 Portobello High Street And St Mark's Place, St Mark's Episcopal Church, Including Gates, Gatepiers And Boundary Walls				55°57′04″N 3°06′31″W	Category B	27245	Upload Photo
8 Eden Lane, Harmony House, With Boundary Walls				55°55′49″N 3°12′15″W	Category B	27249	Upload Photo
7 Restalrig Road South, Restalrig Parish Church, Church Of Scotland, Including St Triduana's Aisle, Graveyard, Gatehouse And Boundary Walls				55°57′28″N 3°08′58″W	Category A	27250	Upload another image See more images
11 And 12 Glasgow Road, Middle Norton				55°56′16″N 3°22′08″W	Category C(S)	27260	Upload Photo
44 Newhaven Main Street				55°58′50″N 3°11′48″W	Category C(S)	27275	Upload Photo
10 Napier Road Lammerburn With Boundary Wall And Gatepiers				55°56′00″N 3°12′58″W	Category A	27279	Upload Photo
2 And 2A Forbes Road, The Lodge, With Former Gig House And Cosvhmsn's House, Boundary Walls And Gatepiers				55°56′05″N 3°12′28″W	Category B	27282	Upload Photo
46 And 48 Brighton Place, 1A West Brighton Crescent				55°57′03″N 3°07′06″W	Category B	27154	Upload Photo
45-53 (Odd Nos) Constitution Street				55°58′29″N 3°10′00″W	Category B	27155	Upload Photo
Malleny Estate, Scott Burial Vault				55°53′11″N 3°20′06″W	Category C(S)	27162	Upload Photo
55 Constitution Street With Boundary Walls And Railings				55°58′28″N 3°10′01″W	Category B	27164	Upload Photo
21-33 (Odd Nos) Colinton Road				55°56′01″N 3°12′40″W	Category B	27165	Upload Photo
7, 7A And 9 (Odd Nos) Craighall Road, Newhaven Church Of Scotland Including Hall, Vestry, Gatepiers And Railings And 7 Craighall Road, Old Schoolhouse				55°58′47″N 3°11′49″W	Category B	27167	Upload Photo
Malleny House With Walled Garden, Bothy, Ironwork, Gates, Gatepiers, Green Cottage And Stables				55°53′09″N 3°20′15″W	Category A	27172	Upload Photo
29 Pittville Street				55°57′08″N 3°06′24″W	Category C(S)	27179	Upload Photo

== Key ==
The scheme for classifying buildings in Scotland is:

- Category A: "buildings of national or international importance, either architectural or historic; or fine, little-altered examples of some particular period, style or building type."
- Category B: "buildings of regional or more than local importance; or major examples of some particular period, style or building type, which may have been altered."
- Category C: "buildings of local importance; lesser examples of any period, style, or building type, as originally constructed or moderately altered; and simple traditional buildings which group well with other listed buildings."

In March 2016 there were 47,288 listed buildings in Scotland. Of these, 8% were Category A, and 50% were Category B, with the remaining 42% being Category C.

== See also ==
- List of listed buildings in Edinburgh
