= John Stevenson Rhind =

Scottish sculptor (1859–1937)

- Born: 1859
- Died: 1937 (aged 77–78)
- Known for: Sculpture

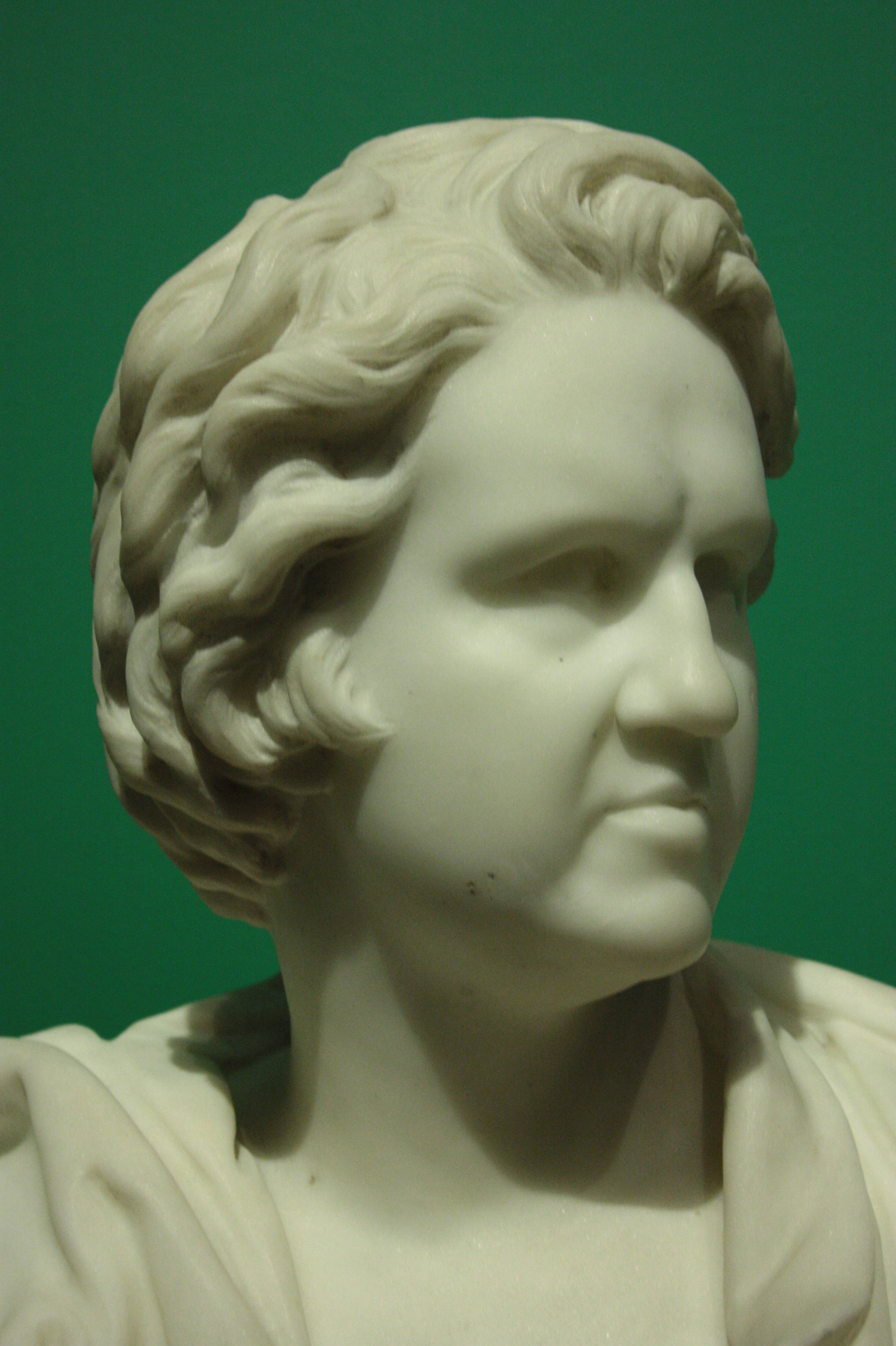
James Young Simpson by John Stevenson Rhind 1889

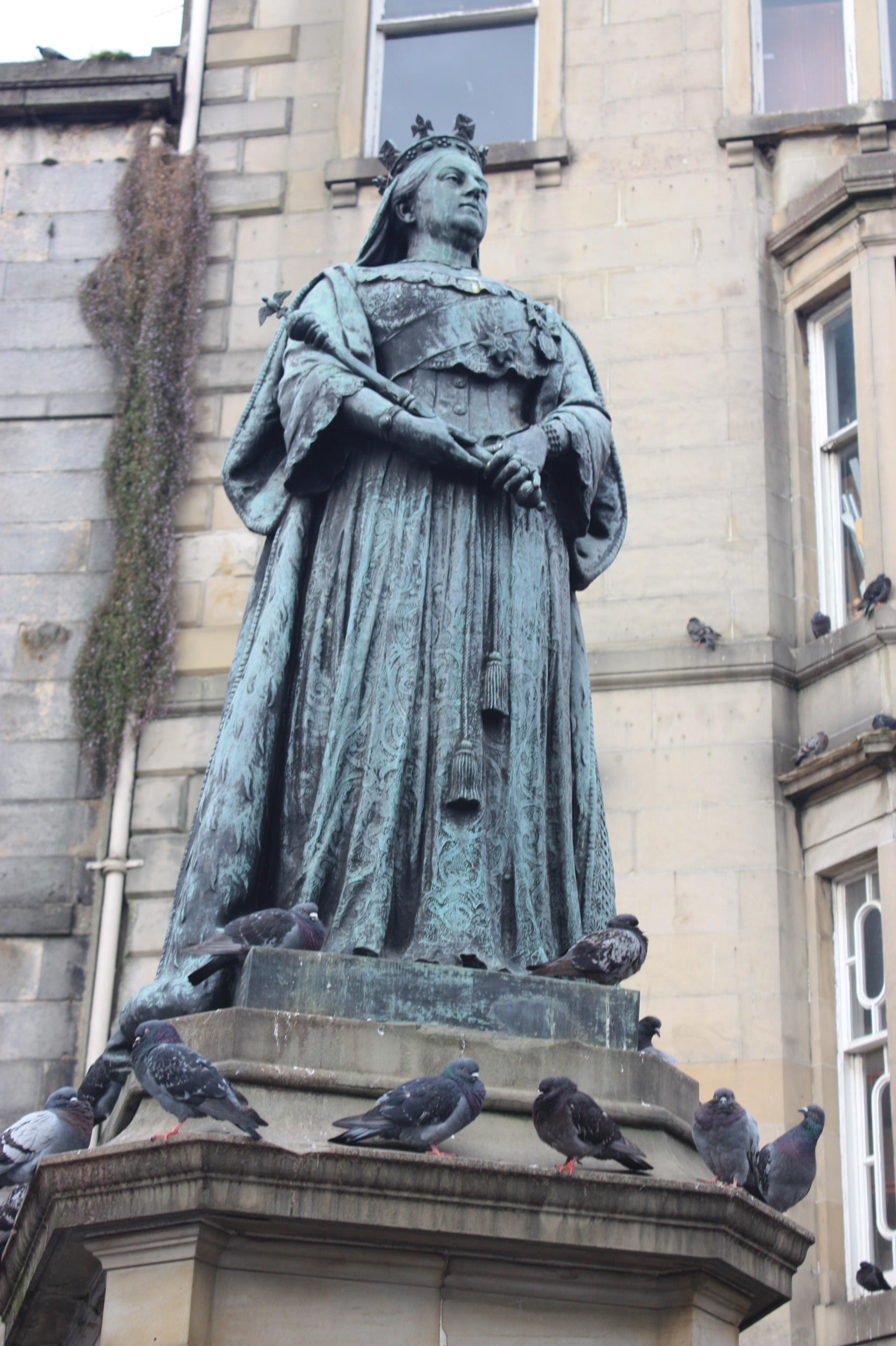
Statue of Queen Victoria, Foot of Leith Walk, Leith, Edinburgh

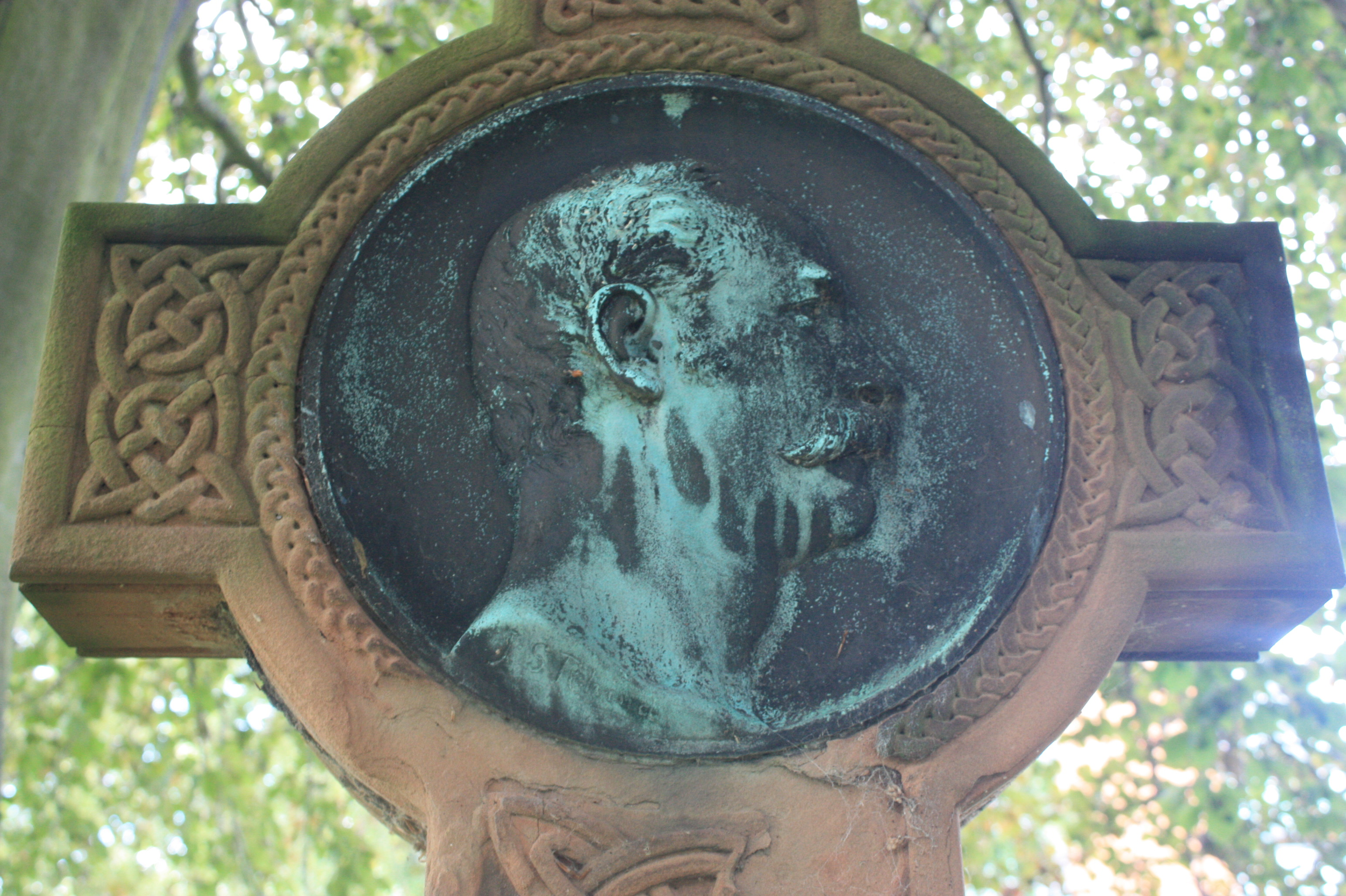
Thomas Stuart Burnett by John Stevenson Rhind

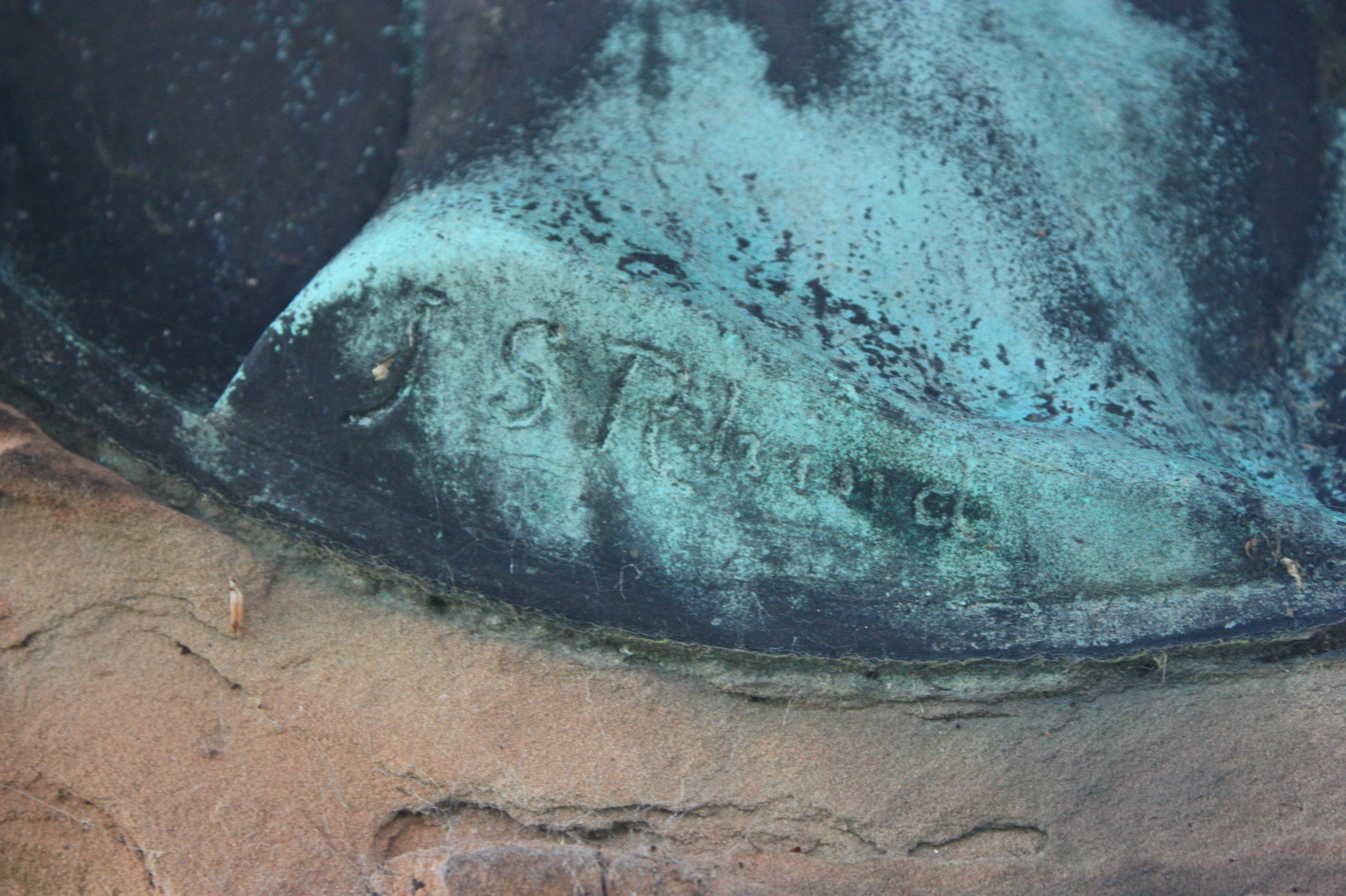
John Stevenson Rhind's signature

for others with the same name see Rhind

John Stevenson Rhind (1859 – 1937) was a Scottish sculptor based in Edinburgh.

== Life ==
Less is known of John Stevenson than of his family counterparts in Edinburgh but he was a nephew of John Rhind and cousin of William Birnie Rhind and J. Massey Rhind, all sculptors in Edinburgh. He would appear to also connect to the family of David Watson Stevenson and apparently links between these two prominent Scottish sculpting families.

He is known to have attended the Royal Scottish Academy Life School 1881–7. In 1886, he won the RSA prize for modelling. He exhibited in the Royal Scottish Academy from 1877 to 1920.

His sculpture is however well-represented across the city.

From 1901 until death on 28 July 1937, he lived and worked from Belford Road in Edinburgh, working from the Dean Studios.

He is buried in Dalry Cemetery in the south-west of Edinburgh with his wife, Janet Scott Brunton (1860-1919). The grave lies against the north wall, west of the Dalry Road entrance.

== Principal Public Works ==
- Small bronze figure of Tubal-cain on top of Sir James Gowans’ Brass Founders' Pillar in Nicolson Square (1886)
- Bust of Sir James Young Simpson (1889) held by the National Gallery of Scotland
- Obelisk to Sir James Steel, Lord Provost of Edinburgh, Dean Cemetery (1906)
- Statue to Queen Victoria at the Foot of Leith Walk (1907)
- Statue of Edward VII in Victoria Park (1913)
- Celtic Cross at Gretna Memorial in Rosebank Cemetery, Edinburgh (1916)

== Other Known Works ==
- Memorial to Thomas Stuart Burnett, Dean Cemetery (1889)
- Memorial to Dr Balfour in Portobello Cemetery (1907)
- Bust of Provost Mackie, Thomas Morton Hall, Leith
