= The Meadows, Edinburgh =

Park in Edinburgh, Scotland

Coordinates: 55°56′28″N 03°11′30″W

Students in the Meadows, Edinburgh

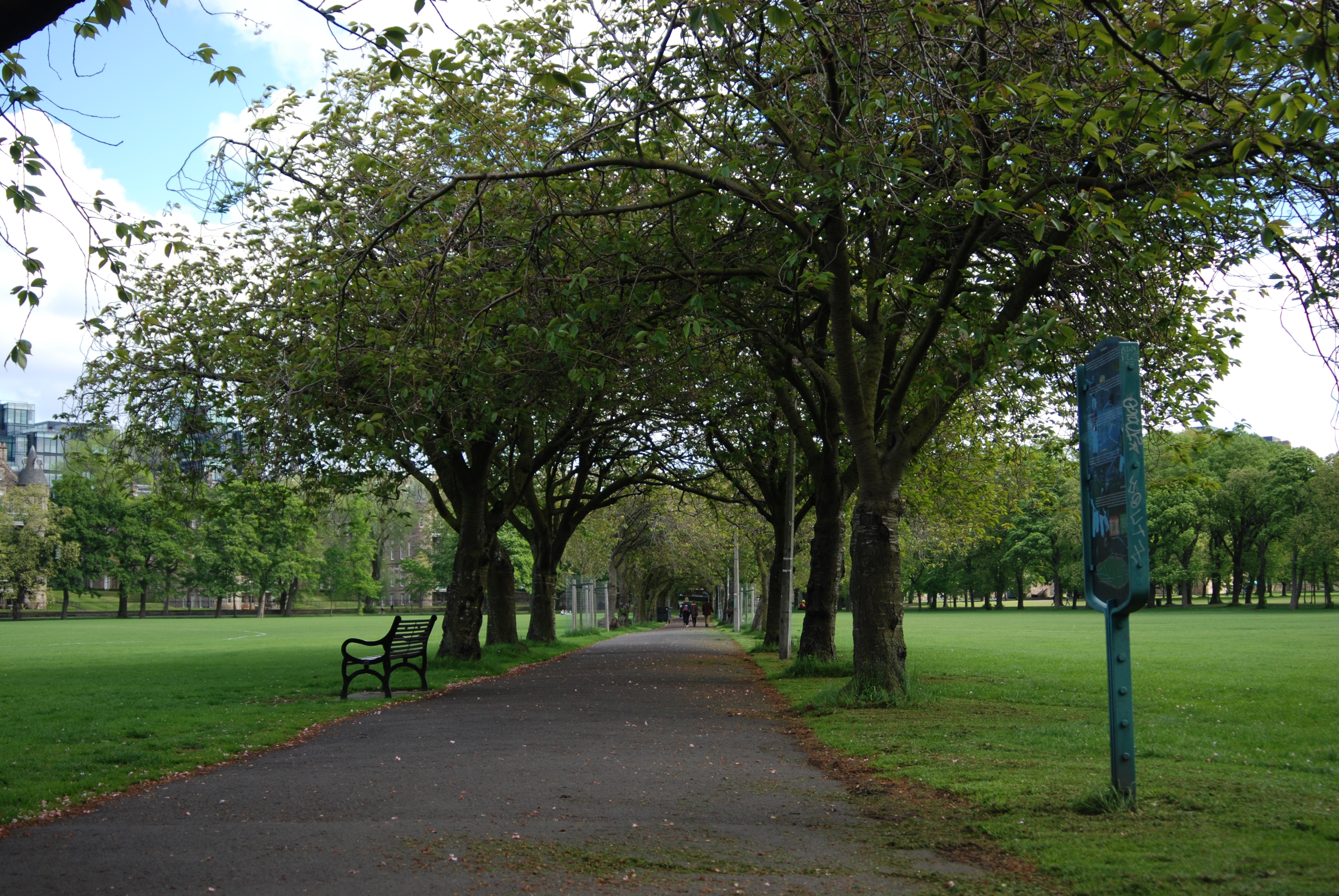
The Meadows

The Meadows is a large public park in Edinburgh, Scotland, to the south of the city centre.

It consists largely of open grassland crossed by tree-lined paths, but also has a children's playground, a croquet club, tennis courts and recreational sport pitches. It is bordered by the University of Edinburgh's George Square campus, the Gordon Aikman Lecture Theatre, the main university library, St Thomas of Aquin's High School and the Quartermile development on the site of the old Edinburgh Royal Infirmary to the north, Marchmont, Summerhall and Sciennes to the south and Newington to the east. To the south-west it becomes Bruntsfield Links where there is a free, public Short Hole Golf Course (pitch and putt).

== History ==
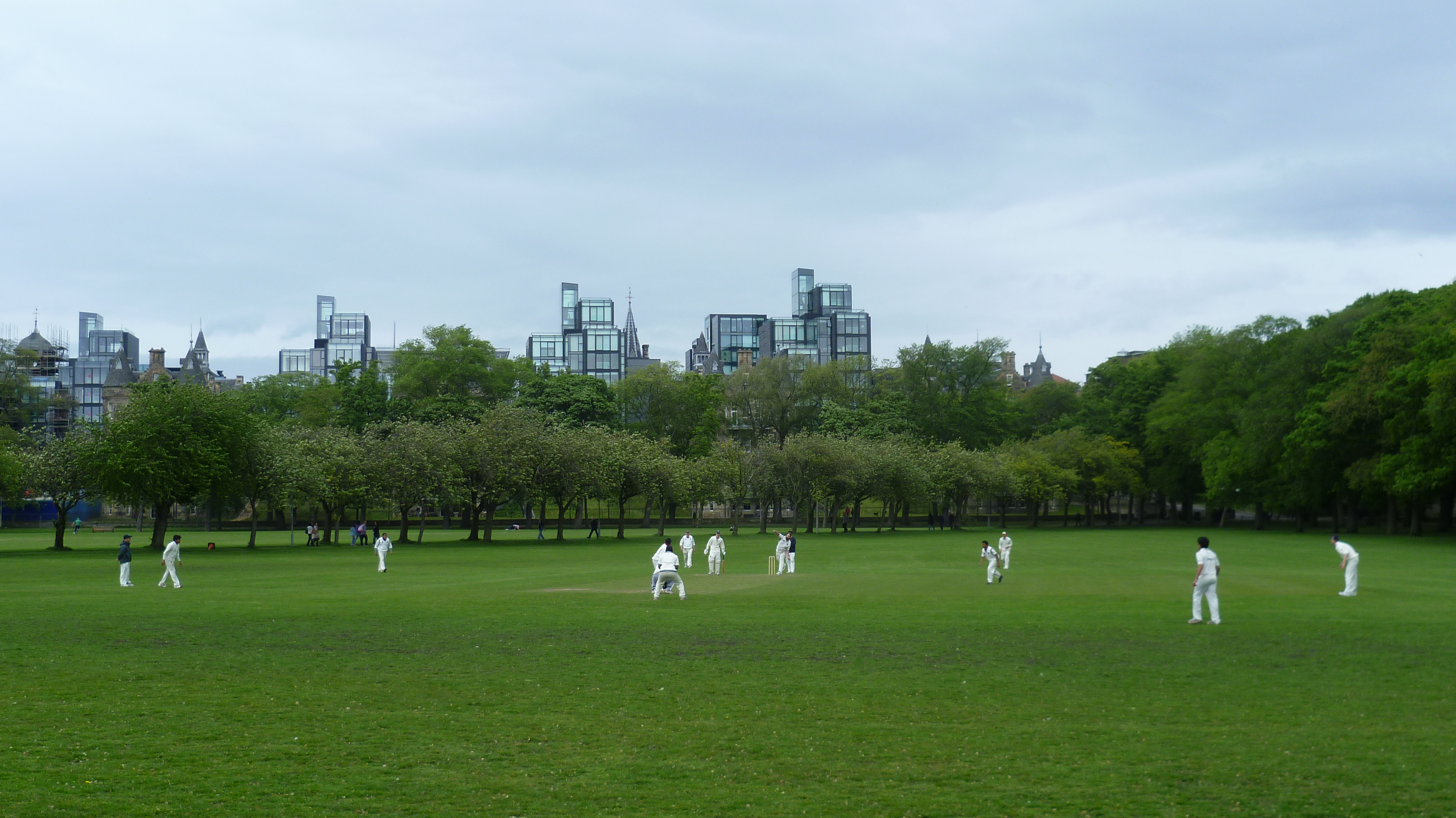
Cricket in the Meadows

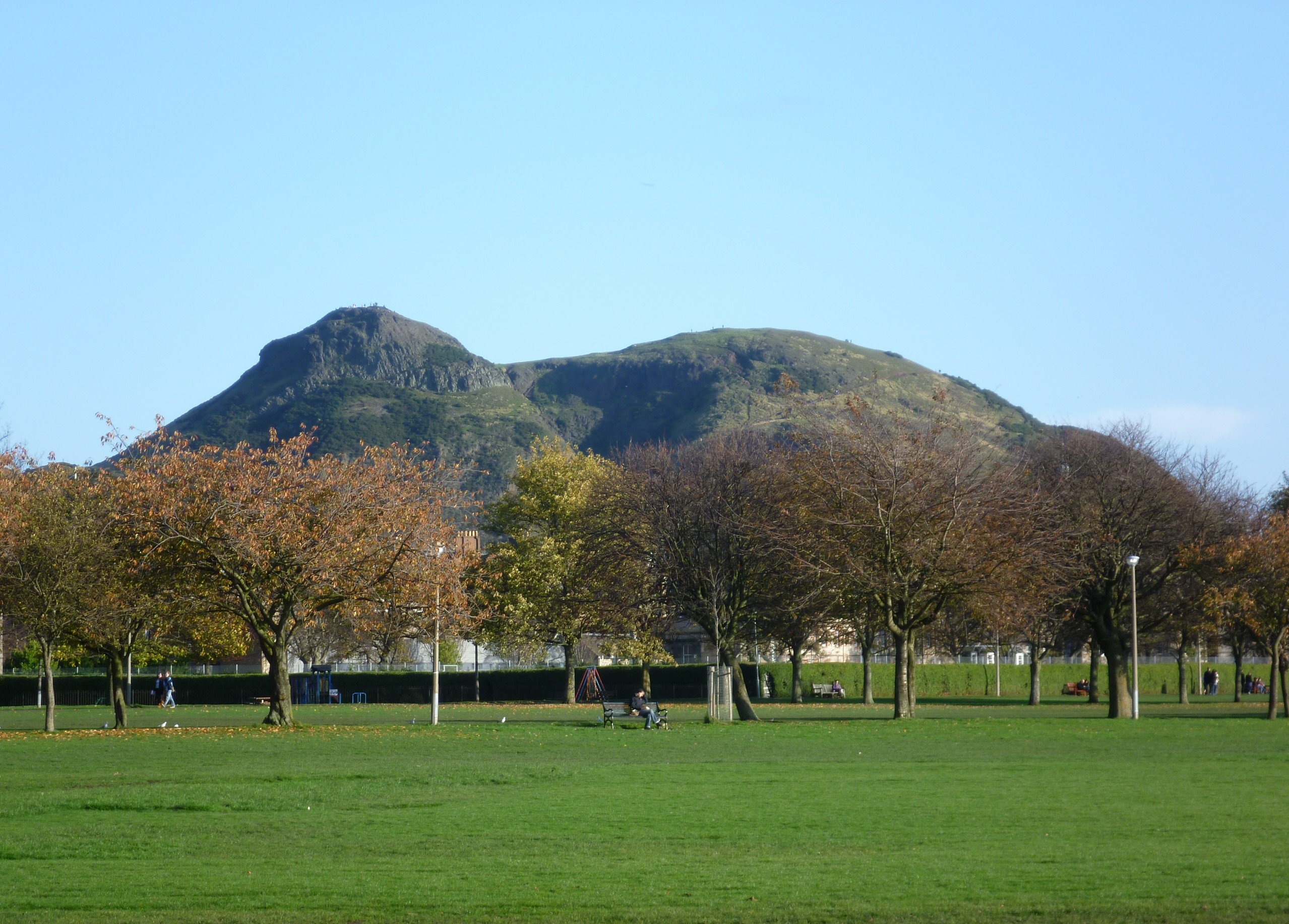
View of Arthur's Seat from the Meadows

The Meadows is historically common land and although now in the care of the council is technically in the ownership of the community itself. It was used for unhindered common grazing until at least 1920 and only with the demise of this need did it become exclusively "a park".

The Meadows originally contained a loch, known as the "burgh loch" or, later, the "South Loch". It covered much of the area bounded in the east by Hope Park Terrace and in the west by the point where Melville Drive becomes Brougham Street, and in the south by Melville Drive and in the north by the site later occupied by the Old Royal Infirmary, a total of 63 acres (250,000 m^{2}). The loch drained from east to west, where the burn known as the Loch-rin was fitted with a sluice gate to prevent the water from draining out. It is from this burn that the street names Lochrin Buildings and Lochrin Place in Tollcross derive. Until Edinburgh's first piped water supply from Comiston arrived in 1621, the loch provided much of the town's drinking water.

It was partially drained in the mid-17th century and for a time named Straiton's Loch or Straiton's Park after the burgess who tried to improve the area. In 1722 Sir Thomas Hope, 8th Baronet Hope of Craighall (c. 1681–1771), an agricultural improver and politician, ordered more drainage work, making the marshy land into a park with a path round the edge, hedges, avenues of lime trees, drainage canals and a summer house. The central tree-lined path known as Middle Meadow Walk followed, and for several decades maps labelled this area as "The Meadows or Hope Park". It is the traditional practice ground of the Royal Company of Archers, whose meeting-place is nearby. In 1827 an Act of Parliament protected the Meadows from being built upon.

Though animals were grazed there and notable Edinburgh citizens are known to have walked there, there was no full right of public access until the middle of the 19th century when new paths were gradually added, criss-crossing the park.

An exception to city council rules against building on the land was allowed for the temporary large glass pavilion of the 1886 International Exhibition of Industry, Science and Art.

A few remnants of the fair remain in place including the Prince Albert Sundial near the west entrance and the Brass Founders' Pillar though the pillar was relocated to Nicolson Square when the exhibition ended.

The whale's jawbones forming an arch over the Meadows path called Jawbone Walk originally formed the display stand of the Zetland and Fair Isle Knitters Association. Having been severely affected by weathering, the Arch was removed in 2014 for restoration. In early 2022 it was announced that the jawbones were too badly damaged to be put back. There was an unsuccessful proposal to create a bronze replica, with the originals displayed indoors in a suitable environment.

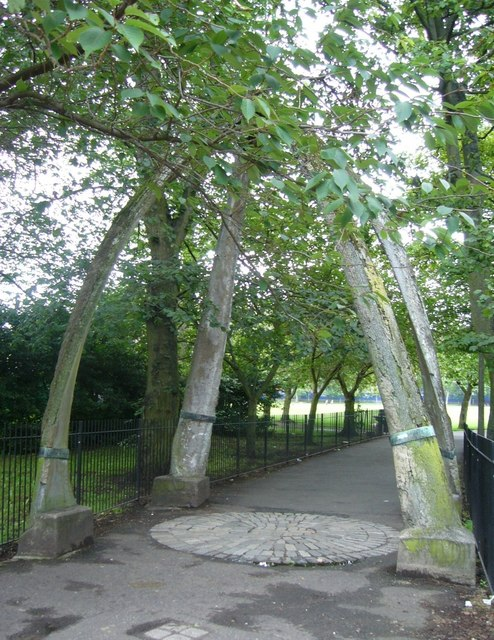
The Jawbone Arch before restoration

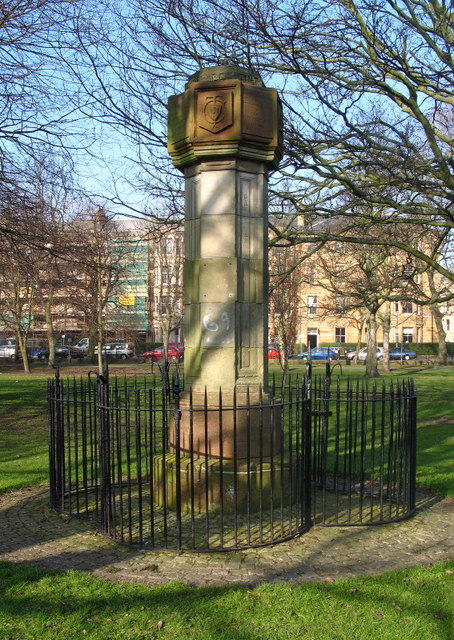
The Prince Albert Sundial

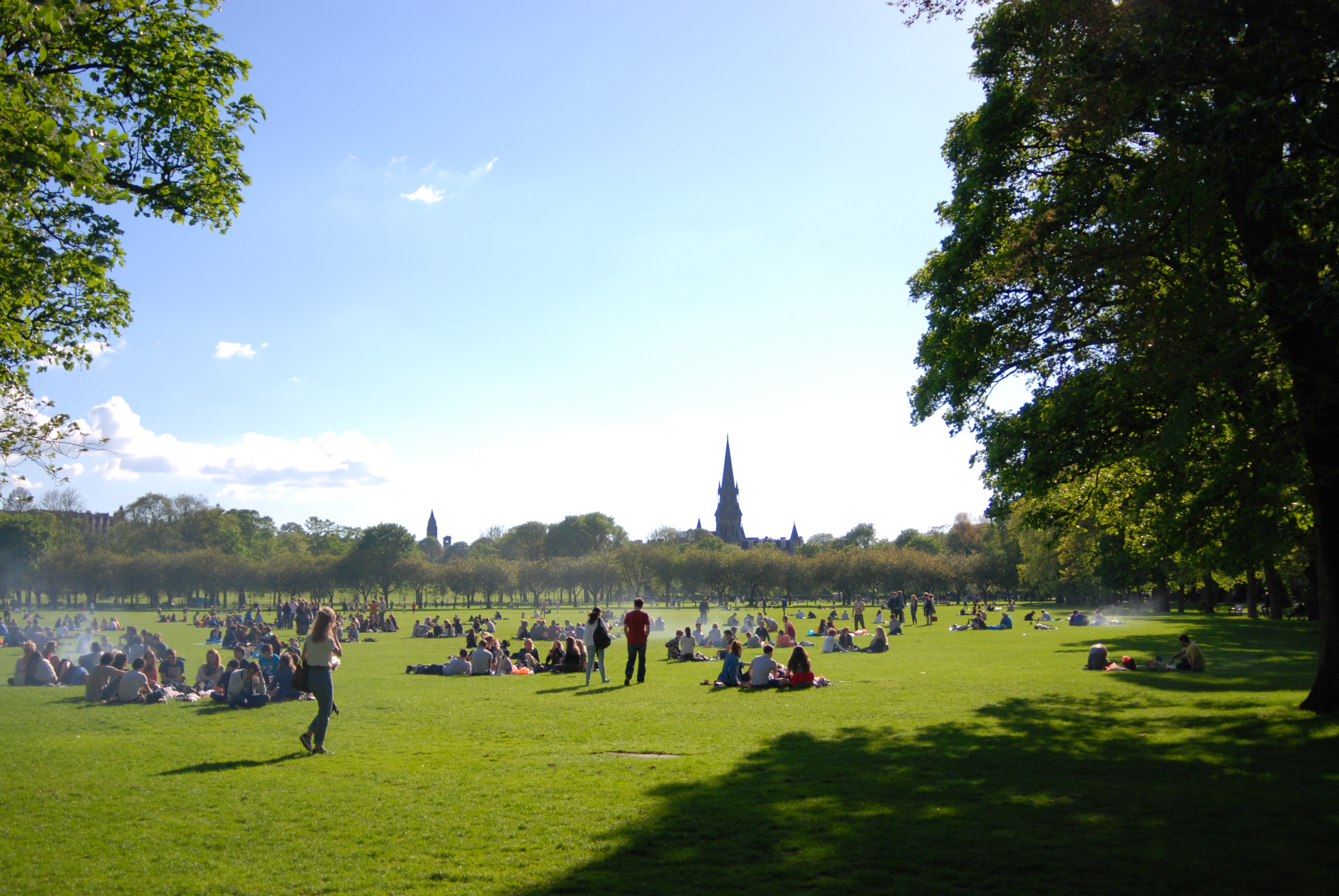
Summer crowd in the Meadows, 2014

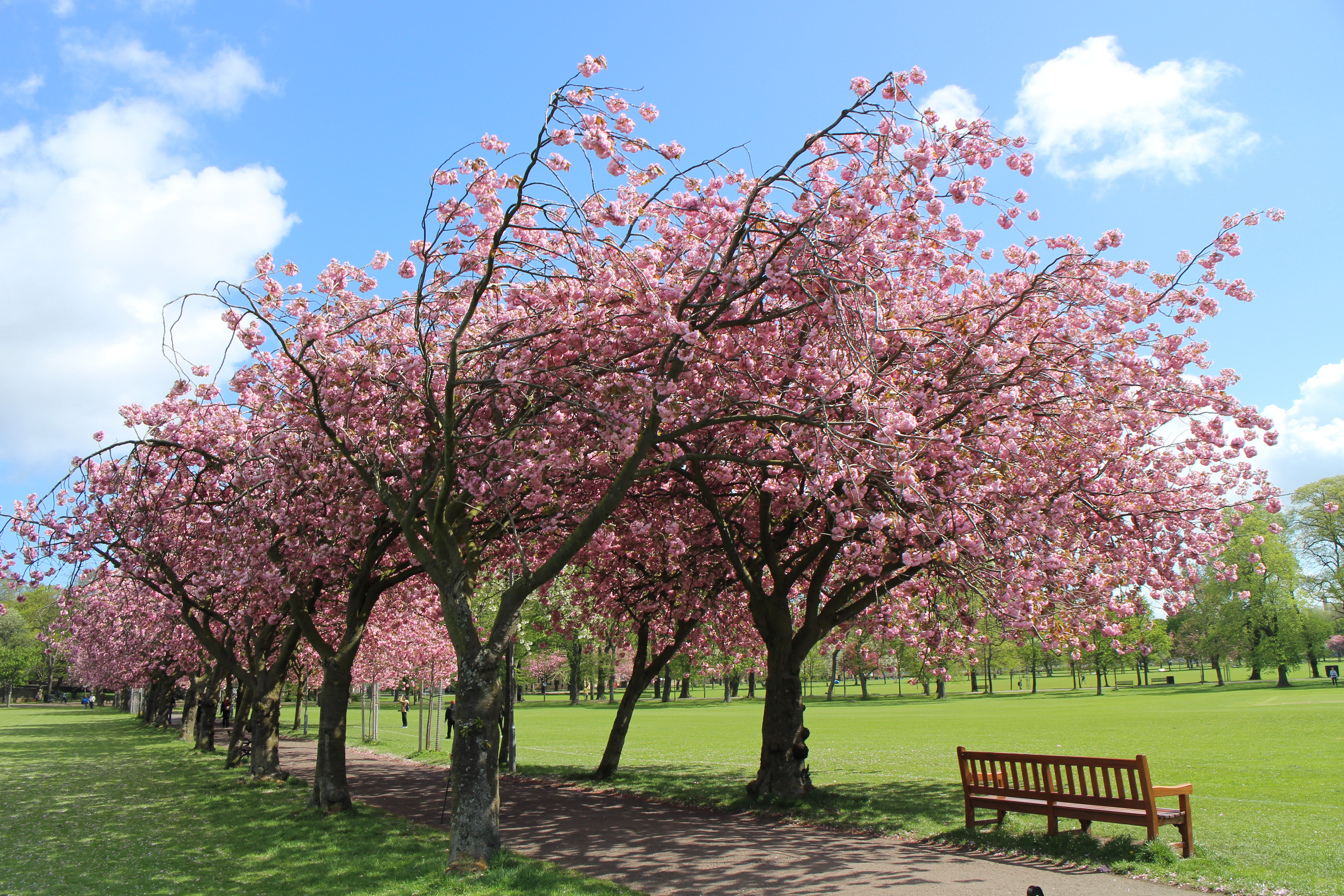
Cherry blossoms in Meadows

In the 1870s the Meadows became an important venue in the early development of football in Edinburgh. Amongst the numerous fledgling teams using the Meadows were Heart of Midlothian (Hearts) and Hibernian, later to become the city's pre-eminent sides, and the first derby match between them was played there on 25 December 1875. Although a modern plaque has been placed near Whalebone Arch to commemorate the event, the main pitch was on the eastern fringe of the park, running from east to west, parallel with the Boroughloch Brewery.

During the Second World War, more than 500 allotments were distributed in the Meadows as part of the Victory garden programme to grow food. They lasted until the 1960s. In the late 1960s, plans to complete a "flyover" over the Meadows for a trunk road were defeated.

== Events ==
The most significant event in the history of the Meadows was the International Exhibition of Industry, Science and Art in 1886, during which a high percentage of the park was built over.

The size and prominence of the park has led to many sporting events being hosted in the summer. Every March, nearly 1,000 runners take part in the annual Meadows Marathon, a charity half marathon and five-kilometre fun run, and, from 2013, a full marathon as well. Between 1975 and 2005 the Meadows Festival was held on the first weekend in June, returning from 2008 onwards. The Meadows Festival is run by a committee of volunteers from the community. Other community groups which have an interest in the park include the Friends of Meadows and Bruntsfield Links, The Scottish Community Safety Network, Parklife and Street Soccer Scotland.

The Meadows is one of the host venues for the Edinburgh Festival, such as the annual Fringe Sunday. It is also the venue for the start and finish of the Edinburgh Moon Walk, an annual event involving 12,000 walkers raising money for breast cancer research and treatment. Being one of the few flat stretches of open land in the central area of the city, it is occasionally host to public protests and rallies, including the 225,000-strong Make Poverty History march on 2 July 2005.

Circuses and funfairs also frequently visit the Meadows around June. In 2013, a giant chess set was placed at the children's play area on the east side. In 2018 the Danish storyteller Svend-Erik Engh held a series of events called Stories under the Tree, storytelling under the Sycamore Tree next to Prince Albert Victor Sundial. These events were inspired by Historier under Bøgen, storytelling in Kings Garden, Copenhagen.

There have been some incidents of crime and anti-social behaviour in the Meadows which have required a police response.

== Botanical ==
The Meadows remains noteworthy for its mature elms, though Dutch elm disease has taken a gradual toll over the years. Most of the survivors (2019) are wych elm and Huntingdon Elm, but there are also specimens of the variable field elm. Some replanting with disease-resistant hybrids like Ulmus 'Regal' and Ulmus 'Columella' has begun.

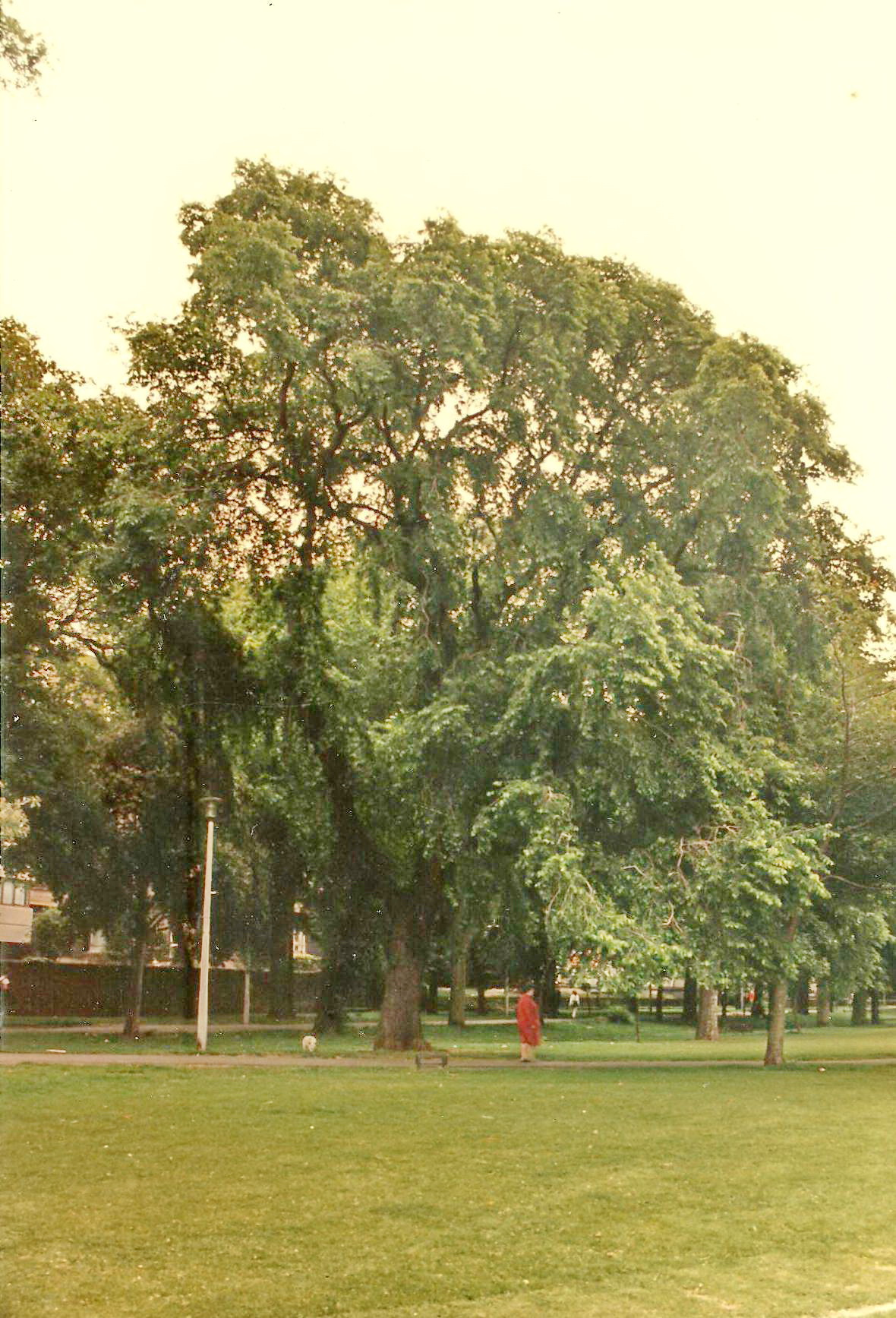
Ulmus japonica by Coronation Walk, The Meadows, 1989

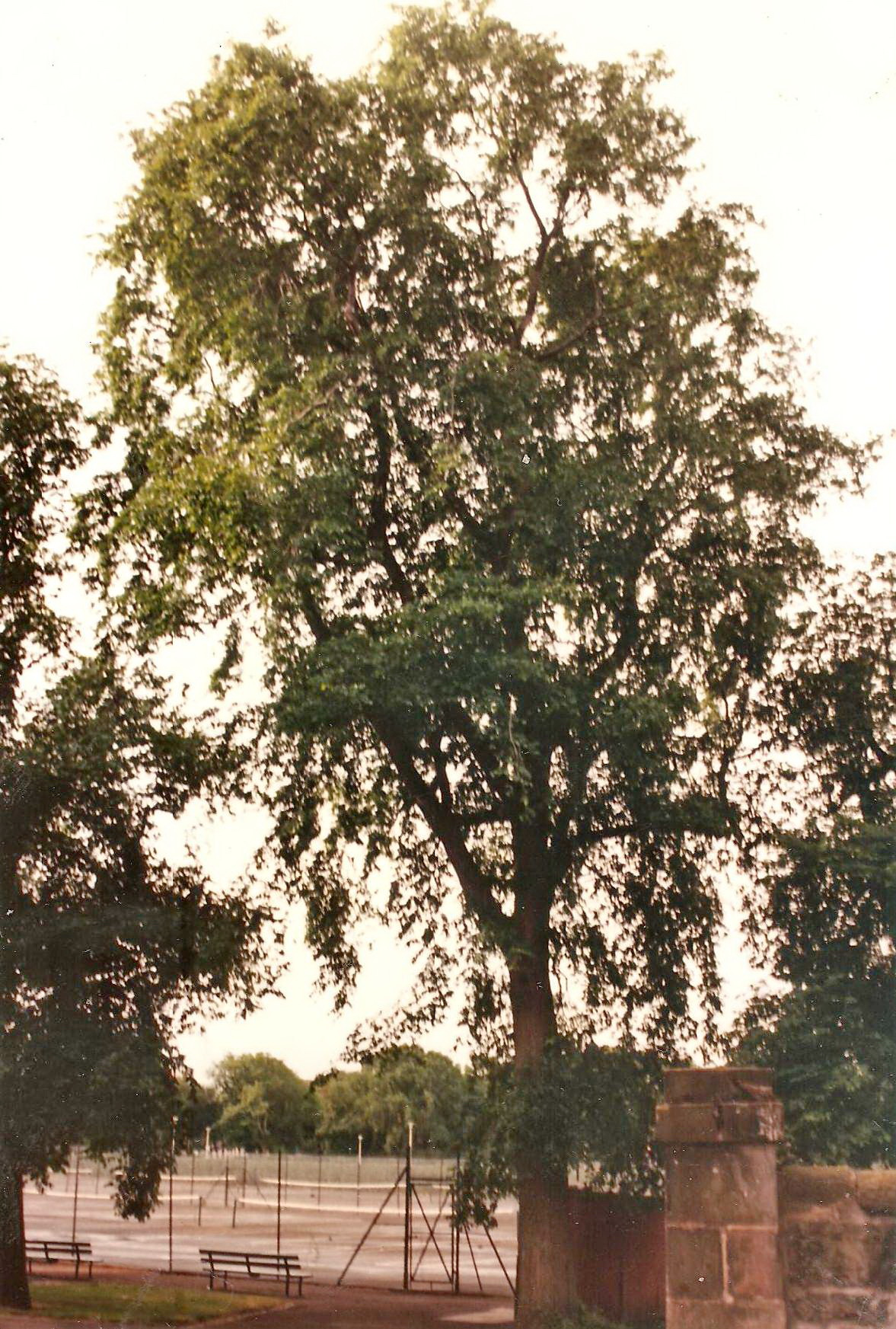
Semi-pendulous Ulmus, form resembling Downton Elm, The Meadows, 1989

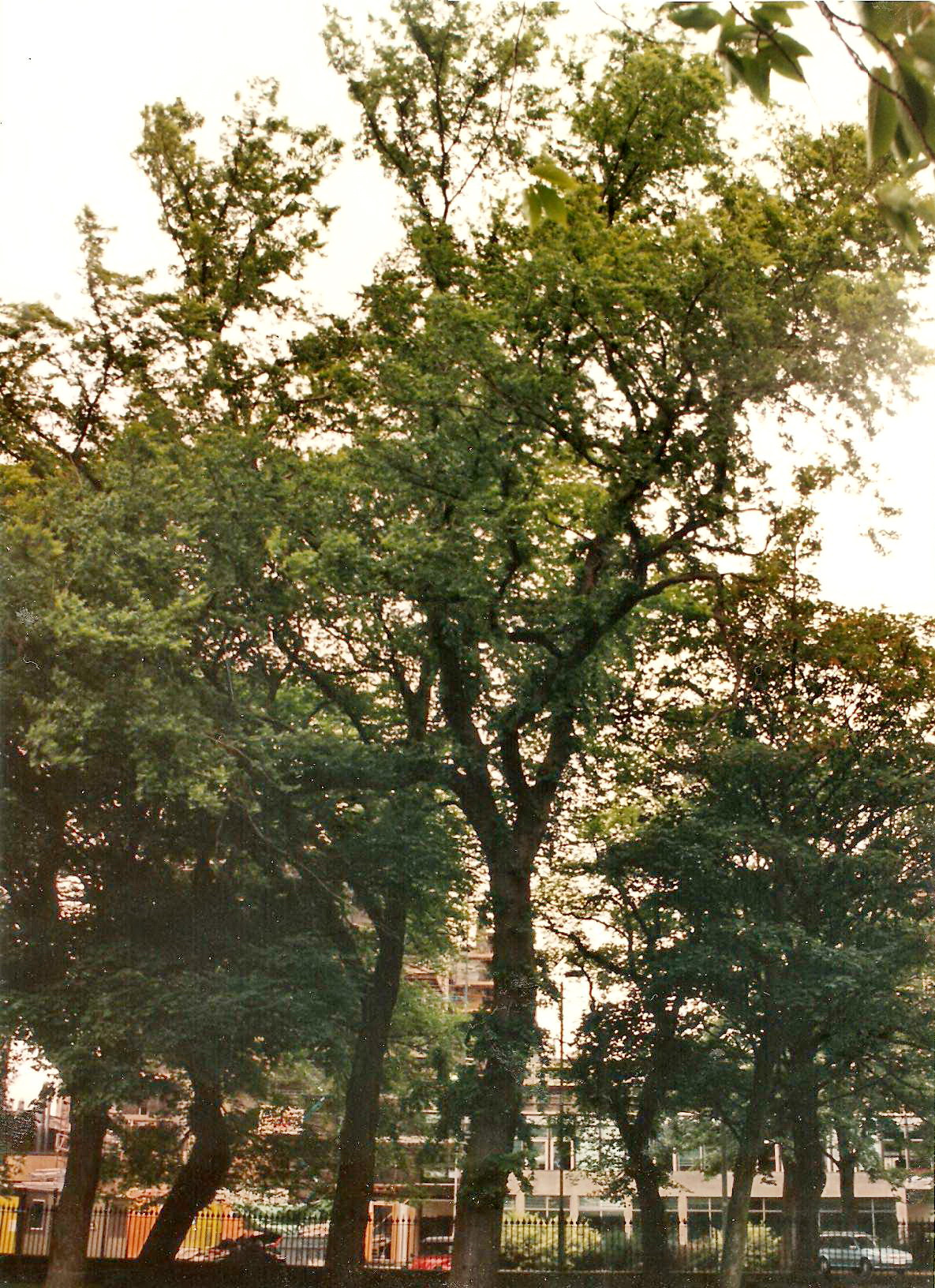
Field elm cultivar 'Pseudo-Viminalis', The Meadows, 1989

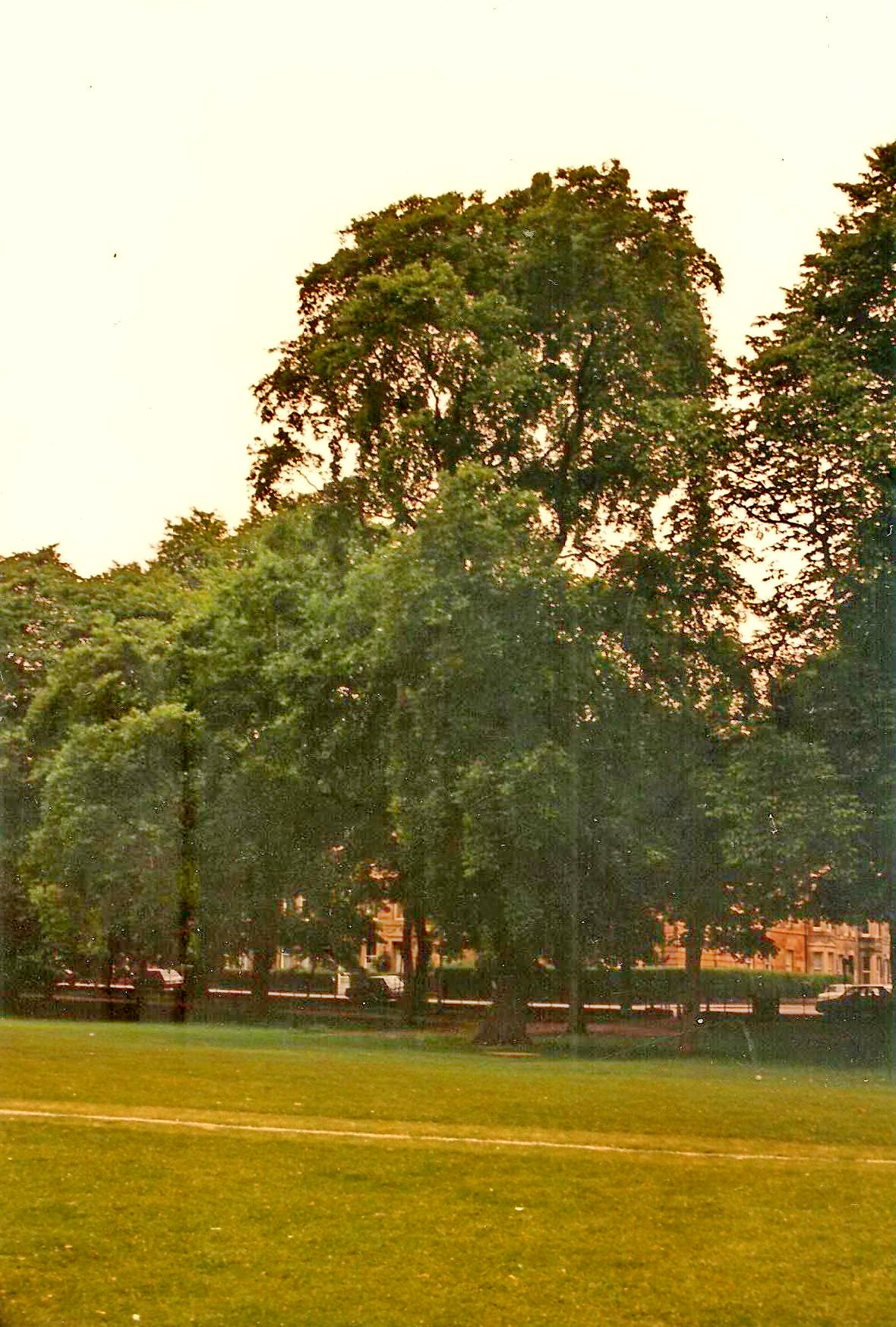
Scotch elm, The Meadows, 1989

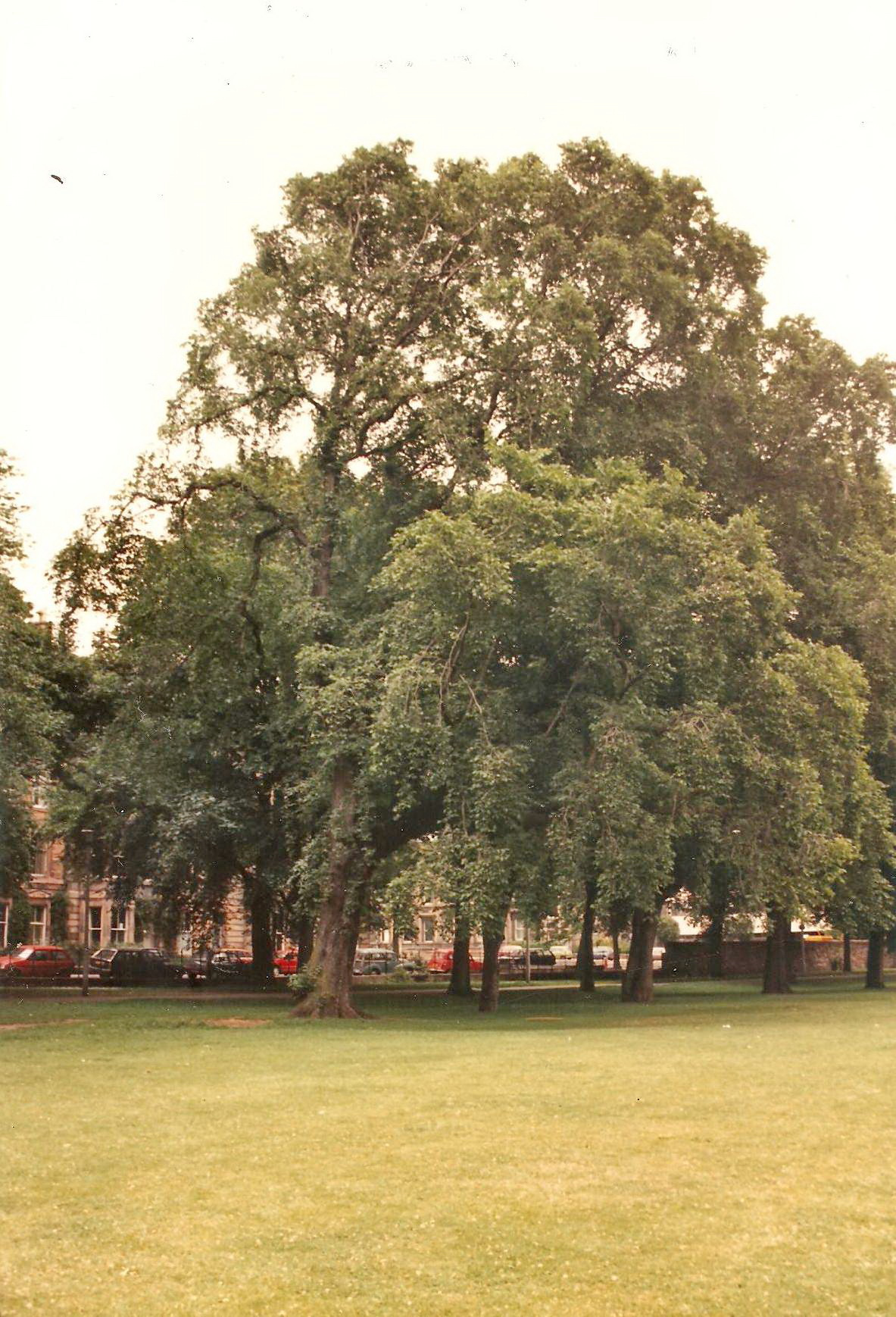
Dutch elm, The Meadows, 1989

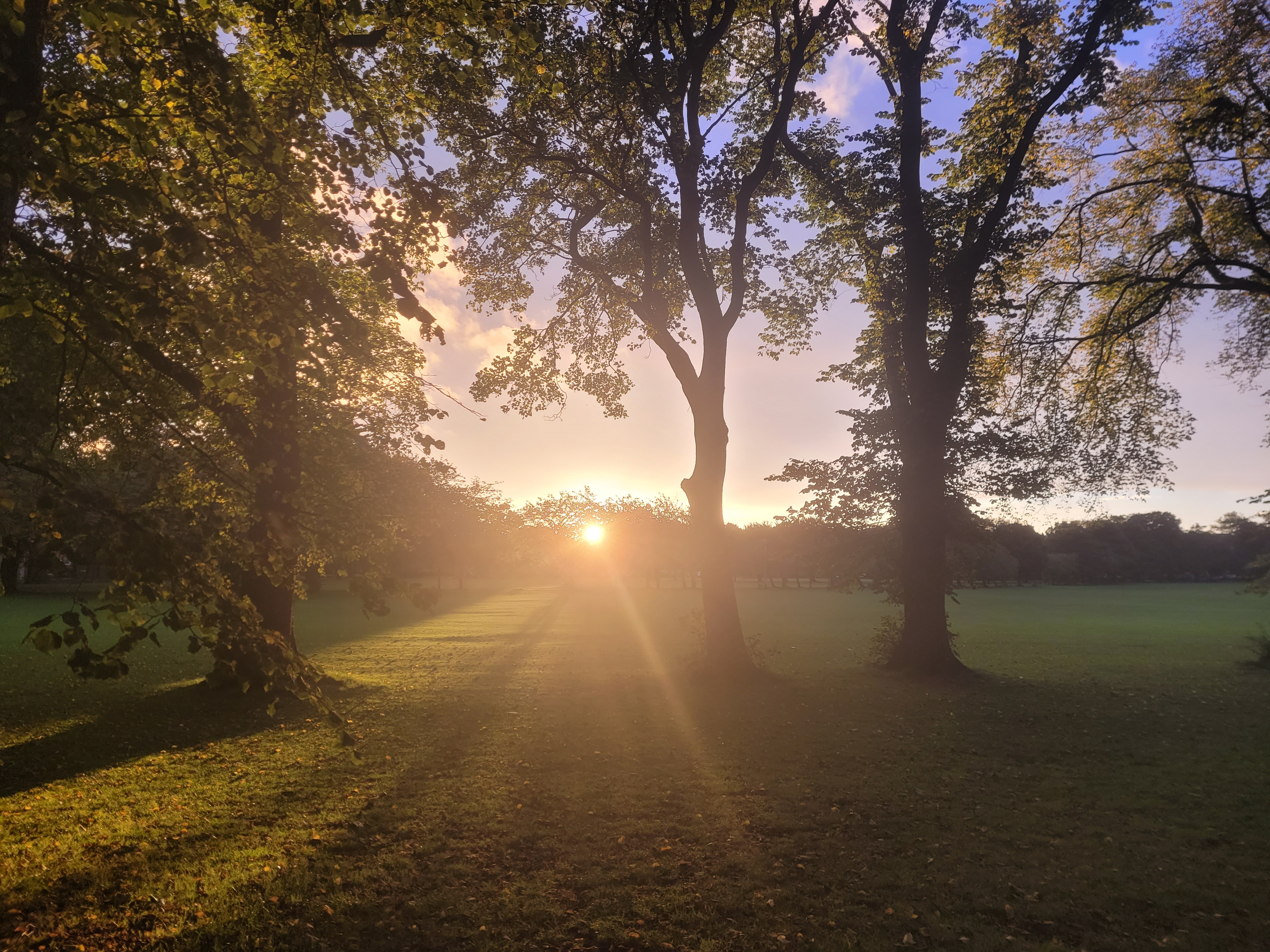
Winter sunrise across the Meadows

== See also ==
- Gogarloch
- Nor Loch
