= Meadows Marathon =

Road running event in Edinburgh, Scotland

- Date: 1st Sunday in March
- Location: Edinburgh, Scotland
- Event type: Circuit
- Distance: Marathon, Half marathon, 10K, 5K
- Established: 2007
- Website: www.meadowsmarathon.org.uk

The Meadows Marathon is a non-profit annual charity marathon, half marathon, 10K and 5K. It is held annually on the first Sunday of March at The Meadows in Edinburgh. It is the largest event organised by the Edinburgh Students' Charities Appeal.

== History ==
The Meadows Marathon is an annual running event founded in 2007 by two students from the University of Edinburgh. With only 250 runners and £10,000 raised in its first year, the marathon has grown considerably in popularity and fundraising since its inception. At the last event, over £35,000 was raised through the participation of 850 runners.

Originally, the Meadows Marathon only offered a half marathon and a fun run, but in 2012 the event was expanded to include a full marathon. Although the event is organized entirely by university students, it has attracted participants from a wide range of backgrounds over the years. The marathon is open to anyone who wishes to take part, regardless of their running experience or background.

== Course ==
The Meadows Marathon is a unique event in the world of running because the course consists of several laps rather than a linear route. The route of the marathon varies from year to year but usually involves between two and eighteen laps of the Meadows, a park in the center of Edinburgh. The multi-lap course allows access to a single water station, which can be easily reached by runners on each lap. Various university clubs contribute to the festive atmosphere of the marathon by providing entertainment along the route for participants and spectators alike. In recent years, the Meadows Marathon route has also been extended to include a section that passes through two other central Edinburgh squares, Bristo Square and George Square.

== Fundraising ==
The Meadows Marathon is a charitable running event where the funds raised by participants are more important than the number of registrations. In addition, the Meadows Marathon promotes a wide range of charitable causes, both locally and internationally. The event encourages participants to raise money for a variety of charities and nonprofits to positively impact the lives of those in need.
