= Robert Rhind =

Scottish footballer

Personal information
- Full name: Robert Rhind
- Place of birth: Scotland
- Position: Inside forward

Senior career*
Years	Team	Apps	(Gls)
1913	Third Lanark		
1913–1920	Queen's Park	16	(4)
- * Club domestic league appearances and goals

Robert Rhind was a Scottish amateur footballer who played as an inside forward in the Scottish League for Queen's Park.

== Personal life ==
Rhind served as a corporal in the Highland Light Infantry during the First World War.

== Career statistics ==
Appearances and goals by club, season and competition
Club	Season	League			Scottish Cup		Other		Total	
Club	Season	Division	Apps	Goals	Apps	Goals	Apps	Goals	Apps	Goals
Queen's Park	1913–14	Scottish First Division	11	2	0	0	0	0	11	2
Queen's Park	1914–15	Scottish First Division	5	2	0	0	1 (Note: Appearance in War Fund Shield)	0	6	2
Career total			16	4	0	0	1	0	17	4
