= Brass Founders' Pillar =

Coordinates: 55°56′46″N 3°11′07″W

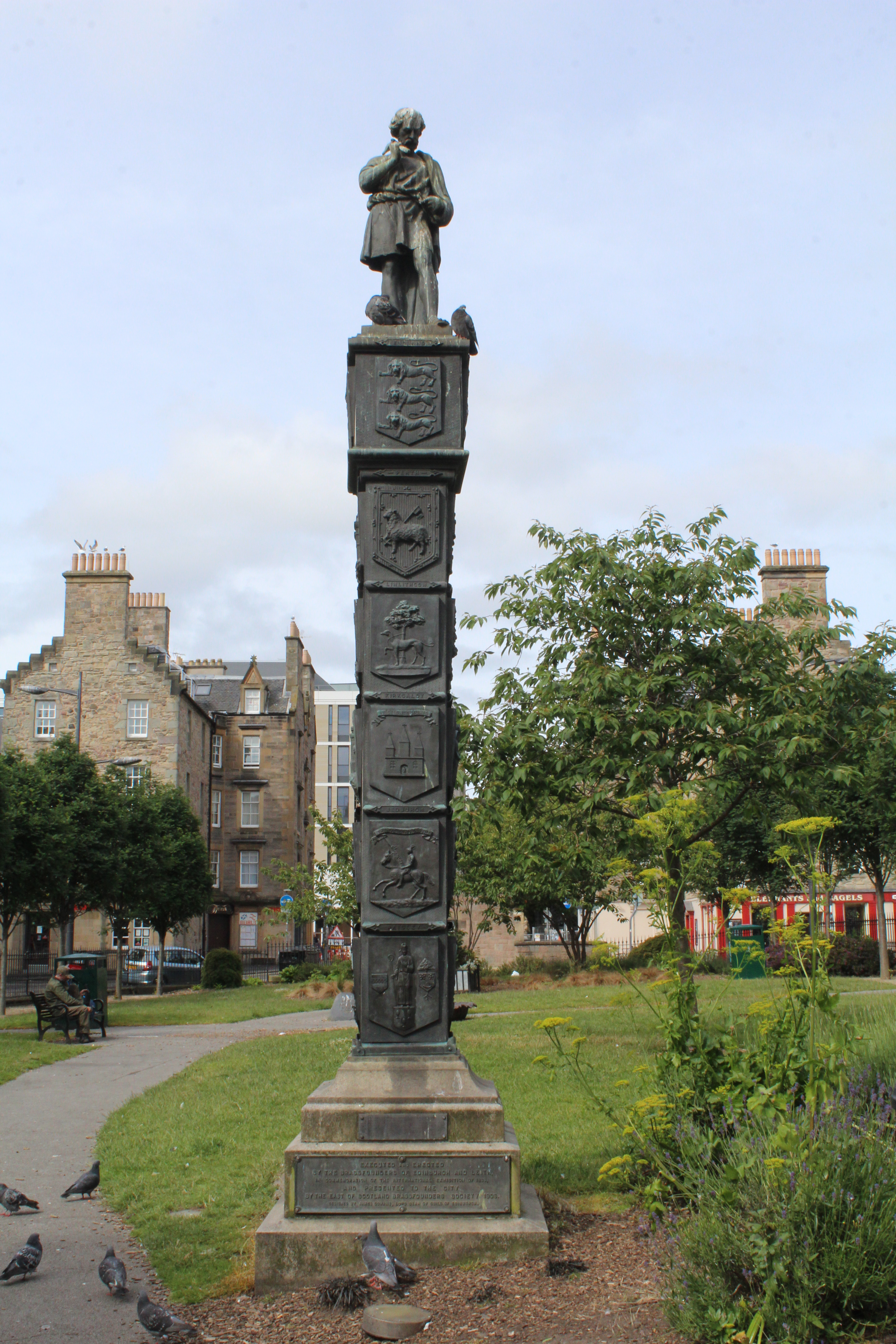
- Brass Founders' Pillar (2018)
- Location: Nicolson Square, Edinburgh, Scotland, United Kingdom
- Designer: James Gowans; John Stevenson Rhind (statue)
- Material: Bronze; Granite (base)
- Dedicated date: 1886
- Dedicated to: Brassfounders

The Brass Founders' Pillar, also known as the Brassfounders Column, is a monumental column in Edinburgh, Scotland.

== History ==
The column was designed by James Gowans as the showpiece for the Brassfounders' Guild of Edinburgh and Leith for the International Exhibition of Industry, Science and Art, a world's fair held in Edinburgh in 1886. The statue at the top of the statue depicts Tubal-cain and was designed by John Stevenson Rhind. At the fair, the column won a gold medal. Following the fair, the monument was moved to Nicolson Square in Edinburgh, where it still stands. In 2008, the square and column underwent slight restoration.

== Design ==
The monument consists of a granite base with a bronze square shaft consisting of six tiers. Each tier shows a heraldic coat of arms. The bronze statue of Tubal-cain on top of the shaft is in reference to his description in the Book of Genesis as being the first metalsmith. A bronze plaque attached to the base reads:

Executed and Erected by the Brassfounders of Edinburgh and Leith in Commemoration of the International Exhibition of 1886 and Presented to the City by the East of Scotland Brassfounders Society, 1909. Designed by James Gowans, Lord Dean of Guild of Edinburgh.

== See also ==
- 1886 in art
