= International Exhibition of Industry, Science and Art =

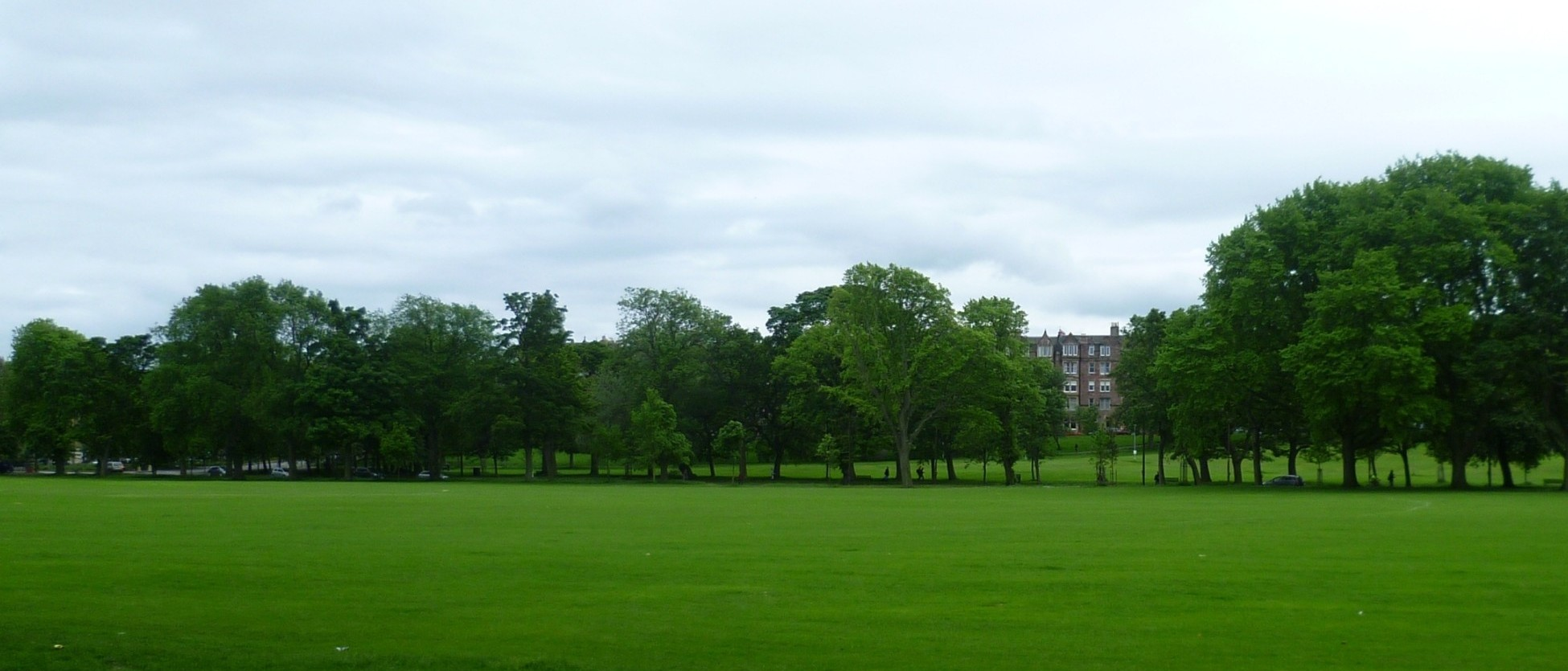
- The Meadows

Overview
- BIE-class: Unrecognized exposition
- Name: International Exhibition of Industry, Science and Art
- Area: 30 acres
- Visitors: 2,770,000

Location
- Country: United Kingdom
- City: Edinburgh
- Venue: The Meadows

Timeline
- Opening: 6 May 1886
- Closure: 30 October 1886

The International Exhibition of Industry, Science and Art was a World's fair held in Edinburgh, Scotland in 1886.

== Summary ==
The exhibition was held in The Meadows. It was opened on 6 May by Prince Albert Victor and ran to 30 October, occupied 30 acres, had 2,770,000 visits and made £5,555 profit.

== Exhibits ==
Exhibits included an Old Edinburgh Street exhibit which included reconstructions of, by then, demolished buildings of the Royal Mile including the Netherbow Port; Czech violins; Turkish embroidery; and Scotch whisky. Neilson and Company of Glasgow exhibited the Caledonian Railway Single steam locomotive.

Perth's Magnus Jackson was awarded the bronze medal and diploma of merit for his photographs of ferns and foxgloves.

== Legacy ==
The Zetland and Fair Isle exhibit gave Edinburgh city whale jawbones that formed an arch on Jawbone Walk. The jawbones were removed for restoration in 2014 due to deterioration and lack of maintenance. In 2022 they were deemed too fragile to put back and a suitable replacement has yet to be agreed.

The Brass Founders' Pillar from the Exhibition was moved from the Meadows to Nicolson Square after the event ended.

The Prince Albert Victor Sundial still sits near the west entrance to the park.

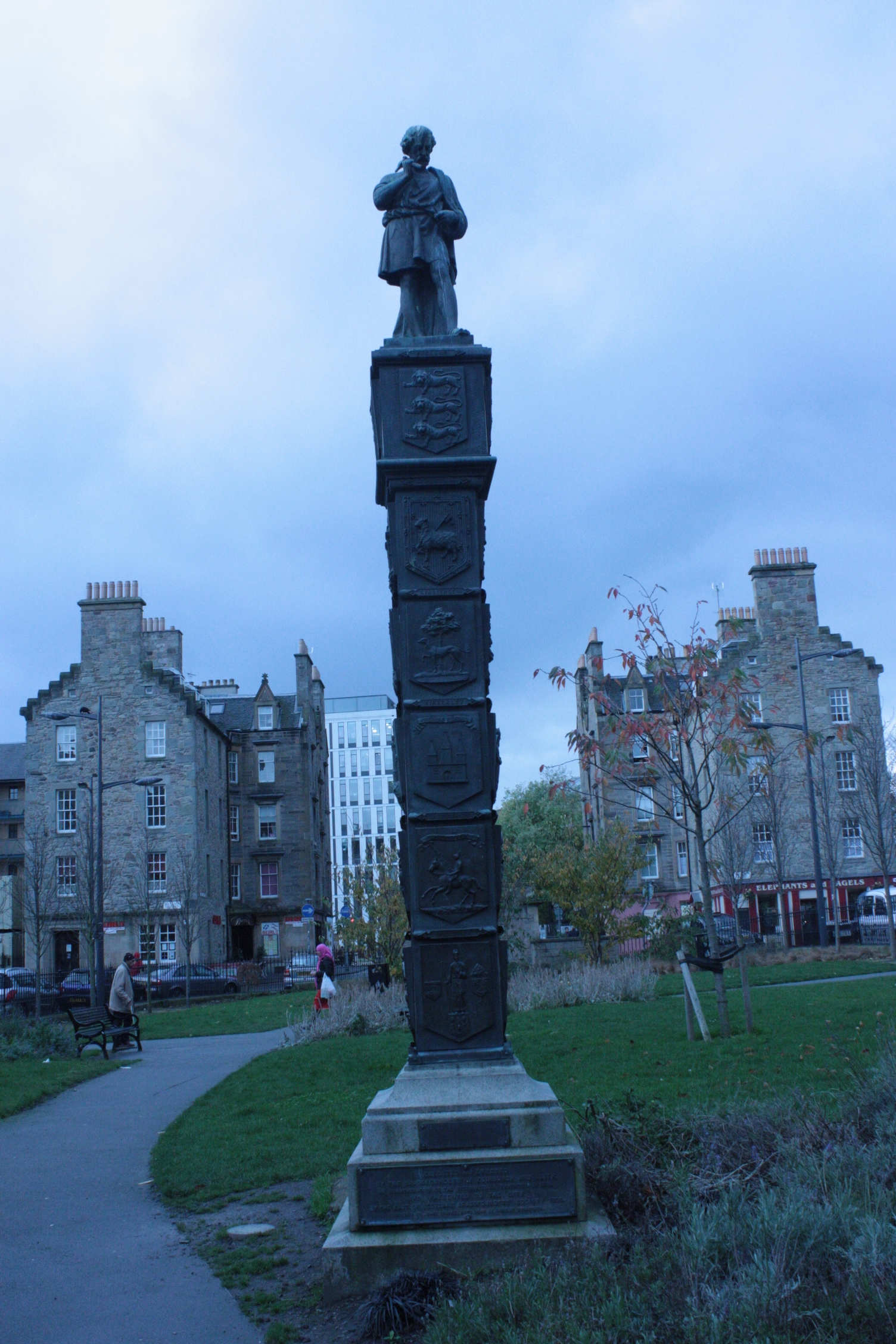
The Brass Founders' Pillar from the Edinburgh International Exhibition

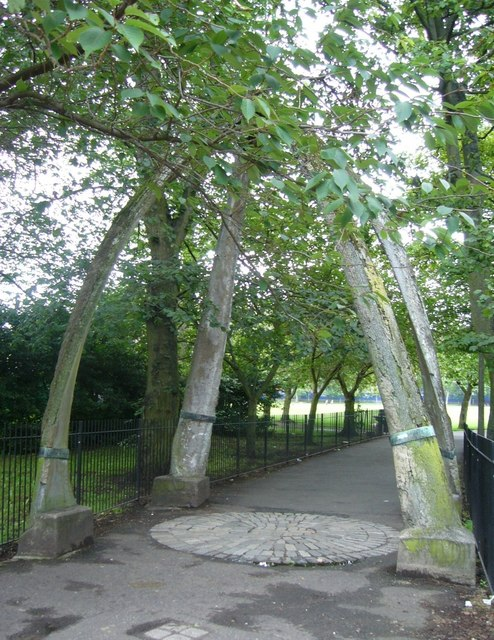
Jawbone Arch before removal

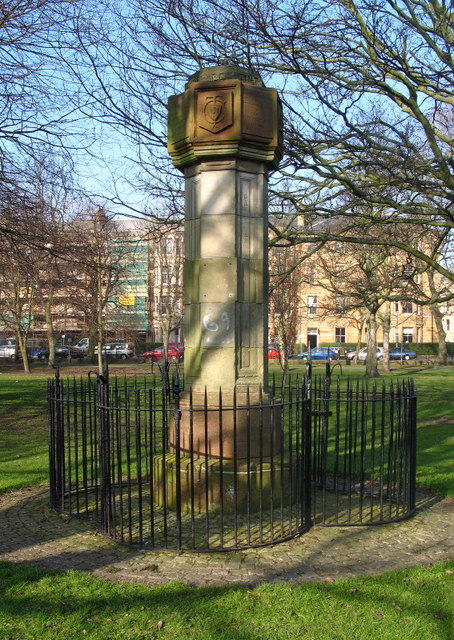
The Prince Alber Victor Sundial

== See also ==
- Edinburgh Exhibition Cup § 1886, football matches played during the exhibition
- International Exhibition of Science, Art & Industry, similar event in 1890
- Edinburgh International Exhibition Tournament a series three tennis events held indoors and outdoors in 1886.
