= Barbara Steel =

Scottish social activist

Barbara Steel OBE
- Lady Barbara, circa 1935
- Born: Barbara Joanna Paterson; 1857; St John's Town of Dalry, Kirkcudbrightshire, Scotland
- Died: 1943 (aged 85–86); Pietermaritzburg, South Africa
- Other name: Lady Steel
- Occupation: Suffragette
- Years active: 1883–1930
- Spouse: James Steel

Barbara Steel (OBE; 1857 – 22 December 1943) was a Scottish social activist who actively campaigned for Women's Suffrage in both the United Kingdom and South Africa. She was the first woman to stand in an election for the Edinburgh Town Council, when she ran in the 1907 election. Steel moved to South Africa in 1911 and at the beginning of World War I founded an organization to provide aid to South African soldiers and their families. She was honored as an Officer in the Order of the British Empire for her civil service. In addition, she served as president of the Women's Enfranchisement Association of the Union from 1916 until 1930, fighting for women's right to vote in South Africa.

== Early life ==
Barbara Joanna Paterson was born in 1857 in St John's Town of Dalry, Kirkcudbrightshire, Scotland to Jane S. and Rev. Alexander A. Paterson. Her father was a United Presbyterian minister and her oldest brother James Alexander later became a professor of Hebrew and Old Testament Exegesis at New College, Edinburgh. She was raised and attended school in Dalry until the 1880s, when she moved with her brother, James, to Newington, Edinburgh, where she continued her education. On 4 August 1883, Paterson married James Steel, a builder and property developer in Edinburgh. They made their home at 32 Colinton Road, Edinburgh, from the time of their marriage until James' death on 4 September 1904.

== Activism ==
James was elected to local politics beginning in 1872, serving as the Liberal Councillor for the George Square Ward. From 1888 he served as Bailie and became Lord Provost of Edinburgh in 1900, serving until his retirement in 1903. From May 1903, when her husband was raised to the baronetcy of Murieston, Mid-Calder, Steel became known as Lady Steel. James was a property developer and built hundreds of buildings throughout the city. Steel was involved, like many women of her class, in social improvement projects. She encouraged James to build sanitary flats with indoor plumbing and potable water for the poor and working classes. Many of these apartments, located throughout the city in neighborhoods like Comely Bank, Dalry, Gorgie, Haymarket, Murieston Park, and Tollcross, had fixed rents.

After her husband's death, Lady Steel became more involved in women's issues. Between 1904 and 1906, she served on the executive committee of the Scottish Women's Liberal Federation (SWLF), a women's branch of the Scottish Liberal Party. She also served on the Local Government and Women's Franchise committees of the SWLF and was a member of the Edinburgh National Society of Woman Suffrage. Lady Steel made international headlines from England to Australia and the United States in March 1907, when she refused to pay taxes without being allowed to vote. Her furniture was seized and sold to pay her tax bill. The same month, she led a protest at the Mercat Cross to demand women's suffrage. Later that same year, in October, she ran in the first town council meeting in which women were allowed to contest. On the eve of the election, a poem "The Suffragette's Nut Cracked" showing the conflict over votes for women and Steel's candidacy was published in the Edinburgh Evening Dispatch. Though she did not win a seat in the November election, because of her militant stance on taxation, she is remembered as "the first woman to stand for election to Edinburgh Town Council".

In 1908 and again in 1909, Lady Steel continued her stance of refusing to pay taxes. By 1908, she was a member and one of the speakers for the Women's Social and Political Union's Edinburgh branch and participated in a discussion held at Bridge of Allan with Elizabeth Wolstenholme Elmy, Chrystal Macmillan and Jessie Methven about women's suffrage and higher education for women. In June 1908, she attended the Fourth Conference of the International Woman Suffrage Alliance held in Amsterdam, as one of the alternate delegates. On 9 October 1909, she participated in the Great Procession and Women's Demonstration held in Edinburgh in support of women's enfranchisement.

In March 1911, Lady Steel married Lt. Col. James Hyslop, D.S.O., and moved with him to his home in Pietermaritzburg, in the newly formed Union of South Africa. Hyslop was a fellow Scotsman from Kirkcudbrightshire, who had moved to the Colony of Natal in 1881 and worked there as a pioneer in mental health and as a military physician. At the onset of World War I, he became the director of medical services in the South African Medical Corps. She served as the founder and chair of the Women's Patriotic League of Natal Province during the war. The organization served to support South African troops and provide necessary services for their families, such as medical supplies and clothing, to prevent over-taxing British organizations providing service in Europe. In 1918, she was honored as an Officer in the Order of the British Empire for her service.

In 1916, she became the second president of the Women's Enfranchisement Association of the Union (WEAU), replacing Mary Emma Macintosh, who had recently died. The WEAU initially was formed on the advice on Carrie Chapman Catt in 1911 as an alternative to the Women's Enfranchisement League (WEL). The WEL had been divided by factionalism over the subject of race and Catt believed that the issue of race would delay granting women's suffrage. On her advice, the WEAU decided to ignore the issue of universal suffrage for all races, actively working only for the vote of white women. Lady Steel held the post of president from 1916 to 1930, when white women in South Africa finally secured enfranchisement.

== Death and legacy ==
She died on 22 December 1943 at Pietermaritzburg and was buried at Stellawood Cemetery, in Durban, South Africa. In 2009, her role in the Scottish suffrage movement was celebrated along with other activists in the reenactment "Gude Cause" of the 1909 demonstration of Edinburgh.
