= Feminism in South Africa =

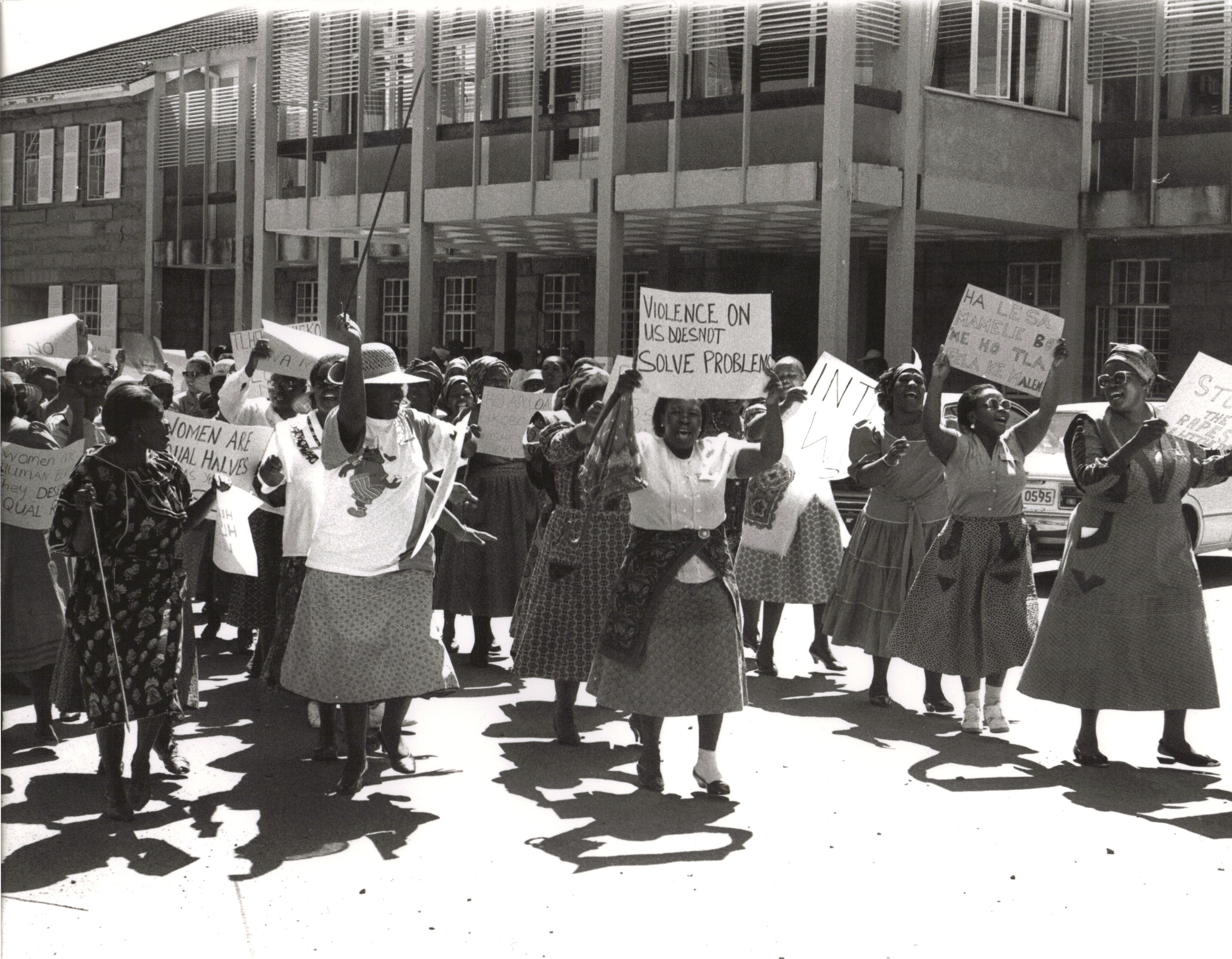
South Africa celebrates National Women's Day on August 9th.

Feminism in South Africa concerns the organised efforts to improve the rights of the girls and women of South Africa. These efforts are largely linked to issues of feminism and gender equality on one hand, and racial equality and the political freedoms of African and other non-White South African ethnic groups on the other. Early feminist efforts concerned the suffrage of White women, allowing them to vote in elections beginning from 1930s, and significant activism in the 1950s to demand equal pay of men and women. The 1980s were a major turning point in the advancement of South African women, and in 1994, following the end of the apartheid regime, the status of women was bolstered by changes to the country's constitution. Since the end of apartheid, South African feminism is a contribution associated with the liberation and democratization of the country; however, the movement still struggles with the embedded conservative and patriarchal views within some segments of South African society.

== History ==
=== Overview ===
Feminism in South Africa has been shaped by struggles for political and racial equality, as well as by national and transnational struggles for gender equality. Women in South Africa have historically faced a myriad of state-facilitated and socially-practiced discrimination, including pay discrimination. One example was the inability of all women to vote until 1983, and cultural sexism manifesting through severe violence against women. South Africa has high rates of rape and domestic violence, which frequently go unreported. Nearly one third of adolescent girls report being sexually coerced by men by the time they turn 16. This statistic leads to high rates of sexual harassment and assault experienced by women.

In response to these issues and amid the political instability of the 1980s, feminism in South Africa gained traction as women became more politically active. Specifically, feminism in South Africa gained new life in 1994 when the constitution was being rewritten to cater to a post-apartheid, democratic society. During this phase of reconstruction, women unified and lobbied for a more equitable positioning of women within the constitutional framework. Women benefited from the democratization of South Africa, as women were the ones most significantly impacted and oppressed by the male-dominated state repression. It was the initial unification and women's rights movement during the negotiations of the constitution that spurred other activism related to women's rights and social circumstances. These progressive, women-led movements were later identified as among the earliest examples of modern South African feminism. The 1990s South African feminist movement was also propelled forward by the momentum of other noteworthy women's rights movements in neighboring African countries. Countries such as Zimbabwe and Mozambique served as inspiration, as women in both successfully organized and lobbied to make women's needs a concern of the state.

Through the country's transition to multi-racial democracy in the mid-1990s, South African feminism contributed to the process of reconstruction, striving for a non-racist, non-sexist society. However, feminist activism and radical transformational politics were largely diluted in the process. Contemporary South African feminism continues to engage with questions of the role of feminism within broader national and international struggles for class and racial equality. South African feminism aligns with the agenda of global feminism as a continuous project designed to deconstruct and challenge the dualities and binaries between men and women in the eyes of society and the state. Feminism in South Africa is rooted in distinct epistemologies and beliefs about women and women's work that differ from those that ground other modern inequitable social structures, such as workers' compensation. International feminist theory asserts that exclusive dualities between men and women serve as the grounds on which discriminatory laws and practices lie. Modern South African feminists aim to deconstruct these dualities by politicizing the lives of women and demanding gender equality laws.

=== Women's suffrage and civic engagement ===
In South Africa, the struggle for women's suffrage began in 1889 and was primarily led by the Women's Enfranchisement Association of the Union. White women were given the right to vote by the Women's Enfranchisement Act, 1930. The first general election at which women could vote was the 1933 election. Due to the patriarchal structure embedded in South Africa's cultural norms and governing bodies, women have faced adversity in the fight for equality, particularly women of color who, because of the unique racial history of the country, have faced even greater disadvantages due to apartheid. Asian and women of color in South Africa gained suffrage in 1983, more than five decades after suffrage was granted to white women .

In 1933, Leila Wright, wife of Deneys Reitz, was elected as the first female Member of Parliament.

The Black Sash organisation was founded in the 1950s, initially titled the Women's Defence of the Constitution League but eventually shortened by the press to the Black Sash because of the women's habit of wearing black sashes at their protest meetings. In this period, Black Sash members campaigned against the removal of Coloured or mixed race voters from the voters' roll in the Cape Province by the National Party government. As the apartheid system began to reach into every aspect of South African life, Black Sash members demonstrated against the Pass Laws and the introduction of other apartheid legislation. It would later open Advice Offices to provide information concerning their legal rights to non-white South African's affected by that legislation.

On May 2, 1990, the African National Congress released a statement titled "The Statement of the National Executive Committee of the African National Congress on the Emancipation of Women in South Africa", which was the first national acknowledgment of the need for gender equity to advance a genuinely democratic nation. The statement also recognized that there was a striking imbalance of women in government positions, and that is detrimental as women's perspectives and issues are often overlooked. The document initially received high praise from feminists in South Africa, but in subsequent years, women criticized the congress for failing to take action to address the issues outlined in the statement. However, since 1990, women have gained more positions of power within government, and today South Africa is ranked among the top five African countries that have high representation of women in the national legislature. This improvement is primarily due to mandatory quotas now required by political parties in South Africa to ensure minimum female representation in government positions.

=== Equal pay ===
Because the pay structure was based on nuclear-family ideals, men were assumed to be the primary earners for the household, and all wages women earned were supplementary to the family's income. The nuclear family structure is becoming less common among South African families as more women & men opt out of marriage and divorce rates rise, leaving single-income homes.

Although it is illegal in South Africa to pay either gender more or less for the same work per hour or per annum, women are choosing career fields that are devalued in compensation, leaving a general pay gap between men and women. Equal pay in South Africa has already been recognized in theory, although not in practice. Women in high-earning fields, on average, work fewer hours than their male counterparts due to the long-standing burden of shouldering the majority of childcare and other family responsibilities. This pay gap is the legacy of generations of gender disparities, and women are making advancements steadily, dominating specific STEM fields such as Biology, Botany & Statistics for decades.

In 2017, the World Economic Forum estimated that the estimated earned income (Purchasing Power Parity) in South Africa for women was US$9,938 while for men it was US$16,635. In South Africa, the proportion of unpaid work, also known as parental or adult responsibilities per day, is 56.1 for women and 25.9 for men.

=== Anti-discrimination laws ===
On August 9, 1956, 20,000 women held a protest march at the Union Buildings in Pretoria to protest against passes for women. The march was organised under the banner of the Federation of South African Women (FSAW). This day later became known as National Women's Day in South Africa.

The Matrimonial Property Act 88 was passed on November 1, 1984, and overruled the economic, social, legal, and property and subordination of White, Indian, and colored married women to their male spouses. Before the Act, women were seen as legal minors in the eyes of the law once married, which stripped them of any legal protections or individual social liberties, and outlined that all economic or property assets be passed through male lineage. On December 2, 1988, the Act was also amended to protect African women in civil unions.

After the country's first democratic elections in 1994, many discriminatory statutes in South Africa were scrapped and replaced with the Domestic Violence Act of 1998. The 1994 Constitution also established the first Commission on Gender Equality to make sure that the rights and protections outlined in the new constitution were respected, followed and adapted to suit the evolving needs of South African women.

=== Marital rape law ===
Traditionally in South Africa, it was allowed for one to have non-consensual intercourse with one's wife, and not be constituted as rape. The Law Commission proposed a law in 1987, which would criminalize marital rape in South Africa. The Minister of Justice introduced the bill to a preliminary committee, which refused the draft, which stated marital rape as a crime. The bill was revised to make marital rape an aggravating circumstance of conviction for assault. This newly drafted bill was accepted by parliament and passed in 1989, becoming part of South African law. The reason parliament did not initially want to criminalize marital rape is that it would potentially increase the already high divorce rates in South Africa at the time. It was viewed by South African law that marital rape was not as serious as "ordinary" rape, therefore should not have as harsh consequences.

In 1993, South Africa passed the Prevention of Family Violence Act. The Act criminalized marital rape and other forms of domestic violence. Spousal rape has now been classified and incorporated into the offense of rape. The Act also abolished the "cautionary rule", which allows a judge to decide the credibility of a rape survivor.

South Africa is considered one of the most progressive states in Africa with respect to women's rights. However, there is a lot more that must be done in South Africa regarding marital rape. Marital rape is deeply embedded in the culture, especially in rural areas of South Africa. Laws have encouraged social change, but more institutional transformation is needed across the country.

The Domestic Violence Act 116 of 1998 was purposed to protect victims from domestic abuse. This is the State of South Africa announcing its commitment to stand against domestic violence. The Act requires police to report any domestic violence act, and gives them the ability to arrest any potential offender. It states that any complaint can be filed as a protection order in court. TActact also states how the court system must handle such orders.

Marital rape in South Africa has often been seen as a legacy of apartheid. There was a culture of dominance, power, and aggression, which led to more frequent raping. Scholars view rape as intertwined with racial injustice within the Apartheid system. Historians found that when researching the culture of rape in South Africa during this time, it was so common that communities just accepted it as a part of everyday life. Many women were embarrassed to admit to marital rape because the government and society were run by patriarchal power.

=== Persecution of activists ===
During the 1950s, activists from the Federation of South African Women (FSAW) were placed on trial for treason, alongside members of the African National Congress (ANC), the South African Communist Party and other organisations.

== Challenges ==
According to research on the history of the Federation of South African Women, initially, the struggle of women in South Africa was seen as a two-pronged issue: firstly, the issue of apartheid, which discriminated against non-whites, and secondly, the issue of laws and institutions that discriminated against women. During the time of apartheid, women of color experienced significant inequity as they were a part of both repressed groups. Women of color suffered from the structural violence tied to discrimination against non-whites in addition to the being subject to the inequalities assumed by all women. The oppression these women of color faced also impacted their socioeconomic standing, with the working class consisting almost entirely of women of color, thus forcing women of color to face three separate forms of oppression and discrimination. Additionally, women of color were the primary demographic involved in agriculture and service work, two sectors of labor that were not covered by protective labor legislation until 1994. For several decades, anti-apartheid causes and protests took precedence over gender equality initiatives. Following the abolition of apartheid in 1991 and a transition to democracy in 1994, more attention was devoted to women's rights.

Some have argued that feminism in South Africa was often associated with white, middle-class women. For black South Africans, feminism may often be a highly charged position to take up; it has been seen as a colonial importation, white and middle-class. There are contemporary black African woman feminists, such as Thuli Madonsela.

Broadly, feminism in South Africa has elicited varied responses. Some support the effort and view the advancement of women as a parallel issue to the nation's advancement and liberation. Others reject the feminist movement because it is perceived to threaten customary patriarchal practices and male authority in South Africa.

== Organizations ==
While there is no peak body organisation for women in South Africa, what passes for the women's movement is a collection of disparate NGOs such as People Opposing Women Abuse, Sonke Gender Justice and Progressive Women's Movement of South Africa. Women's organizations in South Africa fight not only for women's liberation but national liberation from the racial history of the country, as one liberation cannot fully exist without the other being reached as well.

Other organisations that have played a historical role in promoting the rights and privileges of South African women include:

- Federation of South African Women (FSAW) – a women's group active in protesting discriminatory pass laws aimed at restricting movement of coloured women.
- African National Congress Women's League (ANCWL) – initially established in 1948 and re-established in the 1990s, aimed at organising women politically and within the African National Congress in particular. Today, the ANCWL has been criticised as being more of a recruitment arm for the ANC.
- Women's National Coalition (WNC) – established in the early 1990s, to bring the issue of gender equality into the public discourse.
- Federation of South African Women (FSAW) - umbrella organization established in 1954 for all women-oriented organizations in South Africa.

Other national and regional organisations include:

- Progressive Women's Movement of South Africa (PWMSA) – a national women's movement founded in 2006.
- Rape Crisis (RC) – a feminist nongovernmental organisation based in the Western Cape Province which advocates for gender equality and the freedom from gender-based violence.

== People ==
- Jani Allan, media personality, feminist author, animal rights activist.
- Pregs Govender, activist, author, and former Member of Parliament.
- Anne McClintock, writer and feminist scholar.
- Elizabeth Maria Molteno, 19th-century women's rights activist, particularly active in the women's suffrage movement.
- Diana E. H. Russell, feminist writer and activist, born and raised in South Africa and currently living in the United States.
- Olive Schreiner, author of The Story of an African Farm recognised as one of the first feminist novels.
- Shamima Shaikh, Muslim women's rights activist.
- Julia Solly, early suffragist and feminist.

== See also ==
- Women in South Africa
  - Sexual violence in South Africa
- Women's suffrage in South Africa
  - Women's Enfranchisement Act, 1930
- African feminism
