= Primrose baronets of Redholme (1903) =

The Primrose baronetcy, of Redholme, Dumbreck, in Govan in the County of the City of Glasgow, was created in the Baronetage of the United Kingdom on 7 July 1903 for John Primrose. He was a senior partner in the firm of William Primrose & Sons, flour millers, of Glasgow, and served as Lord Provost of Glasgow from 1903 to 1905.

== Primrose baronets, of Redholme (1903) ==
- Sir John Ure Primrose, 1st Baronet (1847–1924)
- Sir William Louis Primrose, 2nd Baronet (1880–1953)
- Sir John Ure Primrose, 3rd Baronet (1908–1984)
- Sir Alasdair Neil Primrose, 4th Baronet (1935–1986)
- Sir John Ure Primrose, 5th Baronet (born 1960)

The heir presumptive is the present holder's brother Andrew Richard Primrose (born 1966).

== Notes ==
Baronetage of the United Kingdom
New creation	Baronet (of Murieston); 1903–1904	Extinct
Preceded by Steel baronets	Primrose baronets of Redholme; 7 July 1903	Succeeded by Samuel baronets
