= Women in South Africa =

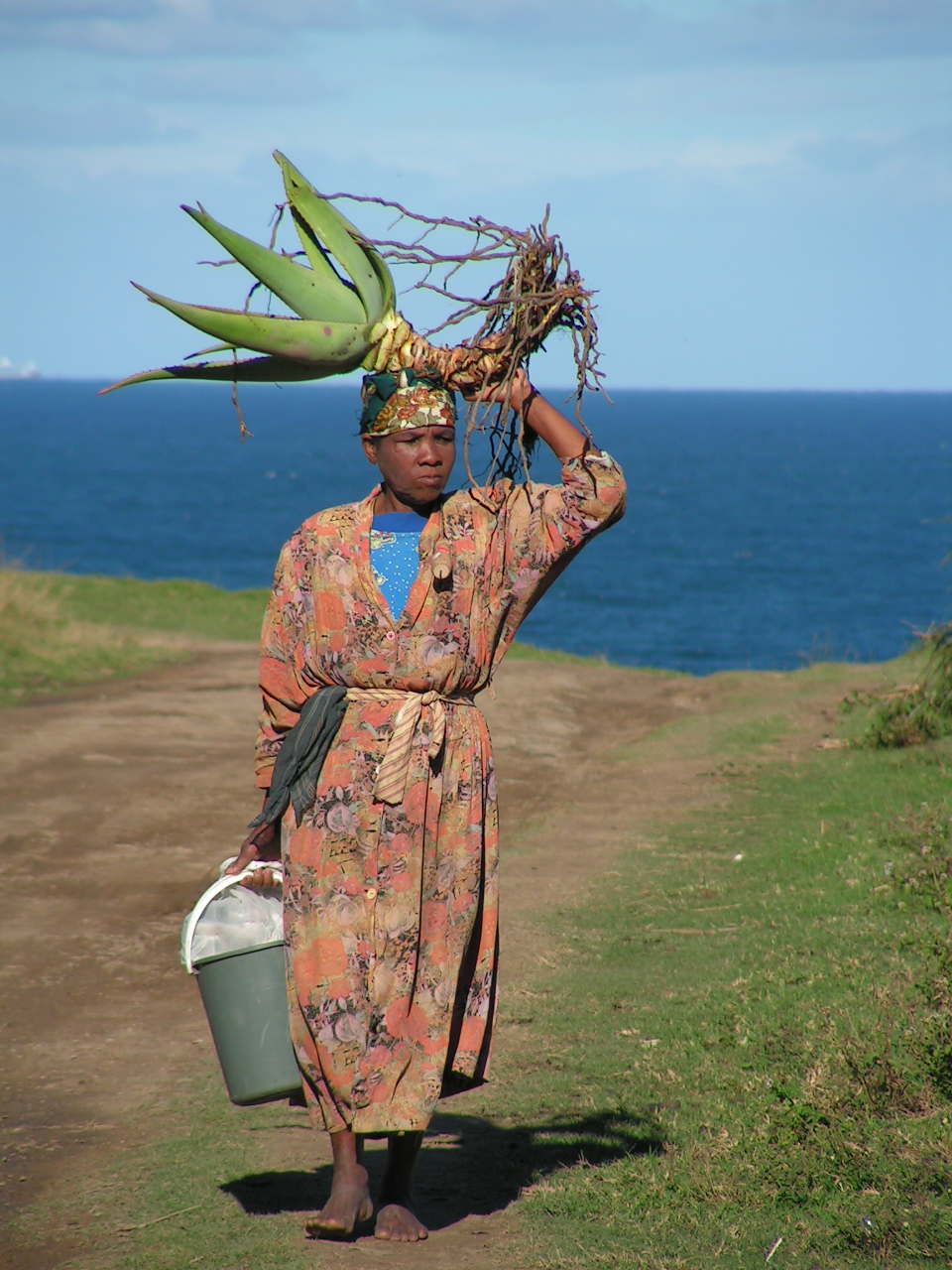
- Mpondo woman in South Africa

General statistics
- Maternal mortality (per 100,000): 88,0 (2020)
- Women in parliament: 41.1% (2013)
- Women over 25 with secondary education: 72.7% (2012)
- Women in labour force: 52% (2017)

Gender Inequality Index
- Value: 0.405 (2021)
- Rank: 97th out of 191

Global Gender Gap Index
- Value: 0.782 (2022)
- Rank: 20th out of 146

It is thought that multiple ethnic groups in South Africa have long-standing beliefs concerning gender roles, and most are based on the premise that women in South Africa are less important, or less deserving of power, than men. Some view African traditional social organizations as male-centered and male-dominated. One prevailing caricature of Afrikaner religious beliefs emphasizes a strong, biblically grounded belief that women's contributions to society should normally be approved by, or undertaken on behalf of, men. Claims are even made of modern sexism and Christianity being introduced into what is now South Africa by the ancestors of the Afrikaners.

20th-century economic and political developments presented South African women with both new obstacles and new opportunities to wield influence. For example, labour force requirements in cities and mining areas have often drawn men away from their homes for months at a time, and, as a result, women have borne many traditionally male responsibilities in the village and home. Women have had to ensure the day-to-day survival of their families and to conduct financial and legal transactions that would otherwise have been reserved for men.

== History ==
Women's movement in South Africa began with the organization of the Women's Christian Temperance Union of the Cape Colony (WCTU) in 1889. The temperance movement supported women's suffrage on the premise that women would vote to ban or restrict alcohol. In 1911 the Women's Enfranchisement Association of the Union was founded, and in 1930 women's suffrage was granted to white women.

=== Women and apartheid ===
Apartheid imposed new restrictions on Indigenous African women beginning in the 1950s. Many lived in squalor in the former homelands, where malnutrition, illness, and infant mortality were much higher than in urban areas. Other women who followed their husbands into cities or mining areas lived in inadequate, and often illegal, housing near industrial compounds. Many women were forced to do housework. Women frequently left their families to commute long distances to low-wage jobs in the domestic workforce in white neighborhoods. Substantial numbers of temporary workers were in agriculture, and a growing number of women joined the burgeoning industrial workforce, as has been carefully documented in Iris Berger's 'Threads of Solidarity: Women in South African Industry', 1900–1990.

Women became the primary source of resistance to many race-related restrictions during the apartheid era, especially the pass laws, which required Indigenous Africans to carry documents permitting them to be in white-occupied areas. The Women's Defence of the Constitution League, later known as the Black Sash, was formed in 1955, first to demonstrate against such laws and later to assist pass-law violators. Black Sash established pass-law advice centers in many cities and helped reduce sentences or assist violators in other ways.

The African National Congress Women's League (ANCWL), formed in 1943, was able to organise more than 20,000 women to march on government buildings in Pretoria to protest against the pass laws and other apartheid restrictions in 1955. Their protests eventually failed, however. In the early 1960s, pass-law restrictions were extended to women, and new legislation restricted black women without steady employment to stays of no more than seventy-two hours in any urban area. Also in 1964, many senior ANC leaders were arrested, and others fled from South Africa or went underground, and the ANCWL became almost defunct.

Women continued to join the urban workforce, and by the late 1980s, women accounted for at least 90 percent of the domestic workforce and 36 percent of the industrial workforce, according to labor union estimates. However, as in the rest of the world, women's wages were lower than men's for the same job; positions typically held by women were characterised by long hours and few benefits (e.g., sick leave). Women were often dismissed without advance notice and without any form of termination pay.

Conservative Afrikaner women have organised in support of Afrikaner cultural preservation and apartheid since the early 1970s. The Kappiekommando was established in the late 1970s to demand a return to traditional Afrikaner values. This organisation was named for its distinctive Voortrekker dress, which caused some young Afrikaners and others to ridicule its members' appearance and their militancy. The Kappiekommando's militant opposition to political reforms eventually contributed to its marginalisation, even among staunchly conservative Afrikaners.

The Afrikanervroue-Kenkrag (AVK), another Afrikaner women's organisation, was formed in 1983 and primarily opposed de facto racial desegregation in schools and other public spaces. AVK membership grew to about 1,000 during the mid-1980s. The group published a monthly newsletter and cooperated with other Afrikaner organisations. Still, like the Kappiekommando, the AVK lost support when mainstream Afrikaner political leaders began working towards de jure racial desegregation in the early 1990s.

=== Women in the 1990s and 2000s ===
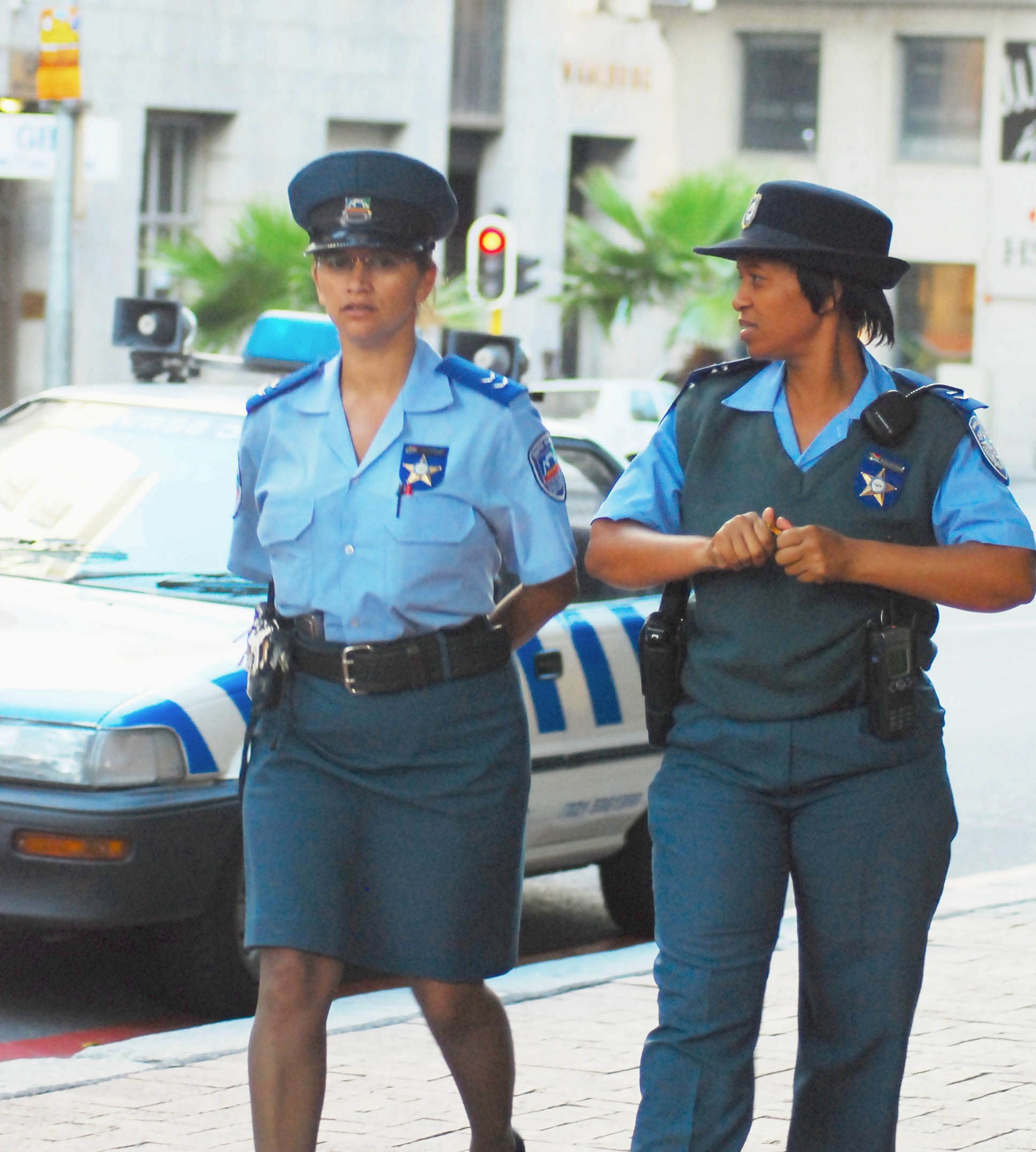
Female police in Cape Town, 2010

The ANCWL was revived in 1990, after the ban on the ANC was lifted, and women in more than 500 towns and cities organised to press for the inclusion of gender issues in the upcoming constitutional negotiations. At the insistence of its Women's League, the ANC accepted, in principle, the proposal that women should receive one-third of the political appointments in the new government. Other symbolic gains by the ANCWL have included firm policy stands on women's rights and protection against abuse and exploitation, but translating these standards into enforceable laws proved to be a difficult task.

Women are achieving new prominence in politics as a result of the sweeping political reforms of the mid-1990s. In 1994, women won election to eighty of the 400 seats in the National Assembly, the only directly elected house of parliament, and a woman, Frene Ginwala, was elected Speaker of the National Assembly. Women were also elected to almost one-third of the seats in the nine provincial assemblies.

Nelson Mandela, as president, appointed two women cabinet ministers in May 1994, and a woman succeeded the late minister of housing, Joe Slovo, after his death in January 1995. Three women were deputy ministers in early months of 1995. One of these, President Mandela's former wife, Winnie Mandela, was appointed deputy minister of arts, culture, science, and technology.

Eliminating violence against women and improving educational opportunities for women were almost universally supported goals in South Africa in the mid-1990s, but these goals received only rhetorical support in many cases. More urgent priorities are to eliminate the vestiges of apartheid legislation and to improve economic and social conditions for the very poor, for children, and for other groups that were especially disadvantaged in recent decades. Gender-related inequalities were likely to be decried but relegated to secondary importance well into the 21st century.

=== 2010s – present and Gender based violence ===
According to UN Women, the murder rate for women increased by 117 percent between 2015 and 2016/2017. Also, the number of women who experienced sexual offenses increased by 53 percent between 2015/16 and 2016/17.

In August 2018, women used the start of the country's Women's Month to embark on a protest dubbed #TotalShutdown, to demonstrate their frustration and anger on the increasing levels of Gender Based Violence (GBV) in South Africa. The President, Cyril Ramaphosa, was handed a Memorandum of Understanding by the organizers of the protest, where a gender summit was convened and funded by the government. "The 24 demands in our memorandum signify 24 years of democracy in which women and gender non-conforming people have been ignored", said Gaopalelwe Phalaetsile, a representative of the #TotalShutDown National Committee.

On 21 November 2025, South Africa declared gender-based violence and femicide a national disaster amid national women's protests organized by Women For Change. During the G20 summit, there was a protest dubbed the G20 Women's Shutdown that called for women to stay home from work, refrain from spending money, observe 15 minutes of silence at 12:00 local time (10:00 GMT) in honor of the 15 women who are murdered in the country every day, and make their demands impossible to ignore.

== Marriage and family life ==
Until the late 20th century, married women's rights remained legally restricted. The family law has changed gradually throughout the 20th century, with white women being the first to gain rights, and black women in customary marriages being the last. Marriage law has, for most of the 20th century, been based on the Roman-Dutch law concept of marital power of the husband, a doctrine in terms of which a wife was legally an incapax under the usufruct tutorship (tutela usufructuaria) of her husband. The marital power included the power of the husband to administer both his wife's separate property and their community property. A wife was not able to leave a will, enter into a contract, or sue or be sued, in her own name or without the permission of her husband. The report of the Women's Legal Disabilities Commission in 1949 led to the enacting of the Matrimonial Affairs Act in 1953, which improved the legal status of wives by restricting the marital power, but it did not abolish it. The Matrimonial Property Act of 1984 abolished it prospectively (i.e. for marriages contracted after the act came into force) but not for marriages between black people. An amendment in 1988 abolished it prospectively for marriages of black people under the civil law, but not for marriages contracted under customary law. A further amendment in 1993 repealed the marital power in all civil marriages, regardless of when they were contracted. The marital power persisted, however, in the Transkei (which was nominally independent from 1976 to 1994), but it was held to be unconstitutional for civil marriages by the High Court in 1999. In 2000, when it came into force, the Recognition of Customary Marriages Act, 1998 abolished the marital power for all marriages under customary law throughout South Africa. Other important changes enacted by 20th century legislation include abolishing the concept of restitution of conjugal rights by the Divorce Act, 1979 (Act No. 70 of 1979), Section 14, as well as enacting several specific laws against domestic violence in the 1990s (see Domestic violence in South Africa). South Africa outlawed marital rape in 1993. The 21st century has seen different conceptions about marriage: in 2006, South Africa became the fifth country in the world to allow same-sex marriage.

In South Africa, the practice of marriage by abduction is known under the name of ukuthwala, and is the custom of abducting young girls and forcing them into marriage, often with the consent of their parents. This practice occurs mainly in rural areas, in particular the Eastern Cape and KwaZulu-Natal. The girls who are victims of this practice are frequently underage.

== Status of women and girls ==
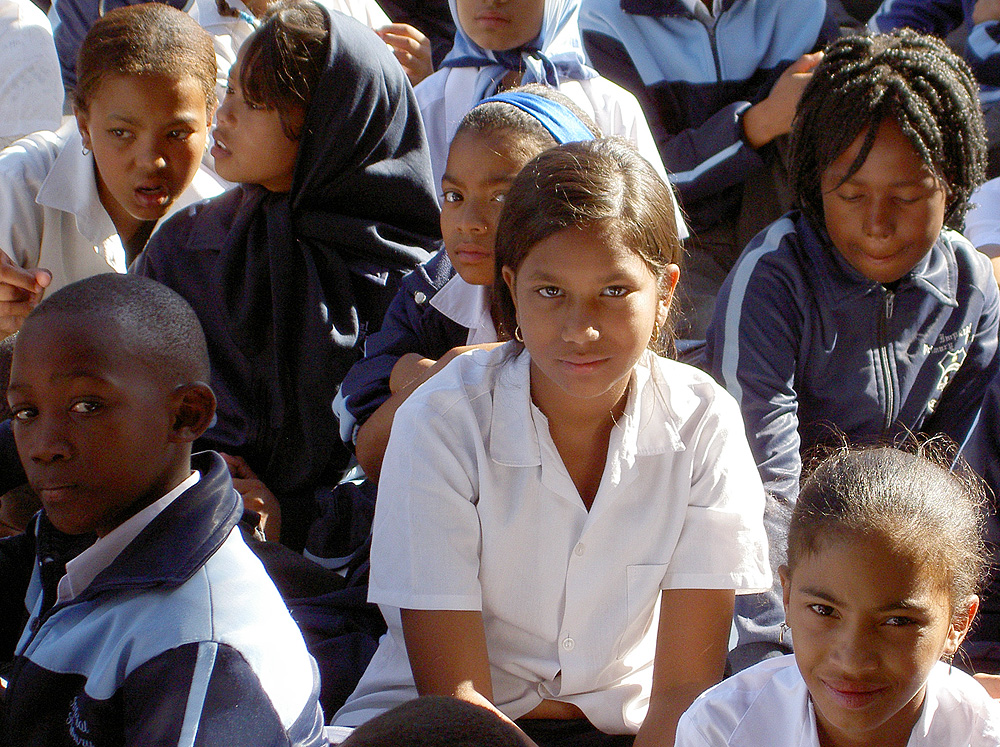
School girls in Cape Town

In 2015, the UN General Assembly (UNGA), SABC, and ONE launched the Strong Girl Campaign to engage South Africans on the importance of the South African government placing women and girls at the center of its UNGA commitments, where new development goals would be agreed upon. The UNGA discussed the new Sustainable Development Goals (SDGs), which would direct world development efforts for the next 15 years. The South African government has enacted several policies and legislation to advance women's empowerment. For instance, the Constitution includes Section 9, which promotes equality for all persons and freedom from discrimination, and the Employment Equity Act, No 55 (1998), which strives to achieve equality in the workplace by promoting fair treatment in employment. The status of women in South Africa remains complex, but due to the UN and the South African government, some improvements have been made. Despite the improvements, much more investment is needed in programs that empower women and girls to improve their status and opportunities.

== Education and Workforce ==
=== Workforce ===
Jobs for women in South Africa were made difficult for them to obtain during apartheid, restricting them to household jobs. Since that era in time, South African women still deal with various forms of restrictions on their choices for career and education based on ideas of gender roles. Fields involving higher education such as STEM continue to show limitations in South African women's access to the necessary education.

Black South African women tend to struggle with pursuing a career more than average, due to their struggles with both sexism and racism, not limited to the laws made against them during the apartheid era. Because of their resistance to these rules, they are often categorized for their independent nature, resisting concepts they view as oppressive due to the lingering stereotypes, such as the expectation of them to get married.

==== Gender pay gap ====
While the gender wage gap in South Africa has declined in recent years, there is still evidence of a gap in pay between women and men. Different policies that have been introduced beginning in 1997 have led to the progressive decline. However, external factors, such as the limitations South African women face in education, allow the wage gap to persist.

== Sexual violence ==
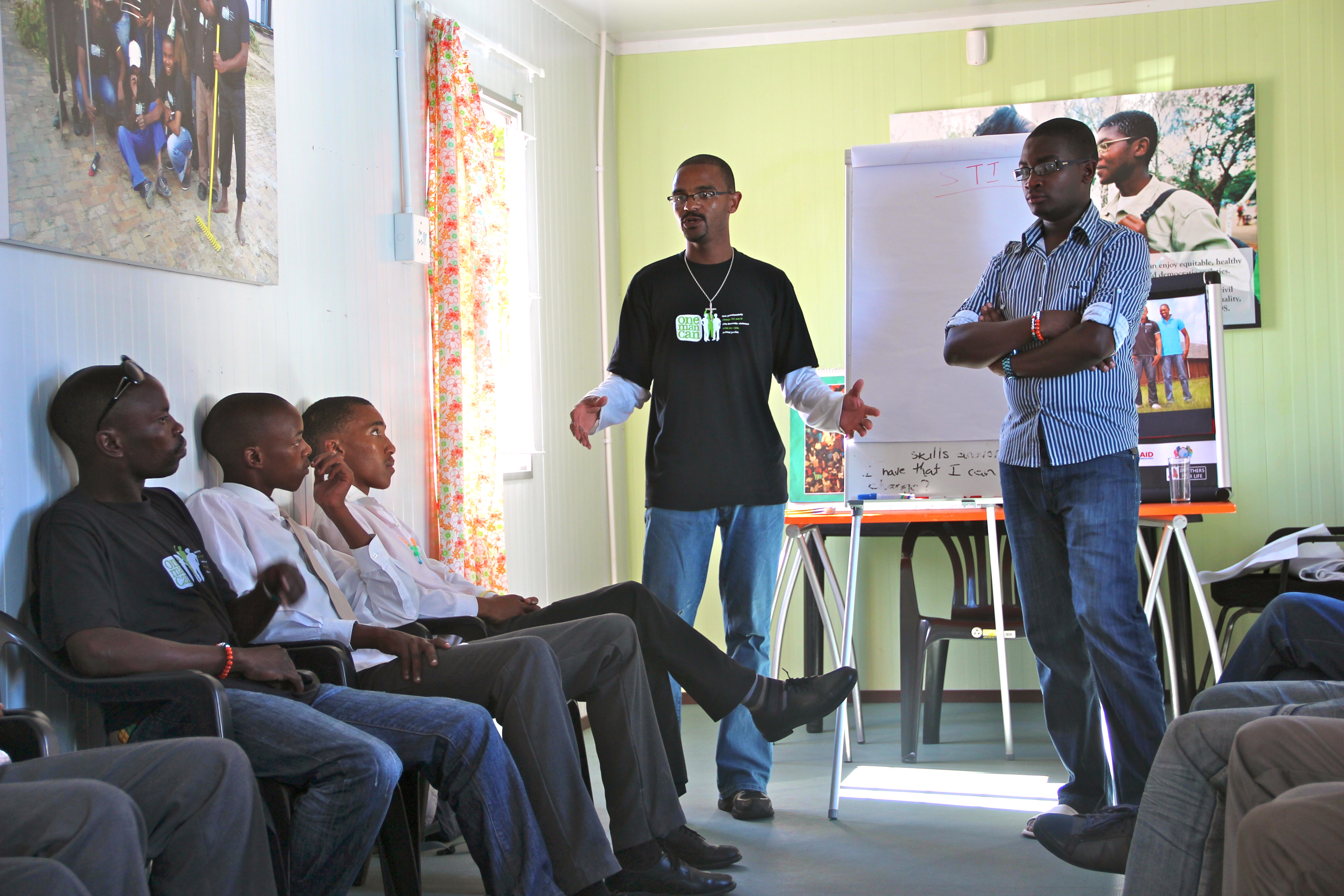
The Sonke Gender Justice programme in South Africa aims to transform societal attitudes towards sexual violence

The rate of sexual violence in South Africa is among the highest in the world. In 1993 South Africa outlawed marital rape. The Criminal Law (Sexual Offences and Related Matters) Amendment Act, 2007 is a comprehensive legal act, which prohibits and punishes sexual violence. Despite the strong legal framework, sexual violence is pervasive in South Africa; in one study, one in four men admitted to having committed rape. It is estimated that there are about 600,000 rape victims per year in the country. Most cases are not reported to authorities. In South Africa, the virgin cleansing myth is still prevalent, leading to high rates of child sexual abuse. During 2015/16, there were 51,895 crimes of a sexual nature reported to the South African Police Service.

In September 2019, on the third day of protests, Cyril Ramaphosa, the president of South Africa, disclosed the violence against women in his country as a national crisis.

In 2018 alone, the number of women murdered in South Africa reached 3.000.

== Reproductive health and rights ==
Estimated HIV prevalence among adults aged 15-49 by country in 2007

Social constructions and expectations play an important role in the South African women's sexual activity, sexual health and her vulnerability to STI exposure.

Sexually transmitted infections (STIs) are a major public health concern, especially in developing countries where the risk of transmission of human immunodeficiency virus (HIV) is high. HIV/AIDS in South Africa is a dire problem. The country has the fourth global rate of infection: in 2016, 18.90% of adults 15–49 years old were living with HIV/AIDS. Only Swaziland, Lesotho, and Botswana have a higher rate. Women are much more likely to be infected. Among women, it has been found that it is older South African women who are married or cohabiting with a partner who are of the highest risk group for HIV exposure. A study has concluded that this is a result of an inequitable power of balance between men and women which leaves women, who have less power in the relationship, unable to request nor negotiate condom use with their partners.

In an article from the World Health Organization, experts looked at data to present estimates of the prevalence, on any given day, of STIs among women in rural South Africa and the proportion who are asymptomatic, symptomatic but not seeking care, and symptomatic and seeking care. The study found that the majority of women with STIs in South Africa remained untreated because either the women did not present obvious symptoms or, even when they did, the symptoms were not recognized or acted upon. The study concluded that improved case management alone is "therefore unlikely to have a major public health impact. Improving partner treatment and women's awareness of symptoms is essential, while the potential of mass STI treatment needs to be explored".

Data has shown a correlation between the increase in sex education and the decrease in new cases of HIV infections among young women in South Africa, with education on safe sex practices having substantially helped to curb the spread of STIs in general.

A study published in the American Journal of Public Health concluded that safe sex education before young people's engagement in sexual activity – their "sexual debut" – was a major indicator of whether young people engaged in condom use.

Women's vaginal practices, which include the cleansing, treatment of infections, pampering, and use of beauty products, affects their sexual and reproductive health and susceptibility to STI. A large percentage of women in South Africa engage in intra-vaginal product use, i.e., douching, which increases their chances for HIV infection.

Maternal mortality is one of the lowest in Africa, although still high by global standards. However, in South Africa, there are conflicting reports on the prevalence of maternal and neonatal mortality, derived from both direct and indirect estimation techniques.

South Africa's Constitution recognizes and protects the rights of all citizens to access safe, effective, appropriate, and affordable reproductive health education, contraception, and health services. However, there are contradictory laws in place regarding women's ability to engage in sexual practices and receive sexual healthcare services. For example, the age of consent in South Africa for women is 16, with the law requiring mandatory reporting of youths engaged in underage sex. However, girls may legally request birth control from medical centers at age 12. Due to the contradictory and confusing nature of such legislation the sexual health services and education given to young women in South Africa is limited by the health care practitioners understanding of the laws and their individual judgments of how to proceed.

Contraceptive use among young South Africans aged 15 to 24 is low, and consequently, the rate of unwanted pregnancies reported among young women is high. A study of contraceptive use and pregnancy among South African women found that 65% of pregnancies in this age group were premarital and unplanned. And a 1988 South Africa Demographic and Health Survey found that 35% of all teenagers had either been pregnant or had given birth by the age of 19.

Types of contraceptives used by South African women are racially stratified, with South African women of color predominantly utilizing contraceptive injections.

South Africa is also one of the few countries in Africa to have a liberal abortion law: under the Choice on Termination of Pregnancy Act, 1996, abortion is allowed on request during the first trimester of pregnancy, and in special circumstances at later stages. However, this does not mean that it is easy to get an abortion in South Africa, as not all health care facilities are equally or adequately equipped to meet the demands for abortion services. As of January 2013, it has been said that it is often cheaper and quicker to get an illegal abortion than to navigate official channels to get a legal abortion.

Social stigmas surrounding abortion, contraception use, and sexual activity among young women and teens are still strong and limit young South African women's ability to access and utilize reproductive health services that are guaranteed to them by their government. This issue is compounded by the fact that while women have the right to free abortions, the government only covers the cost of the abortion procedures, but not the cost of maintaining a dedicated staff or facilities out of which abortions can be performed.

== See also ==
- Feminism in South Africa
- Domestic violence in South Africa
- History of women's rights in South Africa
- Women in Africa
