= Sir James Steel, 1st Baronet =

Scottish builder and businessman

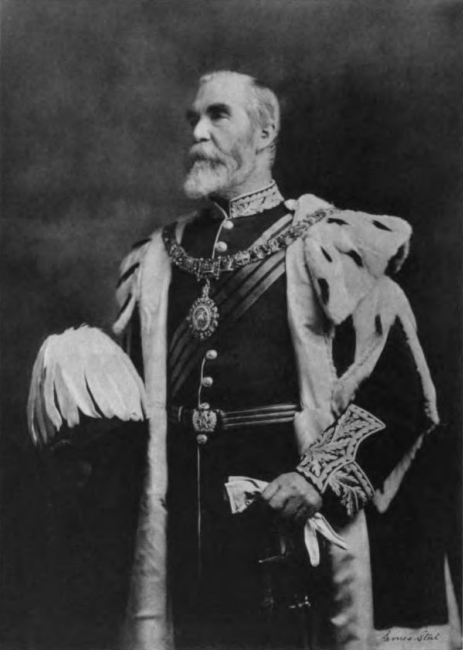
Sir James Steel, Lord Provost Edinburgh

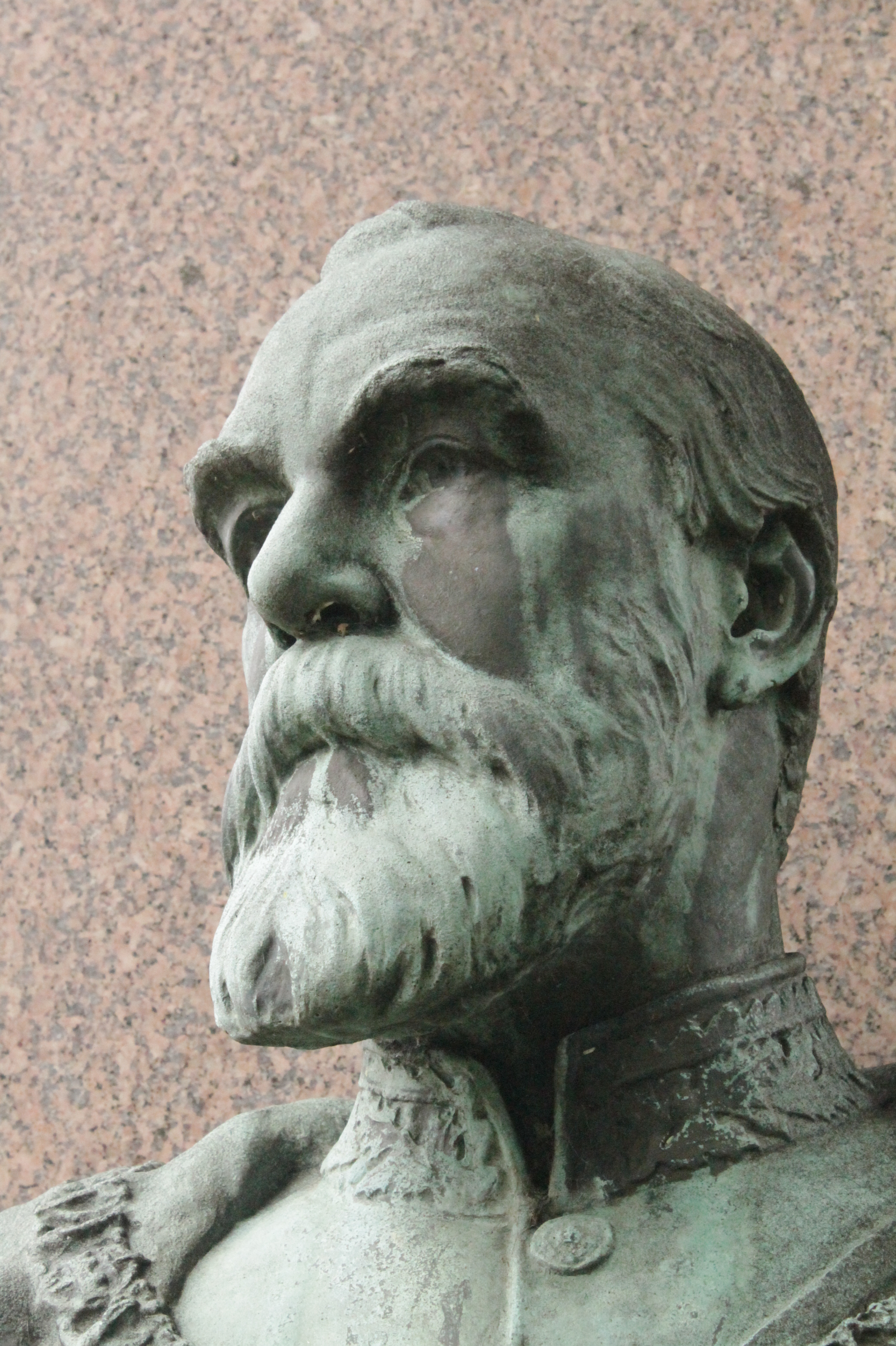
Sir James Steel by John Stevenson Rhind

Sir James Steel, 1st Baronet (13 March 1829 – 4 September 1904) was a Scottish builder and businessman who served as Lord Provost of Edinburgh from 1900 to 1903.

Steel set up the largest building firm in Edinburgh in his day. His rise to fame and fortune is described as a textbook "rags to riches" story.

== Life ==
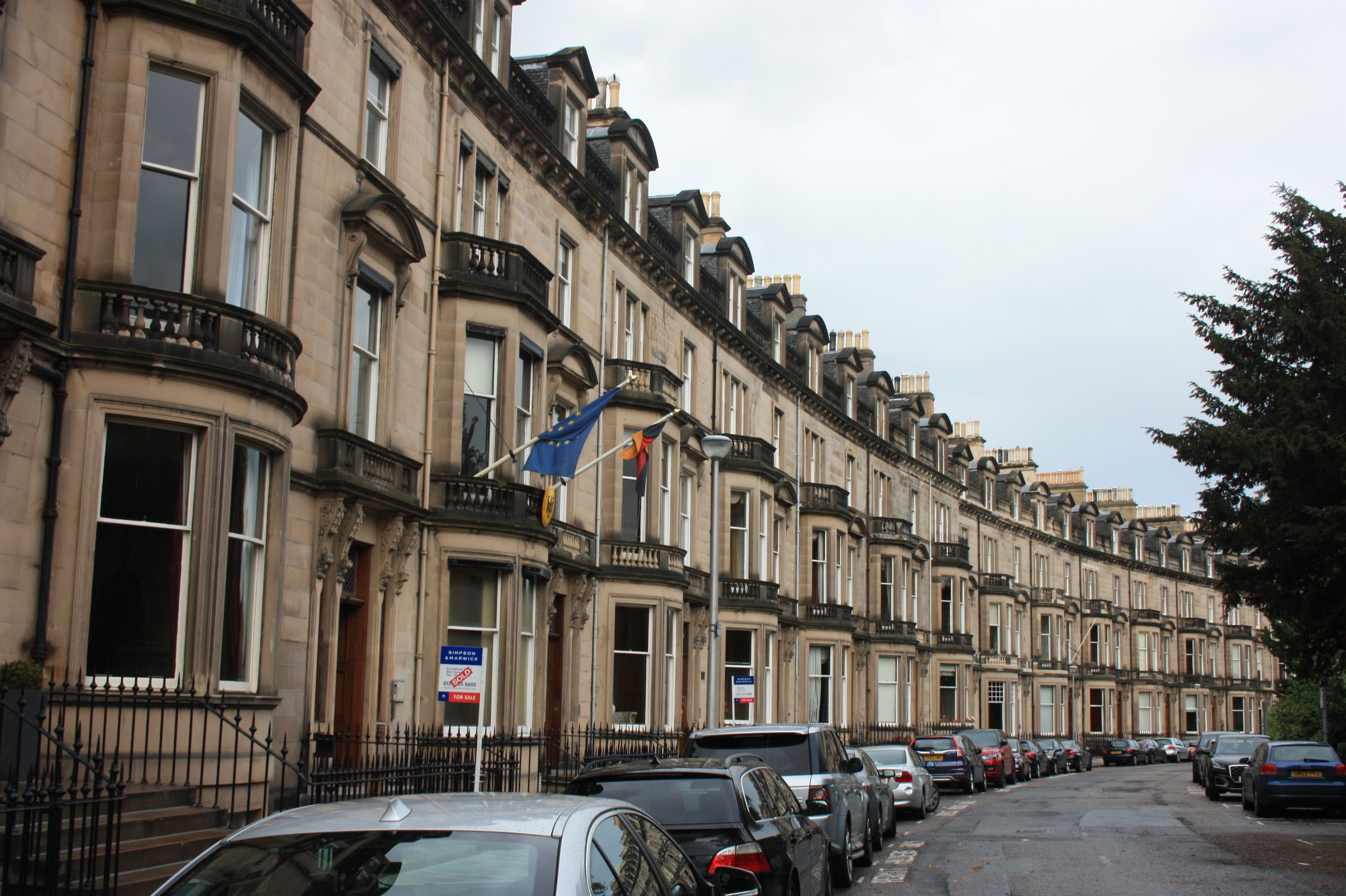
Eglinton Crescent

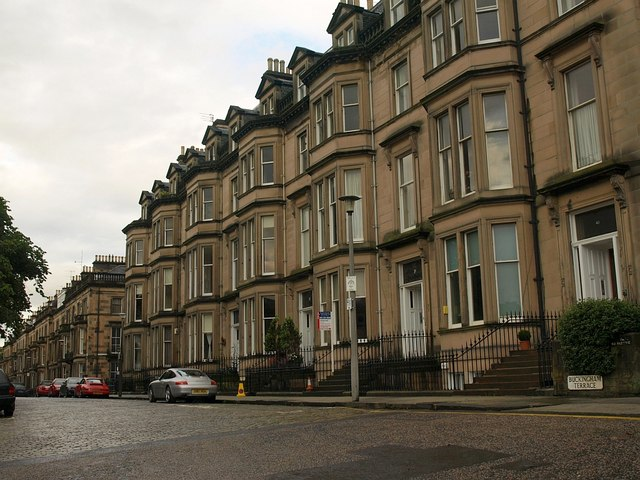
Buckingham Terrace

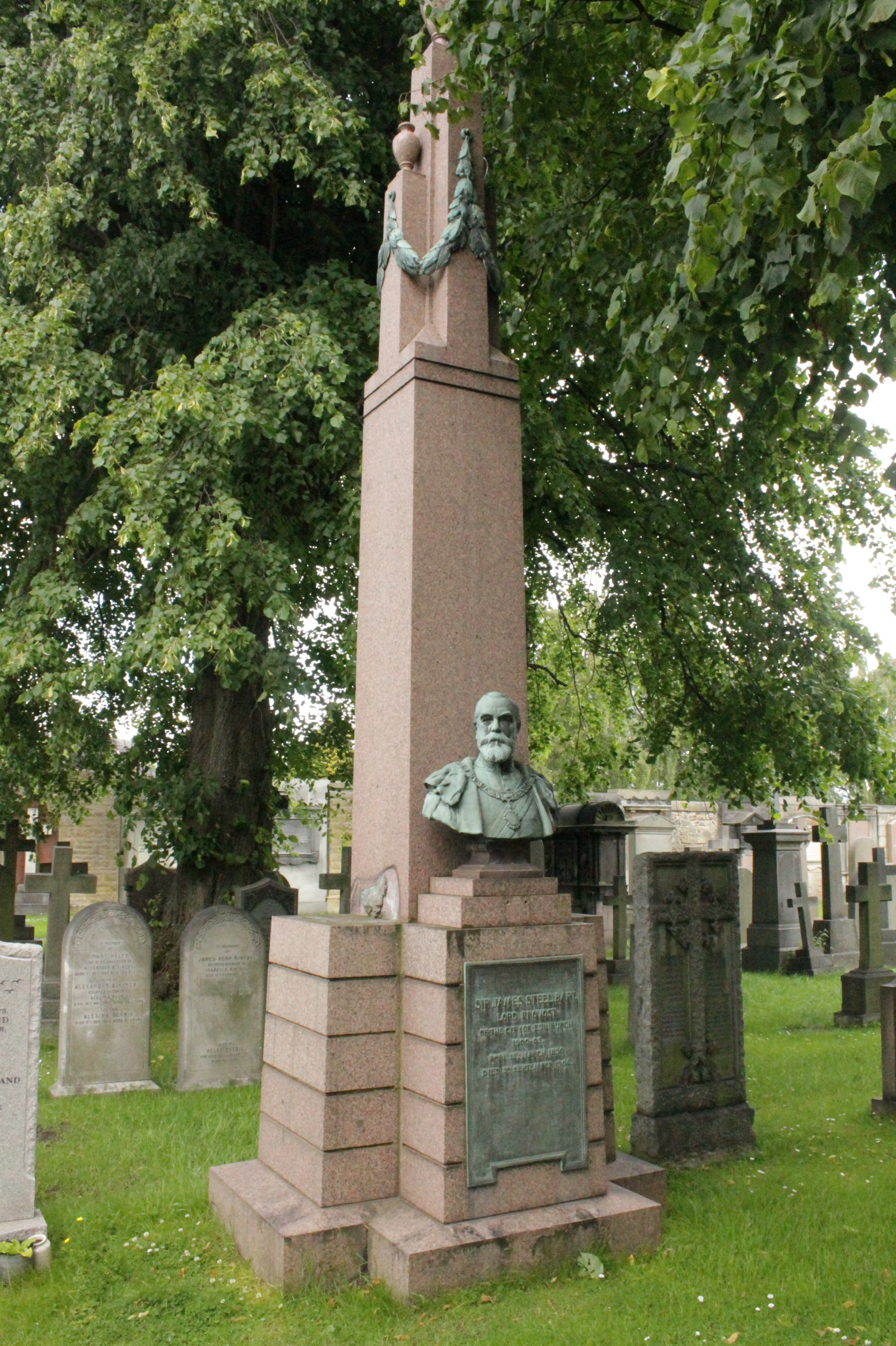
The grave of Sir James Steel, Dean Cemetery

He was born on 13 March 1829 at Summerside Mains in Cambusnethan to James Steel (1791–1871), a farmer, and Marion Reid (c. 1800 – ?). While serving as Lord Provost of Edinburgh he named two streets after the farm he was born on, Summerside Place and Summerside Street.

In 1866 he began a building firm in Edinburgh, linked to a stone quarry business which he already owned. He was then living at 11 Lothian Road. His building work is characterised by flair, and his terraces in the West End were aimed at affluent sections of the Edinburgh population. Those include: Eglinton Crescent, Coates Gardens, Buckingham Terrace (west), Glencairn Crescent, Belgrave Place and the west end of Belgrave Crescent. In these proposals Steel replaced the original architect John Chesser (who he originally worked with) with his own architect Alexander Macnaughtan and was threatened with legal action for variance from the plan. This resulted in the final section of Buckingham Terrace being built omitted (later built on as a church).

He entered Edinburgh Town Council in 1872 and served as a magistrate for many years.

In 1878 he bought several acres of land west of Dean Bridge from the bankrupt Alexander Learmonth who had inherited the land from his successful father John Learmonth.

In 1894 he bought a 33-acre site between Queensferry Road and Comely Bank and developed this as dense (but attractively laid out) four storey tenements. The area is now the Comely Bank/Learmonth estate. Its centrepiece is the dramatic switchback street, Comely Bank Avenue.

In 1900 he succeeded Sir Mitchell Mitchell Thomson as Lord Provost. He was succeeded in turn in 1903 by Sir Robert Cranston. He was created a Baronet by King Edward VII in 1903 during his first visit to Scotland.

He died at 32 Colinton Road in Edinburgh on 3 December 1904. He is buried in Dean Cemetery in the west of the city. The grave lies in the first northern extension attaching the main cemetery, just north-east of the huge obelisk to Alexander Russell.

The large red granite obelisk to Steel includes a fine bronze bust by the sculptor John Stevenson Rhind, erected in 1906. The monument previously held bronze dogs lying on the shoulders of the monument. These were stolen in the 1980s.

== Family ==
On 4 August 1883, Steel married Barbara Joanna Paterson (1857–1943), a Scottish suffragist. The couple had no children.

== Other positions ==
- Chairman of the Niddrie and Benhar Coal Company
- Chairman of the Broxburn Oil Company
- Member of the Iron and Steel Institute

Baronetage of the United Kingdom
New creation	Baronet (of Murieston); 1903–1904	Extinct
Preceded by Nutting baronets	Steel baronets of Murieston; 6 July 1903	Succeeded by Primrose baronets
