= Women's National Coalition =

South African women's organization

The Women's National Coalition was established in South Africa in April 1992 as a national alliance of women's groups across the country. Women were represented from across the political, economic, racial, cultural and religious spectrum. The coalition was launched to survey the concerns and needs of women throughout South Africa. It was aimed at ensuring that women participate in the making of the constitution and in the formulation of the Women's Charter that was launched in 1994. The Women's National Coalition now focuses on lobbying (of government), training (for parliamentary and local government candidates and community leaders) and plays a key role in Adult Basic Education and Gender training.

== History ==
During the negotiated transition to democracy in South Africa, the WNC's Women's Charter campaign mobilised two million women to influence the drafting of South Africa's Constitution.

The WNC's built its national campaign around five primary themes: women's legal status; women's access to land, resources and water; violence against women; health; and work.

Some scholars describe the WNC as the closest South Africa has come to having a strong women's movement. However, they note that the WNC was not backed up by a strong, locally rooted, mass movement of women. Its affiliates tended to be women's organizations with long histories, but with weak organizational capacities and resources. The coalition did not use a mass mobilization strategy to back up its demands, rather, it relied on access to political parties as its main lever of influence. At the same time, the demands of the constitutional negotiations required the coalition to utilize the technical expertise of feminist academics and lawyers in ways that previous women's movements had not managed.

Some scholars note that the WNC and the gendered outcomes of the South African transition was a process influenced by the South African trade union movement.

The period since 1994 witnessed the weakening and virtual collapse of the WNC. The group remained active as late as 2002, and was involved with the concerns and priorities for the World Summit on Sustainable Development.

== See also ==
- Feminism in South Africa
