= Steel baronets =

Baronetcy in the Baronetage of the United Kingdom

There have been two baronetcies created for persons with the surname Steel, both in the Baronetage of the United Kingdom.

The Steel Baronetcy, of Murieston in Midcalder, Midlothian, was created in the Baronetage of the United Kingdom on 6 July 1903 for James Steel, Lord Provost of Edinburgh from 1900 to 1903. The title became extinct on his death in 1904.

The Steel, later Strang-Steel Baronetcy, of Philiphaugh in the County of Selkirk, was created in the baronetage of the United Kingdom on 2 July 1938 for Samuel Strang Steel, conservative member of parliament for Ashford from 1918 to 1929 and Lord-Lieutenant of Selkirkshire from 1948 to 1958. The second baronet was a deputy lieutenant of Selkirkshire. The third baronet assumed the additional surname of Strang.

== Steel baronets, of Murieston (1903) ==
- Sir James Steel, Baronet (1829–1904) Lord Provost of Edinburgh 1900 to 1903

== Steel, later Strang-Steel baronets, of Philiphaugh (1938) ==
- Sir Samuel Strang Steel, 1st Baronet (1882–1961)
- Sir Fiennes William Strang Steel, 2nd Baronet (1912–1992)
- Sir (Fiennes) Michael Strang-Steel, 3rd Baronet (born 1943)

The heir apparent is the present holder's son Fiennes Edward Strang Steel (born 1978).

== See also ==
- Steele Baronets
