= Gude Cause 1909 and 2009 =

Gude Cause was the name of a feminist project, based at the Peace and Justice Centre in Edinburgh, Scotland, which inspired over 60 events and projects throughout Scotland between 2007 and 2009.

Gude Cause aimed to commemorate the work of Scotswomen involved in the suffrage movement, to celebrate women's achievements in the 100 years since the Women's Suffrage Procession which had taken place in Edinburgh in 1909, and to re-energise women's commitment to political representation and action in Scotland.

The work culminated in the re-enactment on 10 October 2009 of the 1909 Edinburgh procession, and was organised by volunteers, women's historians and community workers, in association with The Edinburgh Peace and Justice Resource Centre, achieving the main goal of recreating the original procession in all its glory, while drawing attention to the problems that still need to be faced up to around the world, such as tackling domestic violence, forced marriage, sex trafficking and equal pay.

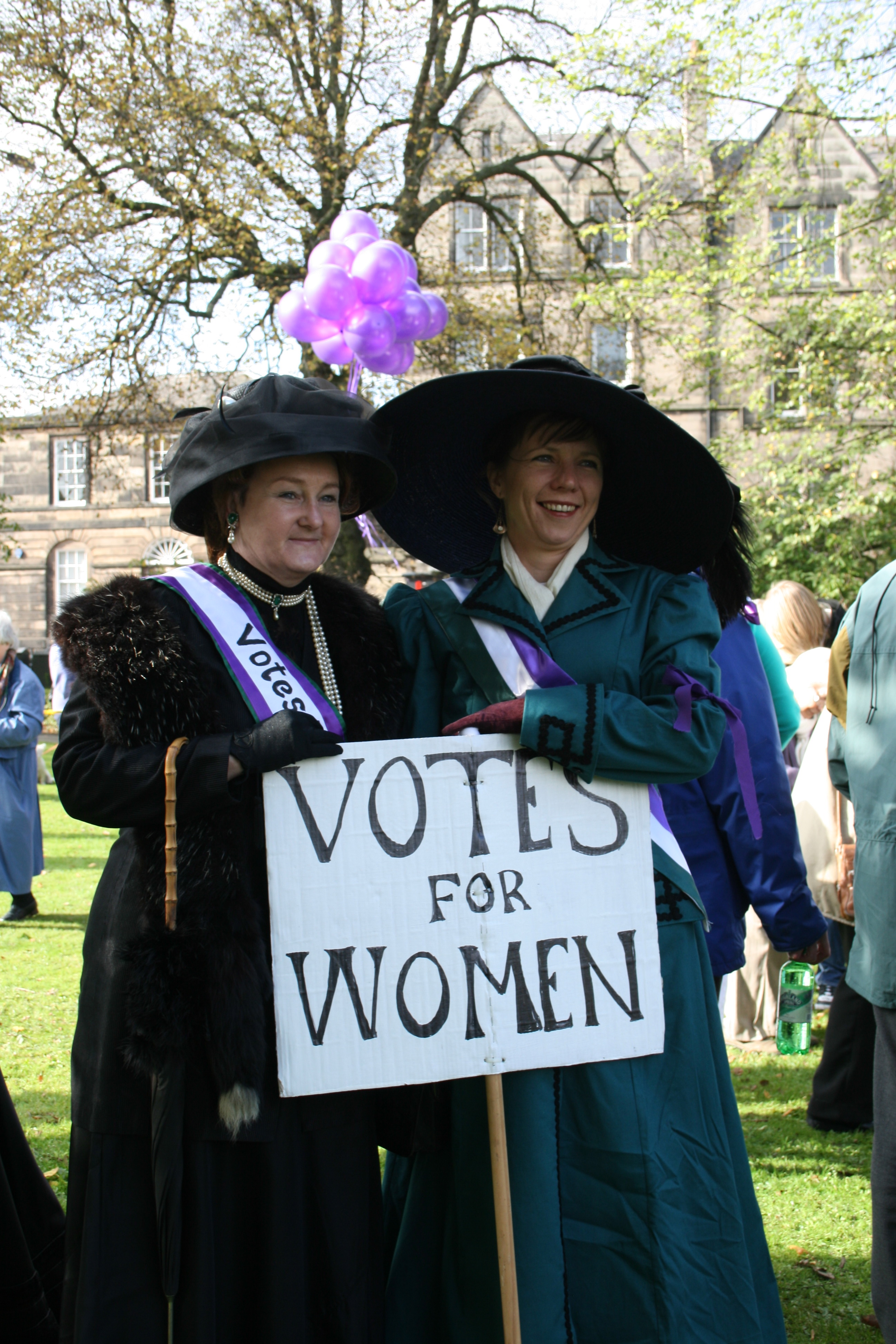
Gude Cause Procession Participants in period dress (2009)

Thousands of people from groups across Scotland had prepared for the day by creating banners, learning old and specially written songs, researching women's struggles in the past and discussing current issues and future aims.

The crowd on the day included women, men and children; students, activists, 'roller derby girls', the University of the Third Age, political parties, faith groups and trade unions; artists and academics; professionals and campaigners for women's rights, social justice and environmental justice, representing a wide spectrum of ages, ethnicities, attitudes and activism and a mixture of beliefs, traditions and movements.

In common with the Suffrage Procession a century before, the Gude Cause Procession 2009 was led by a lone woman piper, Pipe Major Louise Marshall Millington, and featured a band, the Forth Bridges Accordion Band. Two mounted policewomen represented the women on horseback of the 1909 parade. Groups of drummers, including SheBoom, and singers led each section of the Procession, representing the past, the present and the future for women in Scotland.

== Origins and aims ==
In the weeks before the 2007 Scottish Parliamentary election, statistics indicated that a large percentage of women intended to abstain from using the vote that women a century ago had fought so hard to secure. Women – especially young women – appeared to be disillusioned and increasingly apathetic about party politics and representative democracy. However, the same study showed they did still care about the issues and political decisions that affect people's lives in Scotland and around the world.

The research also showed that, when looked at as a group, women often had differing views to men on a wide range subjects, including issues such as the war in Iraq or the replacement of the Trident nuclear missile system. It followed, therefore, that the under representation of women and their views in the political process was not just an academic problem, but that this was likely to result in real deficiencies in government policy and decision-making in not taking into account of the needs of this group of the population.

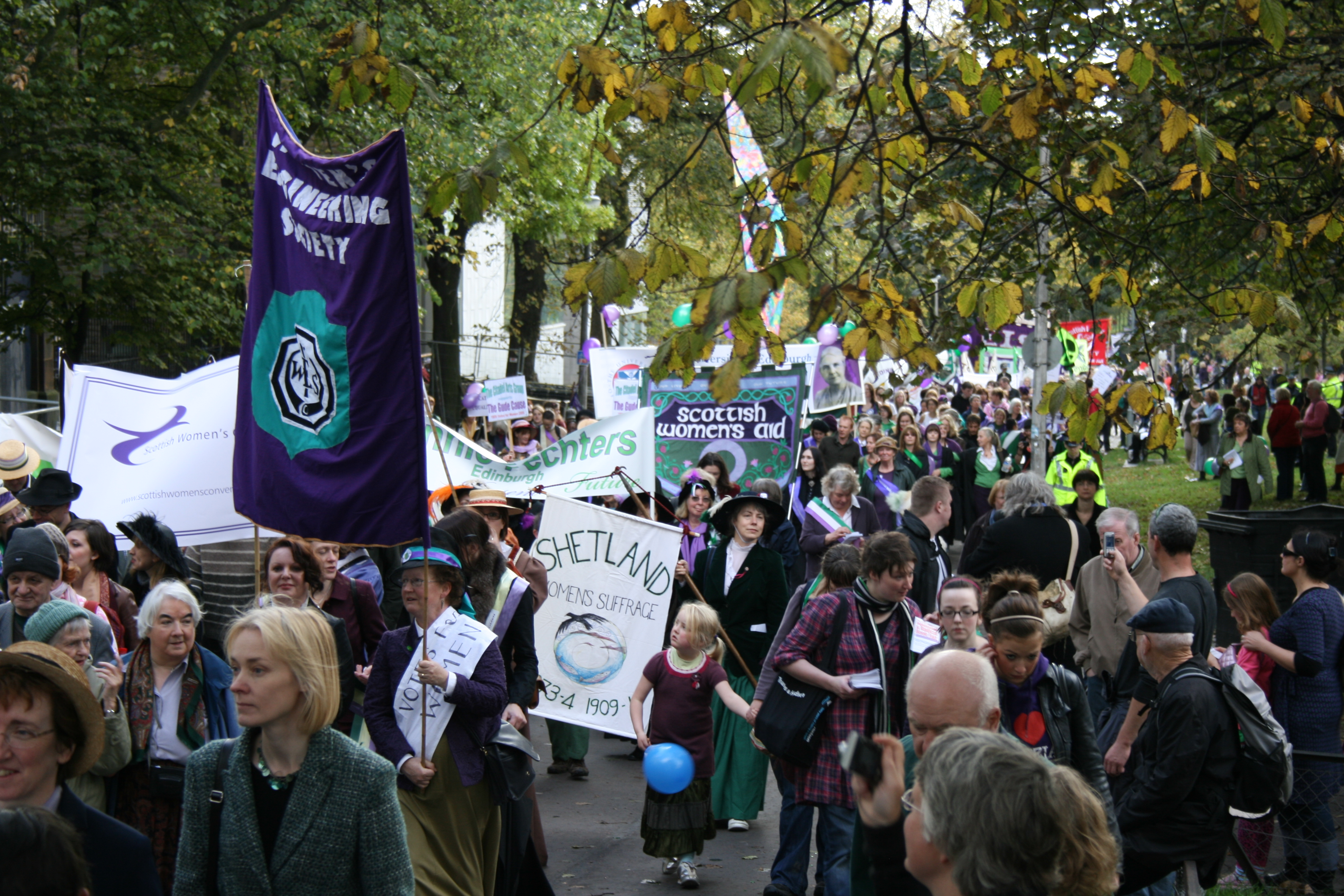
Participants in the Gude Cause Procession, Edinburgh 2009

In April 2007, the Edinburgh Peace & Justice Centre organised a procession along Princes Street in Edinburgh, to raise the profile of women's concerns, to encourage women to re-engage with the political process, and at the most basic level, to make women think about using their vote.

Despite the short notice, several hundred women turned up, walking along Princes Street and climbing Calton Hill to sing "Bread and Roses" and other feminist songs. Participants agreed that this spirit of feminist co-operation could inspire the planning of a more substantial and high-profile public campaign.

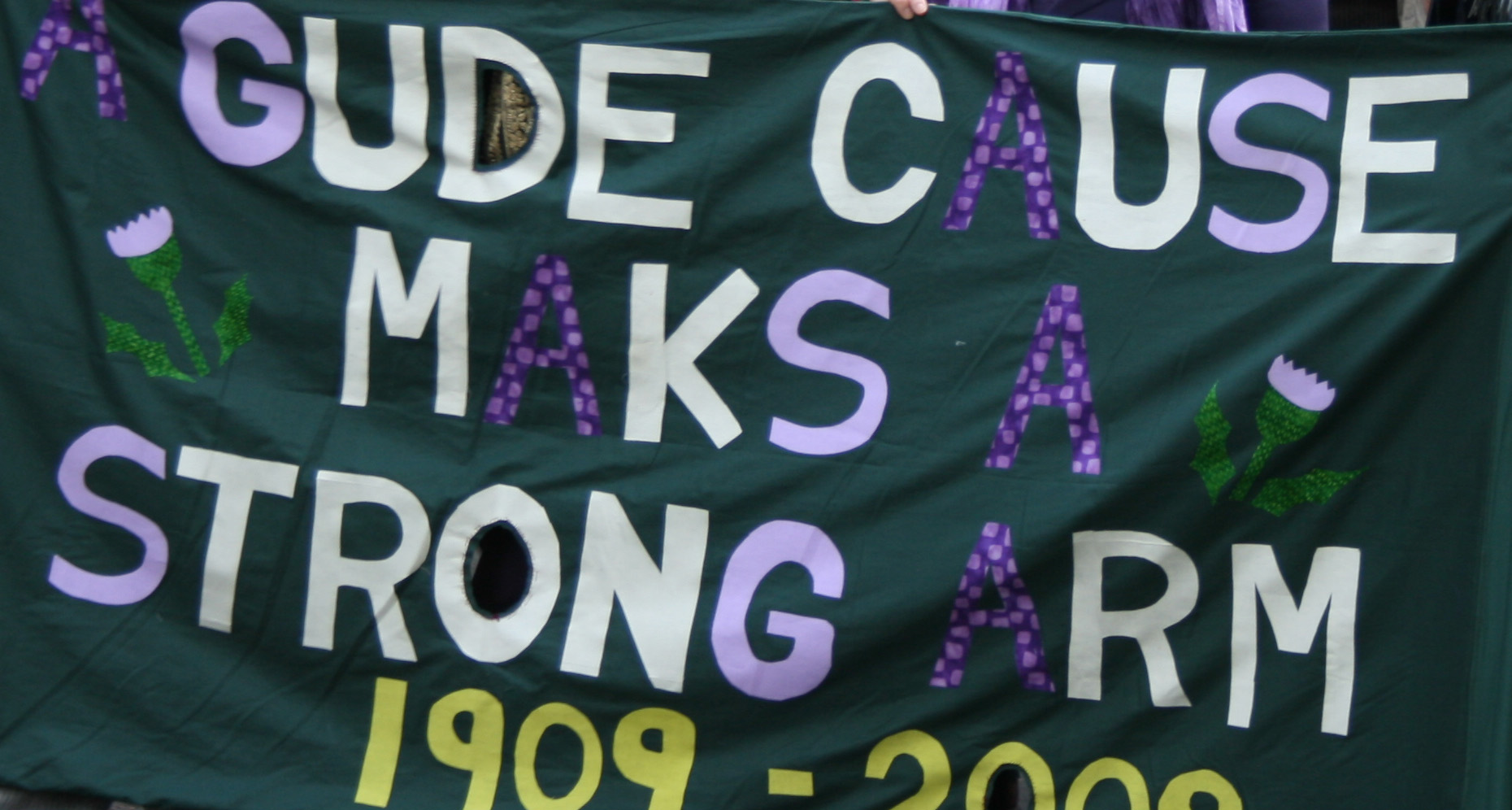
Gude Cause Banner

The plan was to recall and celebrate the courage, passion and persistence of the women's suffrage activists who, for around sixty years from 1867 until 1928, had campaigned for the vote. A key event for the movement in Scotland was the great suffrage procession through the streets of Edinburgh on 9 October 1909. It was decided it would be good to re-enact that event one hundred years on, in 2009.

Among the many of banners seen at the 1909 procession was one which read "A Gude Cause Maks a Strong Arm"; a rallying call the organisers felt was as true in 2009 as it was in 1909. And so "Gude Cause" was adopted as the name for the organisation.

The organisation's aims were to commemorate the 1909 Suffrage Parade in Edinburgh, and the importance of Scotswomen in the suffrage movement; to encourage Scotswomen to re-connect with political processes at a local, regional and national level; to celebrate all the achievements and progress made by Scotswomen during the last hundred years; and to highlight the violence, lower pay, discrimination and other inequalities which the Scottish Government's own Gender Audit of 2007 revealed still blight many women's lives in the 21st century.

The project was launched in October 2008 at the Scottish Parliament.

== 1909 Event ==
The 1909 Edinburgh Pageant, which so inspired the creation of Gude Cause, took place in the midst of great political tension on Scotland. Four key by-elections provided ideal campaigning opportunities for the suffragettes, and in the weeks leading up to the event, several women were arrested and imprisoned. Some refused to eat. Meanwhile, the constitutional campaigners were organising exhausting caravan tours the length and breadth of the country – chalking details of meetings on pavements and enduring jeers on the streets.

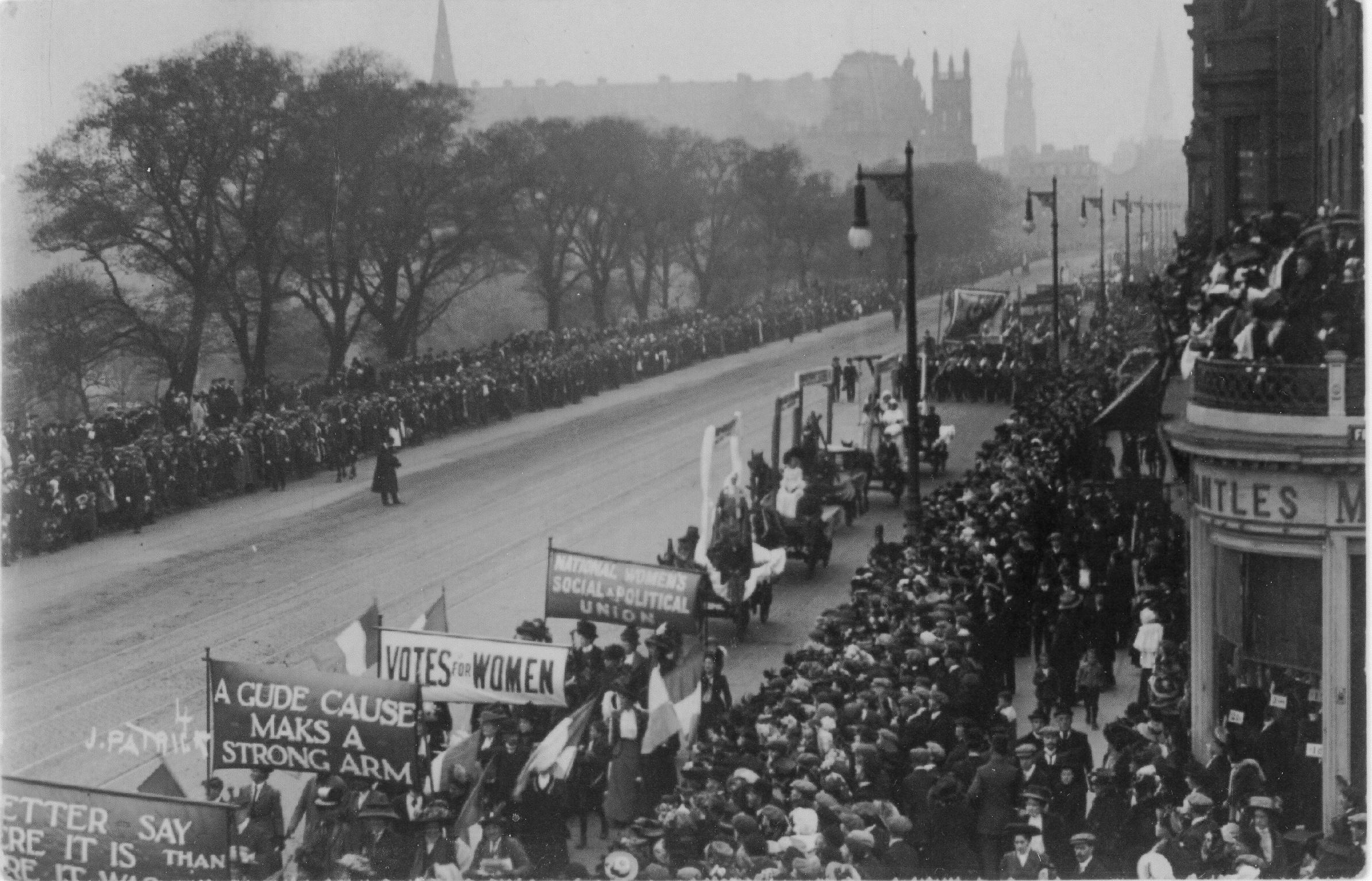
The Great Procession and Women's Demonstration 1909

The 1909 procession was organised by the Women's Social and Political Union (WSPU), who billed it as "The Great Procession and Women's Demonstration" with the theme of "What women have done and can and will do". In charge of planning, and at the helm of the procession itself, was Flora Drummond, aka 'the General', astride a horse. Playing the bagpipes was nine-year-old Bessie Watson. A "Historical Pageant" of women dressed as well-known female historical figures, including the Countess of Buchan, and groups from far & near processed along Princes Street, while a large proportion of the local population turned out to watch.

The leader of the British suffragette movement, Emmeline Pankhurst and her daughter Christabel, were keynote speakers; participants included some of the first female graduates from Edinburgh University (like Muriel Scott) and a group of fishwives from Musselburgh.

'The Edinburgh Evening Dispatch wrote of "a solid phalanx of resolute and unflinching womanhood bent upon obtaining the vote"'.

Many taking part wore the WSPU colours of white, violet, and green. Others were dressed in their graduate robes, or the attire of their profession or trade. It was a demonstration of women's recent achievements, as well as their aspirations for future equality and rights.

Edinburgh Evening Dispatch wrote in its 11 October 1909 issue, "The imposing display achieved its object. It advertised to tens of 1000s the aim and objects of the suffragettes, and it made it abundantly apparent to all who had eyes to see, ears to hear, and minds to understand, that behind this movement there is a solid phalanx of resolute and unflinching womanhood bent upon obtaining the vote, and fully determined that they will triumph over every obstacle!"

== 2009 Event ==
On Saturday 10 October 2009 5000 people paraded through Edinburgh in autumn sunshine to commemorate the work of the suffrage movement, to celebrate women's achievements in the intervening 100 years, and to re-energise women's commitment to political representation and action in Scotland. "The suffragettes wanted votes for women; these re-enactors want women to value and use the votes for which their great grannies fought".

The predominant colours were violet, green and white and many were dressed in period costume from 1909, wearing sashes and carrying banners demanding Votes for Women, reflecting the look and aims of the earlier procession, as well as banners from groups currently involved in political and social activism.

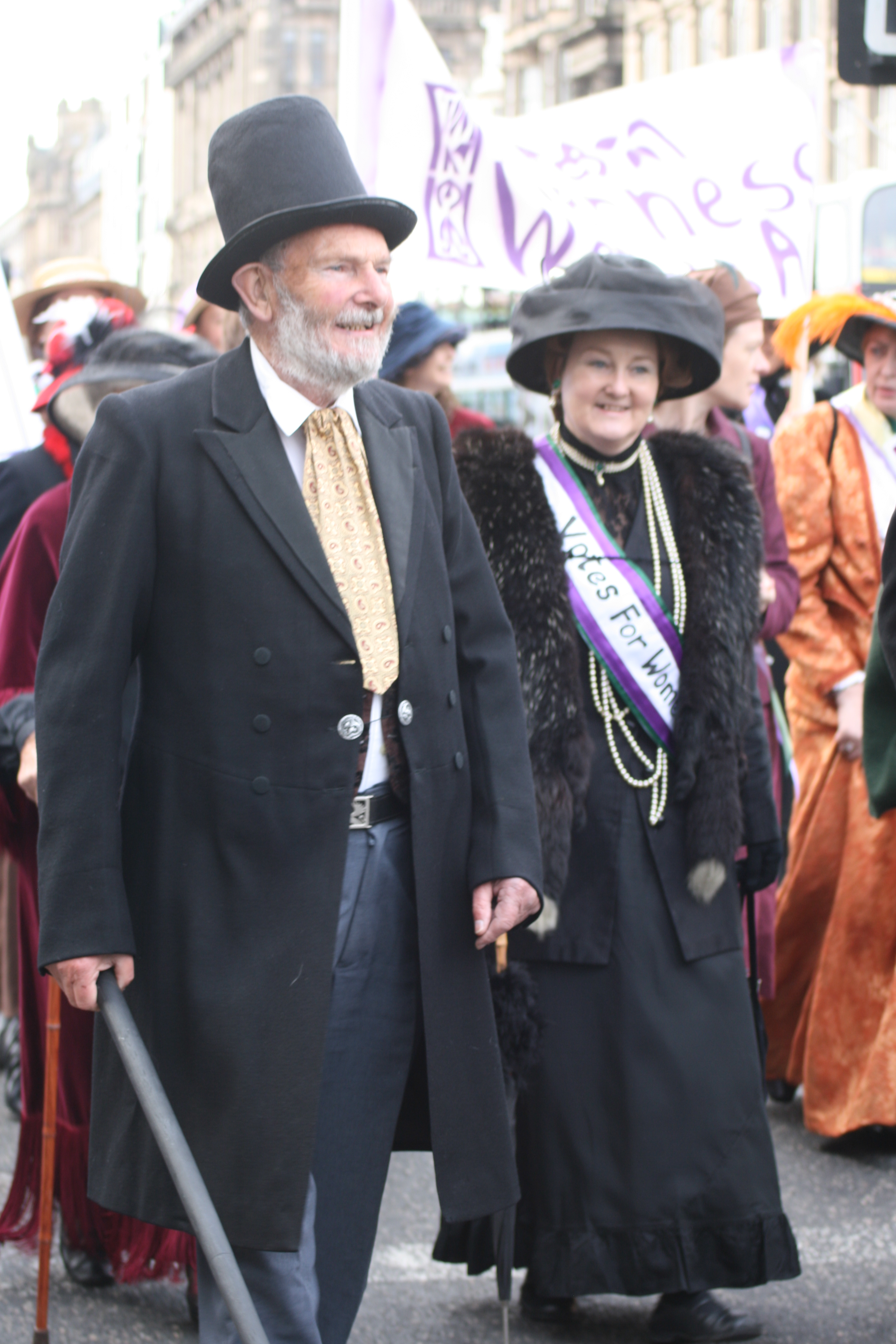
Participants in the Gude Cause Procession, Edinburgh 2009

The groups included

- Edinburgh Museums and Galleries
- Glasgow Museums
- University of the Third Age
- Soroptimists
- Women's Aid
- Glasgow Women's Library
- Scottish Youth Parliament
- Engender
- Equality Network
- Protest in Harmony (choir)
- Workers Educational Association
- Women's Voluntary Sector Network
- Women @ Work,
- Women in Black
- Women's History Scotland
- Women Artists Scotland
- Women's Engineering Society
- HIV Solidarity
- Environmental Groups
- Political Parties
- Trade Unions
- Citadel Arts Group, Leith, Edinburgh
- Africa Centre, Scotland
- University staff and students
- Youth groups and schools
- Scottish Women's Rural Institutes
- Damned Rebel Bitches

The 2009 procession assembled on Bruntsfield Links and travelled along the following route: Bruntsfield Links – Whitehouse Loan – Bruntsfield Place – Glengyle Terrace – Leven Terrace – Melville Drive – Middle Meadow Walk crossing The Meadows (park) – Forest Road – George IV Bridge – The High Street AKA The Royal Mile – North Bridge – Waterloo Place – Regent Road – Calton Hill access road – to the summit of Calton Hill. The original route had to be changed and the part along Princes Street had to be omitted because of the tram works.

The procession paused on the High Street, where Jenny Dawe, the City of Edinburgh Council leader, spoke from the Mercat cross, tracing the history of women's struggles for recognition in Edinburgh. On behalf of the City of Edinburgh Council, Jenny presented the Gude Cause Committee with a banner which was made by the City of Edinburgh Council Museum Volunteers to commemorate the occasion. MSPs, from across the political spectrum, who joined the procession included Fiona Hyslop, Sarah Boyack, Marilyn Glen, Shirley Anne Somerville and Patrick Harvie. Former MSP and MP Donald Gorrie, whose aunts Belle and Mary Gorrie played Mary Queen of Scots and Catherine Barlass in the original parade, also took part.

Councillors joined the procession at this point and walked to Calton Hill where the Minister for Education, Fiona Hyslop MSP spoke on behalf of the Scottish Government. Cathy Peattie MSP sang 'Bread and Roses', and Janet Fenton spoke about the aims, aspirations and activities of the Gude Cause movement.

== Allied organisations and initiatives ==
Gude Cause had developed a network of women's organisations to spread the word and work in partnership to promote interest in women's history and political action. Over 100 organisations provided practical and financial support. In particular, the Gude Cause committee collaborated with

- The Workers' Educational Association which organised classes throughout Scotland on historical research, banner and jewellery making, playwriting. The Citadel Arts Group based in Leith, Edinburgh collaborated with the WEA to produce a play which was performed 2008 Edinburgh Festival Fringe, What Women Want, at Riddle's Court. With support from an anonymous donor, the Citadel Arts Group produced a film based on the play. Jon Pullman has edited his footage of the play and added documentary footage to produce The Right to Vote an a' That, which was shown at the Central Library, George IV Bridge, Edinburgh in June 2013, now available for purchase from the Citadel Arts Group.
- The STUC Women's Committee, which gave both practical and financial support.
- The Educational Institute of Scotland, which produced resources focussing on suffrage issues, their Edinburgh branch running a schools' competition.
- The Museum of Edinburgh, which mounted an exhibition 'Votes for Women, the Women's Suffrage Movement in Edinburgh' which included a collection of biographies compiled by Women's History Scotland members Rose Pipes and Kath Davies. The exhibition centrepiece was the original 'Votes for Women' sash worn in 1909 by 9-year-old piper Bessie Watson and which was later chosen as one of the objects for the British Museum/BBC project, A History of the World in 100 Objects.
- Women's History Scotland members also organised an event at the Filmhouse cinema in Edinburgh, and gave various lectures and talks.

Other Gude Cause initiatives included:

- A contribution to the Festival of Politics in the Scottish Parliament,
- An 'Edinburgh Lecture' written by Helen Steven, read by Dame Helena Kennedy, chaired by Janet Fenton
- Banner-making workshops at the Glasgow Women's Library and the Workers' Educational Association in Edinburgh, amongst other places.
- A quilting project – one quilt was later exhibited at the Scottish Parliament and other venues.
- Plays and concerts
- Singing Workshops
- The publication of a 100-year timeline of Women's Suffrage, compiled by Esther Breitenbach and Lesley Orr of Women's History Scotland
- Film screenings, including 'Red Skirts on Clydeside, 'Ethel Moorhead' and 'The Work They Say is Mine'.
- The publication of a songbook – "The Right to Vote an' a' that: a Hundred years of Scottish Women Singing"
- A 'toolkit' for community and school groups studying women's suffrage history

== Gude Cause Media Project ==
One particular initiative is still ongoing. The Gude Cause Media Project (originally called the New Media Group) aims to bring together crowd-sourced photographs and videos of the event, alongside video presentations talking about Scottish women's history and the suffrage movement in Scotland.

The crowd-sourced photographs and videos are being hosted by Scran, an online resource for educational use by schools, further education, higher education, libraries, museums, and the public. Scran is part of RCAHMS, the Royal Commission on the Ancient and Historical Monuments of Scotland.

There is also a Gude Cause Group on Flickr which contains many of these images.
