= Mary Emma Macintosh =

South African suffragist

Mary Emma Macintosh (31 July 1864 - 2 December 1915) was a South African suffragist. She was the first President of the Women's Enfranchisement Association of the Union (1911–1915).

== Life ==
She studied at the Huguenot College. She married a merchant, William MacIntosh.

She was active in the Woman's Christian Temperance Union, the Guild of Loyal Women, and the Empire League.

After the foundation of the Women's Enfranchisement Association of the Union in 1911, she became the first of its two presidents.
