= Domestic violence in South Africa =

Flag of South Africa

Map of South Africa with English labels

South Africa has been recorded as having one of the highest rates of domestic violence in the world. In 2012, just over one-third of violent crimes committed against women ended in criminal prosecution. Legislation has been passed to help improve the quality of life for victims of abuse and to prevent further abuse from taking place. Although the movement against domestic violence is a relatively new movement, it has been making great strides in the country since the 1990s.

== Domestic violence ==
The South African Domestic Violence Act 1998 defines domestic violence as:

Physical abuse; sexual abuse; emotional, verbal and psychological abuse; economic abuse; intimidation; harassment; stalking; damage to property; entry into the complainant's residence without consent, where the parties do not share the same residence; or any other controlling or abusive behaviour towards a complainant, where such conduct harms, or may cause imminent harm to, the safety, health or wellbeing of the complainant.

== Background ==
The South African Medical Council released a study in 1998 saying that out of the 1,394 men interviewed, 50% physically abused their female partners at their homes. Considering how recently domestic violence has come to light, it is still considered an early movement. The United Nations found that violence against women was a universal problem. Another study done in 2010 found that a majority of men and over half of women that were surveyed believed that women should obey their husbands. It is not uncommon for the abuse to begin while the girls are still teenagers. It is not uncommon for women to tolerate the abuse they are receiving because it is such a common practice in South Africa.

Understanding the prevalence of domestic violence in South Africa requires understanding how it the topic viewed and discussed in the country. Gender based violence is often under-reported, and when it is reported, victim blaming is common. Reporters and newspapers use suggestive syntax such as "headlines that read ‘a woman has been raped’ rather than stating ‘a man has raped a woman’". The justice system is also known to be biased against women due to common social expectations of men exerting power over women in both public and private spheres. A study surveyed 10,000 people in South Africa on gender based violence and the statistics show the staggering imbalance in power between men and women. The study reported 70% of men believing women should obey their husbands, 15% of men believing a husband has "the right to “punish” his wife for wrongdoings", and 23% of men reporting a wife should never be allowed to refuse sex with her husband. This study reinforces a lot of traditional gender norms that are prevalent globally. However, efforts to combat this epidemic of violence are being made by the South African government, for example legal actions listed below such as the 2024 National Council on Gender-Based and Femicides is a large step made to try and prevent these types of statistics from rising.

== Prevalence ==
In a study done by the World Health Organization, it was found that 60,000 women and children are victims of domestic violence in South Africa. It is hard to gather accurate statistical data in South Africa because domestic violence is rarely reported. On average, in a cross-sectional study conducted in 2002, the women who were abused came from a lower secondary education and were unemployed. The same study indicated that 9.5 percent of women reported being abused within the past year (working back from 2002); in some areas of the country it rose to 28.4 percent of women who reported being abused. In 2013, 50 percent of the women surveyed reported that they had suffered emotional and verbal abuse. Of the women who were in violent relationships, 45.9 percent of them reported injury. In the same study it was found that typically the women who do witness and feel the violence come from a rural childhood compared to those raised in an urban area. Although there are many places that do offer help to those suffering from domestic violence, those resources are more available in urban areas. In rural areas it is harder to access proper resources. Nearly half of the female murders that happened in 1999 in South Africa resulted from domestic violence.

South Africa 2011 population density map

In the first ever study conducted by the South African Human Sciences Research Council in 2024, entitled "National Gender-Based Violence Prevalence Study", all nine provinces of South Africa were studied and the findings revealed that there are racial associations in who experiences more violence. The study reported that Black South African women were more likely to experience physical violence with 35.5% of these women having already experienced it. There were also social factors that affected people who were more likely to experience sexual violence. Married women were least likely to experience sexual violence but still 8.5% had and women who cohabited together, but were not married, were more likely to with 14.9% having experienced it. However, cohabiting unmarried women were extremely likely to experience physical violence with 43.4% experiencing it.

Recent research has found there are socio-cultural factors that are connected to partner violence. For example, binge drinking was associated with intimate partner violence perpetration and problematic alcohol use can be a predictor of intimate partner violence and domestic violence. Additionally, men with a history of exposure to violence were more likely to have difficulty with self-control as it relates to violence towards a partner in certain situations compared to men without a history of exposure to violence.

== Rape and Sexually Transmitted Diseases ==
In 2012 South Africa was called the "rape capital of the world" when less than 1% of rapes that occur are reported to the police. The South African Medical Research Council did an electronic anonymous survey, interviewing just over 1,700 men, that found that one in four males had raped; 73% of those men surveyed had raped before the age of 20. In the first quarter of 2022, a police report found that there had been 10,818 rape cases reported in merely three months. More than half of these rape cases took place in the victim's home and in most cases the rapist was someone the victim knew. It is also important to note that these statistics don't accurately represent the number of rapes in South Africa in quarter one of 2022, because many cases go completely unreported, meaning these numbers are an underestimation.

South Africa also holds one of the highest rates for HIV. This rate is attributed to a multitude of biosocial factors such as lack of condom use, multiple sex partners and power imbalances between genders. The National Library of Medicine conducted a study that reported 231,000 new cases of HIV in 2017 alone. 121,900 of those were female cases and 109,200 were male. The National Library of Medicine also reported 7.9 million people in South Africa living with HIV. This epidemic is stimulated by adolescents being involved in age inappropriate relations, which are distinguished as "age-disparate relationships" usually between young women and older men. These relations are perpetuated by gender norms and power dynamics prevalent in Africa, such as patriarchal views of gender roles.

In Limpopo, a team of researches traveled to rural villages to implement a three-part trial to test if intervention within relationships that had domestic violence and/ or HIV prevalence in the home. The homes where the researchers just assisted with the proautogenerated1blems of domestic violence were able to reduce the prevalence by 55%, but did not effect those who had unprotected sexual intercourse with a non-spousal partner. Although the rate of domestic violence within these small villages did get reduced; the rate of those having unprotected intercourse after being exposed, and diagnosed with HIV, did not go down.

According to a report by the U.N., South Africa had one of the highest prevalence of HIV/AIDS in the world in 2009.

== Legal actions ==
Until South Africa established non-racial democracy in the 1990s, no law to define domestic violence or protect those who are victims of domestic violence ever existed. Within South Africa, the 1996 Constitution says in section 12c that: "Everyone has the right to freedom and security of person, that includes the right to be free from violence from either public and private sources." The constitution also takes time to highlight that South Africa is based on "non-sexism" values.

Many successful policies have been put in place to help, mostly women, find help escape or refuge from the violence. Human rights throughout the world have viewed sexual violence as a negative situation. After the United Nations held multiple human rights conventions (including the World Conference on Human Rights (1993), International Conference on Population and Development (1994), and the Fourth World Conference on Women (1995) the global agenda for violence against women changed. The advocacy group Soul City broadcast a show on TV and radio in 1995 that highlighted the issues associated with domestic violence. Soul City, along with the National Network on Violence against Women, set up a 24-hour crisis telephone line to help vulnerable women who are struggling with domestic violence.

=== Domestic Violence Act ===
In 1998, South Africa introduced the Domestic Violence Act to try and protect those who are being abused or might be forced into a situation that could become harmful in the future. At the time, the biggest assistance to women came from the Protection Order that derives from the Domestic Violent Act. The Protection Order permits the courts to prevent the accused from continuing abuse. The collaboration process between representatives of the Department of Justice, Safety and Security, Health Education, Welfare, Correctional Services and the National Directorate for Public Prosecution was a delaying factor that slowed down the process of changing the policies. Within the first year of the Domestic Violence Act being created, 1,696 applications were submitted for protective orders. In a report done by the United Nations Division of the Advancement of Women, they discovered about the protective orders that women were able to fill out, that the forms were only available in two out of the eleven languages that are spoken in South Africa. Other reforms that were created were to sentence mandatory minimal time for specific types of rape under the Criminal Law Amendment Act 1997.

=== National Council on Gender-Based Violence and Femicide Act ===
In 2024, the President of South Africa, Cyril Ramaphosa, passed the bill that would create a National Council on Gender-Based Violence and Femicides. The bill stipulates femicides to be defined as the killing of a female or anyone that identifies as a female done by a romantic partner, by someone with a personal relationship, or any person. The bill defines gender-based violence as any action of violence related to gender, including physical, sexual, verbal, emotional, economic, domestic, educational or psychological abuse that could occur in both public or private life. This Council will act as a board of appointed officials who will work towards "providing strategic leadership on the elimination of gender-based violence and femicide in South Africa". The Minister of South Africa and this Council will work alongside each other to create action plans to help prevent further gender-based violence. The Council will be expected to meet with the Minister at least four times a year to go over performance and functionality of any implemented programs. There is also a Chief Executive Officer on this council who will oversee all operations in place.

== Department of Women, Youth, and Persons with Disabilities ==
South Africa's government has made strides towards decreasing domestic violence rates through the creation of an agency that focuses on helping to prevent domestic violence statewide. The Department of Women, Youth, and Persons with Disabilities is characterized as an inclusive society with the goals of creating a country with equality and preventing discrimination when possible. The mission statement of this department is to empower women, young people, and people with any disabilities, as well as stimulating advocacy and socio-cultural changes throughout South African communities.

Within this department, the formulation of the Gender-based Violence and Femicide National Strategic Plan (GBVF-NSP) was undertaken in April 2019. This strategic plan was created in order to make an organized national response to the gender based violence issues that have been so prevalent in South Africa. This response team has collaborated with international organizations such as UN Women and UNAIDS in order to make a cohesive and effective response with the support of major groups.

== Presidential Summit Against Gender-Based Violence & Femicide Declaration ==
In 2018, a Presidential Summit was held in South Africa on November 1 and 2 in Pretoria. President Cyril Ramaphosa in 2018 declared on International Women's Day that this summit would be held to connect civil society with the government in order to strive to put an end to gender-based violence. This summit was in response to marches conducted by women in South Africa. On August 1, 2018, a march was held in every province of South Africa. Therefore, in South Africa this summit is considered historical to its citizens because it is a result of the government listening directly to the demands of citizens.

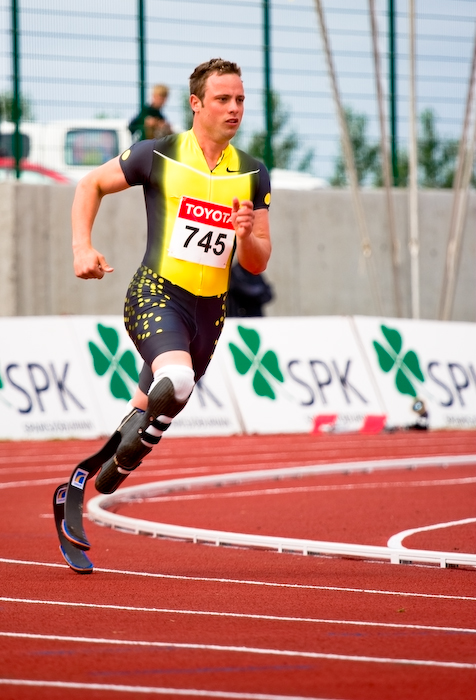
Oscar Pistorius

== Notable cases of domestic violence in South Africa ==
=== Oscar Pistorius ===
Oscar Pistorius was accused and charged with murdering his girlfriend on February 14, 2013. The "Blade Runner", as he is known, shot 30-year-old model Reeva Steenkamp through the bathroom door of their home with a 9mm pistol he said he kept under his bed. Oscar Pistorius, who was 27 years old at the time of the shooting, stated that he believed it was an intruder in the bathroom, and not his girlfriend, after hearing the sound of the window being opened. The couple had been in a relationship since 2012 after attending an award show together. Pistorius’ previous girlfriend, model Samantha Taylor, was put on the stand during the trial to testify about Pistorius' gun use prior to the February 14 shooting. In Taylor's statement, she described Pistorius always having his gun with him, even when visiting friends, and frequently waking up during the night in fear about potential intruders. The prosecutors also believe that Pistorius had shot Steenkamp because of arguments they had had earlier that day.

=== Charlize Theron ===
Actress Charlize Theron grew up in a home where she witnessed such abuse. She is known for starring in various films such as: Italian Job, Snow White and the Huntsman, and Hancock. Theron grew up outside Johannesburg with her parents. Theron's father was an alcoholic and threatened her and her mother one night. During that incident, Theron's mother shot and killed the father, but was not charged because it was ruled as self-defence.

=== Trevor Noah ===
Talk show host Trevor Noah grew up in a household where his mother faced abuse. In 2009, his step-father pleaded guilty to attempting to murder his mother. Noah highlighted corruption within the police system, claiming that his mother had reached out for years to police for help, but that dockets went missing and cases never went to court.

== See also ==
- Women in South Africa
- Crime in South Africa
