= Women's Enfranchisement Association of the Union =

Women's Enfranchisement Association of the Union (WEAU) was a women's organization in South Africa, founded in 1911. It was the first women's suffrage organization in South Africa, as well as the main women's suffrage organization in South Africa, and played a major role in the campaign for women's suffrage.

== History ==
=== Background and foundation ===
Women's movement in South Africa began with the organization of the Women's Christian Temperance Union of the Cape Colony (WCTU) in 1889. The temperance movement supported women's suffrage because of the conviction that women would vote to ban or restrict alcohol, and in 1895, Julia Solly founded a women's suffrage section within the WCTU, which was the start point of the women's suffrage struggle in South Africa.

In 1902, the Women's Enfranchisement League (WEL) was founded in Durban as the first exclusive women's suffrage organisation in South Africa. After a number of local organisations was founded and a tour by Carrie Chapman Catt, the local groups were all united to form the Women's Enfranchisement Association of the Union (WEAU) which became a member of the British Dominions Women's Suffrage Union as well as the International Woman Suffrage Alliance.

=== Activity ===
The WEAU presented petitions to the Parliament of the National Convention in 1908–1909, 1912, 1920, 1921 and 1929. It published its own organ, the Woman's Outlook (1912-1922) and the Flashlight (1927-1930). The WEAU wished for women's vote on the same terms as men, which differed between the provinces and in some cases included also non-white women.

The majority of the members of the WEAU were white English elite women. White Afrikaner women did not engage in the women's movement because of the disapproval of the powerful Dutch Reformed Church. Black women, were active within the ANC to fight racial segregation rather than involved in the women's movement. Because of this, the members were few; they were about 4,000 in 1918, and never became much more than that.

=== Closure ===
The South African government, with the approval of the British, ignored the issue and maintained status quo by referring to the complicated political situation of the unification of the South African provinces. In 1923, however, the Afrikaner population along with the National Party changed its attitude in favor of women's suffrage for white women, because it wished to enlarge the number of white voters. This changed the demands of the WEAU, who conformed to the demand which the government was willing to meet: that of suffrage for exclusively white women. When the petition of 1929 was presented, therefore, it was treated favorably by the government, which resulted in the introduction of Women's Enfranchisement Act, 1930.

== Presidents and notable supporters ==
=== Presidents ===
- Mary Emma Macintosh, 1911-1915
- Vacant, 1915-1916
- Barbara Steel, 1916-1930

=== Supporters ===
- Nokukhanya Bhengu
- Charlotte Maxeke
- Katie Stuart (reformer)

== See also ==
- Feminism in South Africa
