= Water of Leith Walkway =

Footpath in City of Edinburgh, Scotland

Coordinates: 55°53′9.73″N 3°20′23.31″W

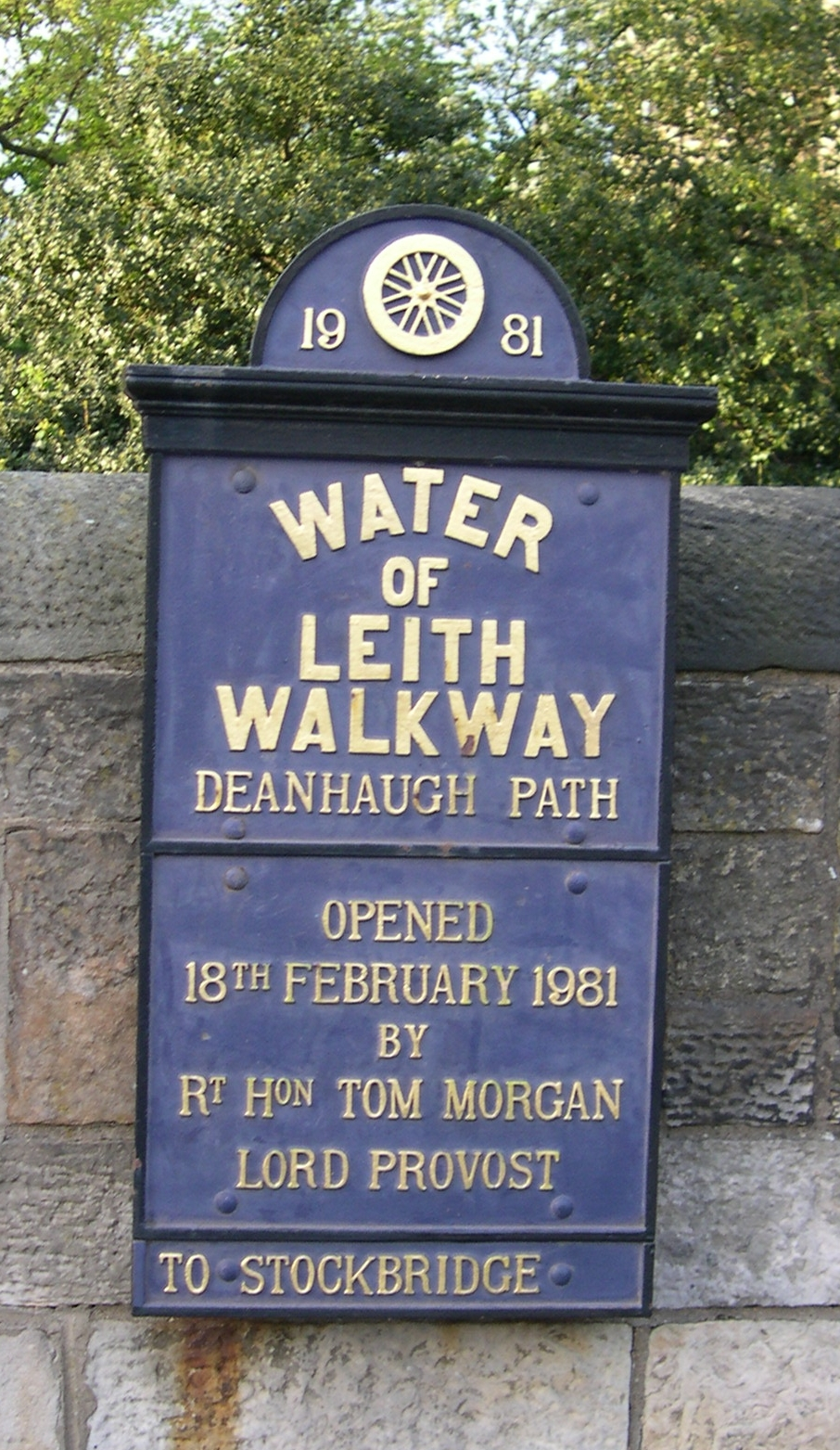
One of many signposts

The Water of Leith Walkway is a public footpath and cycleway that runs alongside the river of the same name through Edinburgh, Scotland, from Balerno to Leith.

== History ==
The Water of Leith (river) was at the heart of the industrial development of Edinburgh in the 19th century, the river being used to power paper, flour and fabric mills.

The concept of a public path first appeared in 1949, but the necessary construction work was not begun until 1973. The walkway was laid out in stages. The section of the footpath between Juniper Green and Slateford was opened to the public on 30 August 1973. A section near Dean Village was completed in 1977 using labour from a job creation programme. In 1988, the Water of Leith Conservation Trust became involved in the maintenance of the walkway. In 2012 a landslip between Dean Path and Sunbury Bridge caused that section of the walkway to be closed. Remedial works failed and subsequent legal liability disputes delayed the section's reopening until May 2022.

== Route ==
The path runs from Balerno, south west of Edinburgh city centre to Leith on the Firth of Forth, 12 miles (19 km) to the north east. The path runs downhill, but the incline is so slight that it is barely perceptible. Approximately half a mile of the route is on roads; for the remainder the path runs alongside the Water of Leith, and away from traffic. The path surface is a mixture of tarmac, compressed grit and compressed earth. The route is signposted and well used by both pedestrians and cyclists.

=== Balerno to Slateford ===
At Balerno the walkway begins next to Balerno High School. The section from Balerno to Slateford utilises the dismantled Balerno railway line and forms part of National Cycle Route 75. Leaving Balerno the walkway crosses the river on a former railway bridge before passing through the site of Currie railway station in the village of Currie. The path recrosses the Water of Leith and continues through the site of Juniper Green railway station in Juniper Green then passes underneath the A720 Edinburgh City Bypass. After reaching Colinton and its former railway station the walkway departs the riverbank at Spylaw Park, rounds Spylaw House, built for 18th century merchant and philanthropist James Gillespie and shortly after enters the 140-metre (150 yd) Colinton tunnel. The tunnel walls are decorated by an extensive mural inspired by the Robert Louis Stephenson poem From a Railway Carriage. The mural, a community project led by artist Chris Rutterford assisted by local volunteers and schoolchildren, was completed in October 2020. The path emerges from the tunnel into Colinton Dell, a steep-sided wooded gorge, which is a haven for wildlife. Craiglockhart Dell follows on. The Water of Leith Visitor Centre is reached after the A70 Lanark Road. In close proximity, the pathway passes beneath the Slateford Aqueduct and the Slateford Viaduct, which carry the Union Canal and the Glasgow to Edinburgh via Shotts railway line across the Water of Leith respectively.

=== Slateford to Leith ===
The path crosses Saughton Park in Stenhouse, then skirts round Murrayfield Stadium, the home of Scotland Rugby Union and on through Roseburn Park. After the Coltbridge Viaduct, footbridges cross the Water of Leith to the Scottish National Gallery of Modern Art. The next locality is Dean Village, the path then passes below the Thomas Telford-designed Dean Bridge. To the north of Edinburgh city centre the walkway passes through Stockbridge, Canonmills and Bonnington. The route finishes at the Victoria Swing Bridge at the entrance to Leith Docks.

== Points of interest ==
Highlights of the walkway include:

- Antony Gormley statues, in various locations between the National Gallery of Modern Art and Leith Docks.
- St Bernard's well, with a neoclassical temple designed by Alexander Nasmyth.
- Dean Village
- Views across the Water of Leith river of the Scottish National Gallery of Modern Art, and Modern Two (formerly named the Dean Gallery.
- Colinton Tunnel, with its 140 metres (460 ft) mural.
