= Balerno =

Village near Edinburgh, Scotland

Coordinates: 55.88518°N 3.337526°W

Balerno: Scottish Gaelic: Baile Àirneach
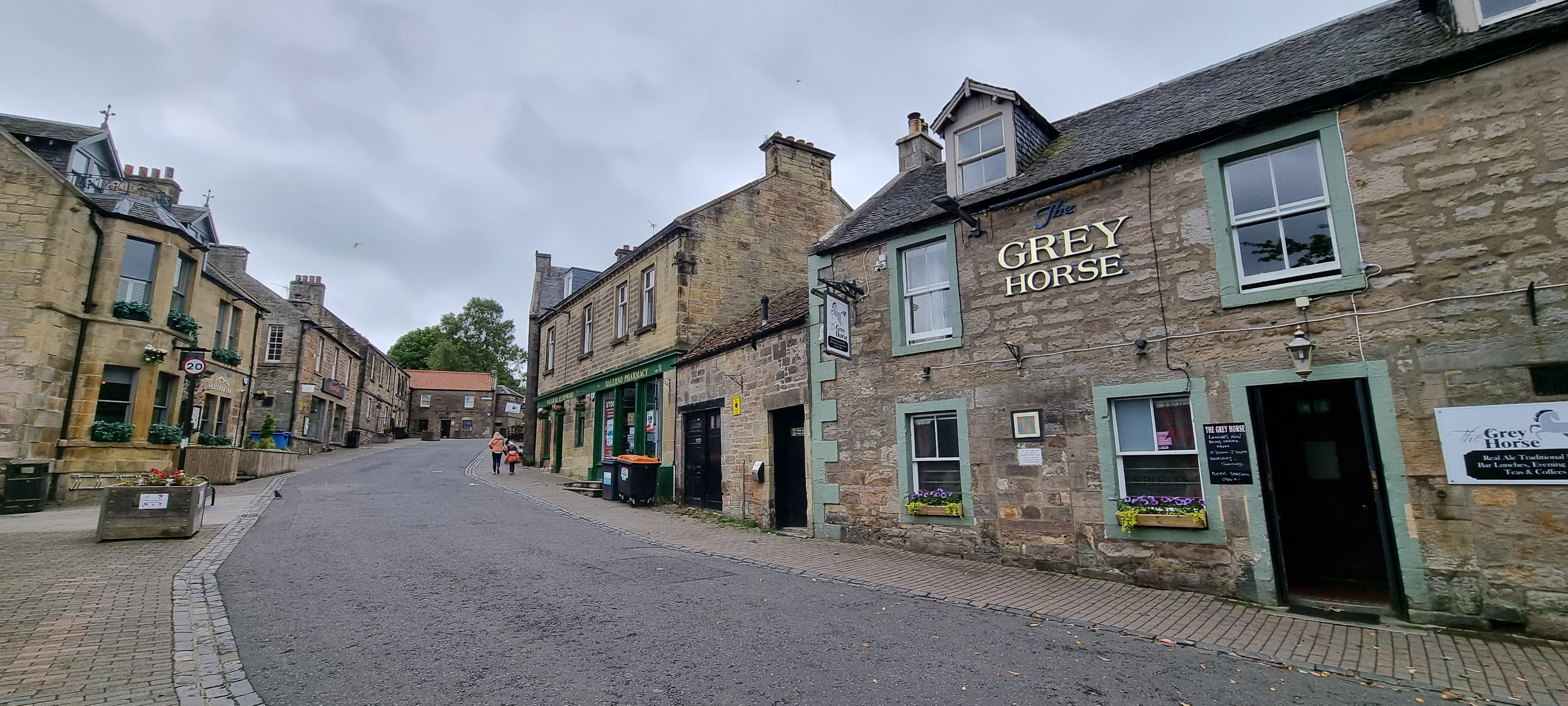
- Main St, Balerno

- Location within the City of Edinburgh council area Location within Scotland
- Population: 5,486 (2011 Census)
- OS grid reference: NT165665
- Council area: City of Edinburgh
- Country: Scotland
- Sovereign state: United Kingdom
- Post town: BALERNO
- Postcode district: EH15
- Dialling code: 0131
- Police: Scotland
- Fire: Scottish
- Ambulance: Scottish
- UK Parliament: Edinburgh South West
- Scottish Parliament: Edinburgh Pentlands

Balerno (/bəˈlɜːrnoʊ/) is a village on the outskirts of Edinburgh, Scotland situated 8 miles (13 kilometres) south-west of the city centre, next to Currie and then Juniper Green. Traditionally in the county of Midlothian it now administratively falls within the jurisdiction of the City of Edinburgh Council. The village lies at the confluence of the Water of Leith and the Bavelaw Burn. In the 18th and 19th century, the area was home to several mills using waterpower. In the 20th century, the mills closed and the village now forms a residential suburb of Edinburgh,

== History ==
Balerno's name derives from the Scottish Gaelic Baile Àirneag, meaning "townland/town of the sloe trees". The earliest written records of Balhernoch or Balernach are found in the late 13th century.

The 18th century brought substantial development to the area, with several new flax, snuff and paper mills springing up around the Water of Leith and its tributary, the Bavelaw Burn (evidence of flax production can be seen in Harlaw Woods). The largest of these mills was the Balerno Bank Paper Mill which was located near the centre of the old village. The Balerno Bank Paper Mill was founded in 1810 and closed in the early 1990s. While the former site has been converted to housing, the former offices (built in a Scottish baronial style) and lodge are still extant. They are Category B and C listed respectively. On the eastern edge of Barlerno, the Malleny Mill was built in 1805 as a flax mill. It was later used as a grain mill but was damaged by fire internally in 1910. It repaired in 1920 and converted into a ladies school. It is now housing but is Category C listed and the mills give their name to this area of Balerno. In 1825, a Scotch whisky distillery was established in Balerno but it was short-lived and closed by 1830.

In the 19th century, the village expanded with most of the present day stone buildings on the Main St dating from this period. These include the Grey Horse Inn (circa 1850), the late 19th century Malleny Arms Hotel (now the Balerno Inn), the Balerno Hardware and Pharmacy Buildings, as well as the buildings at 28-32 and 34 Main Street. In 1877, a primary school 'Deanpark' was built in the village. While the school moved to a new building in 1970, the original school, school Masters building and late annexes still exist and the spired Bell-cot is a focal point of the centre of the village. The school was expanded on at least 3 occasions between 1880 and 1914 and the main building now serves as the village library.

After the First World War house building began in earnest in the area and since then residential development has increased ahead of commercial and industrial development. There was a short loop railway running over what is now the Water of Leith Walkway. In 1938, the Royal Bank of Scotland building was erected in the village. It is category C listed and the building is now in use as a dentists.

From 1951 onwards, Balerno was expanded with the creation of a new housing estate under the builders Mactaggart & Mickel. In 1975, the village became part of the city of Edinburgh. Also in 1975, part of the village was designated as a conservation area (with the boundaries enlarged in 1997). In 1997, the village erected a memorial to a local resident Willie Shanks (BEM) for services to the people and children of Balerno.

== Governance ==
=== Local ===
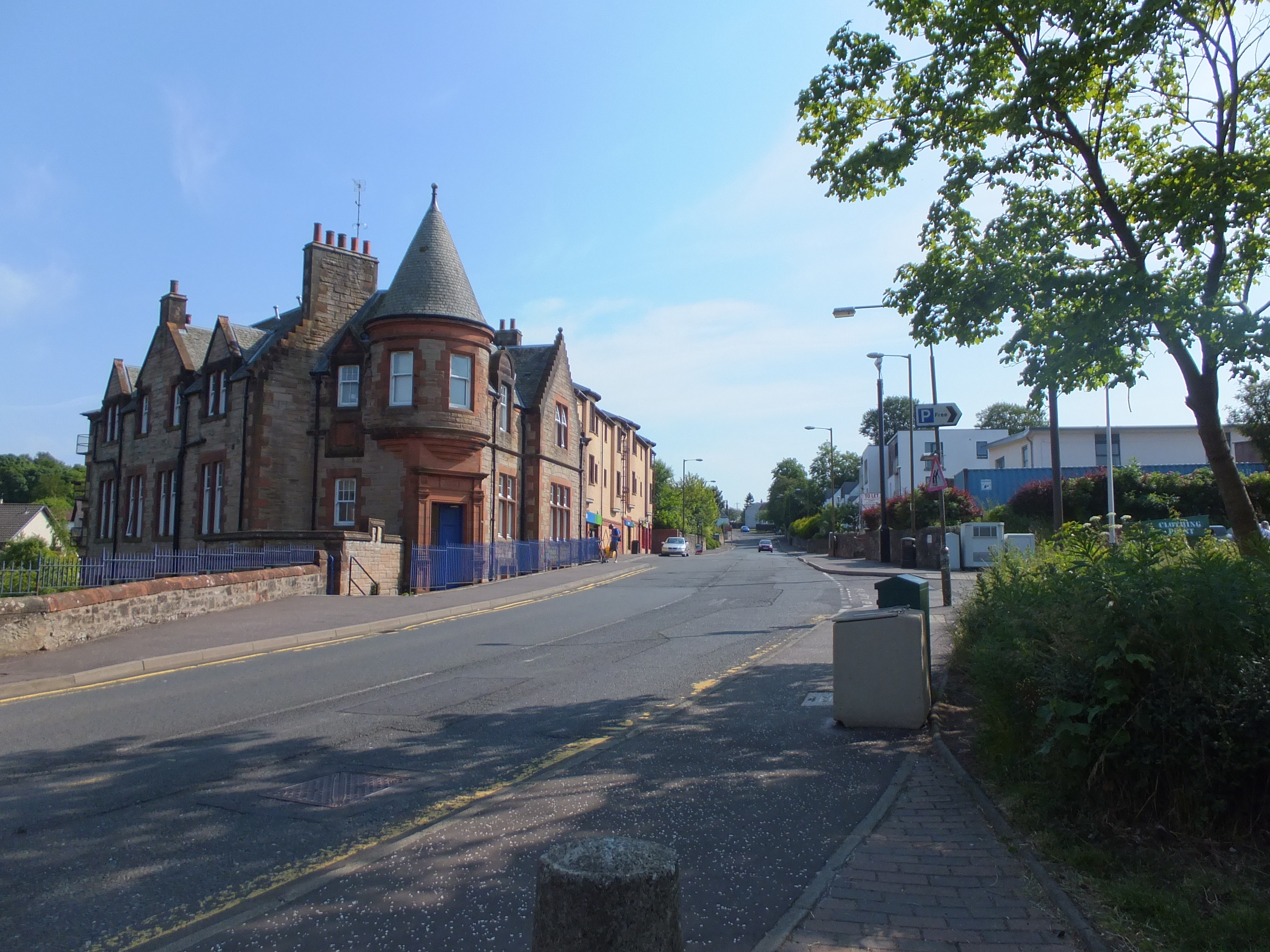
Bavelaw Road in Balerno with the former Balerno Bank Paper Mill offices on the left

Balerno is governed by the City of Edinburgh Council and is also served by a local community council.

=== Scottish Parliament ===
Balerno is in the Edinburgh Pentlands constituency for the Scottish Parliament and the Member of the Scottish Parliament is Gordon MacDonald. Balerno is also covered by the Lothian electoral region which gives the area seven additional MSPs.

=== House of Commons ===
Balerno is represented within the constituency of Edinburgh South West in the House of Commons. The current Member of Parliament (MP) is Scott Arthur (elected July 2024).

== Culture and community ==
=== Malleny House and gardens ===
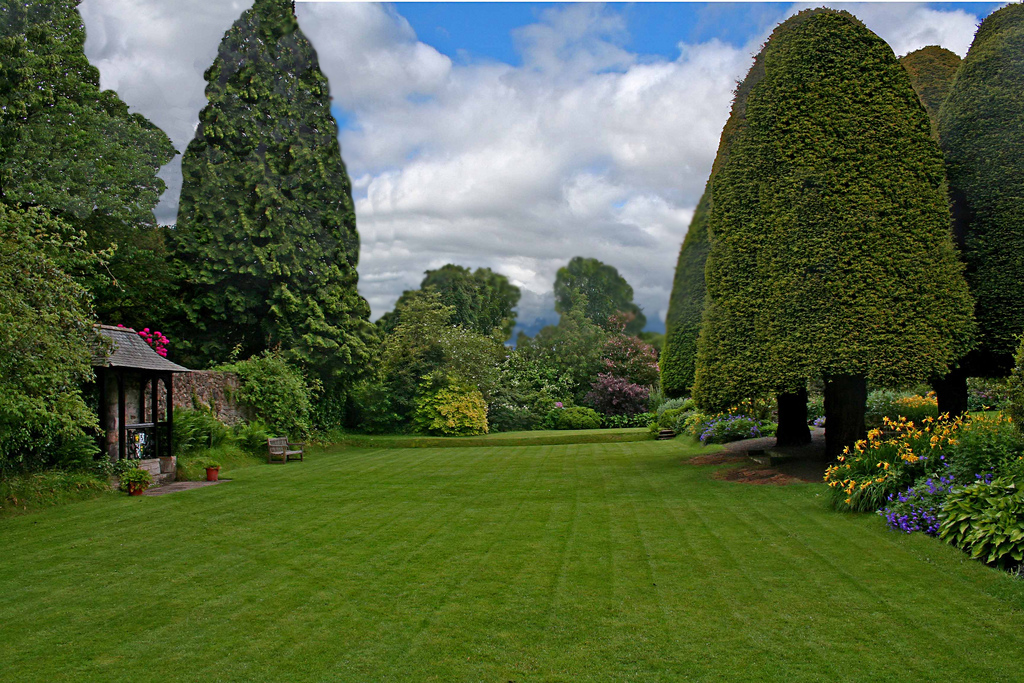
Malleny Gardens is owned by the National Trust for Scotland

The 17th century Malleny House and Garden are owned by the National Trust for Scotland. The house incorporates parts of an early house dated to 1589. It is thought that Sir James Murray of Kilbaberton was the designer of the main house building. While the house is not open to the public the gardens are and consist of a three-acre (1.2-hectare) walled garden set in approximately nine acres (3.6 hectares) of woodland. The gardens feature four 100-year-old yew trees known as the Four Apostles and was home to Scotland's National Bonsai Collection, which left around 2000 and is now located at Binny Plants near Ecclesmachan. The gardens are home to one of the largest rose collections in Scotland.

=== Scottish SPCA ===
The Scottish Society for the Prevention of Cruelty to Animals operates an Animal Rescue and Rehoming Centre on Mansfield Rd in Balerno. The SSPCA opened the centre in 1930 as a Rest Farm for working horses. The centre cares for and rehomes thousands of neglected and mistreated animals every year.

=== Farmers market ===
A farmers' market is held in Balerno Main Street on the second Saturday of each month. The Balerno Farmers Market is run by Balerno Village Trust.

=== Balerno Village Screen ===
2013 saw the launch of Balerno Village Screen – a community cinema project with free admission and funded by donations. The screenings are shown monthly on the first Saturday of every month in the Ogston Hall and the St Joseph's Centre. So far around 400 villagers have turned out per screening to watch the films.

=== Music festival ===
2008 saw the launch of Balerno's music festival with events held at Balerno Parish Church, Balerno Bowling Club, Balerno Parish Church New Hall, the Grey Horse Inn and the St Joseph's Centre.

=== Red Moss wildlife reserve ===
Red Moss is one of only four raised bogs of sphagnum moss surviving in the Lothians and is a Site of Special Scientific Interest. It is currently managed by the Scottish Wildlife Trust.

=== Balerno Children's Gala ===
Every year in may the Balerno Children's Gala association comes together to organise a float parade and a celebration usually in the Malleny Park pitches (owned by the Currie chieftains rugby club), which consists of many different activities for children and adults.

== Transport ==
=== Historical ===
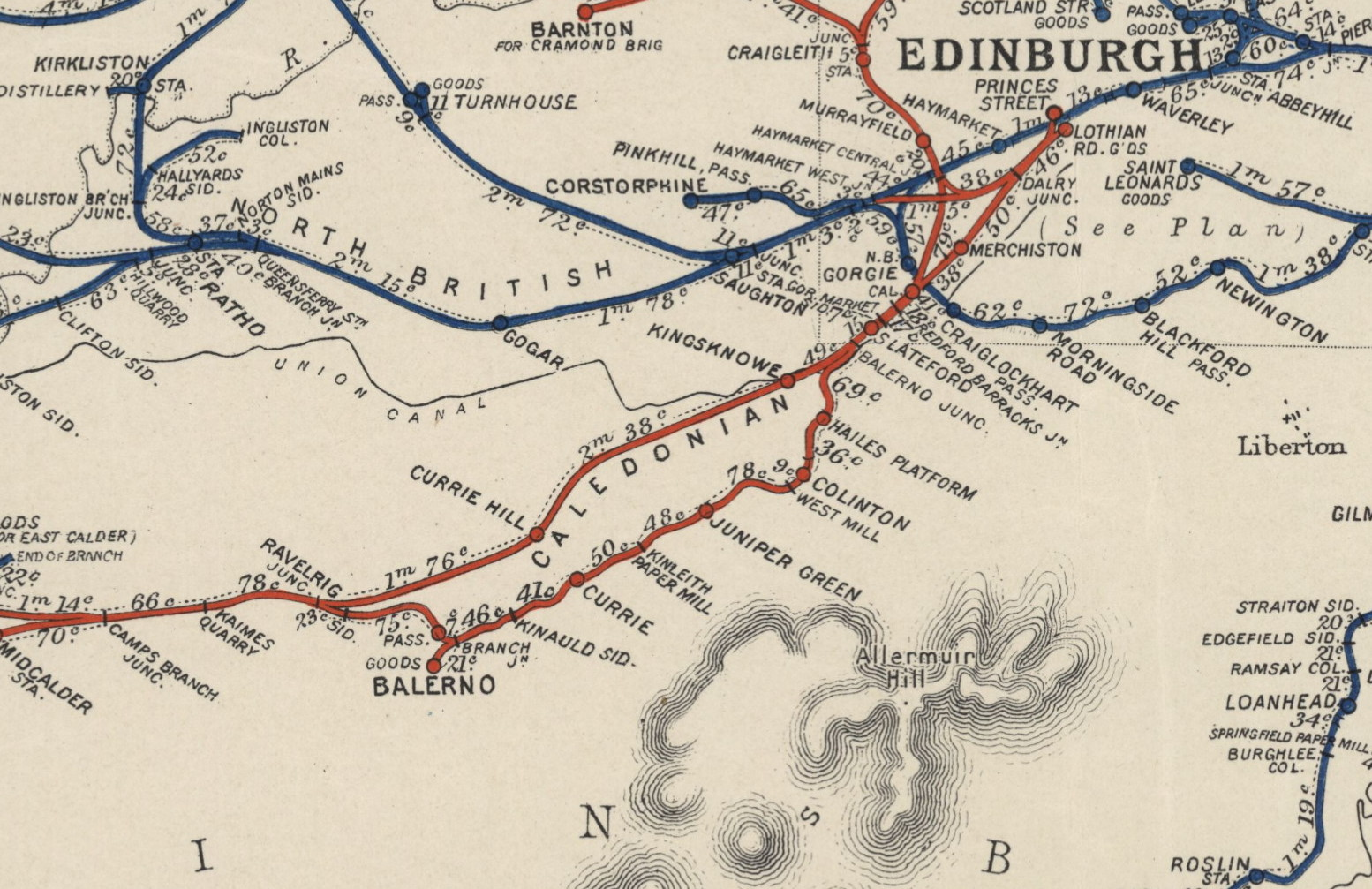
The Balerno Line on a 1915 map

The Caledonian Railway built the Balerno line, a spur line from Slateford, via Colinton, which connected Balerno railway station to the centre of Edinburgh. The line saw an upsurge in housebuilding in Balerno. The last passenger train to run on the line was in 1943, and a High School was placed on the site of the goods station in 1983. The line runs adjacent to the Water of Leith river.

=== Present day ===
The A70 runs near the village. The village is serviced by the 32 bus route to Cramond and the 44 to Wallyford, both of which is operated by Lothian Buses. The route connects Balerno to Currie, Slateford, the City Centre, Brunstane and East Lothian. The village was also served by the E&M Horsburgh service 24 bus route, which connected it to Juniper Green in one direction and East Calder and Livingston, but this has been terminated.

== Education ==
Balerno Community High School provides secondary education for local children of S1 to A6 age groups and was founded in 1983.

Dean Park Primary School is the local primary school and is located in the south of Balerno. The current school was built in 1972.

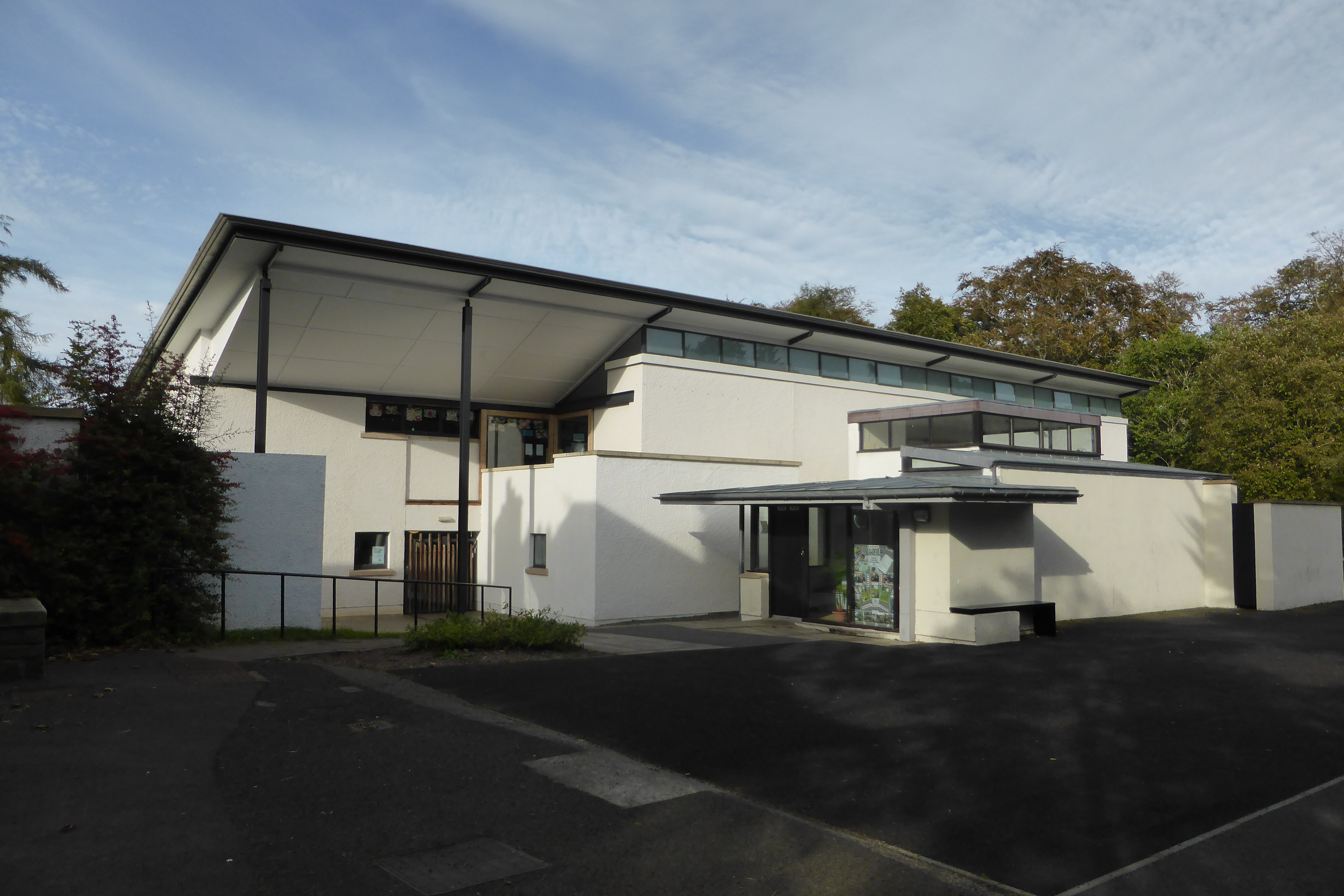
Harmeny School in Balerno

Harmeny School is a grant-aided special school for primary school aged children with social, emotional and behavioural difficulties that was established in 1958. As well as new buildings, part of the school occupies the former Mansfield House, a Category B listed Scottish Arts and Crafts style house. The house was designed by Dunn & Findlay in 1898 and then substantially altered between 1906/1907 by Robert Lorimer.

== Religious sites ==
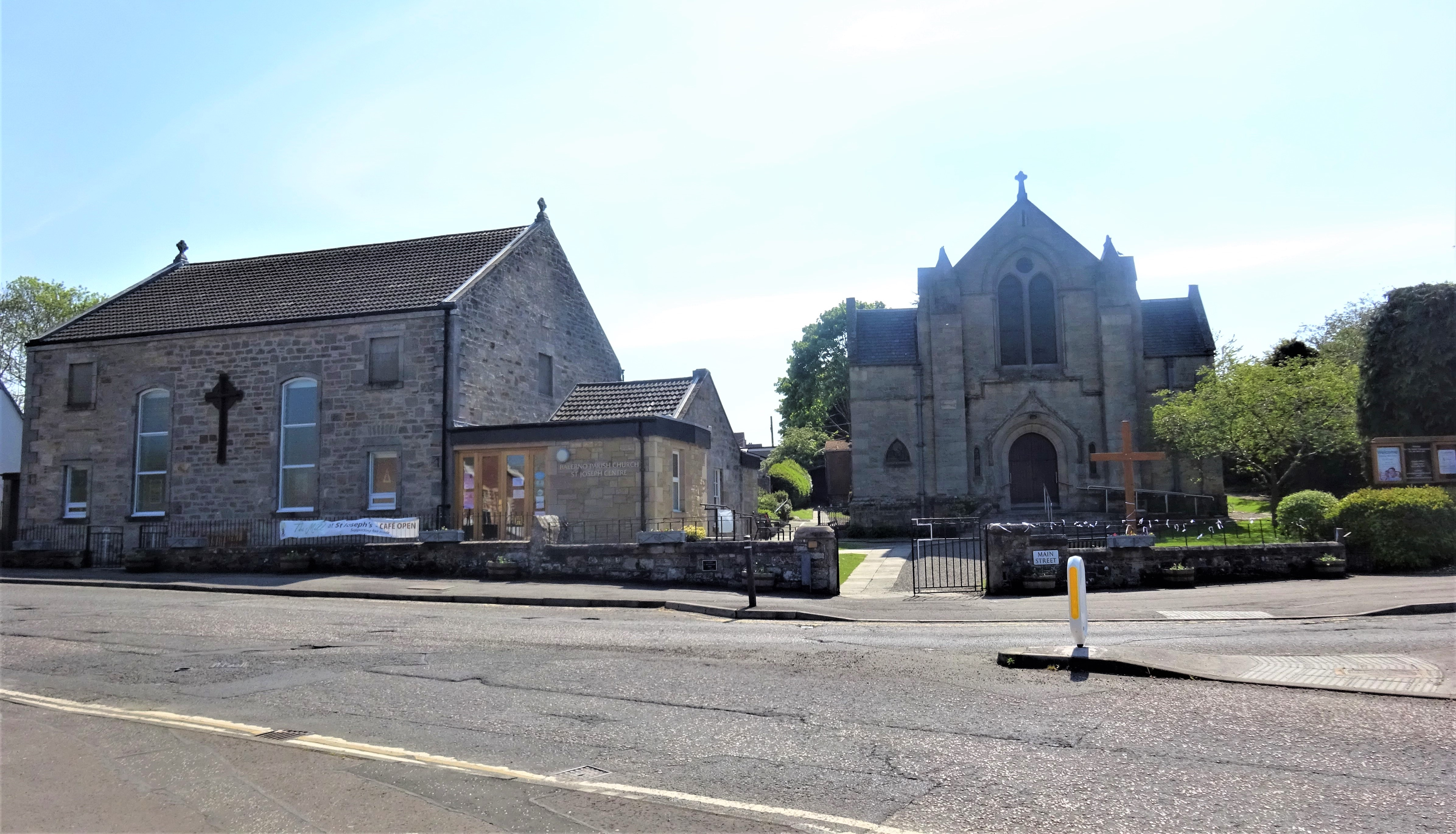
Balerno Parish Church and Hall

Balerno has two churches (the parish church and St Mungo's Church).

Balerno Parish Church is part of the Church of Scotland. The church was designed in a Gothic style by James Graham Fairley and completed in 1888. It is Category C listed, rectangular in shape and composed of sandstone and Ashlar. It was originally designed as a church for a United Presbyterian congregation.

St Mungo's Church is part of the Scottish Episcopal Church. The church was designed by Robert Rowand Anderson and completed in 1869. The church is finished in white harling and is Category B listed.

The nearby former St Joseph's Catholic Church closed in August 2006, with the building purchased by Balerno Parish Church and renamed "The St Joseph's Centre".

== Sport ==
Balerno is home to Currie RFC, who play at Malleny Park. Currie won the Scottish Rugby Union Scottish Premiership Division One in 2007 and 2010.

Balerno Bowling Club situated in the heart of the village dates back to 1885, plays lawn bowls in the Water of Leith league, Edinburgh & Leith Bowling Association.

Balerno Lawn Tennis Club, located in the heart of the village, is open all year and offers two all-weather courts. Membership of the club is required to book courts and play. The club is situated behind the balerno scout hall.

== Media ==
C&B News – originally Currie & Balerno News – is a monthly volunteer-run “local community news magazine” (available in print and as a downloadable PDF) covering Balerno and neighbouring Currie, Juniper Green, Baberton Mains and Colinton. Originally launched in February 1976, and published 10 times a year, the magazine features local news and articles, contributions from local political representatives, and updates on local planning issues—all voluntarily submitted by local residents. The magazine published its 500th issue in October 2024and celebrated its 50th anniversary in February 2026.

A bespoke edition of the “lifestyle and community magazine” Konect is delivered to households in Balerno as well as neighbouring Currie, Juniper Green, Baberton Mains and Ratho.

Since 2021, Balerno Parish Church has published a monthly newsletter, Balerno Blether. This replaced the previously bimonthly publication The Bridge, which ceased during the COVID-19 lockdowns in 2020.

== Notable people ==
- Neil Alexander - Scottish footballer (goalkeeper)
- Craig Gordon - Scottish footballer (goalkeeper)
- Graham Moodie - Scottish field hockey player
- Peter Heatly - Scottish diver and ex-Chairman of the Commonwealth Games Federation
- Nina Nesbitt - Scottish singer-songwriter and guitarist
- Boards of Canada - brothers Marcus and Michael Sandison, musicians
- Christ. (musician) - formerly part of Hexagon Sun Collective with Boards of Canada
- Michael Deacon - political sketch writer for The Daily Telegraph
- Chris Grassick - Scotland and Great Britain field hockey player
- Paul Research and John Mackie (brothers), musicians and founders of the post-punk band The Scars rehearsed and first performed at Balerno Scout Hall
- Sally Shaw, professor of sport management in New Zealand
- Andrew Wilson (economist) - Economist and former MSP
