= Sally Shaw (academic) =

Professor in Sport Management at the University of Otago

Academic background
- Education: De Montfort University, University of York, University of Sheffield
- Thesis: The construction of gender relations in sport organisations (2001)
- Doctoral advisor: Dawn Penney, Trevor Slack

Sally A. Shaw is a British–New Zealand academic, and is a full professor at the University of Otago, specialising in diversity, inclusion and gender issues in sports and sport management.

== Academic career ==
Shaw grew up in Balerno, near Edinburgh, and attended St Leonard's School in St Andrews. She has a Bachelor of Arts with Honours in sociology from the University of York, and a Master of Science from the University of Sheffield. Shaw initially worked in sports management at the English Sports Council, before returning to study at De Montfort University. Shaw completed a PhD titled The construction of gender relations in sport organisations in 2001, supervised by Trevor Slack and Dawn Penney. Shaw then moved to Canada to lecture at Brock University, before joining the faculty of the University of Waikato in New Zealand. She joined the University of Otago in 2005, rising to associate professor in 2018 and full professor in 2024.

Shaw is Research Fellow of the North American Society for Sport Management. She is on the editorial board of the journals Sport Management Review and Journal of Sport Management.

Shaw's research covers diversity, equity and inclusion in sport and sport management and governance. Shaw is gay, and conducted the first New Zealand national study of homophobia in sport, which found that despite there being many gay and lesbian people in sport, many of them were still uncomfortable coming out. She has studied the experience of LGBTQ+ women and non-binary people during the 2023 FIFA Women's World Cup. She comments publicly on gender and sexuality issues in sport.

== Selected works ==
- Shaw, Sally; Larena Hoeber (2003). ""A Strong Man Is Direct and a Direct Woman Is a Bitch": Gendered Discourses and Their Influence on Employment Roles in Sport Organizations". Journal of Sport Management. 17 (4): 347–375. doi:10.1123/jsm.17.4.347. Wikidata Q125185673.
- Shaw, Sally; Wendy Frisby (2006). "Can Gender Equity Be More Equitable?: Promoting an Alternative Frame for Sport Management Research, Education, and Practice". Journal of Sport Management. 20 (4): 483–509. doi:10.1123/jsm.20.4.483. Wikidata Q125185663.
- George B. Cunningham; Sheranne Fairley; Lesley Ferkins; Shannon Kerwin; Daniel Lock; Shaw, Sally; Pamela Wicker (2018). "eSport: Construct specifications and implications for sport management". Sport Management Review. 21 (1): 1–6. doi:10.1016/j.smr.2017.11.002. Wikidata Q125185637.
- Justine B. Allen; Shaw, Sally (2009). ""Everyone rolls up their sleeves and mucks in": Exploring volunteers' motivation and experiences of the motivational climate of a sporting event". Sport Management Review. 12 (2): 79–90. doi:10.1016/j.smr.2008.12.002. Wikidata Q125185650.
- Shaw, Sally (2006). "Scratching the Back of "Mr X": Analyzing Gendered Social Processes in Sport Organizations". Journal of Sport Management. 20 (4): 510–534. doi:10.1123/jsm.20.4.510. Wikidata Q125185669.
- Allen, Justine; Shaw, Sally (2009). "Women Coaches' Perceptions of Their Sport Organizations' Social Environment: Supporting Coaches' Psychological Needs?". Sport Psychologist. 23 (3): 346–366. doi:10.1123/tsp.23.3.346. Wikidata Q125185655.
- Shaw, Sally; T. Slack (2002). "'It's been like that for Donkey's Years': The Construction of Gender Relations and the Cultures of Sports Organizations". Sport in Society. 5 (1): 86–106. doi:10.1080/713999851. Wikidata Q126091929.
