= Dean Village =

Village near Edinburgh, Scotland

Coordinates: 55.952°N 3.218°W

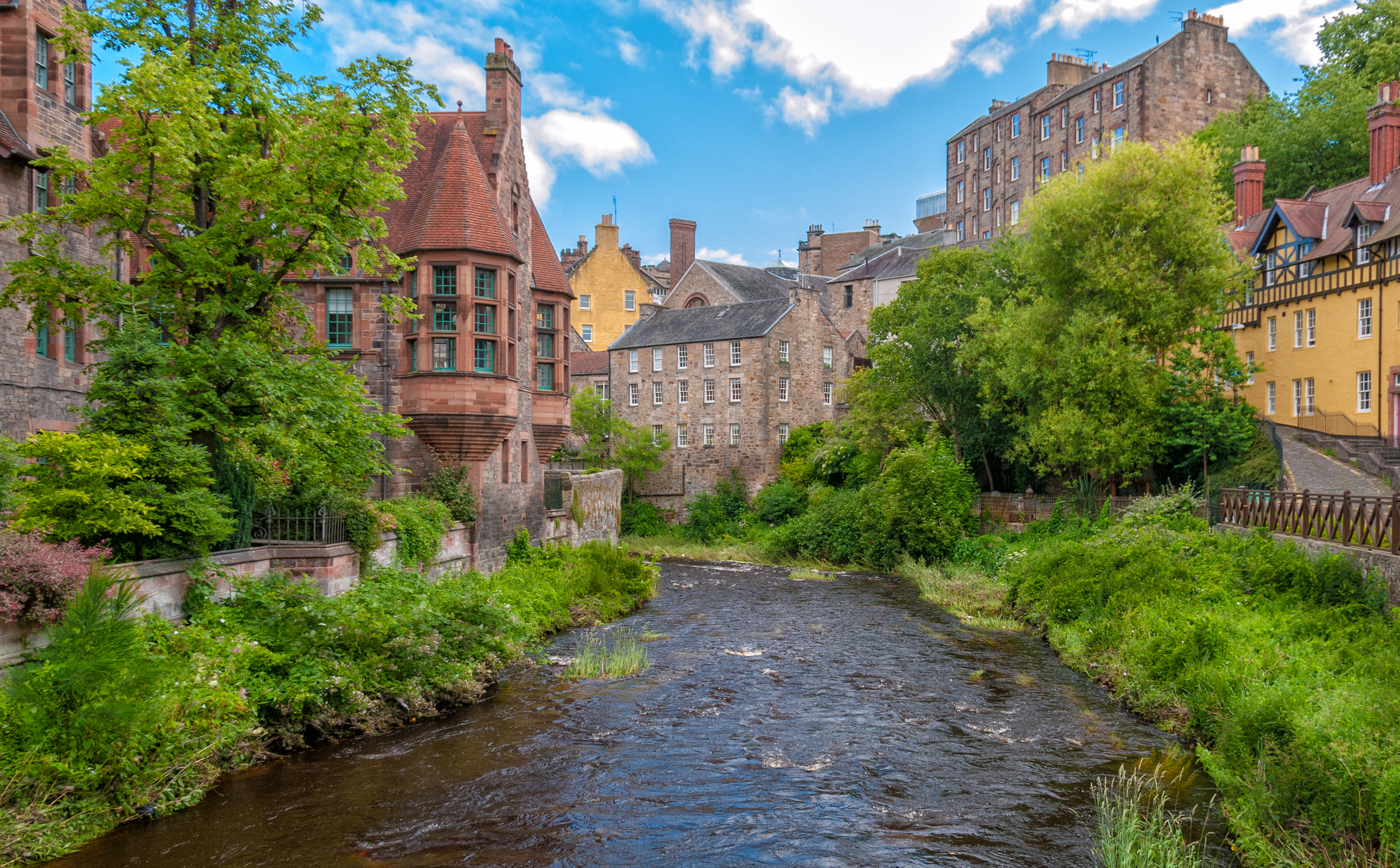
- The Water of Leith flowing through Dean Village

- Location within the City of Edinburgh council area Location within Scotland
- OS grid reference: NT 24103 74085
- Council area: City of Edinburgh
- Country: Scotland
- Sovereign state: United Kingdom
- Post town: Edinburgh
- Postcode district: EH4
- Police: Scotland
- Fire: Scottish
- Ambulance: Scottish
- Scottish Parliament: Edinburgh

Dean Village (from dene, meaning 'deep valley') is a former village immediately northwest of the city centre of Edinburgh, Scotland. It is bounded by Belford Road to the south and west, Belgrave Crescent Gardens to the north and below the Dean Bridge to the east. It was formerly known as the "Water of Leith Village" and was a successful grain milling area for more than 800 years. At one time there were no fewer than eleven working mills there, driven by water from the Water of Leith.

== History ==
=== Development ===
Dean Village is one of the oldest of the villages that lay around the original Royal Burgh of Edinburgh. The village was referred to in 1535 as the miller's village and appears on the 1560 map of the Siege of Leith. In the Town Council Minutes of 1585 Water of Leith is used as the name of the village. The term 'Dean Village' initially referred to a small settlement at the top of Dean Path, north of the river, that formed part of the Dean estate (the area now occupied by the Dean Cemetery).

The first extant mention of the Dene is in King David I's founding charter of Holyrood Abbey, usually dated c.1145 (although the actual founding of the Abbey was in 1128), in which he granted one of his mills of Dene to the Abbey.

Because of its role as a milling village, it became heavily associated with the 'Edinburgh Incorporated Trade of Baxters'. The Incorporation of Baxters (or Bakers) built a large granary here in 1675 part of which served as the village Tolbooth.

In 1592, the Dean estate "w’ the mylnes and mure thereof, and their pertinents, lyand within the Sherifdom of Edinburgh,” were given to James Lindsay, 7th Lord Lindsay of the Byres, by James VI. In 1609, the twice later Provost of Edinburgh, Sir William Nisbet, bought the barony of Dean from John, 8th Lord Lindsay of the Byres. William is said by some to have built a tower house here, however it is possible that he remodelled an existing earlier building. It is believed this is the building that would become known as Dean House. It is known that the Dean House was a tower house dating from around the 16th or early 17th century.

The Water of Leith Bridge at the foot of the steep roadways of Bell's Brae to the south leading to Edinburgh and Path Brae to the north leading to Granton and Queensferry, in the centre of Dean Village, is believed to be on the site of ancient crossings of the river. The current bridge was built in the early 18th century as a single arch bridge wide enough for a carriage with horses. At the time, this was one of the crossing of the Water of Leith on the route from Edinburgh to Queensferry.

=== Decline ===
The area remained a separate village until the 19th century, but due to the development of much larger and more modern flour mills at Leith, Dean Village's trade diminished.

In 1826, John Learmonth, a future Lord Provost of Edinburgh, purchased the Dean Estate from the Nisbets of Dean with the hope of expanding the Western New Town into the north.

A bridge was needed to access from one side of the high valley to the other (the low-lying village was more or less an irrelevance) to expand the New Town northward. The Cramond Road Trustees discarded plans by other engineers and insisted upon the use of Thomas Telford. They also insisted that the bridge be toll-free. This was built 1831-2 and opened in 1833 and allowed traffic to bypass the Dean Village altogether.

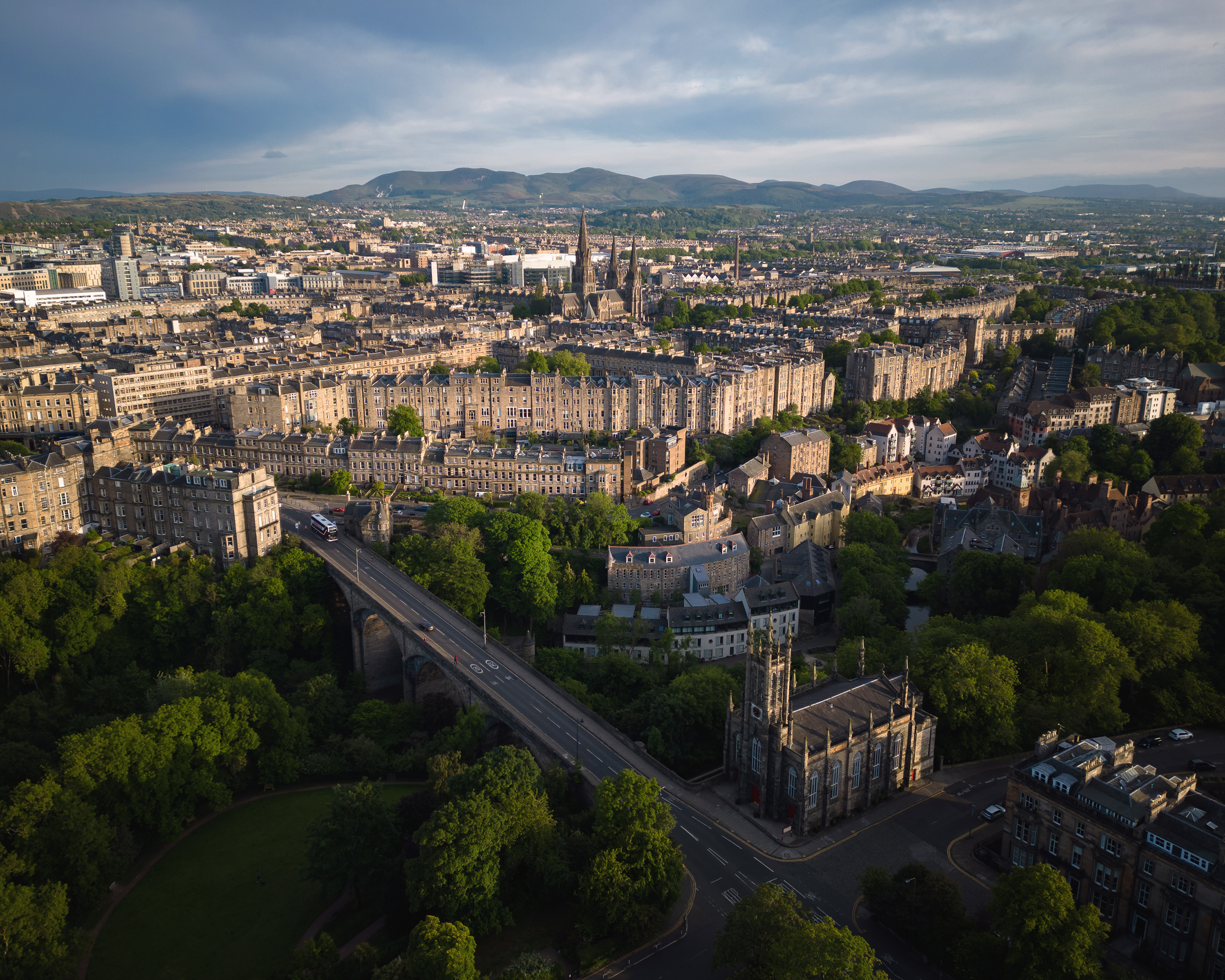
An aerial view of the Dean Bridge and Dean Village towered over by the town houses of the West End

The four-arched Dean Bridge spans a width of over 400 feet and is 106 feet above the water level. It carries the Queensferry Road over the Dean Gorge and over the village, and was built at the joint expense of John Learmonth and the Cramond Road Trustees. The contractors were John Gibb & Son, from Aberdeen. The bridge transformed access westwards from the city and opened up the potential to develop the Dean estate and expand the New Town northward. The side parapet of the bridge was raised in height in 1912 as a deterrent to suicides, which were very common here in the 19th century, being more or less guaranteed success.

In 1847 the Dean Cemetery was created, standing on the site of Dean House. This mansion house, which formed the centre of the Dean Estate, was the one that had been bought by Sir William Nisbet in 1609. It was demolished in 1845 to create the cemetery but some sculptured stones are incorporated in the southern retaining wall (visible only from lower level). Seven surviving panels of the painted ceiling (painted between 1605 and 1627) of the great hall of Dean House are now in the National Museum of Scotland. The cemetery, which is one of the few in Scotland run as a non-profit making charity trust (to avoid being asset-stripped), is the resting place of many well-known people, including the railway engineer Sir Thomas Bouch and David Octavius Hill.

In 1887 a new bridge called Belford Bridge on the Old Queensferry Road (now Belford Road) was built at the site of an older crossing upriver from the village, next to Bell's Mills. Between the Belford Bridge and the Dean Bridge, travellers could now effectively bypass the majority of the Dean Village entirely, and the Water of Leith Bridge became much less important as a crossing.

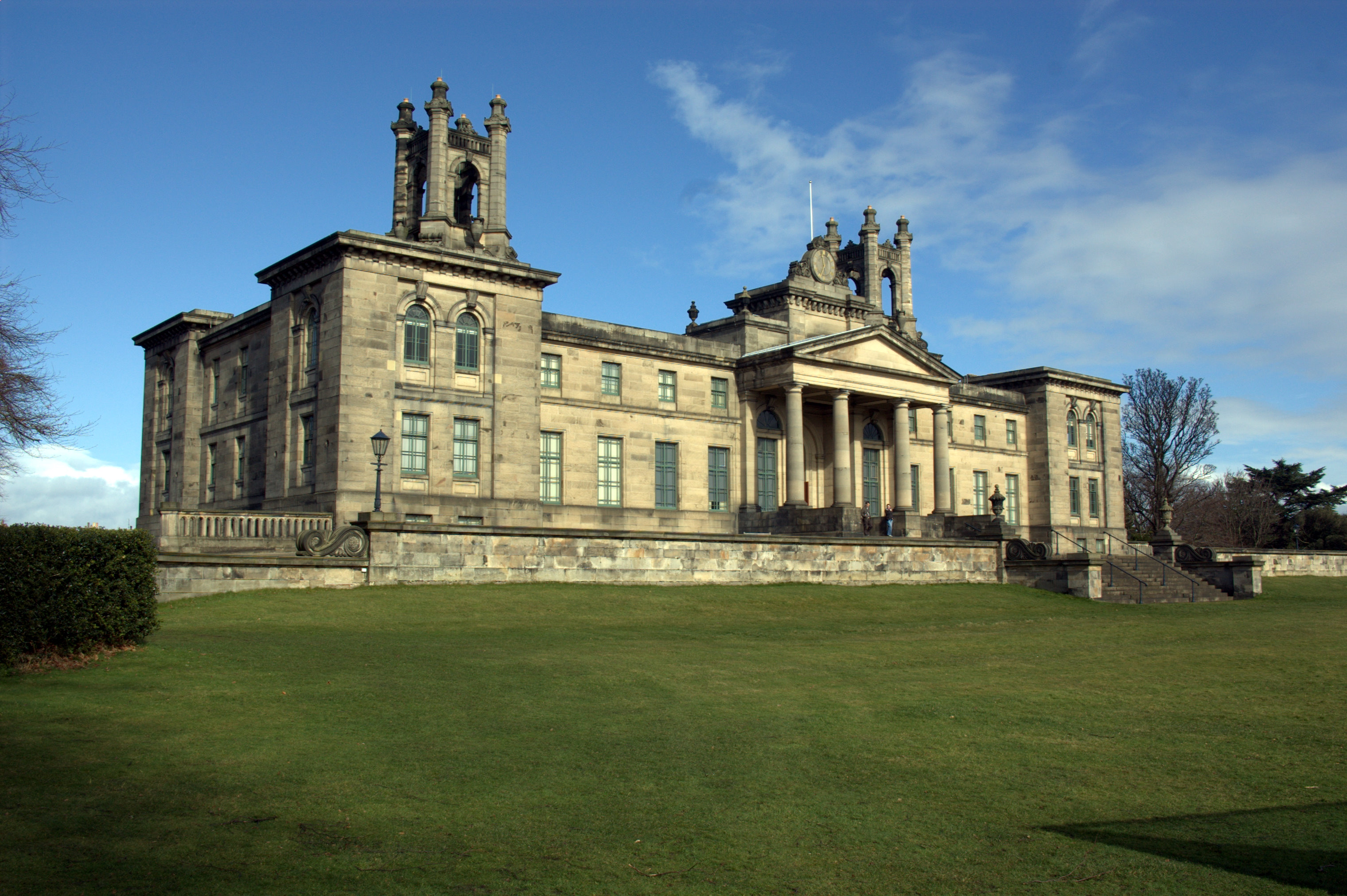
The Dean Orphanage, now the Dean Gallery in the West End of Edinburgh, overlooks the Belford part of the Dean Village

As the West End and Wester Coates developments expanded north, their buildings began to engulf and surround the old Dean Village. Rows of Victorian crescents were built up to, and around the water of Leith. Two large Georgian properties were built north of the river as part the West End expansion, to the west and north west of the old Bells Mill site. These were the John Watson's School in 1825 and the Dean Orphanage in 1834.

The bakers' Tolbooth would be altered in 1900 by Robert Lorimer to become the Cathedral Mission for St. Mary's Episcopal Cathedral.

For many years, the village became associated with decay and poverty, and it reached a low point by around 1960.

=== Redevelopment ===
From the mid-1970s onwards it became recognised as a tranquil oasis, very close to the city centre, and redevelopment and restoration began, converting workers' cottages, warehouses and mill buildings. This included development on a cleared former industrial site on the north side of the river.

The area has now become a desirable residential area.

The Water of Leith Walkway running from Balerno to Leith was created through the area in 1983.

Dean Bridge which passes over the village connecting the north and south parts of the West End was featured in Ian Rankin's fictional book Strip Jack, in which a woman is found dead in the river underneath the bridge. It also features as a location in the second book of the Peter May Lewis trilogy, The Lewis Man, in which a 1950s schoolboy dare results in a fatality.

== Gallery ==
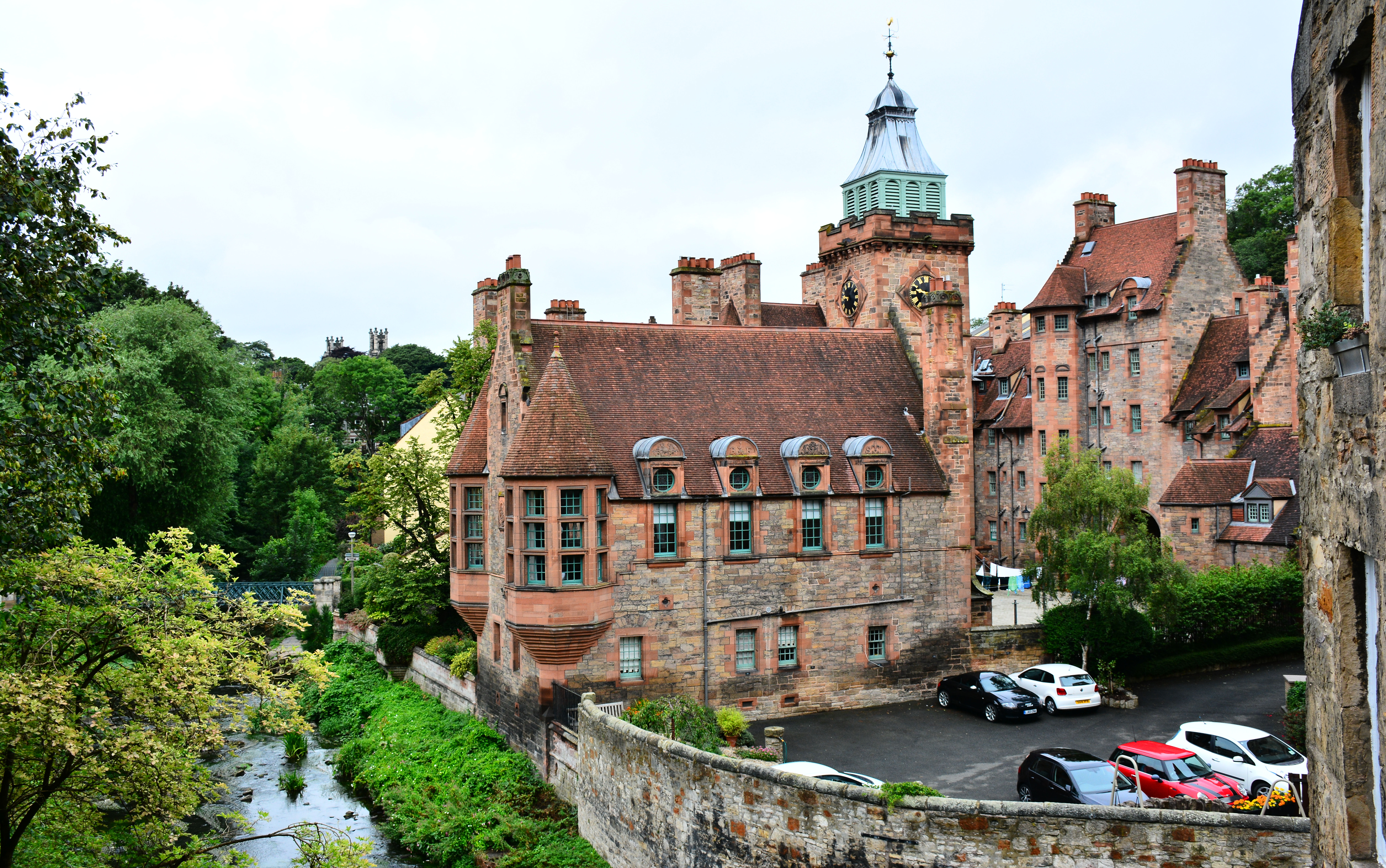

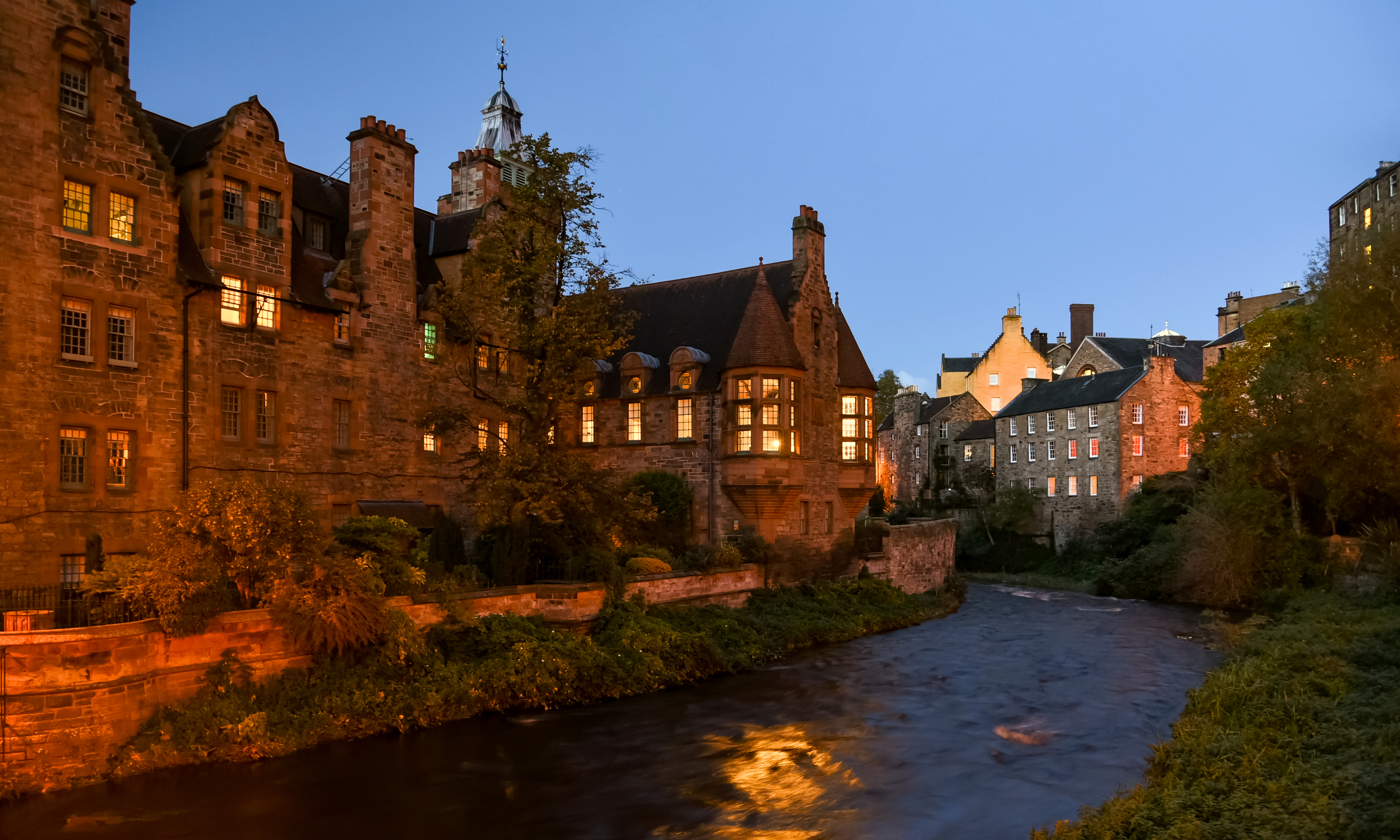

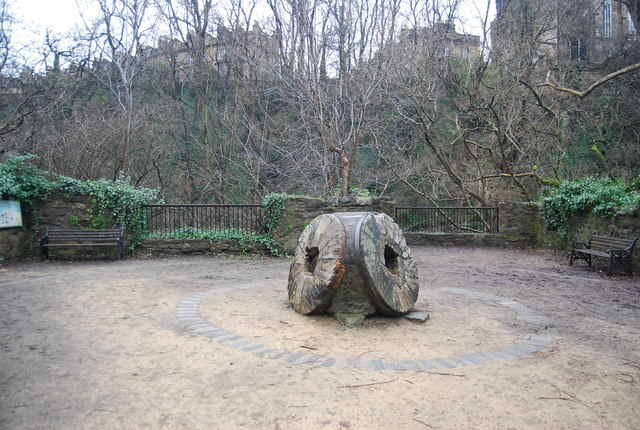

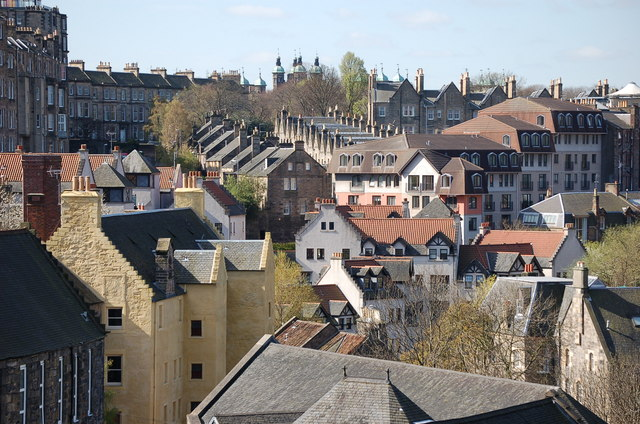

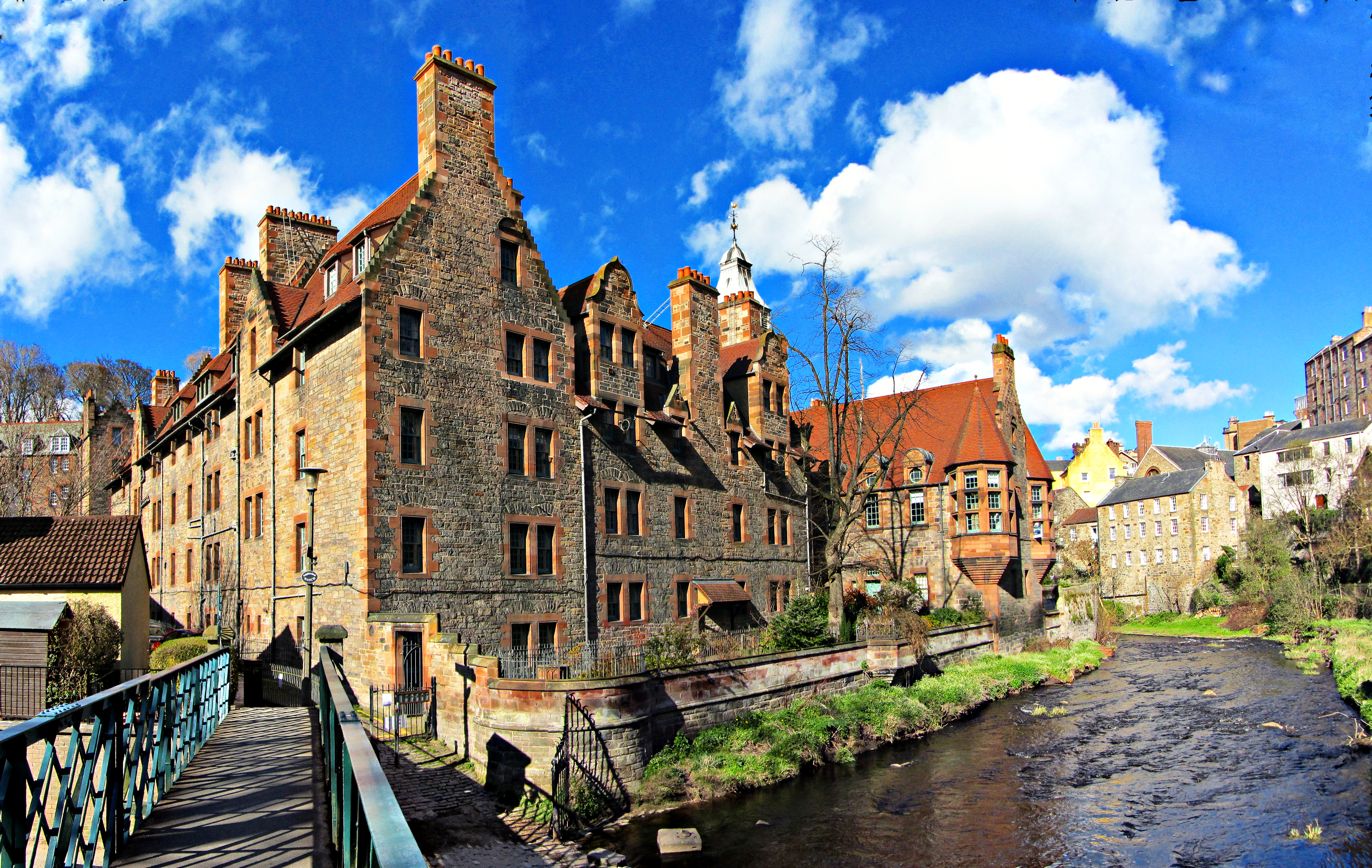

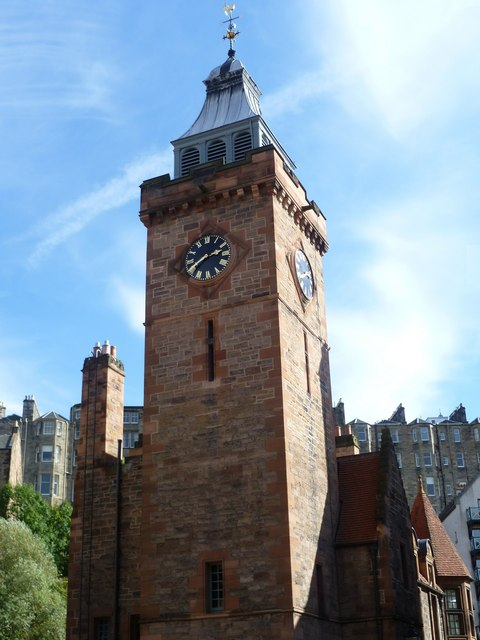

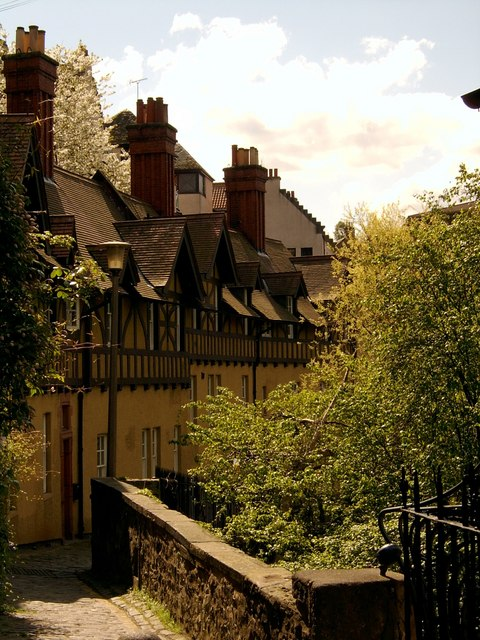

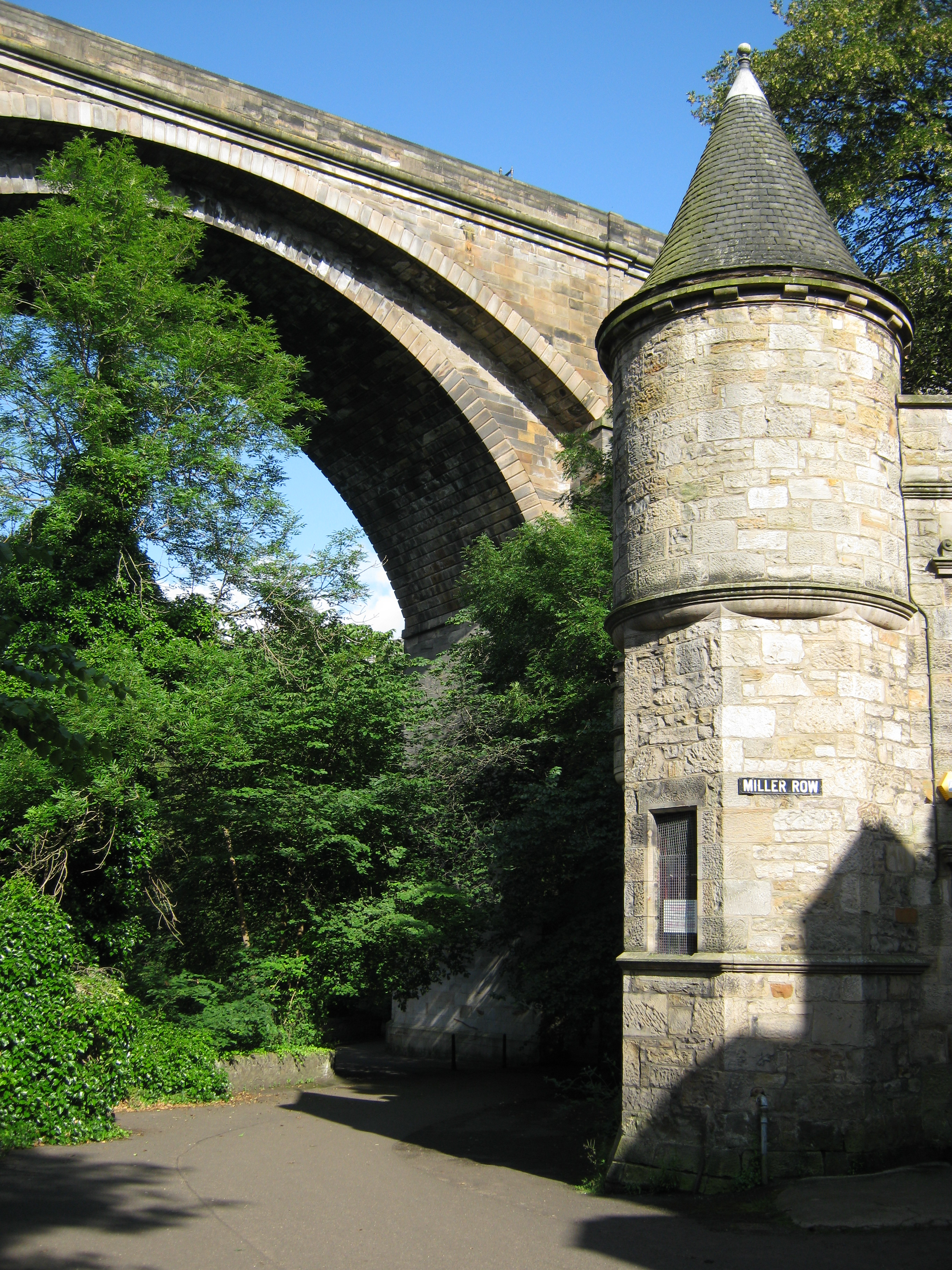
