= Balerno line =

Former railway line in Scotland

Coordinates: 55.88958°N 3.33769°W

The Balerno Line

Overview
- Locale: Scotland

History
- Opened: 1874
- Closed: 1968

Technical
- Track gauge: 1,435 mm (4 ft 8 1/2 in) standard gauge

The Balerno line was a short loop railway in the southern suburbs of Edinburgh, Scotland. It was 6 miles in length, leaving the main Caledonian Railway Edinburgh to Carstairs line at Slateford, and rejoining it at Ravelrig. It was built by the Caledonian Railway mainly to service the many manufacturing enterprises situated along the upper Water of Leith, and passenger trains also ran. The line opened in 1874. As well as at Balerno, stations were constructed at Colinton, Juniper Green and Currie. The line was steeply graded.

In the 1930s the line increased in popularity for residential and leisure travel, but the passenger business never reached the desired level, and the line was closed to passenger trains in 1943. In the 1960s the mills that sustained the goods train business closed down, and the line closed completely in 1967.

== History ==
=== Beginnings ===
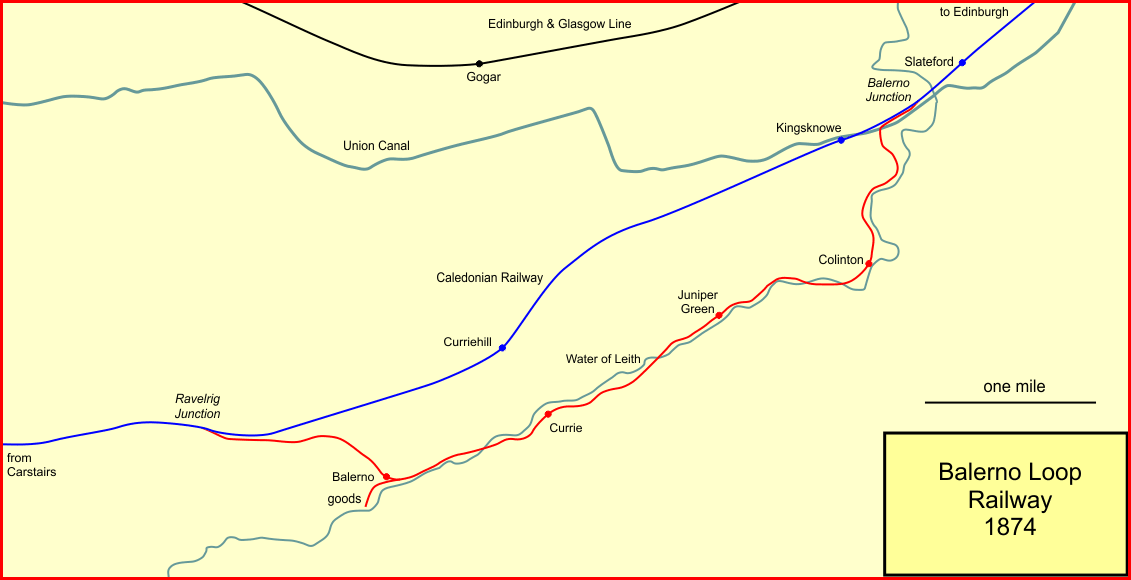
Map of the Balerno loop line railway

Already at the beginning of the eighteenth century there were several mills and other sites of local industry along the Water of Leith. Balerno was "very much a small village". Transport for finished products was by road and the road network was poor. The opening of the Union Canal in 1822 ameliorated the problem somewhat, even though it passed three miles (5 km) away to the north. This was of great importance to the district. The transport facilities were enhanced further by the opening of the Caledonian Railway through the area in 1848. The Edinburgh line of the Caledonian Railway from Carstairs ran south-west to north-east through open countryside when it was built. It was designed as a through line, and it avoided the narrow valley of the Water of Leith.

There were twenty-two mills on the Water of Leith between Slateford and Balerno; these included the manufacture of snuff, grain meal, spices, woodflour for linoleum, and specialist paper for bank notes, as well as several ordinary paper mills. With the removal of excise duty from esparto in 1861, the substitution of the grass fibre for rags stimulated the manufacture of paper.

Caledonian Railway (Balerno Branch) Act 1865
- Act of Parliament
- Parliament of the United Kingdom
- Long title: An Act for enabling the Caledonian Railway Company to make a Branch Railway to Balerno in the County of Edinburgh; and for other Purposes.
- Citation: 28 & 29 Vict. c. clxi

Dates
- Royal assent: 29 June 1865

Text of statute as originally enacted

As the railway network developed, local mill-owners began to agitate for better railway connection to their premises, and on 16 September 1864 the Caledonian Railway decided to accede to their request and construct a branch line from Slateford to Balerno. The construction of the line would cost £80,000, but it was expected that there would be very heavy additional costs for land acquisition. Royal assent was given to the Caledonian Railway (Balerno Branch) Act 1865 (28 & 29 Vict. c. clxi) authorising the construction on 29 June 1865. The terminus at Balerno would be near Balerno bridge. Authorised share capital was £150,000. Parliament imposed a penalty of £50 a day if the construction was not completed in five years.

The Branch Railway by this Act authorized to be constructed is,-

A Railway (to be called the "Balerno Branch ") commencing by a Junction with the Main Line of the Caledonian Railway from Carlisle to Edinburgh near the Booking Office of the Slateford Station of that Railway, and terminating near Balerno Bridge in the Parish of Currie by which the Road leading from Currie by Newmills to Balerno is carried over the Water of Leith. — Section 15, Caledonian Railway (Balerno Branch) Act 1865 (28 & 29 Vict. c. clxi)

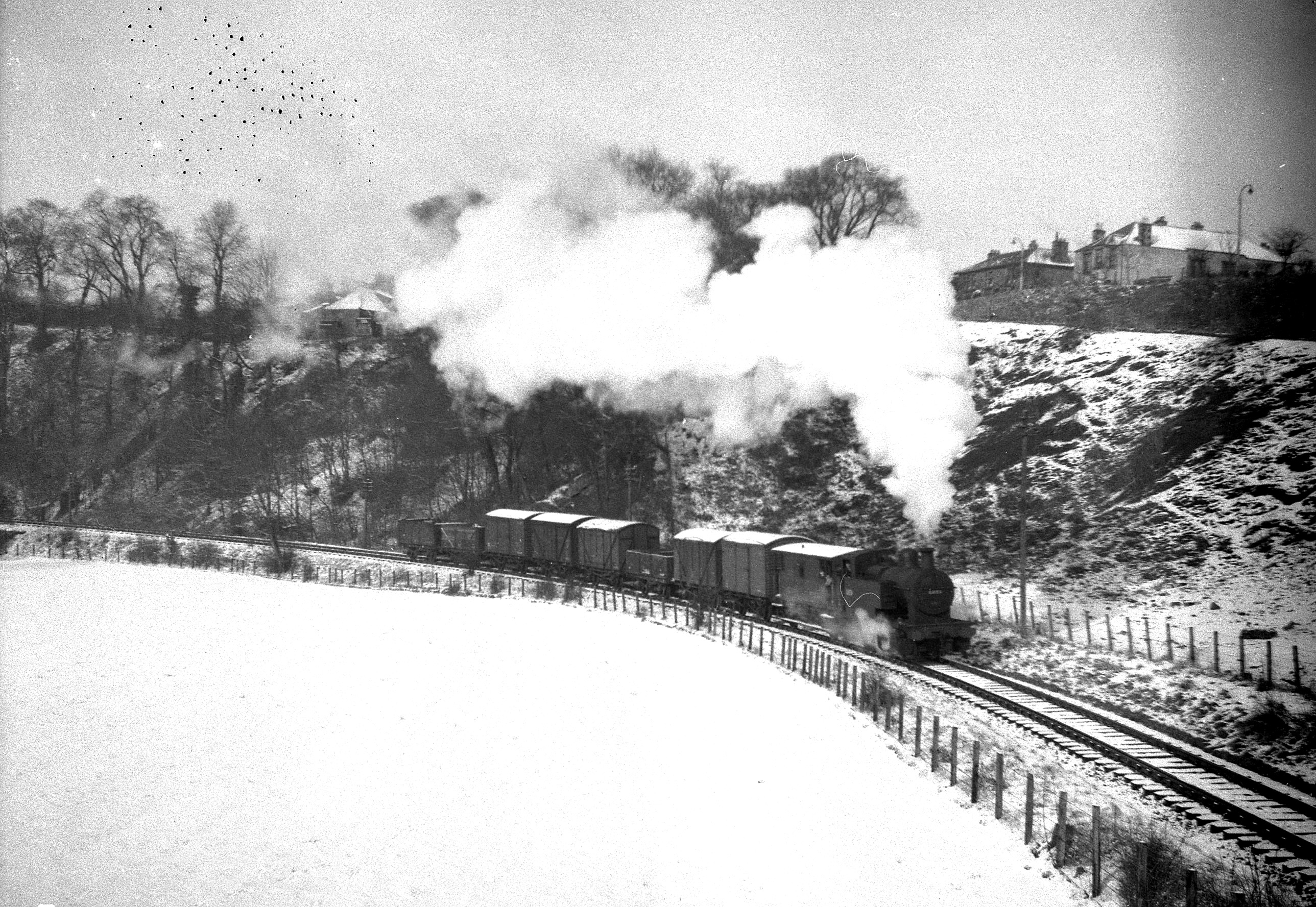
A freight train approaching Juniper Green from Colinton

The Caledonian Railway was heavily committed to capital expenditure on a number of schemes, and the collapse of the banking house of Overend, Gurney and Company in June 1866 resulted in a financial crash, and money for railway construction was impossible to get. The subscriptions the Caledonian had acquired for the Balerno line were expended on other schemes that were already in progress. The company could see that it was not feasible to build the line at the time, and on 22 October 1867 the board decided to abandon the work. The Caledonian Railway (Abandonment, &c.) Act 1869 (32 & 33 Vict. c. cxxvi), authorising the abandonment, was granted on 26 July 1869.

== A second, and successful, attempt ==
The following year the Board considered that the money markets had calmed, and they applied to renew the authorisation of the branch. This time they wished to extend it to Ravelrig, rejoining the Carstairs main line there and forming a loop. This was authorised on 20 June 1870, under the Caledonian Railway (Additional Powers) Act 1870 (33 & 34 Vict. c. xliv). Once again the £50 daily penalty was applied, if the line was not opened by 20 December 1872. In fact construction difficulties in the narrow confines of the valley delayed matters. Col. Rich inspected the line for the Board of Trade; he found some minor issues connected with the signalling arrangements, but he did not object to the opening of the line. Accordingly, it opened to traffic on 1 August 1874. Notwithstanding the overrun, the penalty was not applied. The contractor was Charles Brand of Melrose.

The line was single, with a passing loop at Currie. The earlier Currie station on the main line was renamed Curriehill. At Balerno there was a moderately large goods yard on a southward spur of the branch line; this had earlier been intended as the passenger and goods terminus of the original dead-end branch line. The line had cost £134,000 to construct, of which land acquisition cost £26,800. The gradients were steep, and the Caledonian ordered a special design of 0-4-4T locomotive to handle trains on the line. Four locomotives of the type were ordered; one in particular generally handled the traffic on the line over several decades, number 419. That locomotive has been preserved at the Scottish Railway Preservation Society site at Bo'ness.

== The line in operation ==
=== Timetables ===
The passenger timetable gave six or seven trains over the line between Edinburgh Princes Street and Midcalder. One train, at 15:05 from Midcalder, was a main line train that ran through the Balerno line rather than on the main line.

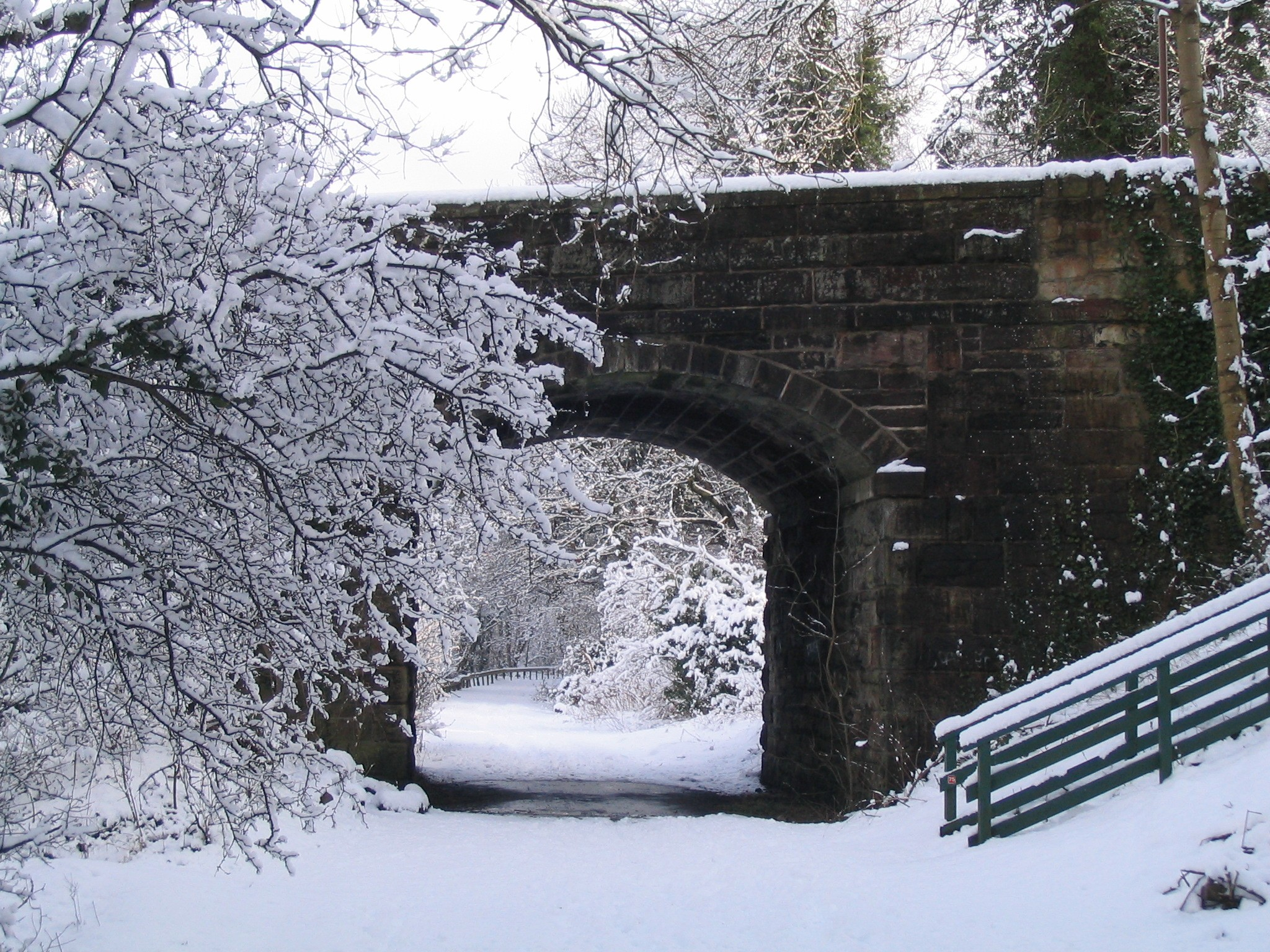
The Balerno line is now a walkway pictured here after a fall of snow

The train service on the line consisted of five each way in July 1876, except Sundays, and twelve in July 1896. In July 1916 there were sixteen, with five on Sundays; and in July 1936 there were twenty, with nine on summer Sundays. In the inter-war period, the popularity of countryside visits for leisure purposes increased considerably, and the natural beauty of the places beside the line, notwithstanding the significant industrial presence, led to satisfactory loadings at weekends. Barrie, writing in 1935, said, "the district [was] much in favour with the citizens of Edinburgh as a pleasantly situated 'dormitory', while its proximity to the Water of Leith makes it a favourite summer resort with picnickers and ramblers." However, in 1937 the Sunday service was withdrawn, diminishing the weekend leisure business.

== Rolling stock ==
Barrie described the operating stock in 1935:

[The trains] are usually formed of four wheeled stock, which is of a special type designed expressly for working on this sharply curved branch. These vehicles are electrically lit, and are among the most modern and comfortable four wheeled coaching stock in the country. Six coaches... normally form a train set, which is strengthened to eight vehicles at the morning and evening peak periods... Motive power is supplied almost exclusively by the special series of 0–4–4 tank engines with small wheels, known as the "Balerno tanks" or "Threepenny Bits". (Note: The reference is to the small wheel size, being compared to silver threepenny pieces of the period.) This series bears the LMS (Note: London, Midland and Scottish Railway.) running numbers 15148 to 15158 inclusive. Goods traffic on the branch is now worked partly by these engines and partly by 0–6–0 tanks. Formerly it was dealt with by the Caledonian 0–4–2 tender engines, Nos 17013 and 17020 spending their declining days in this manner.

== Hailes Halt ==
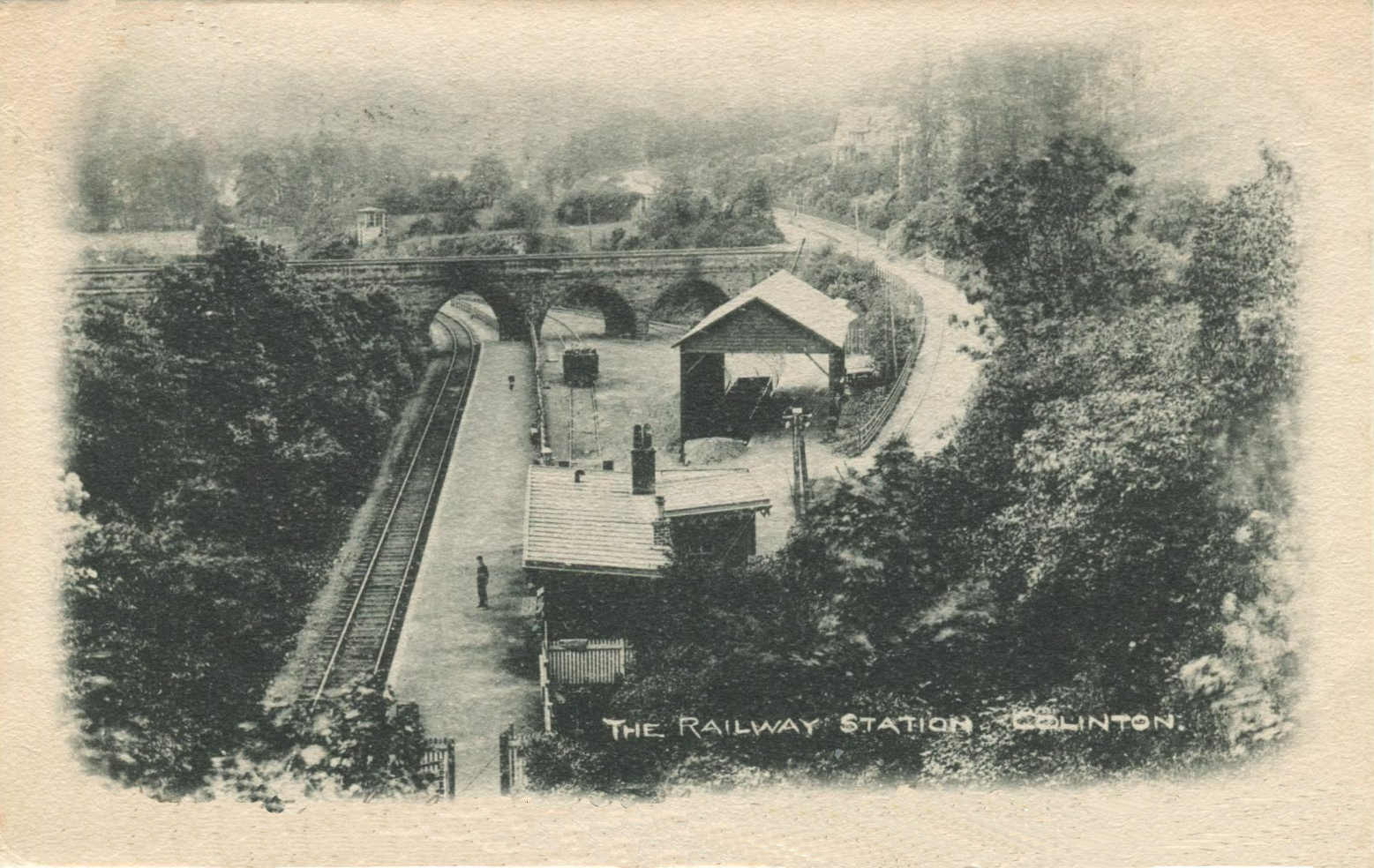
View of Colinton railway station

In 1908 Hailes Halt was opened, mainly for use by those visiting the adjacent golf course. It was made available to the general public from 1927.

== Electric shunting locomotive ==
Between Juniper Green and Currie there was a mill which had its own electric locomotive for shunting purposes.

== Decline ==
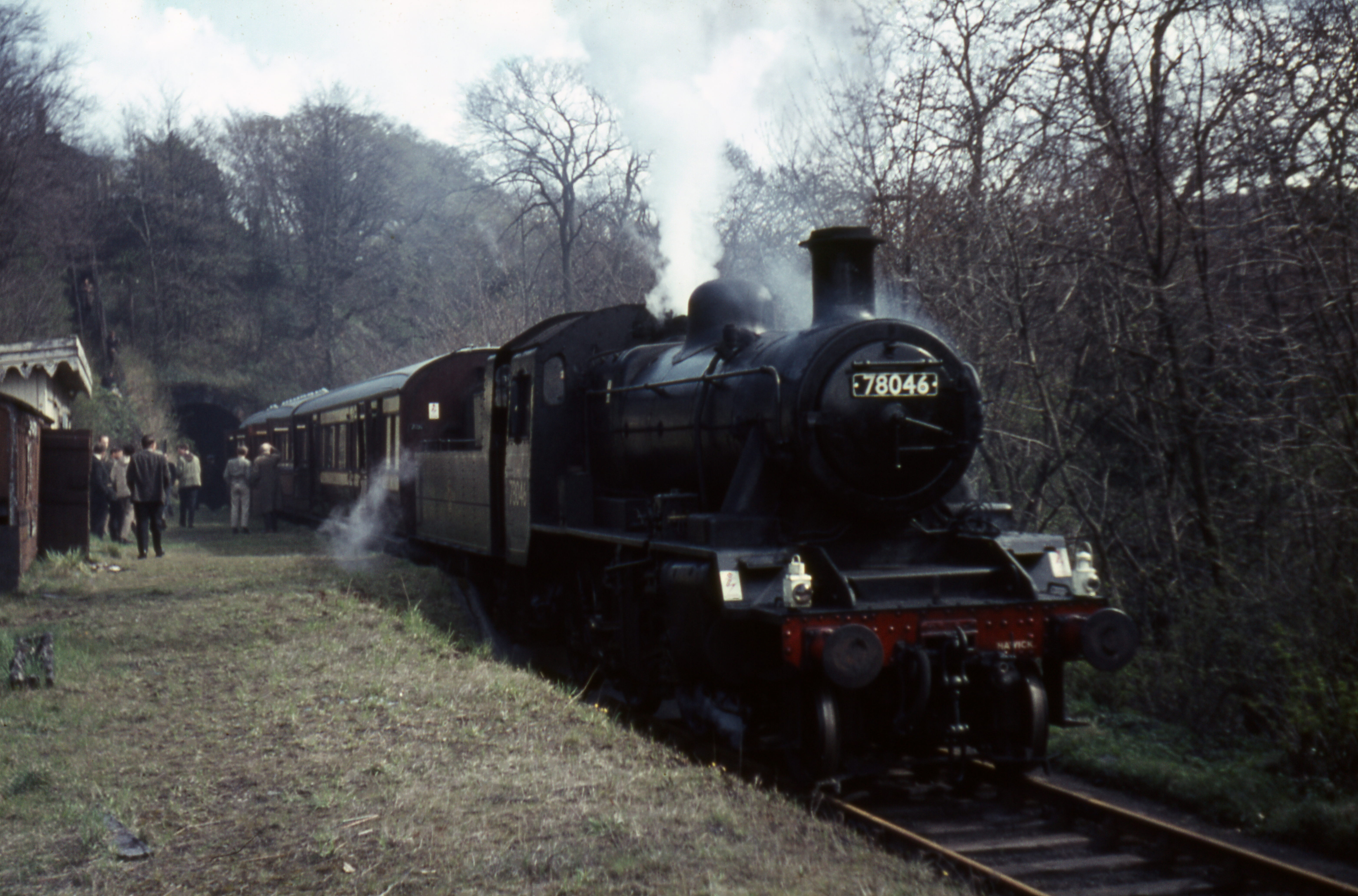
An enthusiasts' special train on the line after closure to ordinary passenger trains

The passenger business on the line declined after the 1930s, and it was closed to passengers after the last train on 30 October 1943. Goods traffic continued for the time being, but after 1963 the Balerno to Ravelrig section closed completely. In 1967 the Kinleith mill operation closed down; this had been the mainstay of the residual goods traffic operation on the line, and in consequence the line closed completely on 4 December 1967.

== Topography ==
=== Gradients ===
The line climbed at 1 in 71 from Ravelrig to Balerno; it then fell consistently to Slateford, at gradients varying from 1 in 49 to 1 in 90.

=== Stations ===
- Balerno Junction;
- Hailes Halt; opened 16 November 1908, mainly for golfers though available to all; first advertised 26 September 1927; closed 1 November 1943;
- Colinton Tunnel; 150 yards;
- Colinton; opened 1 August 1874; closed 1 November 1943;
- Juniper Green; opened 1 August 1874; closed 1 November 1943;
- Currie; opened 1 August 1874; closed 1 November 1943; there had been a Currie station on the main line, renamed Curriehill now;
- Balerno Goods Junction;
- Balerno; opened 1 August 1874; closed 1 November 1943;
- Ravelrig Junction.
