= Juniper Green railway station =

Former railway station in Scotland

Coordinates: 55.9031°N 3.2835°W

Juniper Green
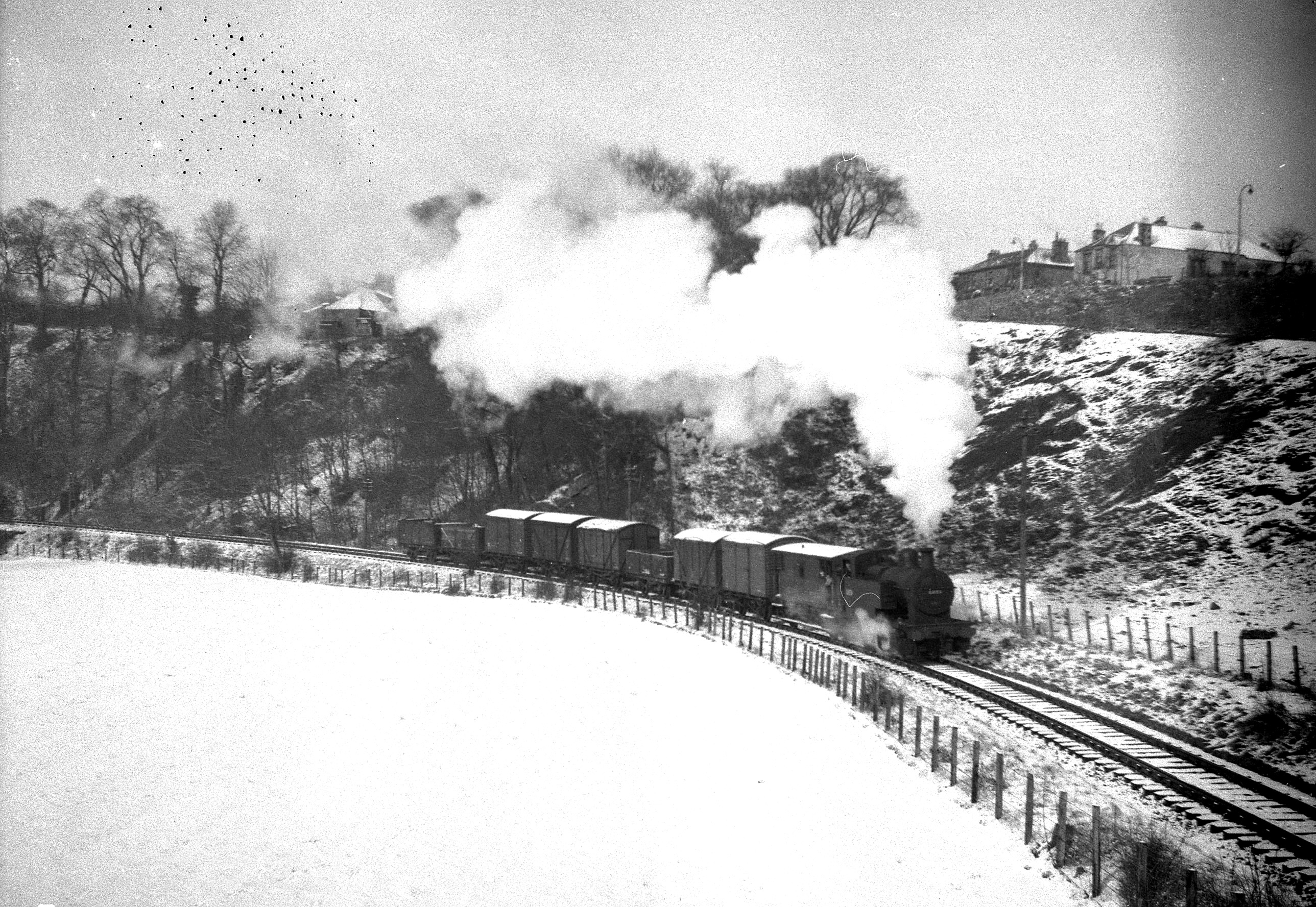
- A freight train approaching the station in 1954

General information
- Location: Edinburgh; Scotland
- Grid reference: NT198685
- Platforms: 1

Other information
- Status: Disused

History
- Pre-grouping: Caledonian Railway
- Post-grouping: London Midland and Scottish Railway

Key dates
- 1 August 1874: Station opens
- 1 November 1943 (Last train): Station closes (LMS Last train)
- 1 June 1949: Station closes (BR Officially)
- 4 December 1967: Line closes to goods traffic
Location

Juniper Green railway station was opened in 1874 and served the area of the then village of Juniper Green that now forms part of the city of Edinburgh. Although primarily built as a goods line to serve the many mills on the Water of Leith, a passenger service was provided by the Caledonian Railway using the Balerno Loop and after grouping by the London, Midland and Scottish Railway, seeing formal closure to passenger traffic shortly after nationalisation. The station lay in rural surroundings despite being only a short distance from the centre of Edinburgh and had been popular with families having a day out in the country.

== History ==
Opened by the Caledonian Railway, it became part of the London Midland and Scottish Railway during the Grouping of 1923, and the LMS ran the last train to serve the station in 1943 with the expectation that the line would re-open after the war. The line passed to the Scottish Region of British Railways upon nationalisation in 1948 who then officially closed Juniper Green in 1949. The line had many tight curves and the low line speeds made it vulnerable to competition from road transport.

== Services ==
The railway was well used by golfers heading to Baberton and Torphin Golf Clubs. At first eight trains ran per day. Juniper Green station saw 38,280 passengers in 1883, accounting for 37% of the lines passenger traffic with a revenue of £872 and £1,285 for goods traffic receipts.

A new siding was provided in 1956 for Woodhall paper mill at the station, however in 1958, reports recommended that the station should be closed as revenue was in the region of £1,750 per annum and there was only one goods train per day.

== Infrastructure ==
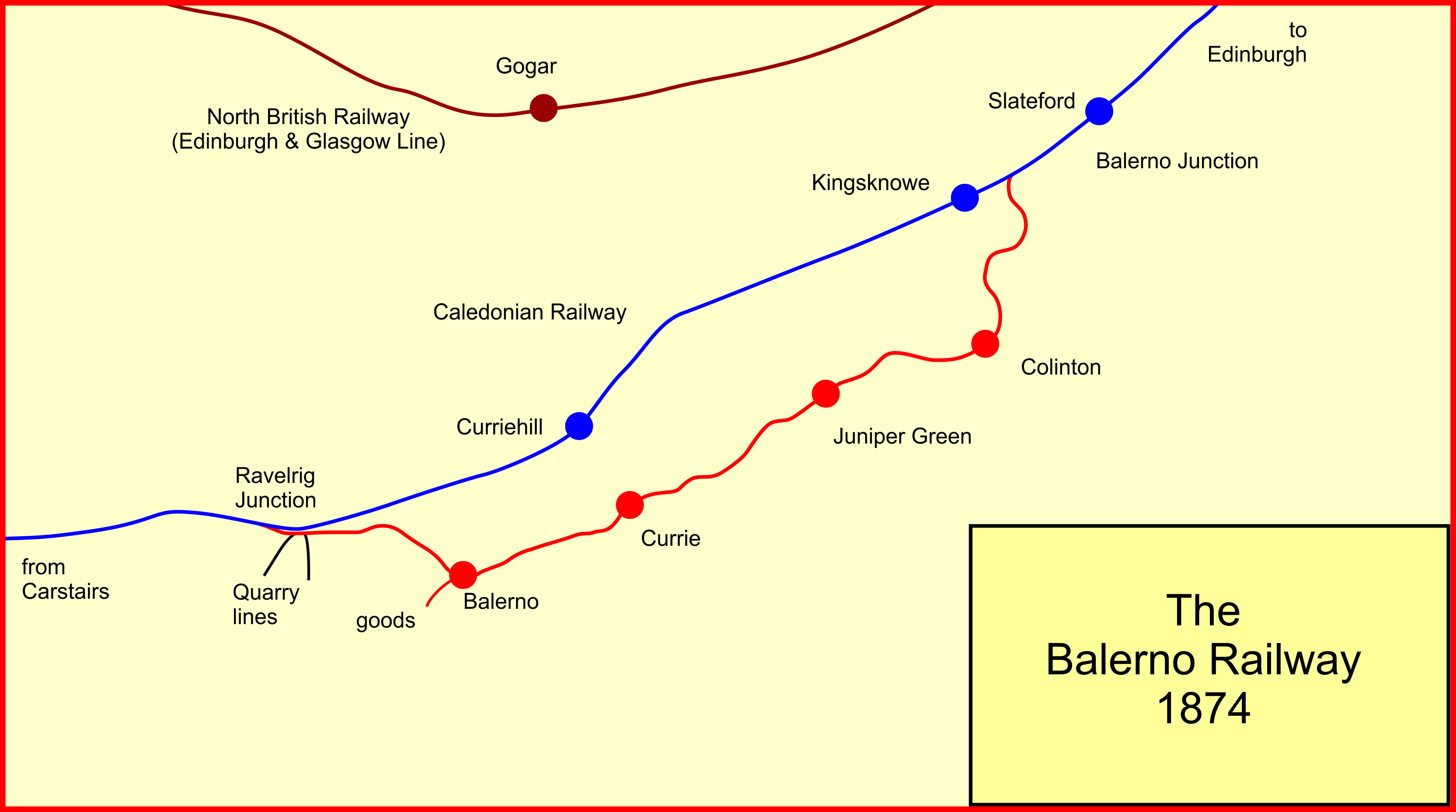
The Balerno railway of the Caledonian Railway

The station had a single partly curved platform and the ticket office, waiting room, etc. were located on the northern side of the single track line with a typical Caledonian Railway style small wooden station building with a short canopy. The goods yard, also on the north side of the line, was served from the east side of the station and had a large goods shed. A pedestrian crossing was present.

The station in 1901 at a cost of £300, was equipped with tablet instruments working the signal and points, that were placed in the station's booking office. This arrangement allowed branch passenger trains to pass goods trains that were held in the station sidings. The signal box became redundant and the tablet equipment continued in operation until 1939.

The OS map of 1893 shows the goods shed with one other siding, a weighing machine and several small buildings associated with the goods yards. A footbridge ran across the Water of Leith to Woodhall House and farm. By 1905 a crane and an additional siding was present. In 1931 a signalbox is shown at the main station buildings.

Preceding station	Historical railways	Following station
Colinton	Caledonian Railway; Balerno Loop	Currie

== The site today ==
The station is now part of the Water of Leith multi user path that follows much of the route of the Balerno Loop and nothing remains of the station.
