= Hailes Halt railway station =

Former railway station in Scotland

Hailes Halt
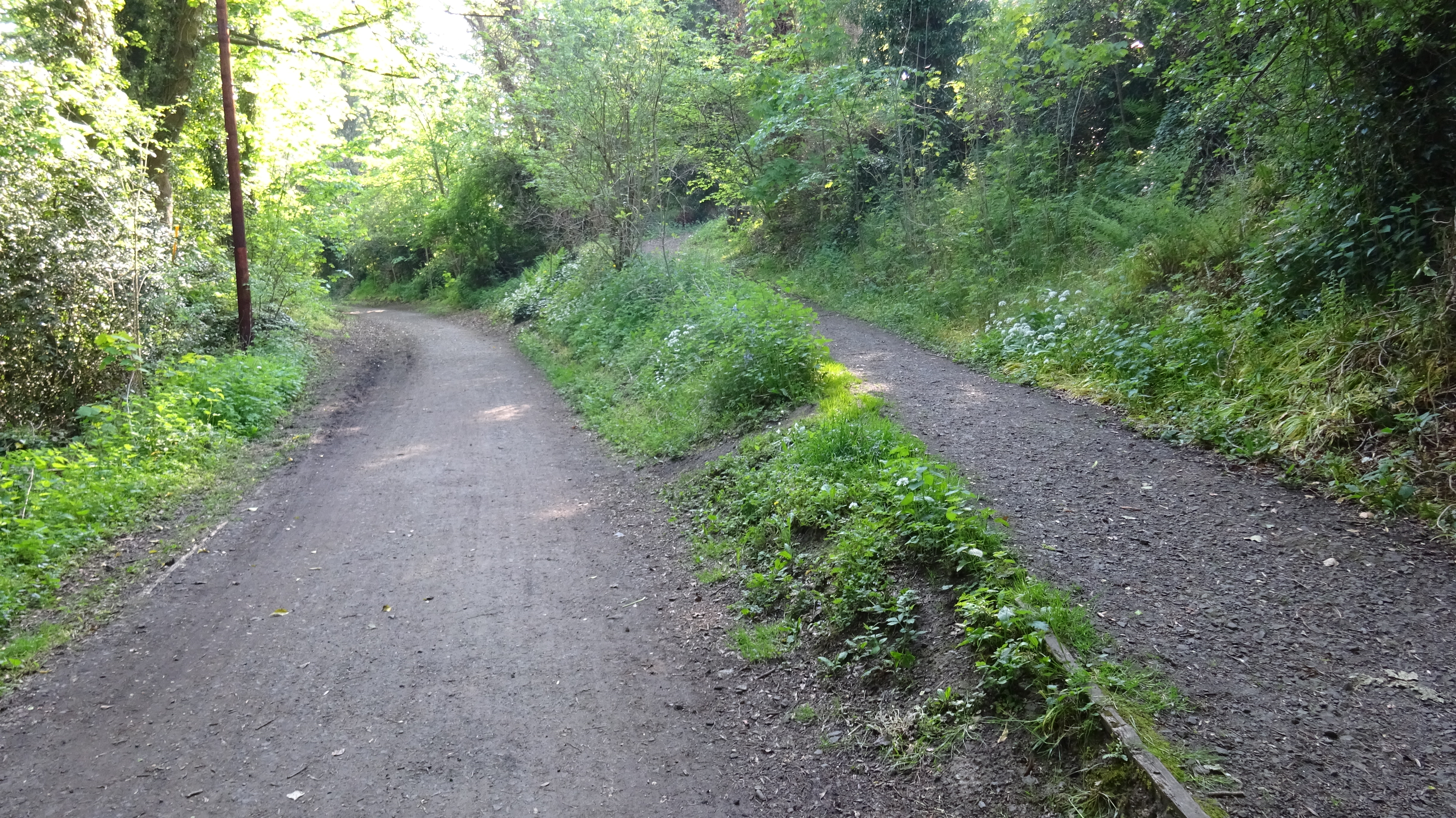
- Trackbed and platform remains at the site of Hailes Halt

General information
- Location: Edinburgh; Scotland
- Coordinates: 55.9130°N 3.2620°W
- Grid reference: NT212696
- Platforms: 1

Other information
- Status: Disused

History
- Pre-grouping: Caledonian Railway
- Post-grouping: London Midland and Scottish Railway

Key dates
- 16 November 1908: Station opens as Hailes Platform
- 26 September 1927: Renamed Hailes Halt and became public station
- 1 November 1943 (Last train): Station closes (LMS Last train)
- 1 June 1949: Station closes (BR Officially)
- 1967: Line closed to freight
Location

Hailes Halt railway station was opened in 1908 as Hailes Platform railway station and was unadvertised private use for golfers. It became a public station in 1927 serving the area of Hailes that now forms part of the city of Edinburgh with Hailes House nearby.

== History ==
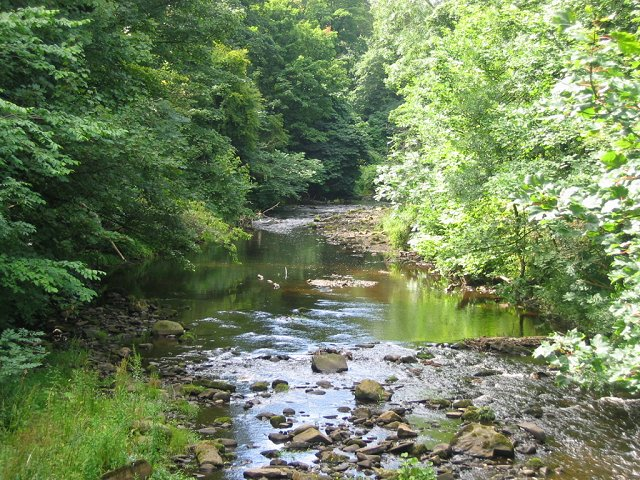
The Water of Leith.

Opened by the Caledonian Railway, it became part of the London Midland and Scottish Railway during the Grouping of 1923, and the LMS ran the last train to serve the station in 1943. The line passed to the Scottish Region of British Railways upon nationalisation in 1948 who then officially closed Hailes Halt in 1949. Until 1927 the station had a private or restricted use status. It stood close to the clubhouse of the Kingsknowe Golf Club with a public path running down to the halt that remains to this day.

== Infrastructure ==
The station had a single platform and was located on the northern side of the single track line. The Water of Leith lies to the south of the site of the old station. After the line closed to freight in 1967 the track was lifted in 1968.

Preceding station	Historical railways	Following station
Slateford	Caledonian Railway; Balerno Loop	Colinton

== The site today ==
The halt would have had little substantial infrastructure and is now part of a cyclepath that follows much of the route of the Balerno Loop.
