= Colinton railway station =

Former railway station in Scotland

Coordinates: 55.9083°N 3.2594°W

Colinton
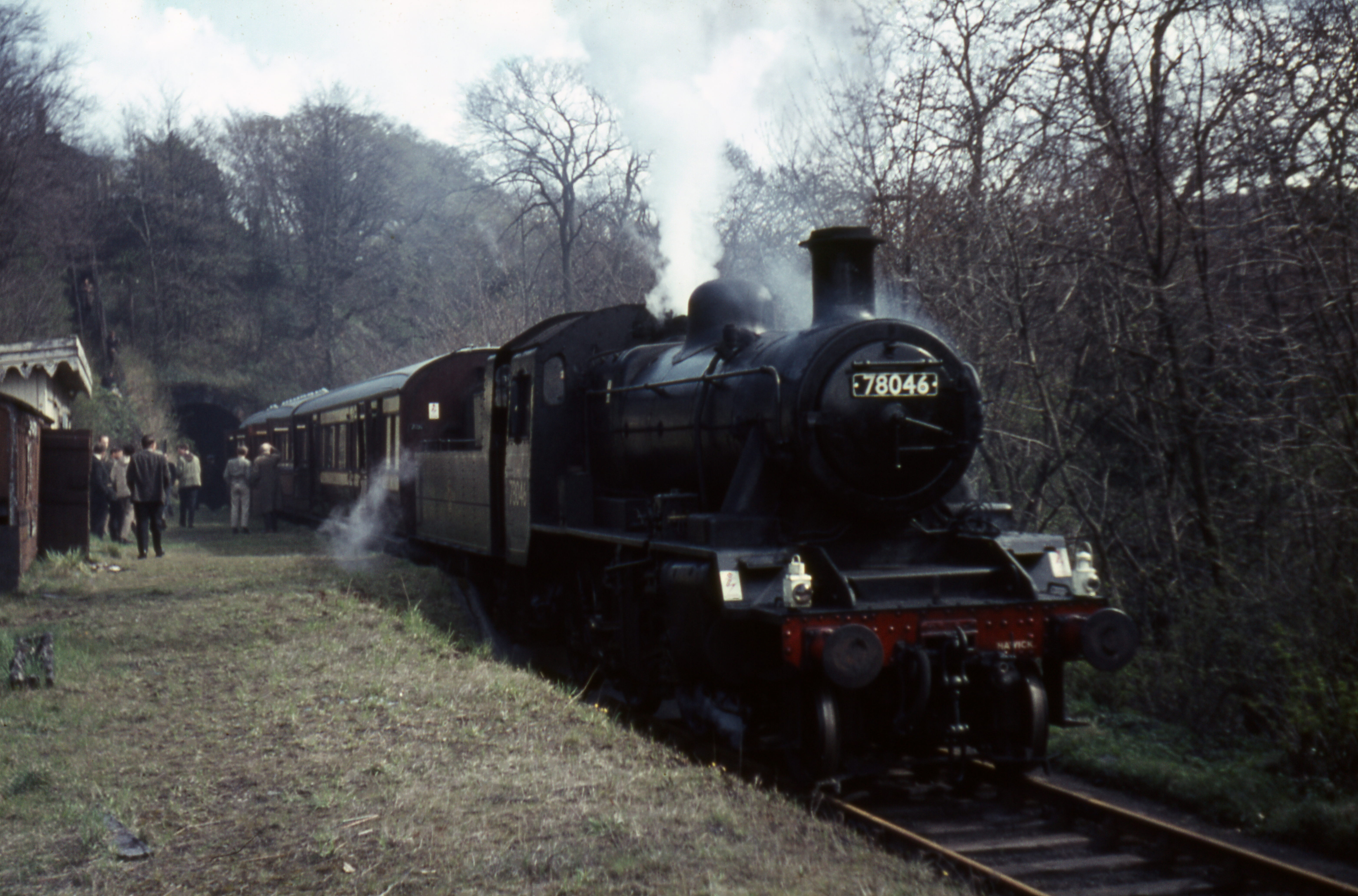
- A Scottish Rambler Tour in 1965

General information
- Location: Edinburgh; Scotland
- Grid reference: NT213690
- Platforms: 1

Other information
- Status: Disused

History
- Pre-grouping: Caledonian Railway
- Post-grouping: London Midland and Scottish Railway

Key dates
- 1 August 1874: Station opens
- 1 November 1943 (Last train): Station closes (LMS Last train)
- 1 June 1949: Station closes (BR Officially)
- 4 December 1967: Line closes to goods traffic
Location

Colinton railway station was opened in 1874 and served the area of the then village of Colinton that now forms part of the city of Edinburgh, with Colinton House nearby. Although primarily built as a goods line to serve the many mills on the Water of Leith, a passenger service was provided by the Caledonian Railway using the Balerno Loop and after grouping by the London, Midland and Scottish Railway, seeing formal closure to passenger traffic shortly after nationalisation.

== History ==
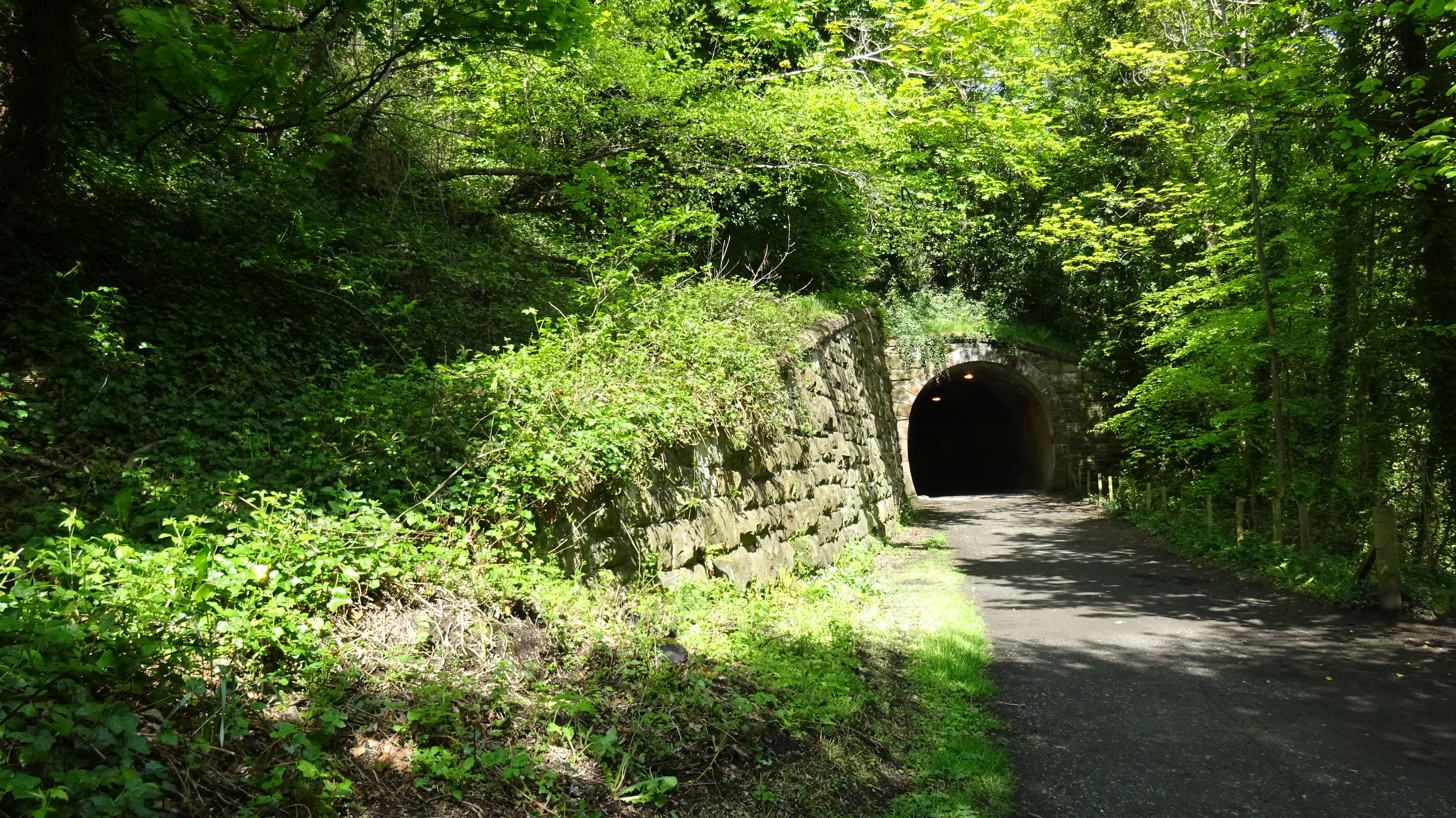
Jacobs Ladder site and Colinton Tunnel west portal.

Opened by the Caledonian Railway, it became part of the London Midland and Scottish Railway during the Grouping of 1923, and the LMS ran the last train to serve the station in 1943 with the expectation that the line would re-open after the war. The 20.19 to Edinburgh had been the last train and carried 24 passengers. The line passed to the Scottish Region of British Railways upon nationalisation in 1948 who then officially closed Colinton in 1949. Tight curves on the line resulted in slow speeds and made the line vulnerable to competition from tram services. It had once been very popular with families wishing to go for a day out in the country.

== Infrastructure ==
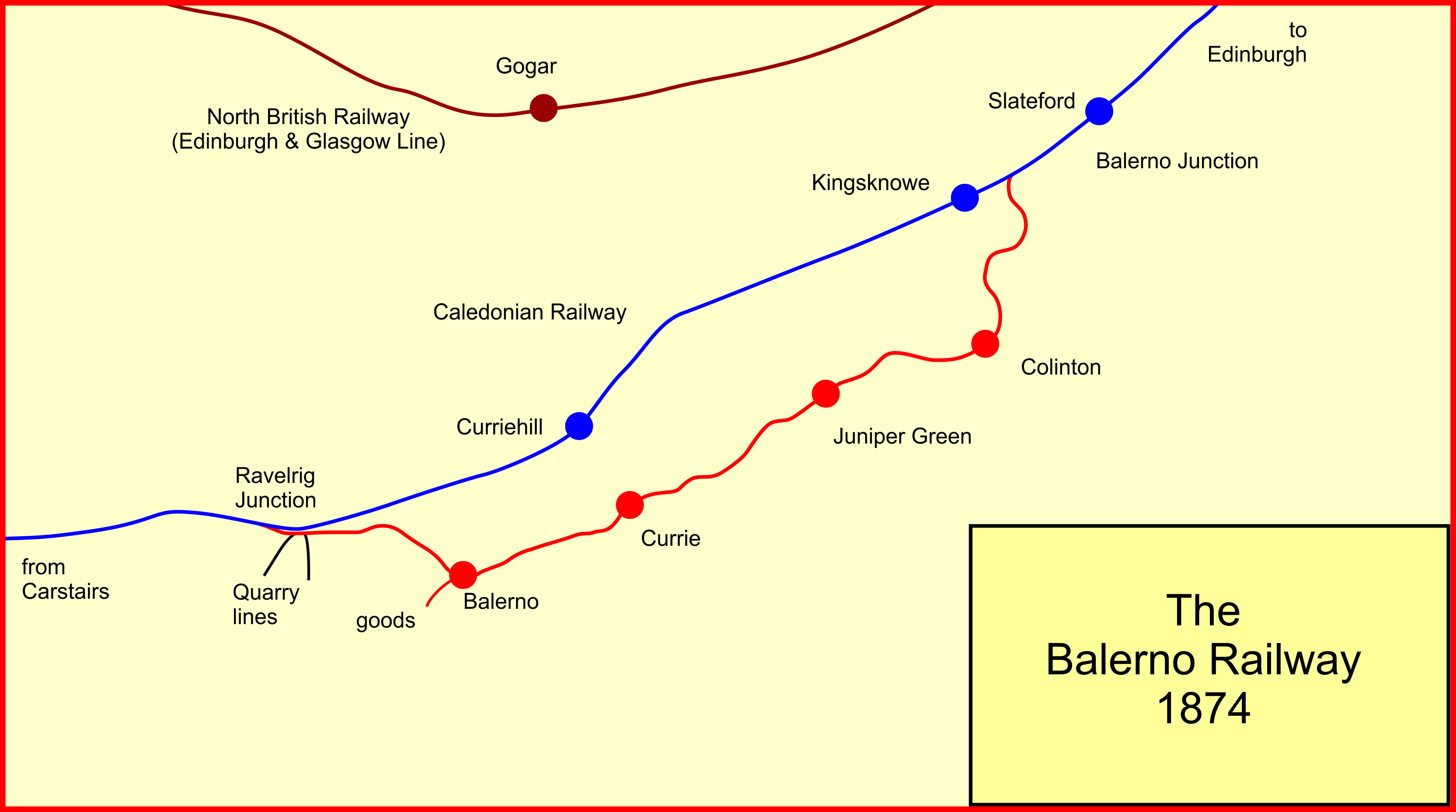
The Balerno railway of the Caledonian Railway

The station had a single platform and was located on the northern side of the single track line just to the west of Colinton Tunnel with a typical Caledonian Railway style small wooden station building with a canopy. The goods yard, also on the north side of the line, was served from the west side of the station and had an open ended goods shed and a bay siding. The Water of Leith lies nearby and an overbridge crossed the railway and the river. A signalbox lay to the west near the junction of the West Mills (corn and paper) goods branch.

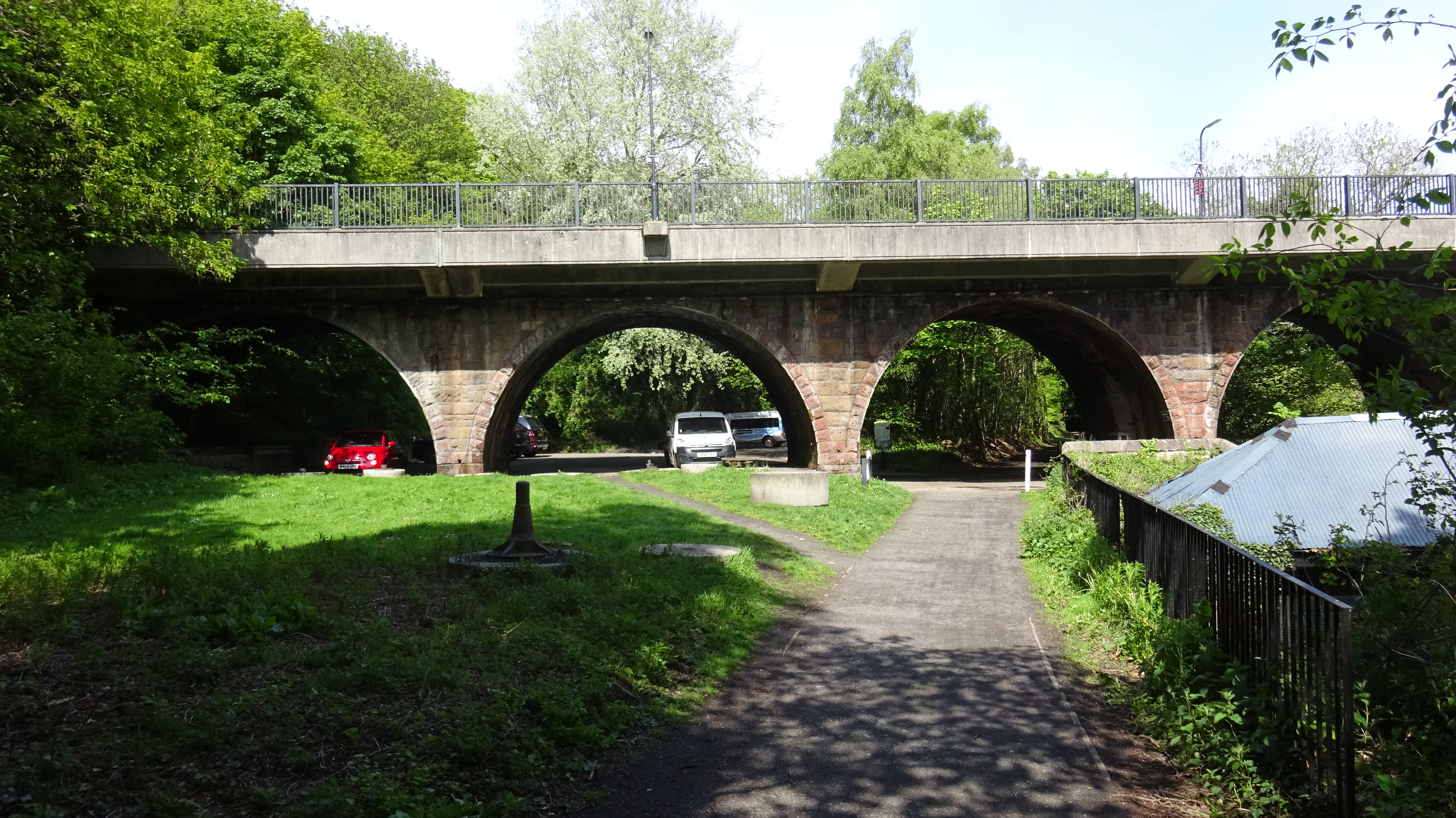
The overbridge and the old crane base from the west.

A set of steep steps, known locally as 'Jacob's Ladder' gave access to the area above the tunnel portal where the stationmaster's house was located, one occupant being John Kerr. An old passenger carriage body sat close to the station building for many years.

The OS map of 1893 shows the goods shed with two other sidings, a weighing machine, a crane and several small buildings associated with the goods yards. The goods shed and a siding are still shown on the 1955 OS map, the passenger station having closed in 1943.

Preceding station	Historical railways	Following station
Hailes Halt	Caledonian Railway; Balerno Loop	Juniper Green

== The site today ==
The station is now part of the Water of Leith cyclepath that follows much of the route of the Balerno Loop and the goods yard is a car park.
