= Currie railway station =

Former railway station in Scotland

Coordinates: 55.8950°N 3.3105°W

Currie
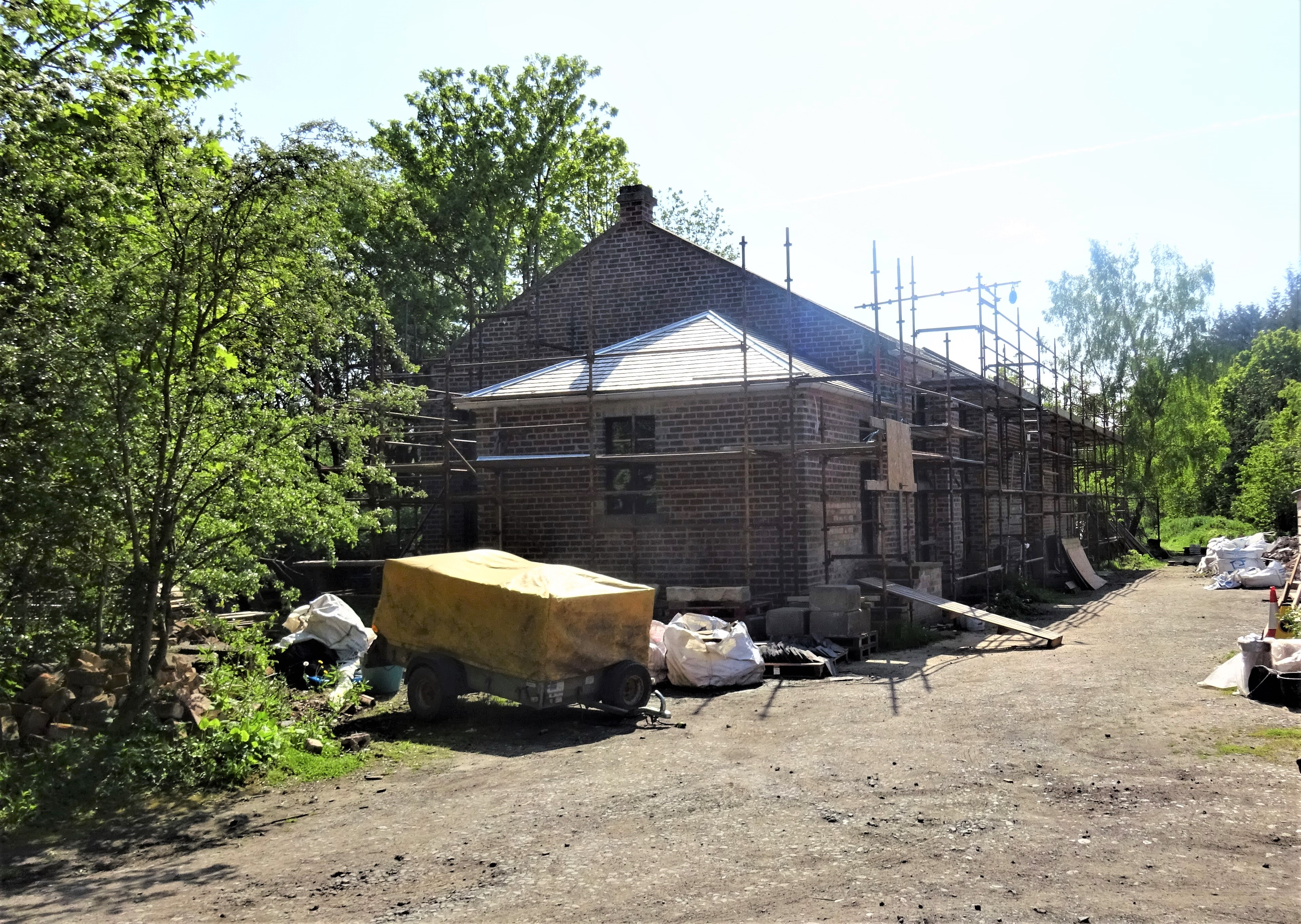
- The old goods shed in 2019

General information
- Location: Edinburgh; Scotland
- Grid reference: NT198685
- Platforms: 2

Other information
- Status: Disused

History
- Original company: Caledonian Railway
- Pre-grouping: Caledonian Railway
- Post-grouping: London Midland and Scottish Railway

Key dates
- 1 August 1874: Station opens
- 1 November 1943 (Last train): Station closes (LMS Last train)
- 1 June 1949: Station closes (BR Officially)
- 4 December 1967: Line closes to goods traffic
Location

Currie railway station was opened in 1874 and served the area of the village of Currie that now forms part of the city of Edinburgh. Although primarily built as a goods line to serve the many mills on the Water of Leith, a passenger service was provided by the Caledonian Railway using the Balerno Loop and after grouping by the London, Midland and Scottish Railway, seeing formal closure to passenger traffic shortly after nationalisation. The station was the largest on the 'loop' line and lay in rural surroundings and had once been popular with families having a day out in the country.

== History ==
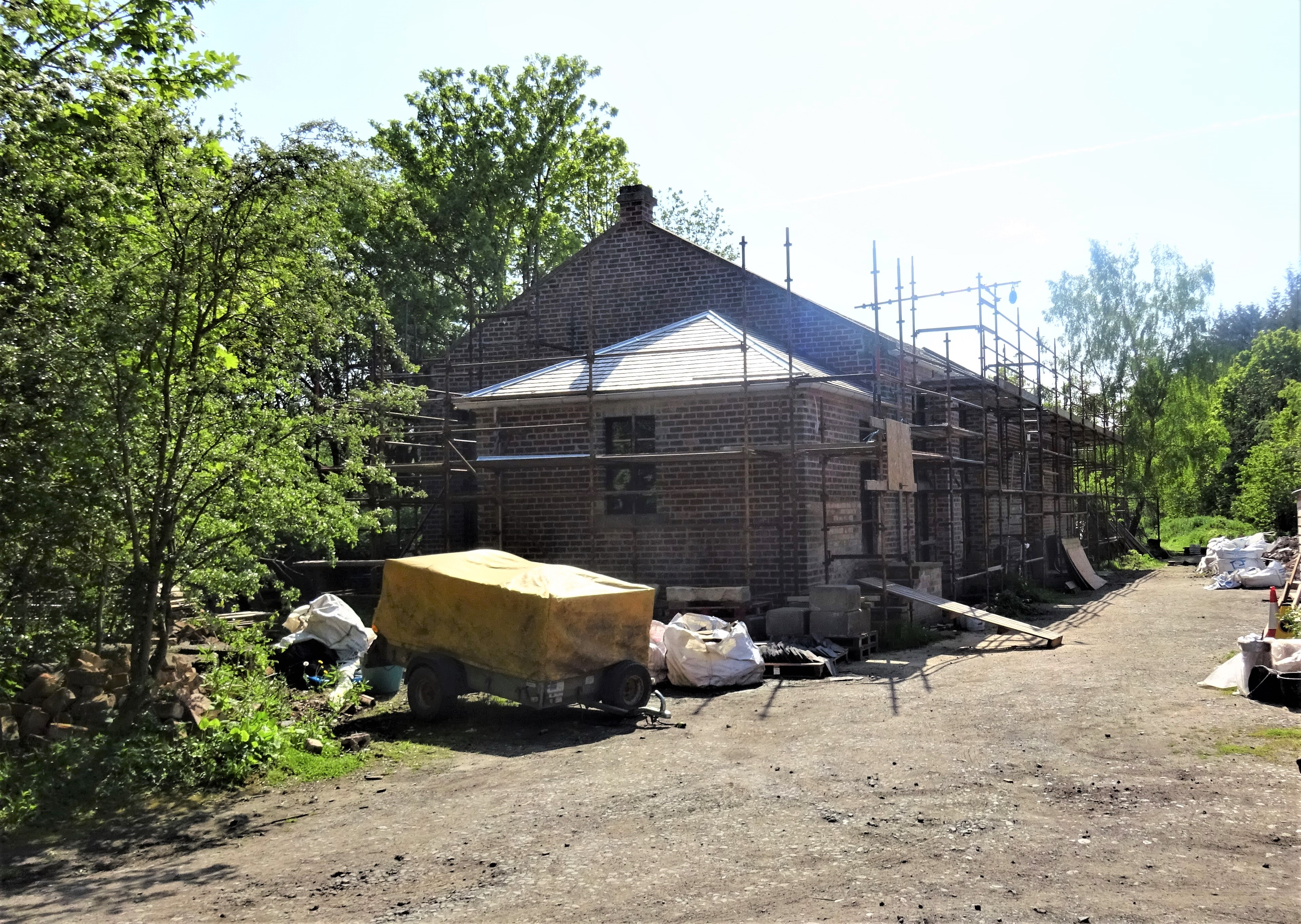
Currie goods shed undergoing conversion into a private house.

Opened by the Caledonian Railway, it became part of the London Midland and Scottish Railway during the Grouping of 1923, and the LMS ran the last train to serve the station in 1943 with the expectation that the line would re-open after the war. The line passed to the Scottish Region of British Railways upon nationalisation in 1948 who then officially closed Currie in 1949. The line had many tight curves and the low line speeds made it vulnerable to competition from road transport.

== Infrastructure ==
The station had a passing loop, two wooden platforms, a pedestrian overbridge with the ticket office, waiting room, etc. located on the northern side of the single track line with a typical Caledonian Railway style small wooden station building with a short canopy. The goods yard, on the south side of the line, was served from the west side of the station and had a large goods shed. A signalbox was located on the westbound platform at the west end. The station was host to a LMS caravan from 1936 to 1939.

The OS map of 1893 shows the goods shed with one other siding and a siding running parallel to the main line, a weighing machine and several small buildings associated with the goods yards. By 1967 the platforms had been removed, the passing loop remained and the station building was still intact.

Preceding station	Historical railways	Following station
Juniper Green	Caledonian Railway; Balerno Loop	Balerno

== The site today ==
The station is now part of the Water of Leith Walkway that follows much of the route of the Balerno Loop. The platforms survive only as low earthen mounds and the old goods shed was used by the council for storage.
