= Juniper Green =

Village near Edinburgh, Scotland

Coordinates: 55.903362°N 3.286891°W

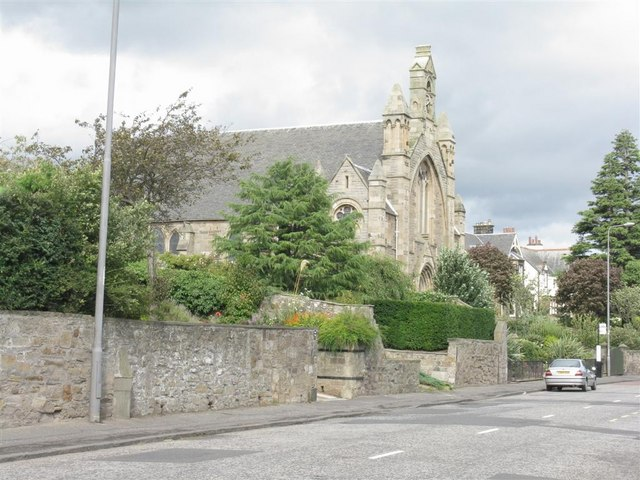
- The parish church

- Location within the City of Edinburgh council area Location within Scotland
- OS grid reference: NT195685
- Council area: City of Edinburgh
- Country: Scotland
- Sovereign state: United Kingdom
- Post town: JUNIPER GREEN
- Postcode district: EH14
- Dialling code: 0131
- Police: Scotland
- Fire: Scottish
- Ambulance: Scottish
- UK Parliament: Edinburgh South West
- Scottish Parliament: Edinburgh Pentlands

Juniper Green is a village on the outskirts of Edinburgh, Scotland, situated about 5.5 miles (8.9 km) south-west of the city centre. It bridges the city bypass, and extends along the foothills of the Pentlands. It is bordered by Colinton to the east, Baberton immediately to the north, and Currie to the south-west. It centres on Lanark Road, the main route leading out south-west of Edinburgh into the Central Borders. The village stands on an elevated ridge above the Water of Leith to its south.

Administratively, Juniper Green falls within the jurisdiction of the City of Edinburgh Council having been officially absorbed into the city in 1920.

== History ==
Juniper Green's earliest mention is in the Kirk records of Colinton in 1707. However, it is largely called Curriemuirend up until the end of the 18th century and the area only really developed as a village from around 1810. Indeed Adair's map published in 1735 shows no sign of the village, nor does Laurie's more accurate map of 1766. Only one house in the village (Gowanlea) appears to predate 1810.

Traditionally, its major industries were paper and snuff set in the river valley of the Water of Leith. Only with the building of the Balerno line with a station serving the village did it begin to prosper and expand. The line's closure in 1955 re-distanced the village from the city centre.

Juniper Green, along with the rest of Colinton Parish, was amalgamated into Edinburgh from 1 November 1920.

The 300th anniversary of Juniper Green was celebrated throughout 2007 and the community supported many social and environmental improvement projects. The opportunity was also taken to record locals' reminiscences and collect photographs, which have been archived on the Juniper Green Village Association website. In the same year, the area was incorporated into the new Pentland Hills multi-member ward of the council.

== Buildings ==
- Juniper Green Parish Church (formerly the Free Church) built 1879, by James Graham Fairley.

== Education ==
Juniper Green is served by an eponymous Primary School. The original (designed in 1910 by John Alexander Carfrae) was closed in the mid 2010s with a new school built in adjacent land. Secondary education is provided by the nearby Currie High School.

== Culture and attractions ==
Today Juniper Green is primarily a dormitory suburb of Edinburgh with its own shops, including, a bike repair centre, an opticians, a pharmacy, a local pub, a fish and chip shop, an Indian restaurant, as well as a large selection of hairdressers.

Leisure facilities include a golf course, bowling club and tennis club. The area is served by Edinburgh Pentlands Parish Church, formed in 2024 by the union of the former Juniper Green Parish Church and the Colinton Parish Church in the nearby Colinton area.

== Media ==
C&B News – originally Currie & Balerno News – is a monthly volunteer-run “local community news magazine” (available in print and as a downloadable PDF) covering Juniper Green and neighbouring Currie, Balerno, Baberton Mains and Colinton. Originally launched in February 1976, and published 10 times a year, the magazine features local news and articles, contributions from local political representatives, and updates on local planning issues—all voluntarily submitted by local residents. The magazine published its 500th issue in October 2024and celebrated its 50th anniversary in February 2026.

A bespoke edition of the “lifestyle and community magazine” Konect is delivered to households in Juniper Green as well as neighbouring Balerno, Currie, Baberton Mains and Ratho.

== Transport ==
The A70 runs through the area and Juniper Green is served by the 44, 45 and 44N bus routes, which are operated by Lothian Buses. It also has access to Livingston through Blue Bus service 24 funded by West Lothian Council. The 33 bus service is also available via a connecting footpath to Baberton Mains.

== Community Council ==
The Juniper Green Community Council was inaugurated in November 2009. The current iteration, launched in March 2025, is officially titled Juniper Green & Baberton Mains Community Council.

== Conservation Area ==
Juniper Green Conservation Area is situated 7 miles (11 kilometres) to the west of Edinburgh around the main Lanark Road. The conservation area is centred on the historic core of Juniper Green, one of a number of villages which were absorbed into the City of Edinburgh council area. A recognisable village character still remains and the conservation area status was originally designated on 19 November 1993 to protect that character. The boundary was extended in March 2007.

== Famous residents ==
- Thomas Carlyle (1795–1881) and his wife Jane Welsh Carlyle - rented the house "Mount Pleasant" at 502, Lanark Road
- David Henry (1888–1963) - New Zealand industrialist and philanthropist was born here
- Edwin G Lucas (1911-1990) - surrealist artist
- Willie Merrilees (1898–1984) - at one time Scotland's most famous policeman
- James Murray (d.1634) - one of the first men in Scotland to be called an architect
- Berrick Saul (1924-2016) - Professor of Economic History and later Vice Chancellor of the University of York
- Michael Woodruff (1911-2001) - performed the first kidney transplant in the United Kingdom, former professor of surgery at the University of Edinburgh
