= Granton Road railway station =

Disused railway station in Trinity, Edinburgh

Granton Road
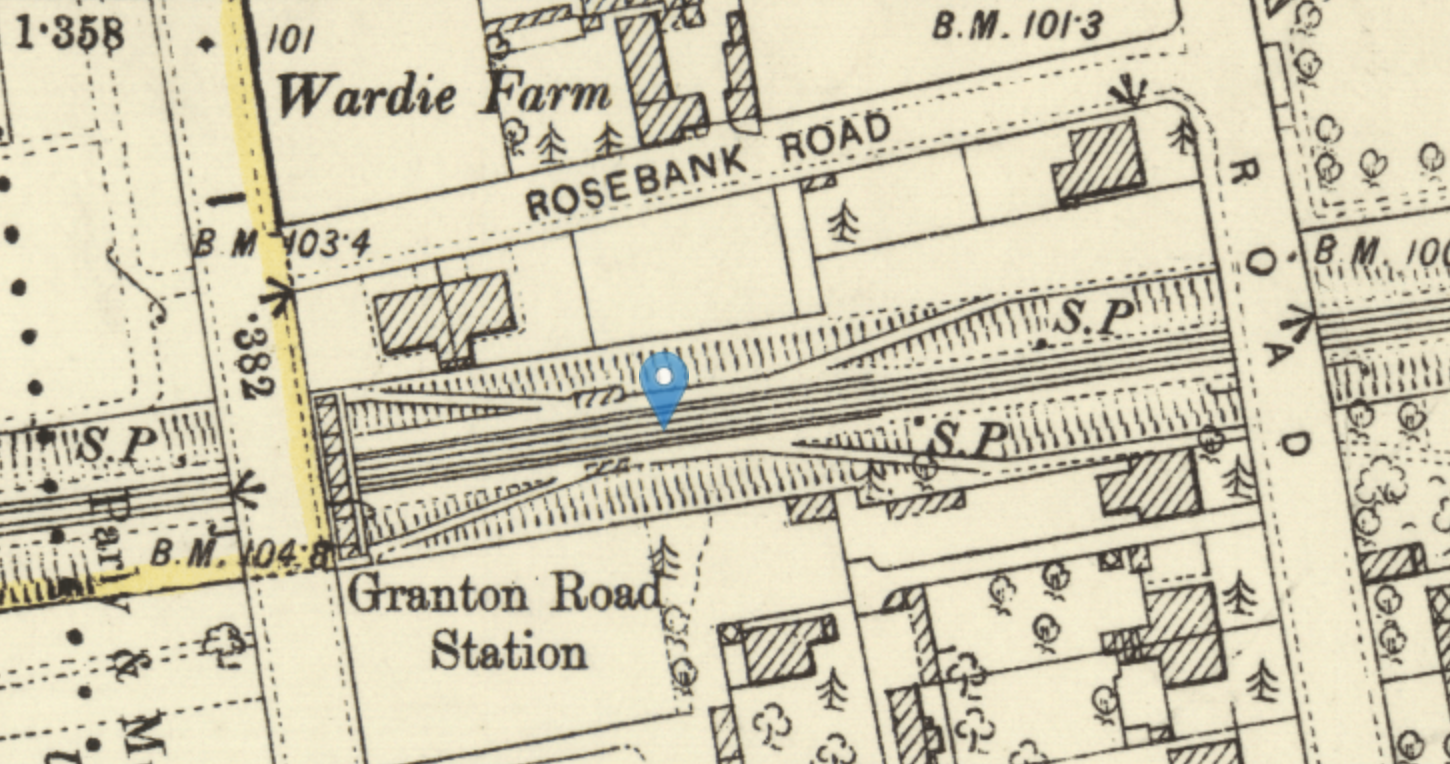

General information
- Location: Trinity, Edinburgh; Scotland
- Coordinates: 55.9722°N 3.2143°W
- Grid reference: NT243761
- Platforms: 2

Other information
- Status: Disused

History
- Original company: Caledonian Railway
- Post-grouping: London, Midland and Scottish Railway; British Railways (Scottish Region)

Key dates
- 1 August 1879: Opened
- 30 April 1962: Closed
Location

Granton Road railway station served the district of Trinity, Edinburgh, Scotland from 1879 to 1962 on the Leith Branch.

== History ==
The station opened on 1 August 1879 by the Caledonian Railway. It closed on 30 April 1962. The platforms survive and the trackbed became a footpath.

Dragon's Claw elm, a rare cultivar then known as Weeping Chinese elm and recommended for embankments, was planted above Granton Road railway station in the early 20th century, and survives there (2024).

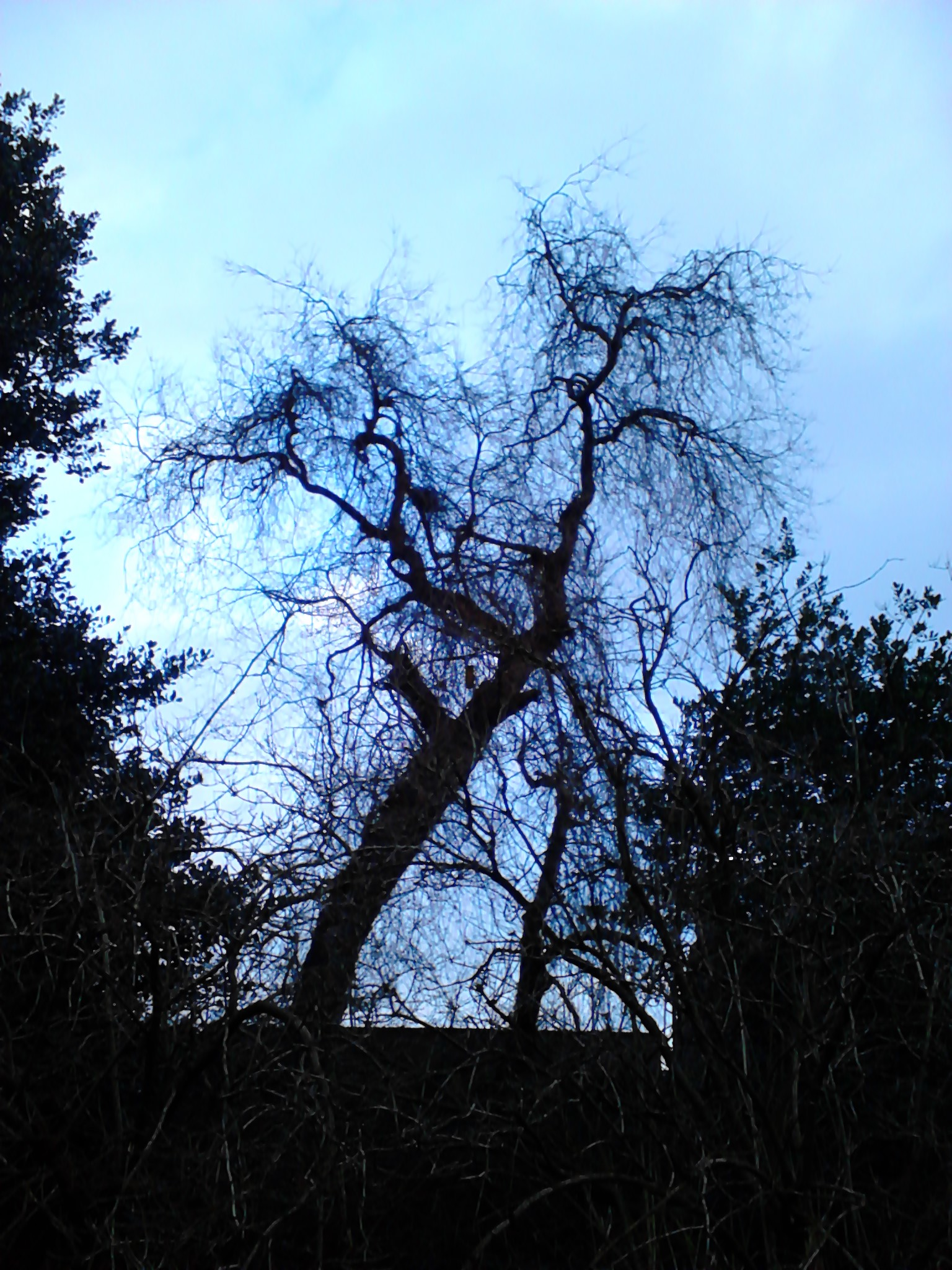
Dragon's Claw elm above the former Granton Road railway station

Preceding station	Disused railways	Following station
East Pilton; Line and station closed	Leith Branch	Leith North; Line and station closed
