= Craigleith railway station =

Disused railway station in Edinburgh, Scotland

Craigleith
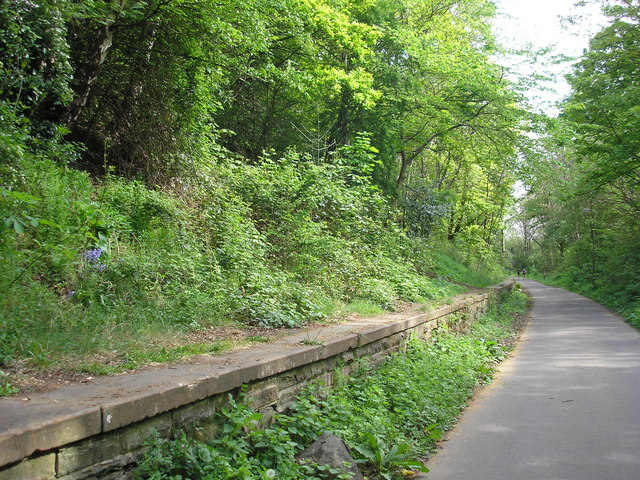
- The site of the station in 2007

General information
- Location: Craigleith, Edinburgh, Scotland
- Coordinates: 55.9562°N 3.2441°W
- Platforms: 2

Other information
- Status: Disused

History
- Original company: Caledonian Railway
- Post-grouping: London, Midland and Scottish Railway, British Railways (Scottish Region)

Key dates
- 1 August 1879: Opened
- 1 July 1922: Name changed to Craigleith for Blackhall
- 30 April 1962: Closed
Location

Craigleith railway station served the area of Craigleith, in Edinburgh, Scotland, from 1879 until its closure in 1962. It was located on the Leith Branch and the Barnton Branch.

== History ==
The station was opened on 1 August 1879 by the Caledonian Railway and featured two goods sidings to the east, one of which served Craigleith Quarry. The station's name was changed to Craigleith for Blackhall on 1 July 1922. The station was ultimately closed on 30 April 1962.

Preceding station	Disused railways	Following station
Murrayfield; Line and station closed	Leith Branch	East Pilton; Line and station closed
Terminus	Barnton Branch	House o'Hill Halt; Line and station closed

== The site today ==
The platforms remain extant and the trackbed through the disused station forms part of a rail trail, the Roseburn Path. In 2025, the path was announced as the preferred route for a new Edinburgh Trams line between Granton in the north of the city and the Royal Infirmary in the south-east.
