= East Pilton railway station =

Disused railway station in East Pilton, Edinburgh

Coordinates: 55.9709°N 3.2295°W

East Pilton

General information
- Location: East Pilton, Edinburgh; Scotland
- Platforms: 2

Other information
- Status: Disused

History
- Original company: London, Midland and Scottish Railway; British Railways (Scottish Region)

Key dates
- 1 December 1934: Opened as East Pilton
- November 1938: Name changed to East Pilton Halt
- 30 April 1962: Closed
Location

East Pilton railway station served the area of East Pilton, Edinburgh, Scotland from 1934 to 1962 on the Leith Branch.

== History ==
The station opened on 1 December 1934 by the London, Midland and Scottish Railway. The station's name was changed to East Pilton Halt in November . The station closed on 30 April 1962.

Preceding station	Disused railways	Following station
Craigleith; Line and station closed	Leith Branch	Granton Road; Line and station closed
