= House o'Hill Halt railway station =

Disused railway station in Edinburgh, Scotland

Coordinates: 55.964229°N 3.259948°W

House o'Hill Halt

General information
- Location: House o Hill, Edinburgh, Scotland
- Platforms: 2

Other information
- Status: Disused

History
- Original company: London, Midland and Scottish Railway

Key dates
- 1 February 1937: Opened
- 7 May 1951: Closed
Location

House o'Hill Halt railway station served the area of House o Hill, in Edinburgh, Scotland, between 1937 and 1951. It was a stop on the Barnton Branch.

== History ==
The station was opened on 1 February 1937 by the London, Midland and Scottish Railway. The suffix 'halt' was dropped from its name in Bradshaw's Guide later that year. It was closed on 7 May 1951.

Preceding station	Disused railways	Following station
Craigleith; Line and station closed	London, Midland and Scottish Railway; Barnton Branch	Davidson's Mains; Line and station closed

== The site today ==
The trackbed through the former halt forms part of a rail trail, the Roseburn Path. In 2025, the path was announced as the preferred route for a new Edinburgh Trams line between Granton in the north of the city and the Royal Infirmary in the south-east.
