= Dalry Road railway station =

Disused railway station in Dalry, Edinburgh

Dalry Road

General information
- Location: Dalry, Edinburgh; Scotland
- Coordinates: 55.9409°N 3.221°W
- Grid reference: NT238726
- Platforms: 2

Other information
- Status: Disused

History
- Original company: Caledonian Railway
- Post-grouping: London, Midland and Scottish Railway; British Railways (Scottish Region)

Key dates
- 2 July 1900: Opened
- 30 April 1962: Closed
Location

Dalry Road railway station served the area of Dalry, Edinburgh, Scotland from 1900 to 1962 on the Leith Branch.

== History ==
The station opened on 2 July 1900 by the Caledonian Railway. It closed to passengers on 30 April 1962. The line closed two years later, in 1964.

Preceding station	Disused railways	Following station
Edinburgh Princes Street; Line and station closed	Leith Branch	Murrayfield; Line and station closed
