= Murrayfield railway station =

Disused railway station in Murrayfield, Edinburgh

Murrayfield
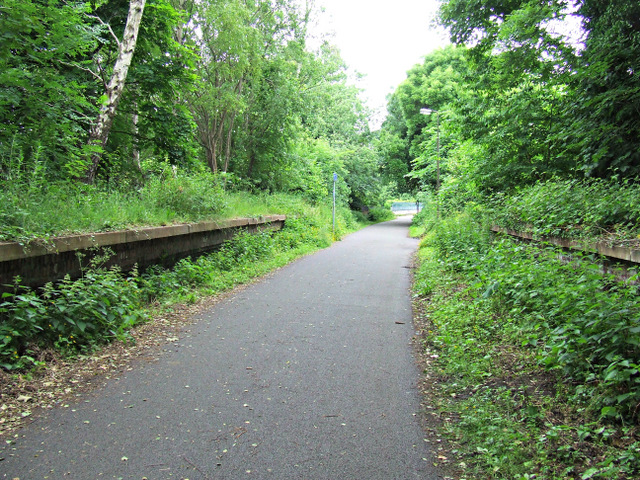
- Platform remains in 2013

General information
- Location: Murrayfield, Edinburgh; Scotland
- Coordinates: 55.9455°N 3.232°W
- Grid reference: NT231731
- Platforms: 2

Other information
- Status: Disused

History
- Original company: Caledonian Railway
- Post-grouping: London, Midland and Scottish Railway; British Railways (Scottish Region)

Key dates
- 1 August 1879: Opened
- 30 April 1962: Closed
Location

Murrayfield railway station served the area of Murrayfield, Edinburgh, Scotland from 1879 to 1962 on the Leith Branch.

== History ==
The station opened on 1 August 1879 by the Caledonian Railway. There was a large goods yard as well as Coltbridge Stone Depot. Two signal boxes were built, one to the north of the southbound platform and the other to the southwest. These were later removed and replaced by a single box to the northwest, next to the goods yard. It was downgraded to a ground frame in 1944. The station closed on 30 April 1962.

Preceding station	Disused railways	Following station
Dalry Road; Line and station closed	Leith Branch	Craigleith; Line and station closed
