= Davidson's Mains railway station =

Disused railway station in Davidson's Mains, Edinburgh

Davidson's Mains
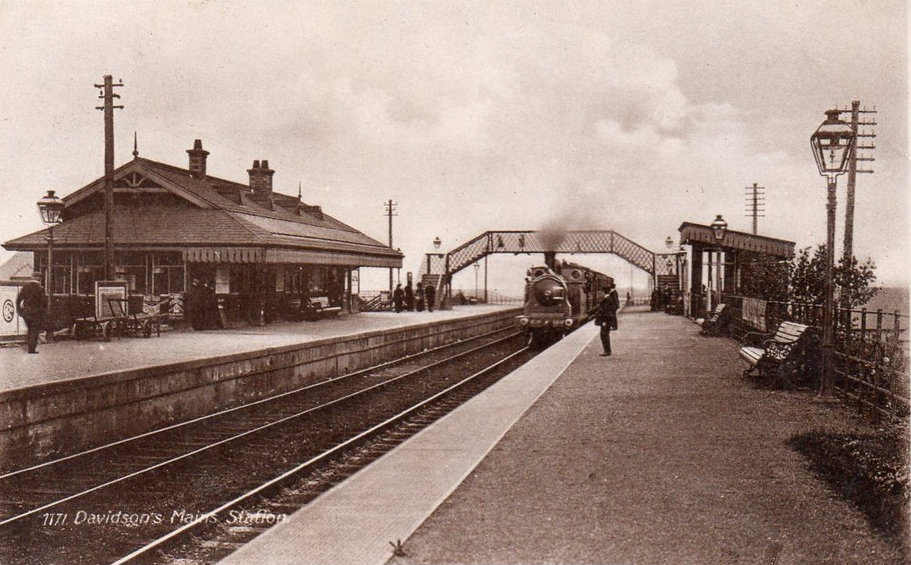
- The station in 1906

General information
- Location: Davidson's Mains, Edinburgh; Scotland
- Coordinates: 55.9662°N 3.277°W
- Grid reference: NT203755
- Platforms: 2

Other information
- Status: Disused

History
- Original company: Caledonian Railway
- Post-grouping: London, Midland and Scottish Railway; British Railways (Scottish Region)

Key dates
- 1 March 1894: Opened as Barnton Gate
- 1 April 1903: Name changed to Davidson's Mains
- 7 May 1951: Closed
Location

Davidson's Mains railway station served the district of Davidson's Mains, Edinburgh, Scotland from 1894 to 1951 on the Barnton Branch.

== History ==
The station opened as Barnton Gate on 1 March 1894 by the Caledonian Railway. The station's name was changed to Davidson's Mains on 1 April 1903. To the southeast was Davidson's Mains Goods Yard. It was located next to Barnton House instead of Davidson's Mains, which was to the southeast. The station closed on 7 May 1951 along with the line. The site is now housing.

Preceding station	Disused railways	Following station
House o'Hill Halt; Line and station closed	Caledonian Railway; Barnton Branch	Barnton; Line and station closed
