= Newhaven railway station (Edinburgh) =

Disused railway station in Newhaven, Edinburgh

Newhaven
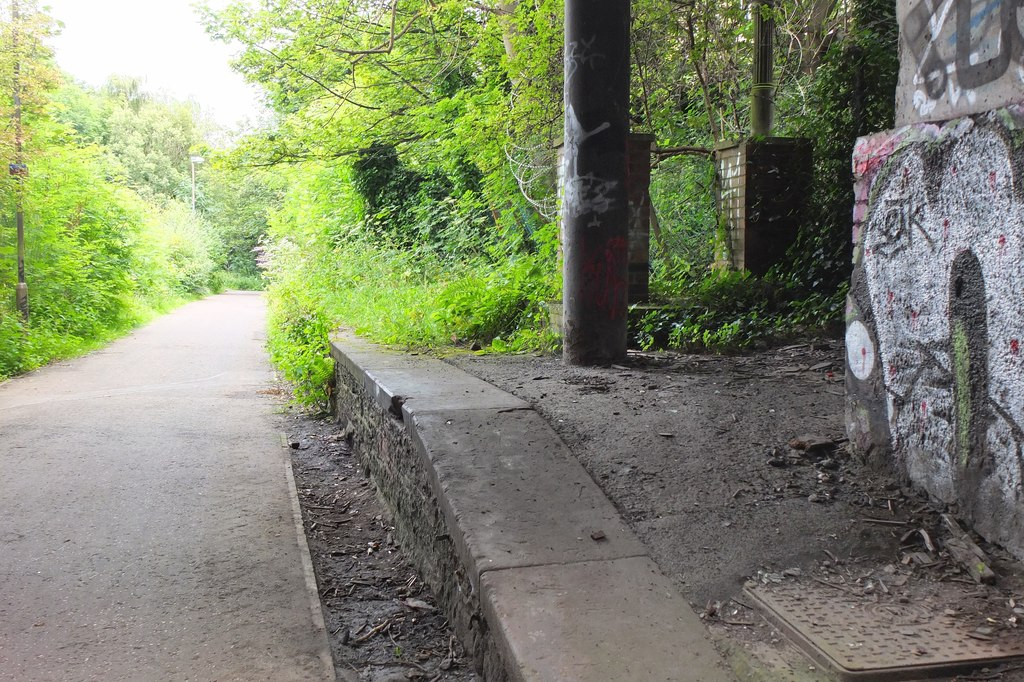
- One of the disused platforms in 2016

General information
- Location: Newhaven, Edinburgh; Scotland
- Coordinates: 55.9764°N 3.1967°W
- Grid reference: NT254765
- Platforms: 2 (initially); 4 (later added)

Other information
- Status: Disused

History
- Original company: Caledonian Railway
- Pre-grouping: Caledonian Railway
- Post-grouping: London, Midland and Scottish Railway; British Railways (Scottish Region)

Key dates
- 1 August 1879: Opened
- 30 April 1962: Closed
Location

Newhaven railway station served the area of Newhaven, Edinburgh, Scotland, from 1879 to 1962 on the Leith North Passenger Branch.

== History ==
The station was opened on 1 August 1879 by the Caledonian Railway. The station building and its offices were on Craighall Road. There were two goods yards: Newhaven Goods and Minerals and Leith High Depot. Two additional platforms were built in 1902 to serve the Leith New Lines. The station closed on 30 April 1962.

Preceding station	Disused railways	Following station
Terminus	Caledonian Railway; Leith North Passenger Branch	Leith North; Line and station closed
