= Davidson's Mains =

Village and district of Edinburgh, Scotland

Coordinates: 55°57′55.40″N 3°16′27.58″W

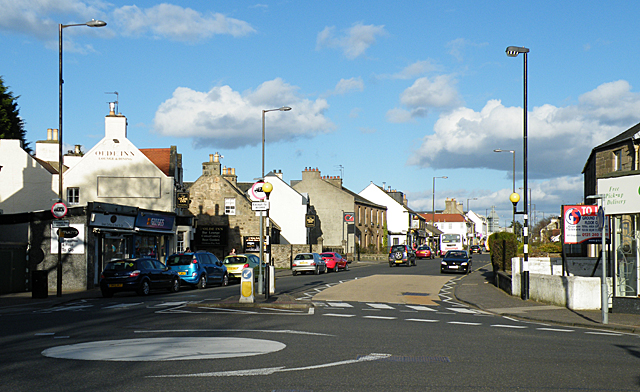
- Main Street

- Location within the City of Edinburgh council area Location within Scotland
- OS grid reference: NT204755
- Council area: City of Edinburgh
- Lieutenancy area: Edinburgh
- Country: Scotland
- Sovereign state: United Kingdom
- Post town: EDINBURGH
- Postcode district: EH4
- Dialling code: 0131
- Police: Scotland
- Fire: Scottish
- Ambulance: Scottish
- UK Parliament: Edinburgh West
- Scottish Parliament: Edinburgh Northern

Davidson's Mains is a former village and now a district in the north-west of Edinburgh, Scotland. It is adjacent to the districts of Barnton, Cramond, Silverknowes, Blackhall and Corbiehill/House O'Hill. It was absorbed into Edinburgh as part of the boundary changes in 1920 and is part of the EH4 postcode area.

The name is sometimes abbreviated to D'Mains.

== Etymology ==
Davidson's Mains is named after William Davidson, a wealthy merchant who bought the nearby estate of Muirhouse in 1776. "Mains" is the Scots word for an estate farm or home farm.

Prior to the 19th century, it was known as Muttonhole. That name appears on an 1845 map, but was replaced by Davidson's Mains on the 1852 Ordnance Survey. Locals continued to use the name Muttonhole until at least 1860. According to Stuart Harris, a suggestion that mutton- derives from the Anglian (ge)mythe, meaning the junction of roads or streams, does not stand up in the light of several other places named Muttonhole in lowland Scotland. Rather, the name is Early Scots mouton holh or halh, a place were moutons or wedder lambs were pastured.

== History ==
The original village runs east–west and is still identifiable as a series of modest cottages on each side of the road. Quality Street was added in 1827, designed by James Gillespie Graham. The church on Quality Street was built as Cramond Free Church in 1843 and is by David Cousin. The railway arrived late in 1894 but spurred villa development to the north and north-west.

== Description ==
Within the district there is a variety of shops and businesses, ranging from cobblers to large supermarkets, as well as food outlets of various kinds. The district is also served by four churches, a Tesco, a doctor's surgery, two dental surgeries, the Corbie and other takeaways, Davidson's Mains Primary School and a Greggs. The state secondary school that serves the area is the Royal High School. Davidson's Mains Park is near the high school which has a play park and a football pitch.

== Public Transport ==
Davidson's Mains railway station closed in 1951 prior to the Beeching cuts due to underuse. The area lay beyond the Edinburgh tram network.

The district is currently served by two bus routes run by Lothian Buses: the 21, which runs between the Gyle Centre and the Royal Infirmary, and the 47, which runs between Cammo and Penicuik.
