= Ravelrig Junction Platform railway station =

Former railway station in Scotland

Coordinates: 55.8939°N 3.3708°W

Ravelrig Junction Platform

General information
- Location: Edinburgh; Scotland
- Grid reference: NT143676
- Platforms: 2

Other information
- Status: Disused

History
- Original company: Caledonian Railway
- Pre-grouping: Caledonian Railway
- Post-grouping: London Midland and Scottish Railway

Key dates
- 4 April 1884: Station opens
- 1 July 1920: Station closes
- Circa 1927: Ravelrig Platform for Dalmahoy Golf Course opens
- 1930: Station closes
- 1 November 1943: LMS Last train on the Balerno line
- 1 June 1949: Balerno Line stations close (BR Officially)
- 4 December 1967: Balerno Line closes to goods traffic
Location

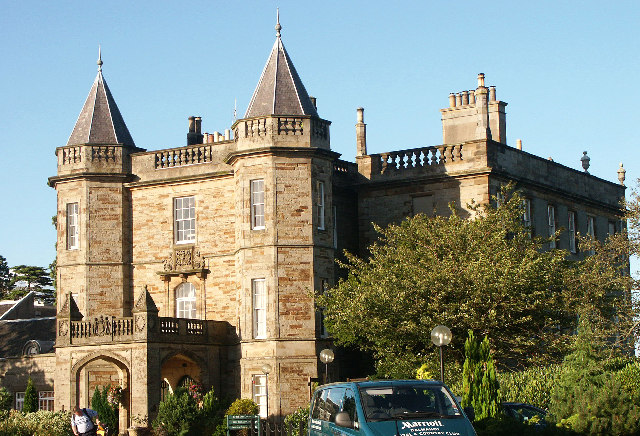
Dalmahoy Hotel.

Ravelrig Junction Platform railway station or Ravelrig Halt was originally opened in 1884 as a two platform station on the Shotts line on the edge of the Dalmahoy Estate in an area that now forms part of the city of Edinburgh. It stood just to the west of Ravelrig Junction that served the Balerno Loop Line. After closure in 1920 Ravelrig Platform for Dalmahoy Golf Course was opened at the same site around 1927 as a single platform when the Dalmahoy Estate became a hotel with a golf course, however it is stated to have closed in 1930. The site may have also served a military purpose.

The Balerno Loop Line had been primarily built as a goods line, with a dedicated goods station at Balerno, serving the many mills on the Water of Leith, however a passenger service was provided by the Caledonian Railway and after grouping by the London, Midland and Scottish Railway, seeing formal closure to passenger traffic shortly after nationalisation.

A halt (NT151673) is indicated on the accompanying map to have existed for a short time circa 1903 on the Balerno line, 75 chains from Balerno railway station and 23 chains from Ravelrig junction. This would have been ideally located to serve the workers at the large Ravelrig quarries.

== History ==
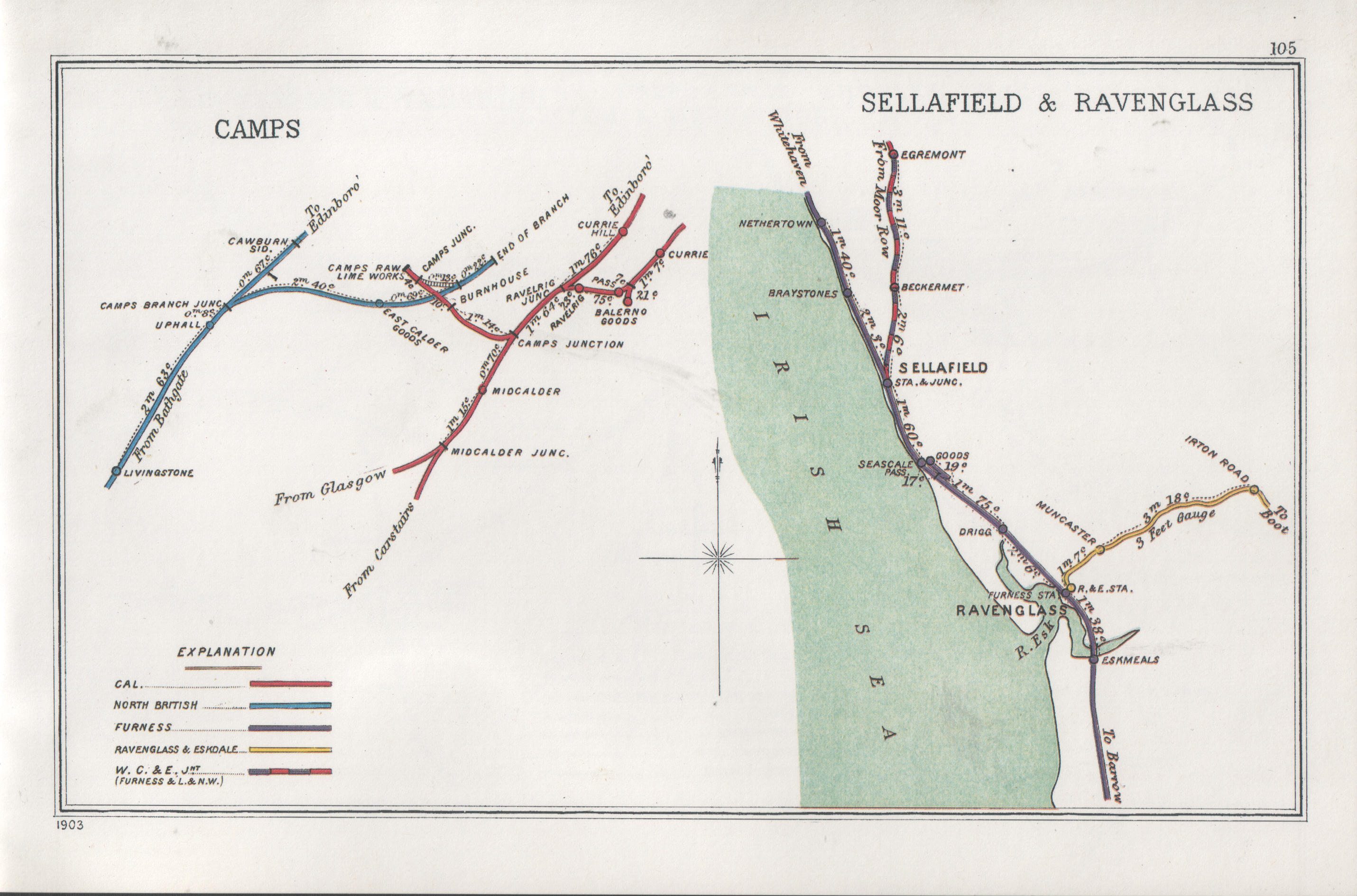
A 1903 map including Balerno, Ravelrig and Raverig Junction

Opened by the Caledonian Railway, the Balerno loop line became part of the London Midland and Scottish Railway during the Grouping of 1923, and the LMS ran the last train to serve the Balerno line stations in 1943 with the expectation that the line would re-open after the war. The line passed to the Scottish Region of British Railways upon nationalisation in 1948 who then officially closed the loop line in 1949. The line had many tight curves and the low line speeds (20 mph) made it highly vulnerable to competition from road transport.

=== Ravelrig Junction and Ravelrig Platform stations ===
The Balerno Loop line joined the Shotts Line at Ravelrig Junction with Ravelrig Junction Platform station located just to the west from 1884 until 1920, opening ten years after the Balerno line, possibly to serve the Dalmahoy Estate as was so often the case in Victorian times. The golf course at Dalmahoy did not open until 1927 and a photograph shows a single platformed station with a name board proclaiming 'Ravelrig Platform for Dalmahoy Golf Course' with steps and a path down from the road overbridge near Dalmahoy Mains Farm. No intact platform survived on the other side of the double track Shotts line at that time although steps are shown on the same overbridge indicating that a platform had once existed. In 1893 a signal existed on both of the platforms. The station had no shelter, lighting or sidings.

The presence of a single platform indicates that the station was mainly or only served by trains on the Balerno line as a likely request stop, only during daylight hours as suggested by a lack of lighting. The junction stood nearby with no crossover points.

=== Ravelrig Quarry Halt ===
The remains of a loading platform, opposite the Ravelrig Junction Cottages, for transhipment between the quarry tramways and the standard gauge exchange sidings survives and this may have doubled as the worker's platform.

Preceding station	Historical railways	Following station
Balerno	Caledonian Railway; Balerno Loop	Midcalder
