= Dalmahoy =

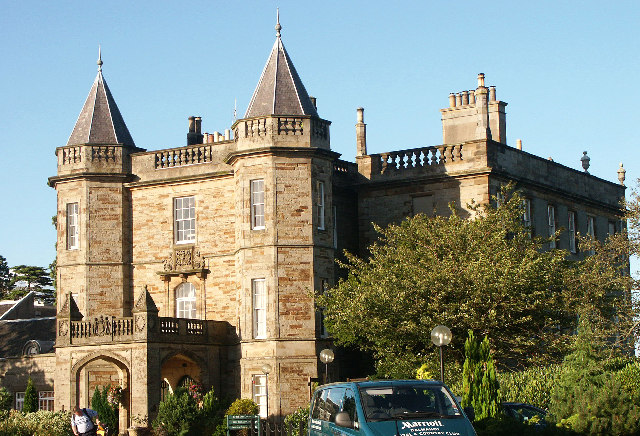
- Entrance front of Dalmahoy House

- Location within the City of Edinburgh council area
- 55.903566°N 3.369435°W

Listed Building – Category A
- Designated: 22 January 1971
- Reference no.: LB27021

Dalmahoy (Scottish Gaelic: Dail MoThua) is a hotel and former country house near Edinburgh, Scotland. It is located off the A71 road, 3.5 kilometres (2.2 mi) south of Ratho. The house is protected as a category A listed building,

== History ==
The estate was the property of the Dalmahoys until the early 18th century. James VI of Scotland stayed at the old castle in April 1589 while hunting. James VI hunted at Dalmahoy with his brother-in-law, the Duke of Holstein on 18 March 1598.

The present house was built in 1725 for George Dalrymple, a younger son of the Earl of Stair, and was designed by the architect William Adam (1689–1748). Dalmahoy was sold in 1750 to James Douglas, 14th Earl of Morton.

In 1787 an extension and a number of alteration were made to designs by Alexander Laing. Further alterations were made in the 1830s, involving William Burn, and in 1851 by Brown and Wardrop. In 1927 the house was leased and converted to a hotel, with golf courses being established in the grounds.

Circa 1927 a dedicated station was opened on the Shotts line to serve Dalmahoy's new golf course. Ravelrig Platform for Dalmahoy Golf Course is recorded as having closed by 1930.

The present hotel was built in 1990, and comprises substantial extensions to the original building and the golf course/hotel complex played host to the second ever (and first in Europe) Solheim Cup in 1992. Dalmahoy is now an independent hotel.
