= Barnton railway station =

Disused railway station in Barnton, Edinburgh

Barnton
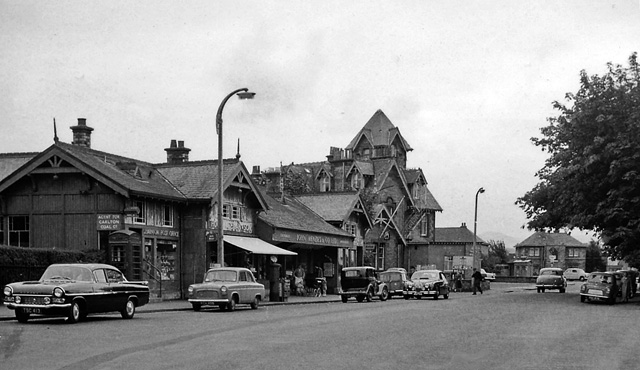
- The site of the station in 1962

General information
- Location: Barnton, Edinburgh; Scotland
- Coordinates: 55.9615°N 3.3057°W
- Grid reference: NT185750
- Platforms: 1

Other information
- Status: Disused

History
- Original company: Caledonian Railway
- Post-grouping: London, Midland and Scottish Railway; British Railways (Scottish Region)

Key dates
- 1 March 1894: Opened as Cramond Brig
- 1 April 1903: Name changed to Barnton
- 7 May 1951: Closed
Location

Barnton railway station served the village of Barnton, Edinburgh, Scotland from 1894 to 1951 on the Barnton Branch.

== History ==
The station opened as Cramond Brig on 1 March 1894 by the Caledonian Railway. To the north was a goods yard which had a loading bank and a goods shed. The signal box, which opened with the station, was to the east. After Barnton village was developed, the station's name was changed to Barnton on 1 April 1903. The station closed on 7 May 1951.

| Preceding station | Disused railways | Following station |
|---|---|---|
| Terminus | Caledonian Railway; Barnton Branch | Davidson's Mains; Line and station closed |
