= Ulmus pumila 'Pendula' =

Elm cultivar

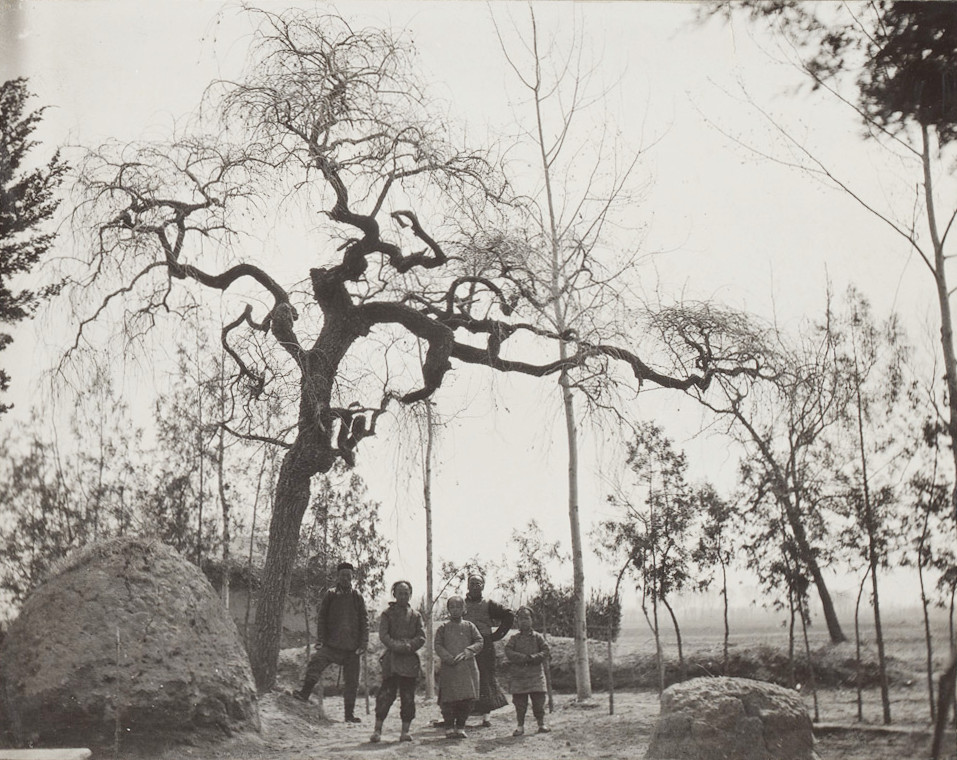
- U. pumila 'Pendula', Fengtai, 1908
- Species: Ulmus pumila
- Cultivar: 'Pendula'
- Origin: China

The Siberian Elm cultivar Ulmus pumila 'Pendula' is from northern China, where it is known as Lung chao yü shu (: Dragon's-claw elm). It was classified by Frank Meyer in Fengtai in 1908, and introduced to the United States by him from the Peking Botanical Garden as Weeping Chinese elm. The USDA plant inventory record (1916) noted that it was a "rare variety even in China". It was confirmed as an U. pumila cultivar by Krüssmann (1962).

Late 19th-century herbarium leaf-specimens suggest that the epithet 'Pendula' has been attached to more than one form of Siberian elm.

Not to be confused with the smaller Siberian elm cultivar Ulmus pumila 'Dwarf Weeper'.

The name 'Weeping Chinese elm' is now sometimes used for Ulmus parvifolia 'Sempervirens', a cultivar of the true Chinese elm.

== Description ==
Green described 'Pumila' as having pendulous branches bearing small leaves with equal teeth. Frank Meyer's clone from China is a straggling, asymmetrical tree with twisting, often level boughs and occasional tangled branch-ends, and with long pendulous pinnate branchlets, like stouter versions of 'Pinnato-ramosa'. The latter appear in Meyer's 1913 photograph of a specimen in the Peking Botanic Garden. The tree is smaller than 'Pinnato-ramosa' and does not grow to large dimensions.

== Pests and diseases ==
See under Ulmus pumila.

== Cultivation ==
Meyer's elm is still cultivated in China, where its asymmetrical, contorted habit is clear even in young specimens. It is more rarely cultivated in Europe and North America; it is said to have been "widely distributed" in the northwestern States. The USDA noted (1916) that it "shows up particularly well when planted on embankments alongside water expanses". The tree probably survives in the Longenecker Horticultural Gardens, University of Wisconsin; however, all the specimens grown at the Morton Arboretum, Illinois, obtained in the 1950s had either died or been felled by 2008 because of their poor condition.

Standards supplied in the West today as U. pumila 'Pendula' appear to be a more symmetrical and neatly shaped clone than Meyer's. A specimen stands (2025) near the Royal Observatory, Greenwich.

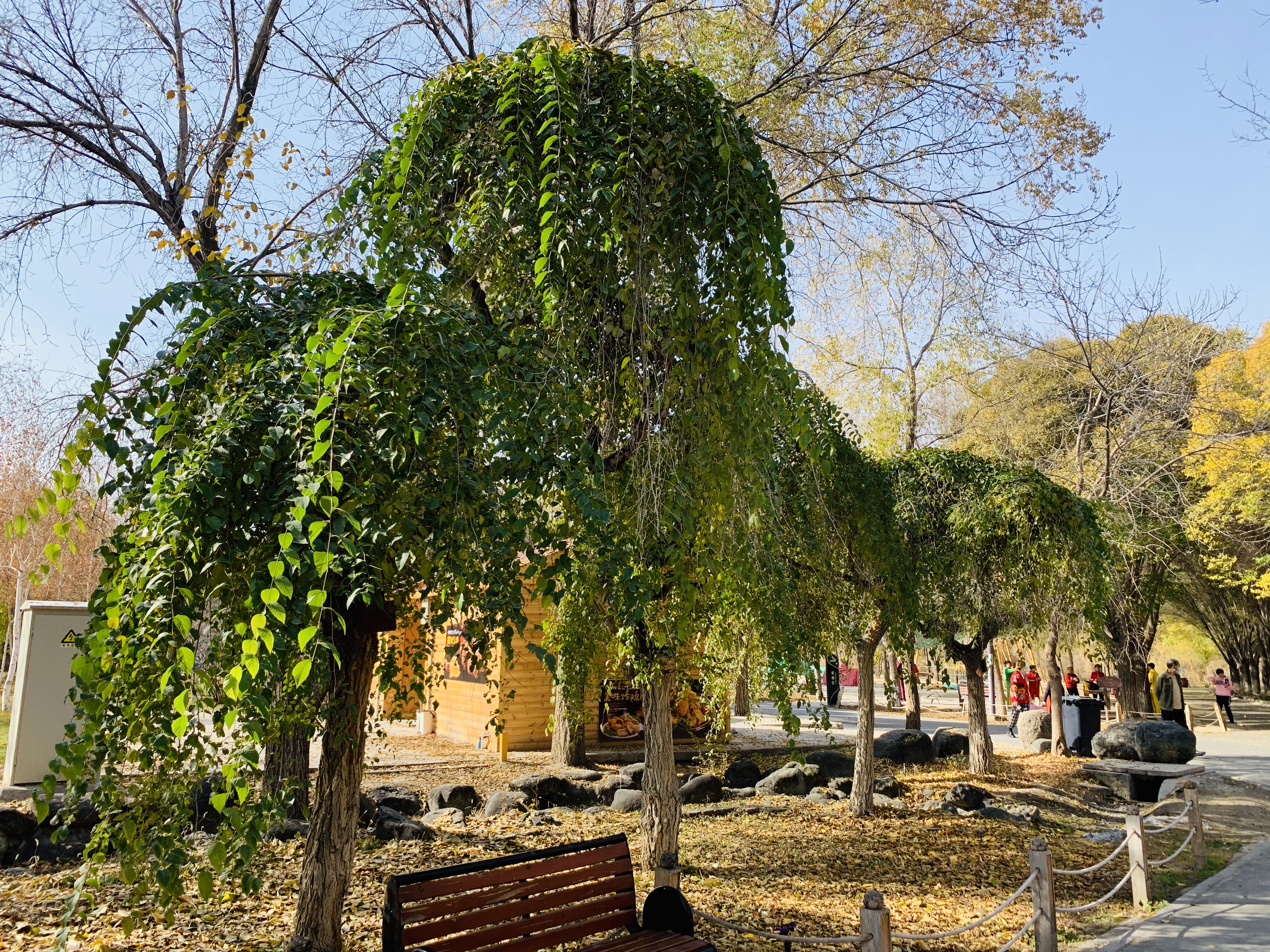
Ulmus pumila 'Pendula' in Urumqi Botanical Garden, Xinjiang, China

== 'Pendula'-like cultivars ==
In the mid 20th century, Belmonte Arboretum Wageningen had an elm labelled U. pumila 'Pendula'. By 1962 it had been relabelled "Siberian elm cultivar, formerly registered as U. pumila 'Pendula' ", suggesting doubts about the identification. Old examples of what appears to be the same cultivar, with Belmonte-type leaves, survive in Edinburgh (2025). The largest (height 12 m, girth over 2 m), was planted on the Granton Road railway station cutting, and now overlooks Ferry Road Path, between 7 and 9 Rosebank Rd. There are trees of the same type opposite, on the other side of the former station. Two others stand at the intersection of Royal Crescent and Dundonald St and at 47 York Rd (formerly Trinity railway station). The USDA (1916) recommended the cultivar for planting on bank tops, where its silhouette could best be appreciated; most of the Edinburgh specimens have been planted in such locations. (A 1940 herbarium specimen labelled U. pumila 'Pendula' from Zuiderpark, The Hague, is similar to the Wageningen and Edinburgh leaves.) Since their tangled and pendulous branching resembles Meyer's 1908 photograph of a mature specimen in Fengtai, they may be the cultivar Meyer introduced to the West as U. pumila 'Pendula', though neither fruit nor leaf is typical of U. pumila.

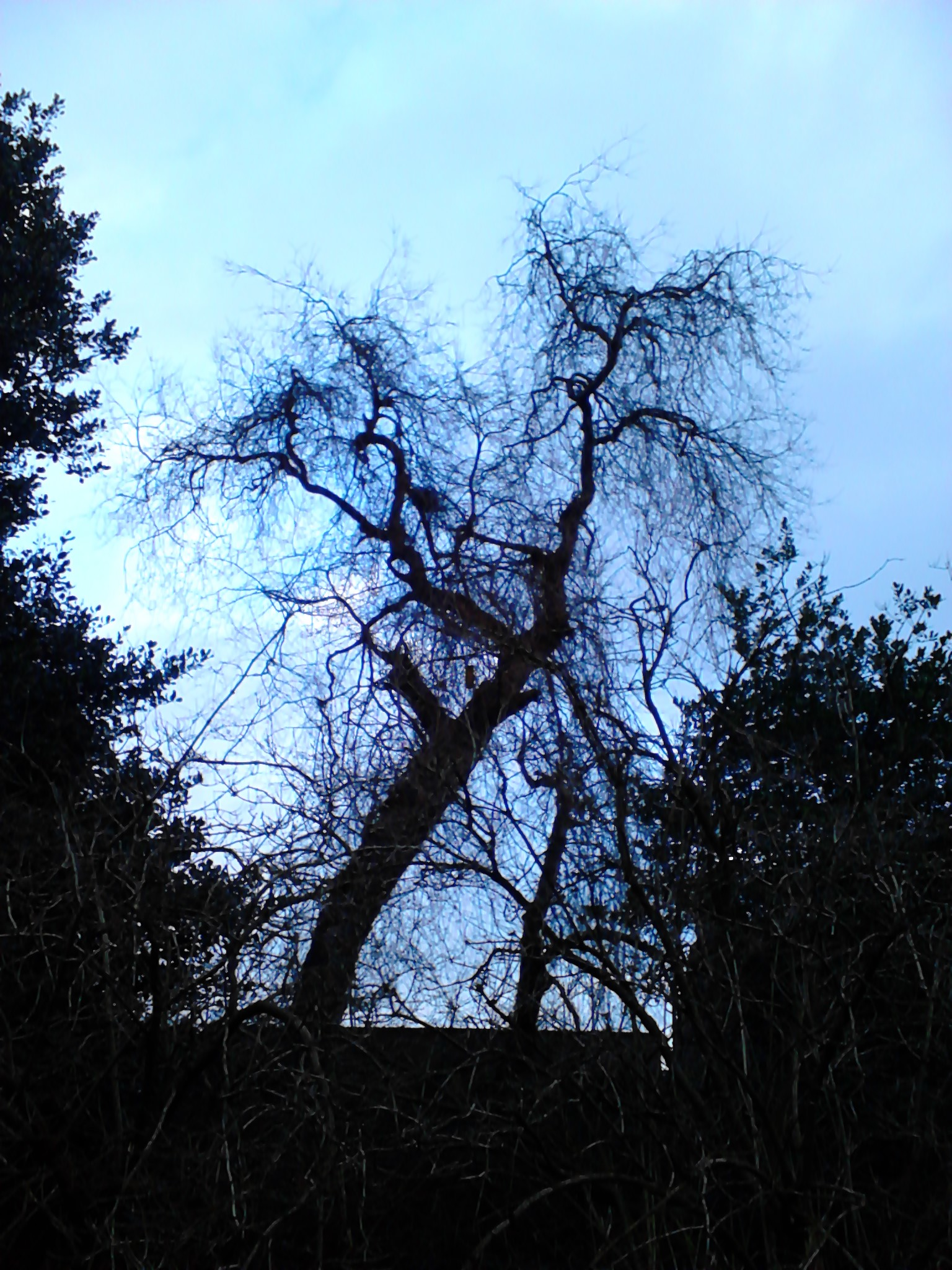
Ferry Road Path elm (Rosebank Road), Edinburgh, after loss of long lateral branch (2016)

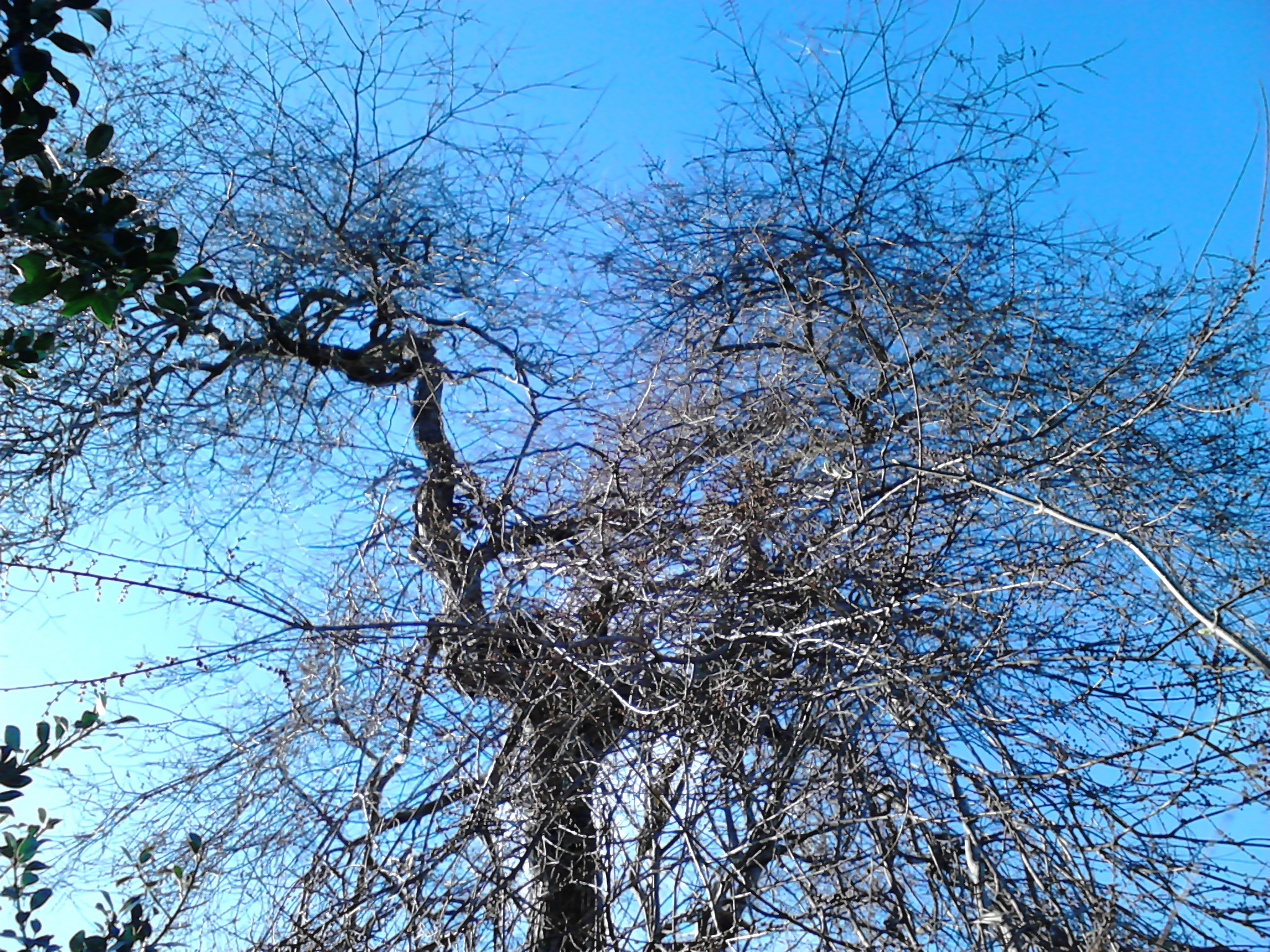
Tangled branch-ends of same

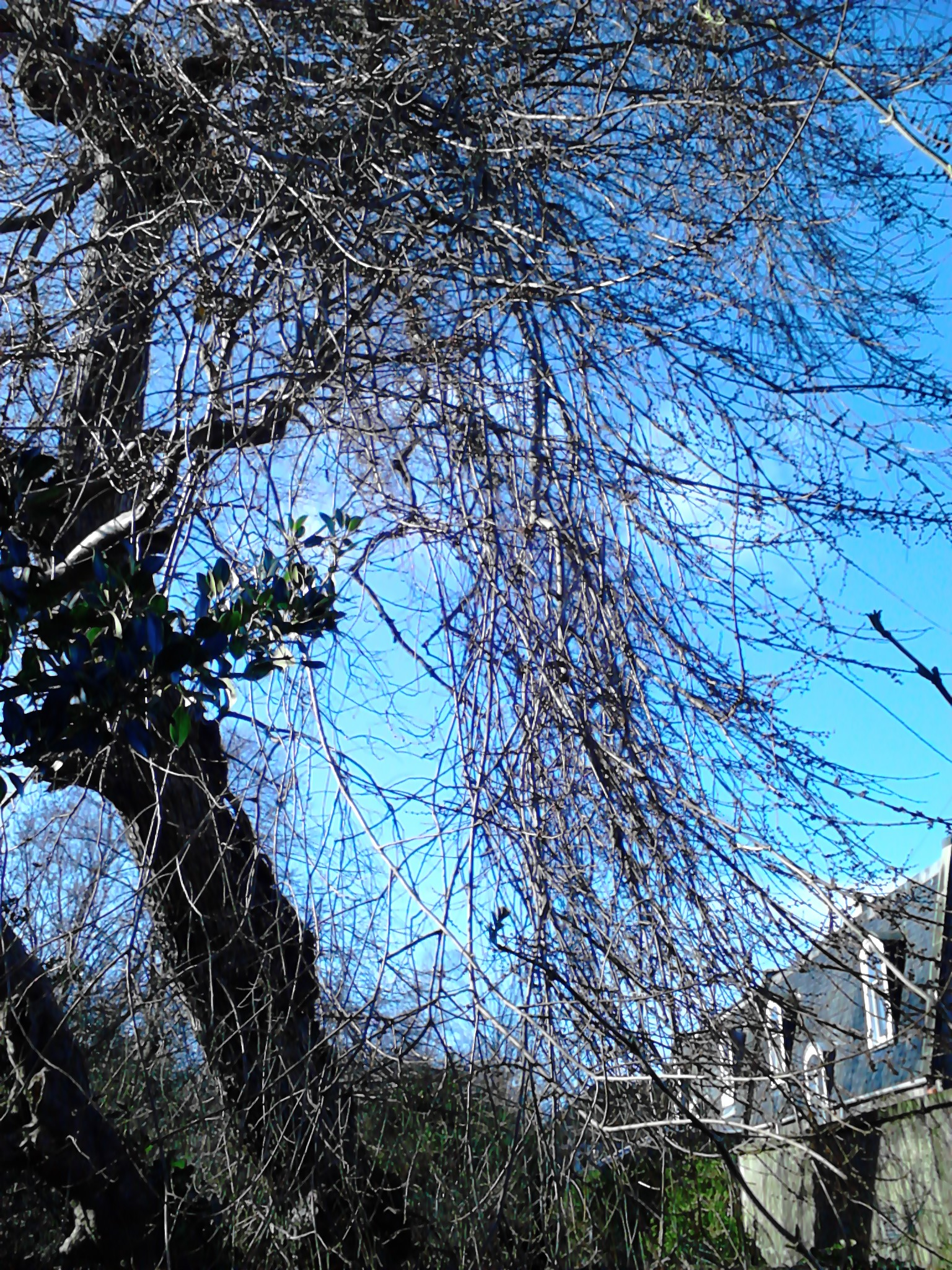
Pendulous shoots of same

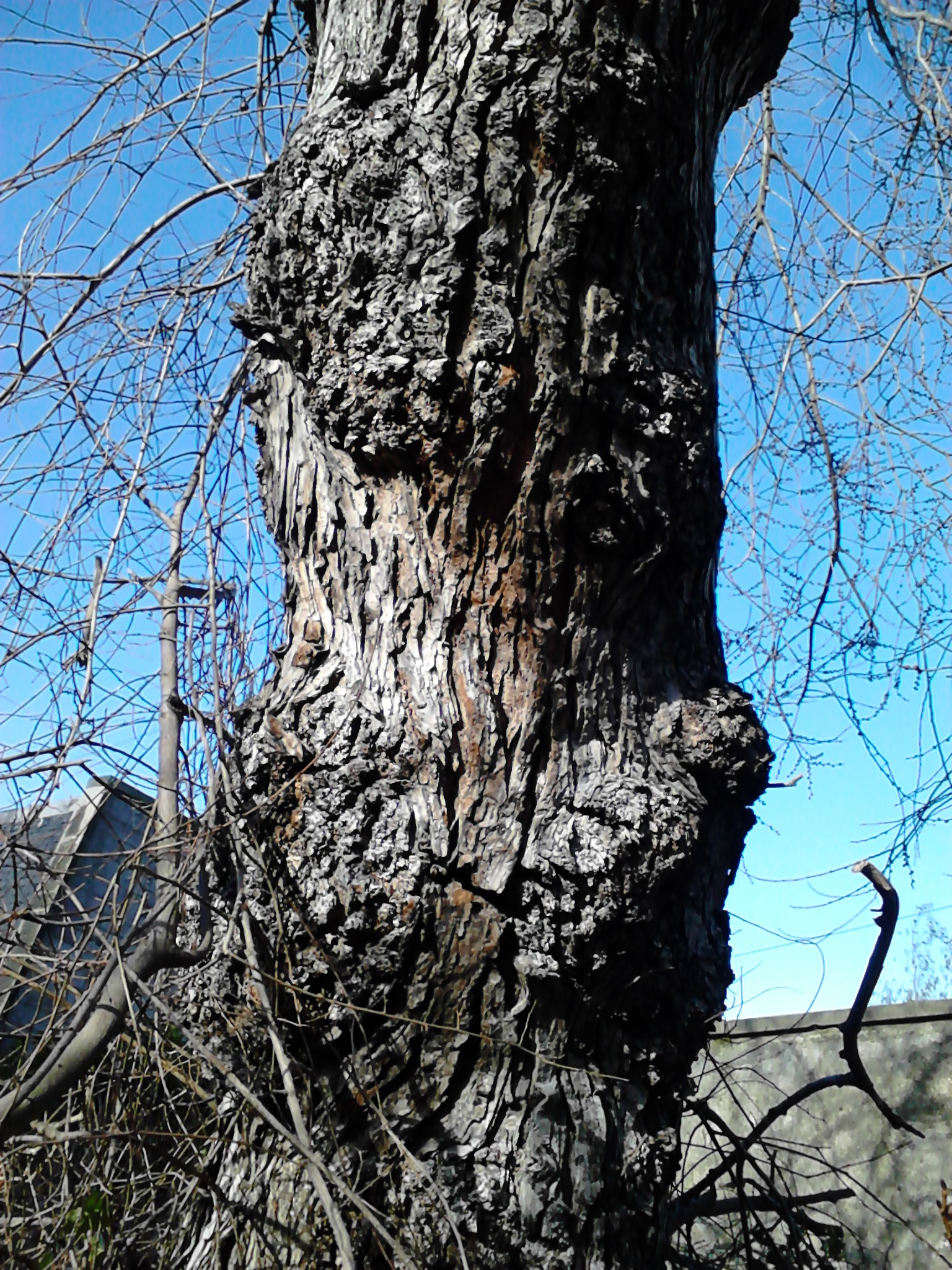
Bark of same

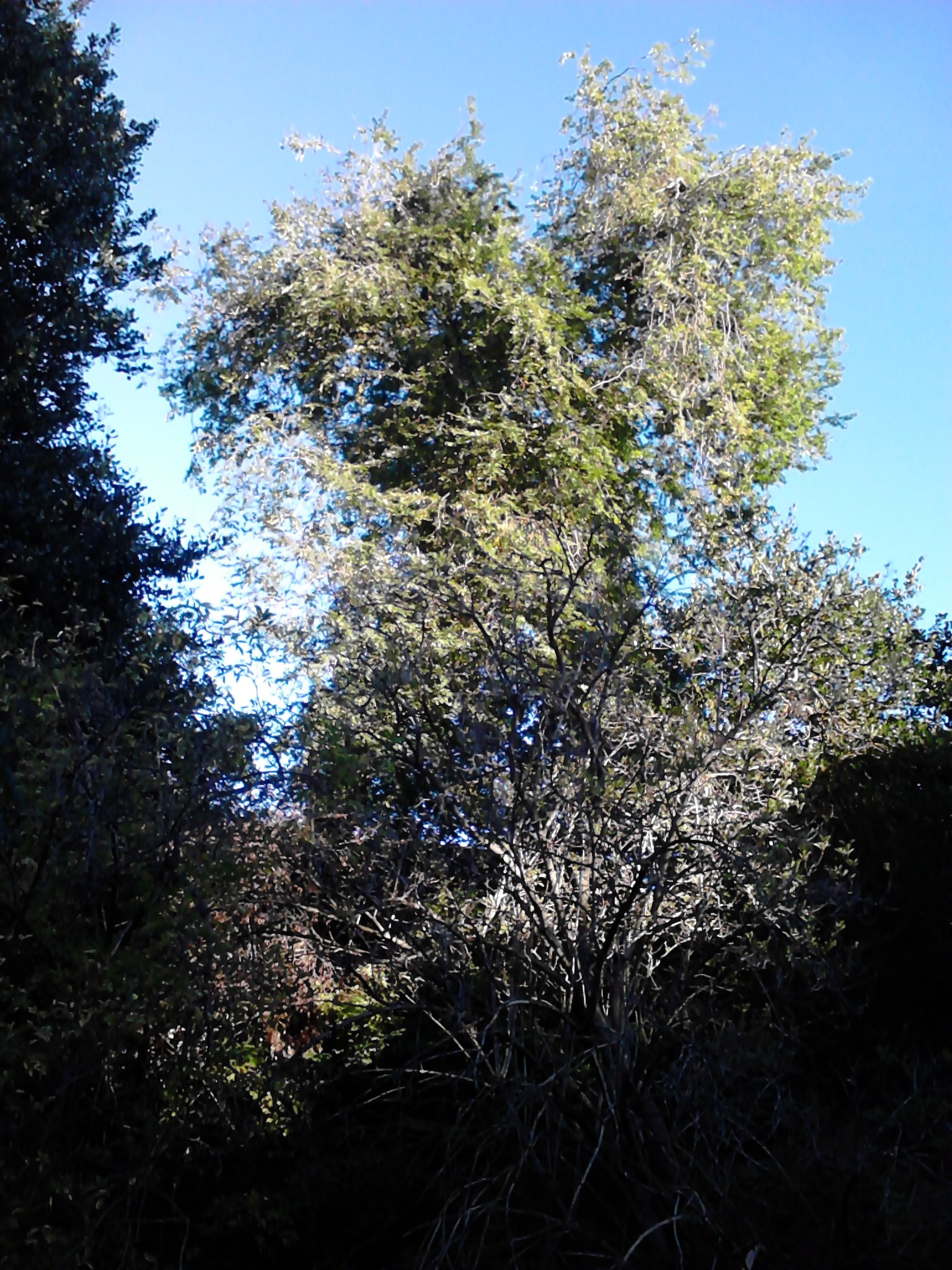
Same, summer, after loss of long lateral branch (2017)
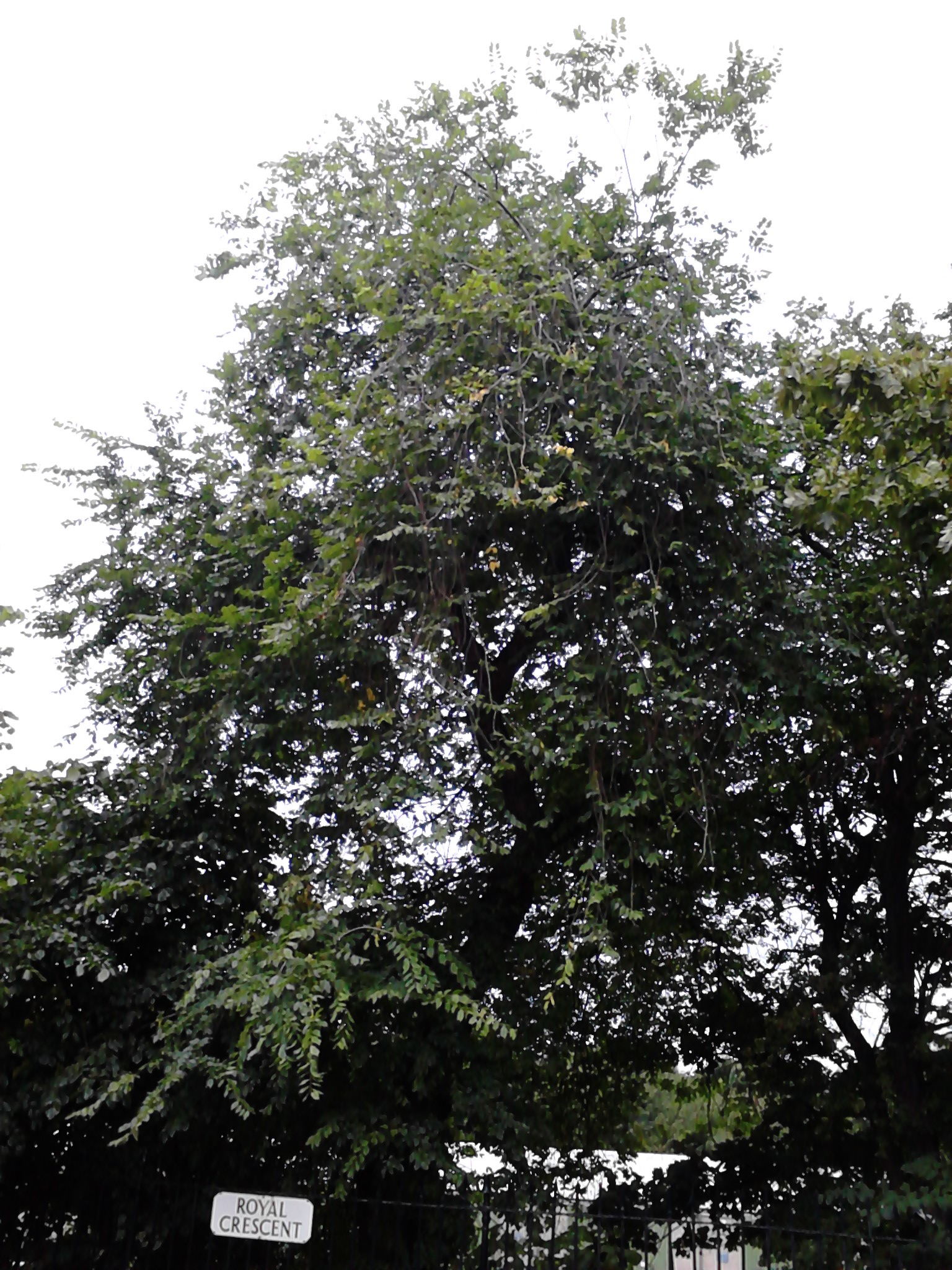
Same cultivar, Royal Crescent, Edinburgh (2016)

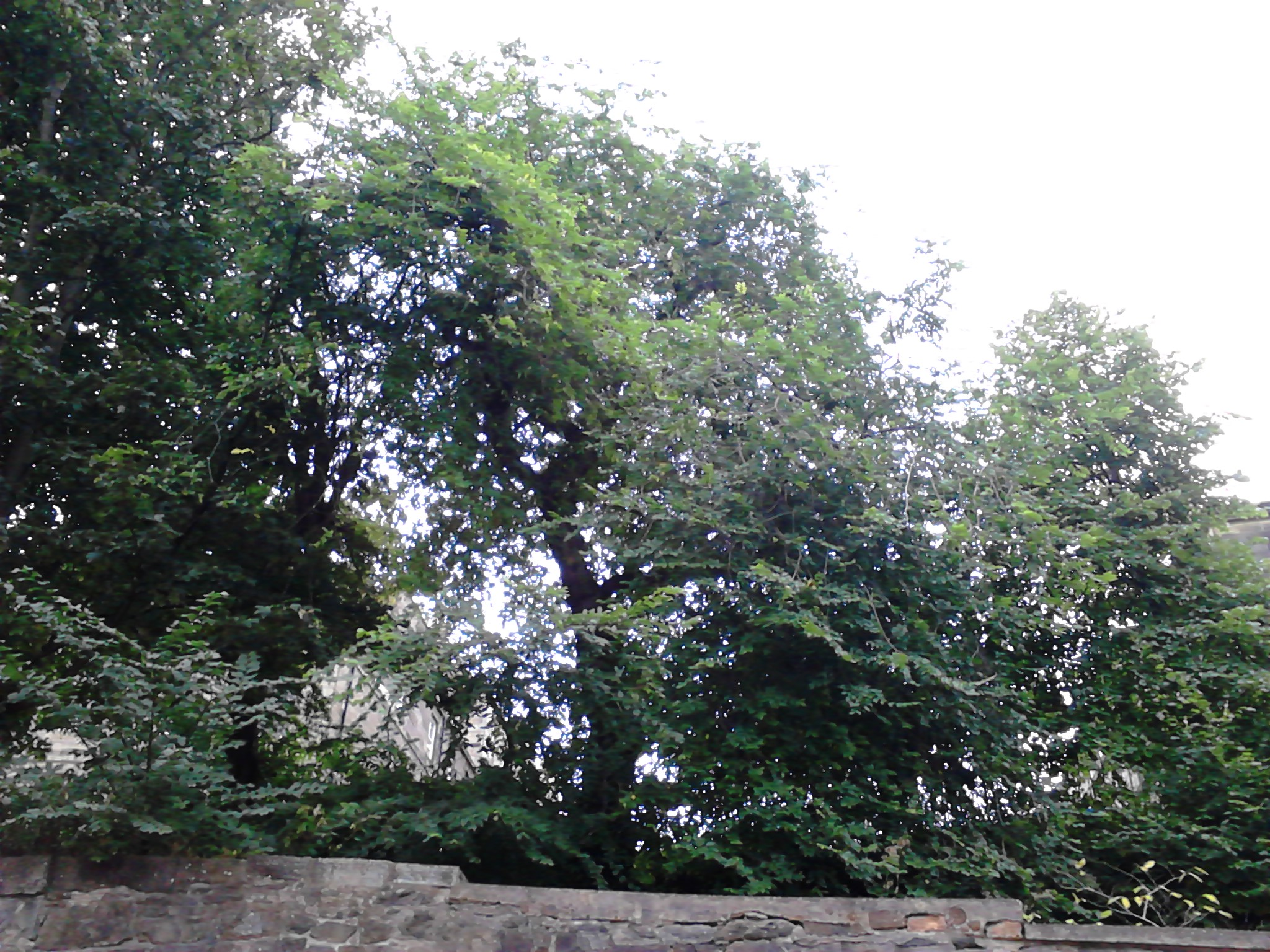
Same tree

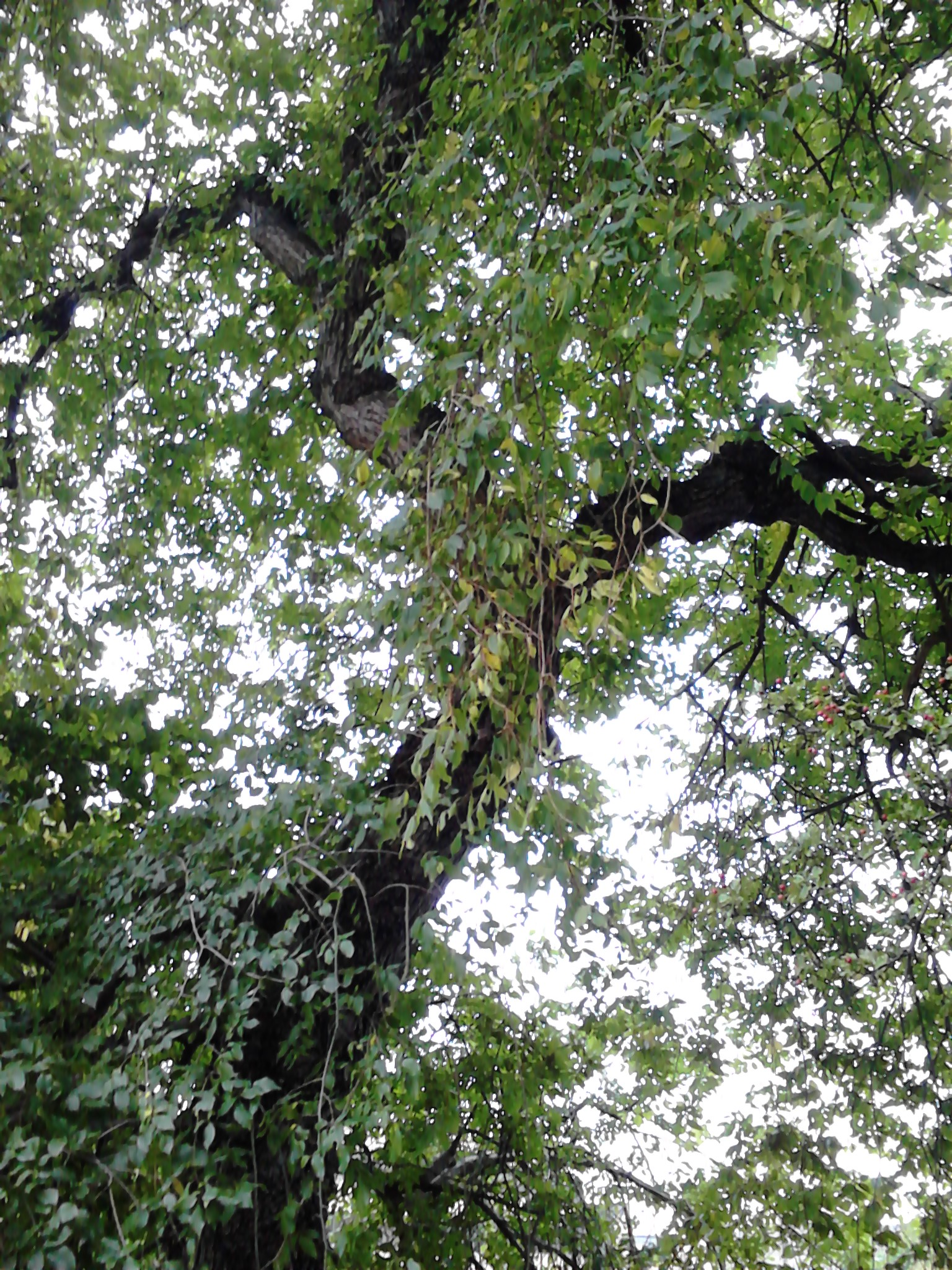
Upper trunk

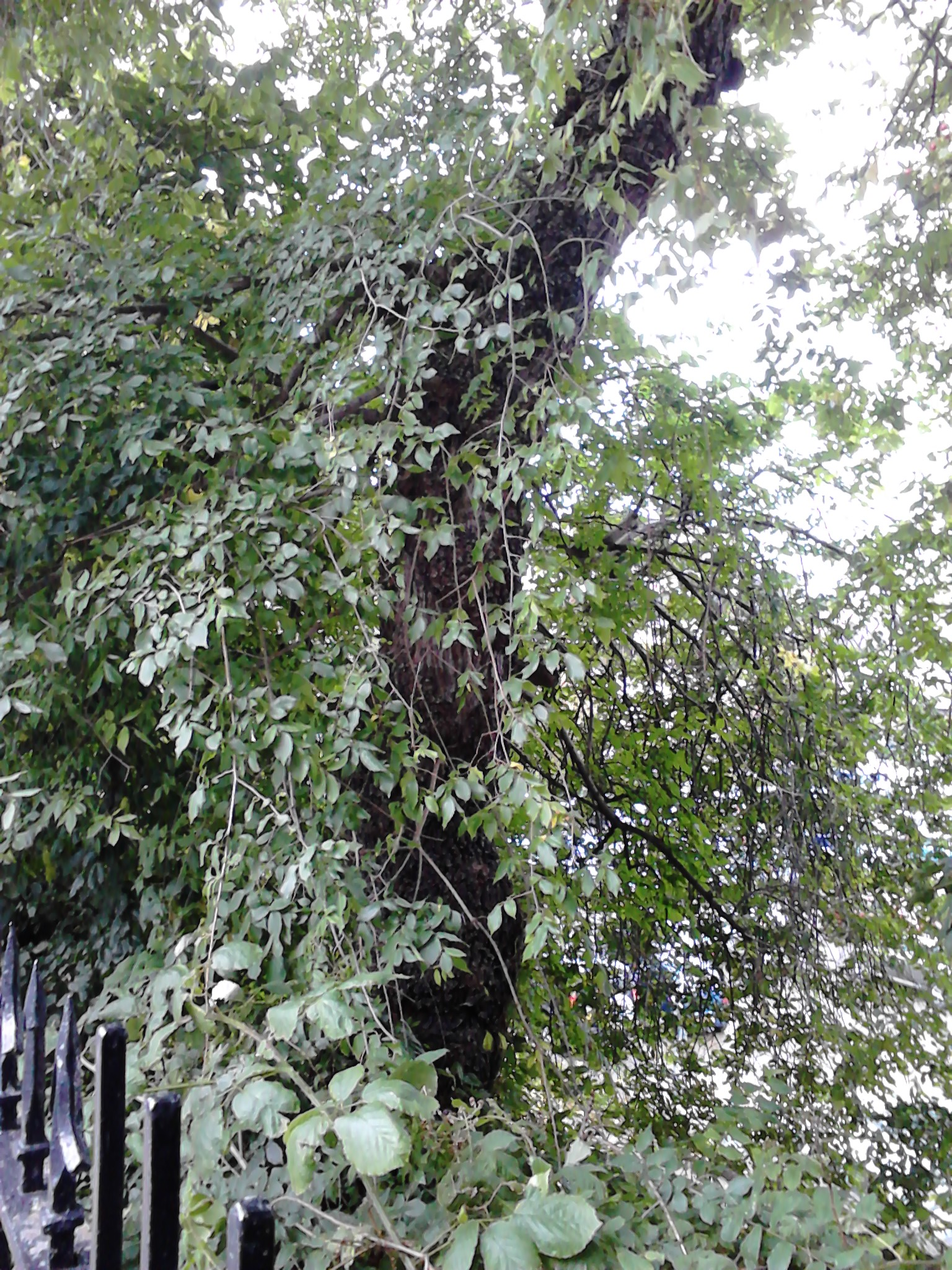
Bark and foliage

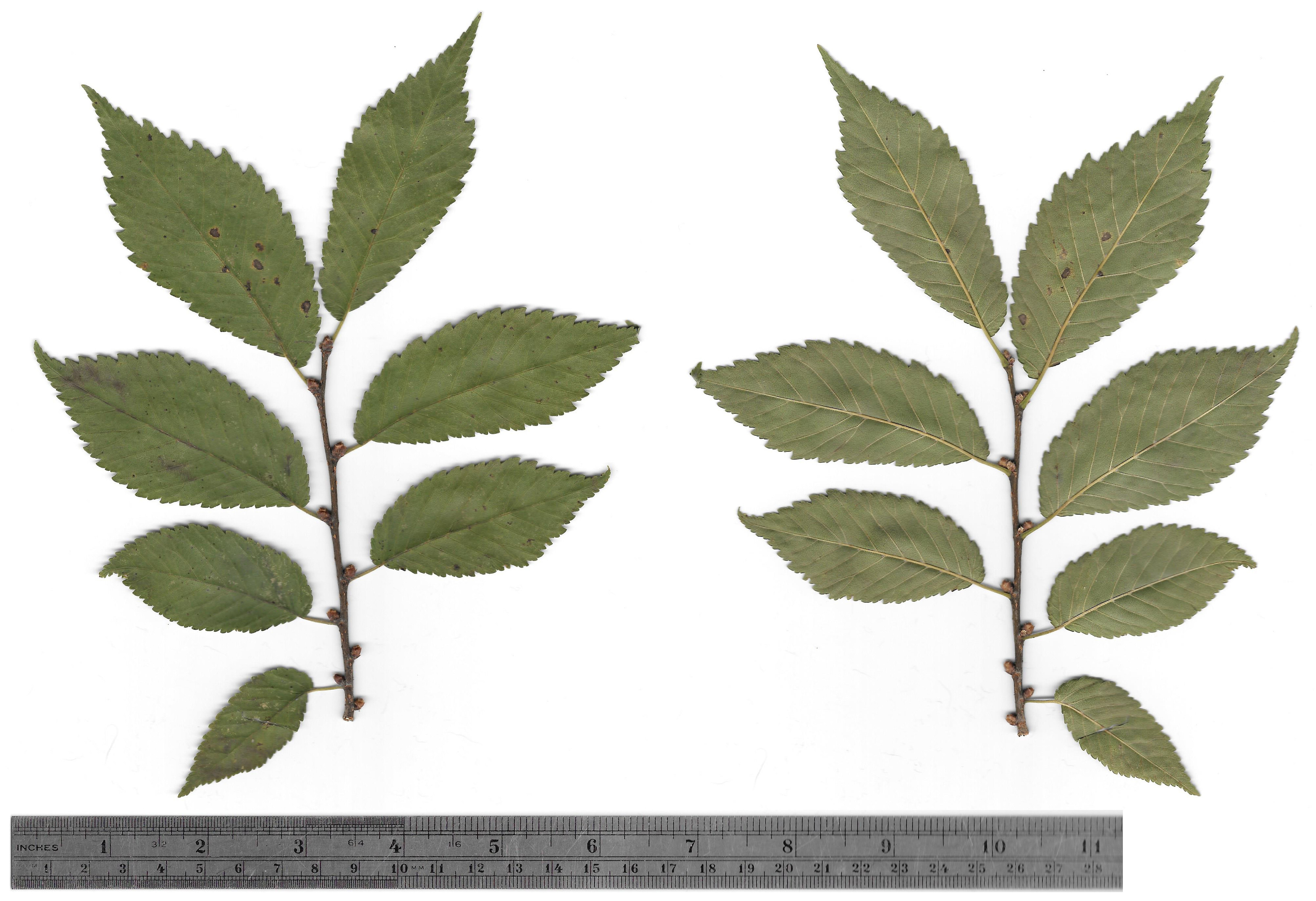
Pressed leaves, August

== Accessions ==
Europe

- Grange Farm Arboretum, Lincolnshire, UK. Acc. no. 1143.

== Synonymy ==
- Ulmus campestris (: minor) pendula.
- Ulmus sibirica Hort..
- Ulmus pumila Linn. cv. 'Pendula' Kirchner.

== Nurseries ==
=== Europe ===
- Plantenmarkt Boskoop, 3755 MX Eemnes, Netherlands
