= Balerno railway station =

Disused railway station in Balerno, Edinburgh

Coordinates: 55.8893°N 3.3365°W

Balerno
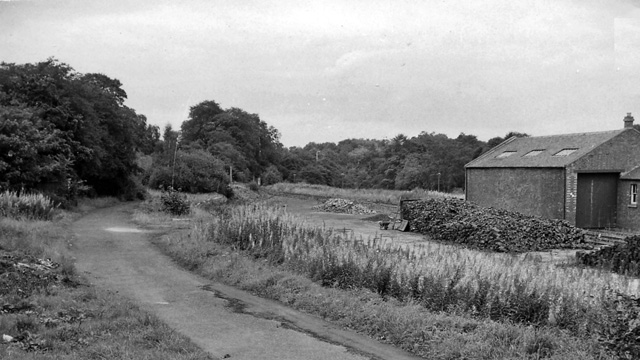
- The site of Balerno Goods station in 1962 with the old goods shed

General information
- Location: Edinburgh; Scotland
- Grid reference: NT163670
- Platforms: 1

Other information
- Status: Disused

History
- Original company: Caledonian Railway
- Pre-grouping: Caledonian Railway
- Post-grouping: London Midland and Scottish Railway

Key dates
- 1 August 1874: Station opens
- 1 November 1943 (Last train): Station closes (LMS Last train)
- 1 June 1949: Station closes (BR Officially)
- 4 December 1967: Line closes to goods traffic
Location

Balerno railway station was opened in 1874 and served the area of the village of Balerno that now forms part of the city of Edinburgh. Although primarily built as a goods line, with a dedicated goods station at Balerno, serving the many mills on the Water of Leith, a passenger service was provided by the Caledonian Railway using the Balerno Loop and after grouping by the London, Midland and Scottish Railway, seeing formal closure to passenger traffic shortly after nationalisation. The station was the only one with a separately served goods station on the 'loop' line and lay in rural surroundings that had been popular with families having a day out in the country.

== History ==
Opened by the Caledonian Railway, it became part of the London Midland and Scottish Railway during the Grouping of 1923, and the LMS ran the last train to serve the station in 1943 with the expectation that the line would re-open after the war. The line passed to the Scottish Region of British Railways upon nationalisation in 1948 who then officially closed Balerno in 1949. The line had many tight curves and the low line speeds made it vulnerable to competition from road transport.

== Infrastructure ==
=== Passenger station ===
The station had a stationmaster's house, ticket office, waiting room, etc and was located on the western side of the line with a typical Caledonian Railway style small wooden station building with a short canopy. The station had a single platform and at first stood on a single track section, however later a passing loop was added. The stationmaster's house survives as a private dwelling. A signalbox was located on the south side of the road bridge close to Balerno Goods Junction. The Balerno Loop line joined the Shotts Line to the west at Ravelrig Junction, near where Ravelrig Junction Platform station stood from 1884 until 1920.

=== Balerno goods station ===
The OS map of 1893 shows the goods station (NT163668) with its signal box near Balerno Goods Junction standing to the south-west of the passenger station with several sidings, a crane, small associated buildings and a large goods shed. The goods station was closer to the village than the passenger station. The track layout and buildings show several changes over the years. The site is now occupied by a school.

Preceding station	Historical railways	Following station
Currie	Caledonian Railway; Balerno Loop	Ravelrig Junction Platform
