= Leith North railway station =

Disused railway station in Leith, Edinburgh

Leith North
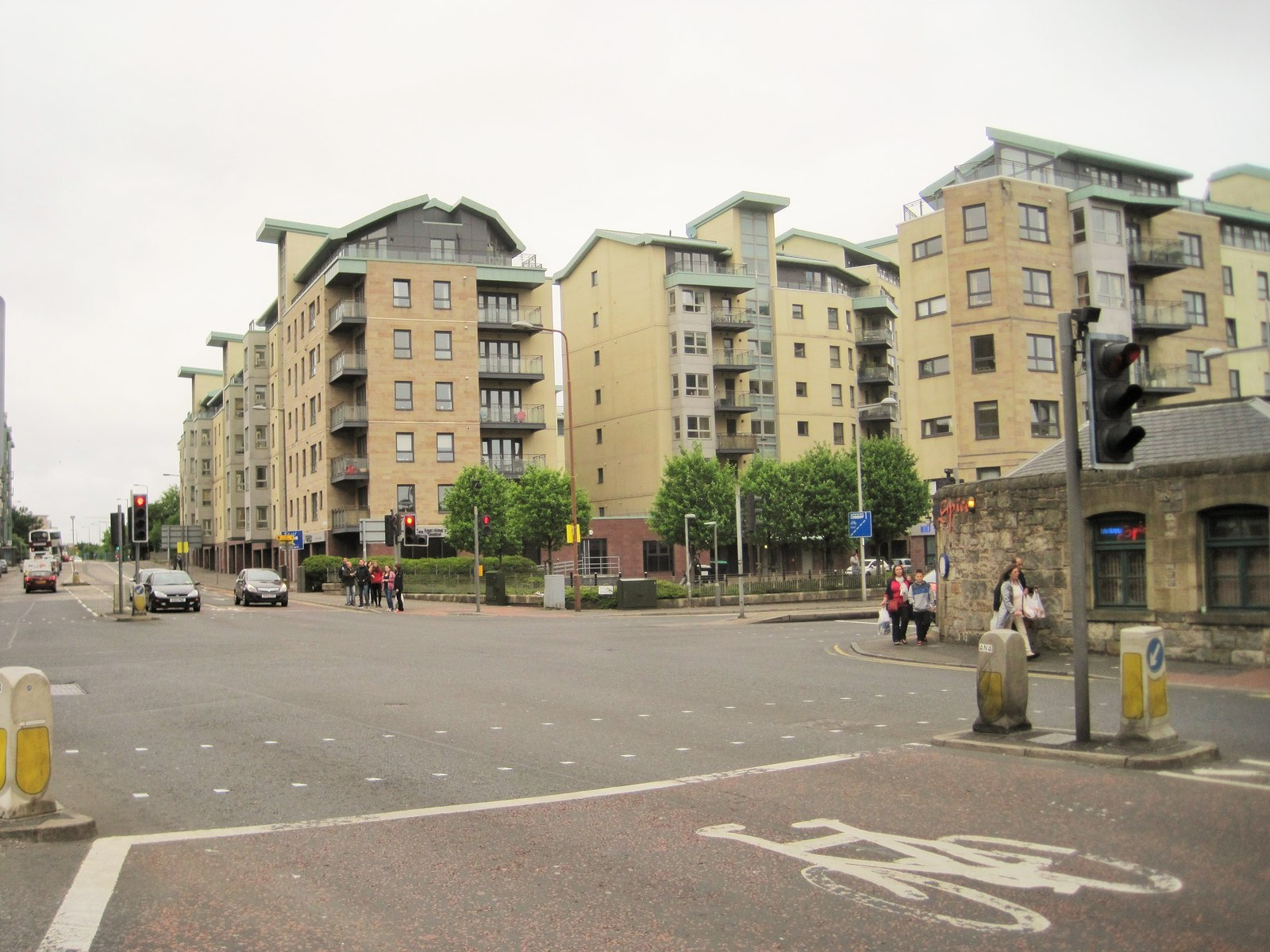
- The site of the station in 2015

General information
- Location: Leith, Edinburgh; Scotland
- Coordinates: 55.9784°N 3.1807°W
- Grid reference: NT264767
- Platforms: 1

Other information
- Status: Disused

History
- Original company: Caledonian Railway
- Pre-grouping: Caledonian Railway
- Post-grouping: London, Midland and Scottish Railway; British Railways (Scottish Region)

Key dates
- 1 August 1879: Opened as Leith
- 1 August 1903: Name changed to North Leith
- 7 April 1952: Name changed to Leith North
- 30 April 1962: Closed
Location

Leith North railway station served the area of Leith, Edinburgh, Scotland, from 1879 to 1962 on the Leith North Passenger Branch.

== History ==
The station was opened as Leith on 1 August 1879 by the Caledonian Railway. Beyond the buffer stops was a train shed, to the west was a siding and on the south side of the line was the signal box, which was named 'Leith Passenger' when the station opened. The station's name was changed to North Leith on 1 August 1903 and changed again to Leith North on 7 April 1952. It closed on 30 April 1962.

Preceding station	Disused railways	Following station
Newhaven; Line and station closed	Caledonian Railway; Leith North Passenger Branch	Terminus
