= Caledonian Railway lines to Edinburgh =

Railway network around Edinburgh, Scotland (UK)

The Caledonian Railway lines to Edinburgh started with the main line that reached Edinburgh in 1848 as part of its route connecting the city with Glasgow and Carlisle. The potential of the docks at Granton and Leith led to branch line extensions, and residential development encouraged branch lines in what became the suburbs of Edinburgh. In 1869 a line was opened from Carfin through Shotts giving the Caledonian a shorter route between Glasgow and Edinburgh.

In the twentieth century the industrial decline of the areas served resulted in closures. However the main line from Carstairs and the Glasgow route through Shotts have increased their passenger services considerably, and some reopenings of stations have taken place.

== History ==
=== First main line to Edinburgh ===
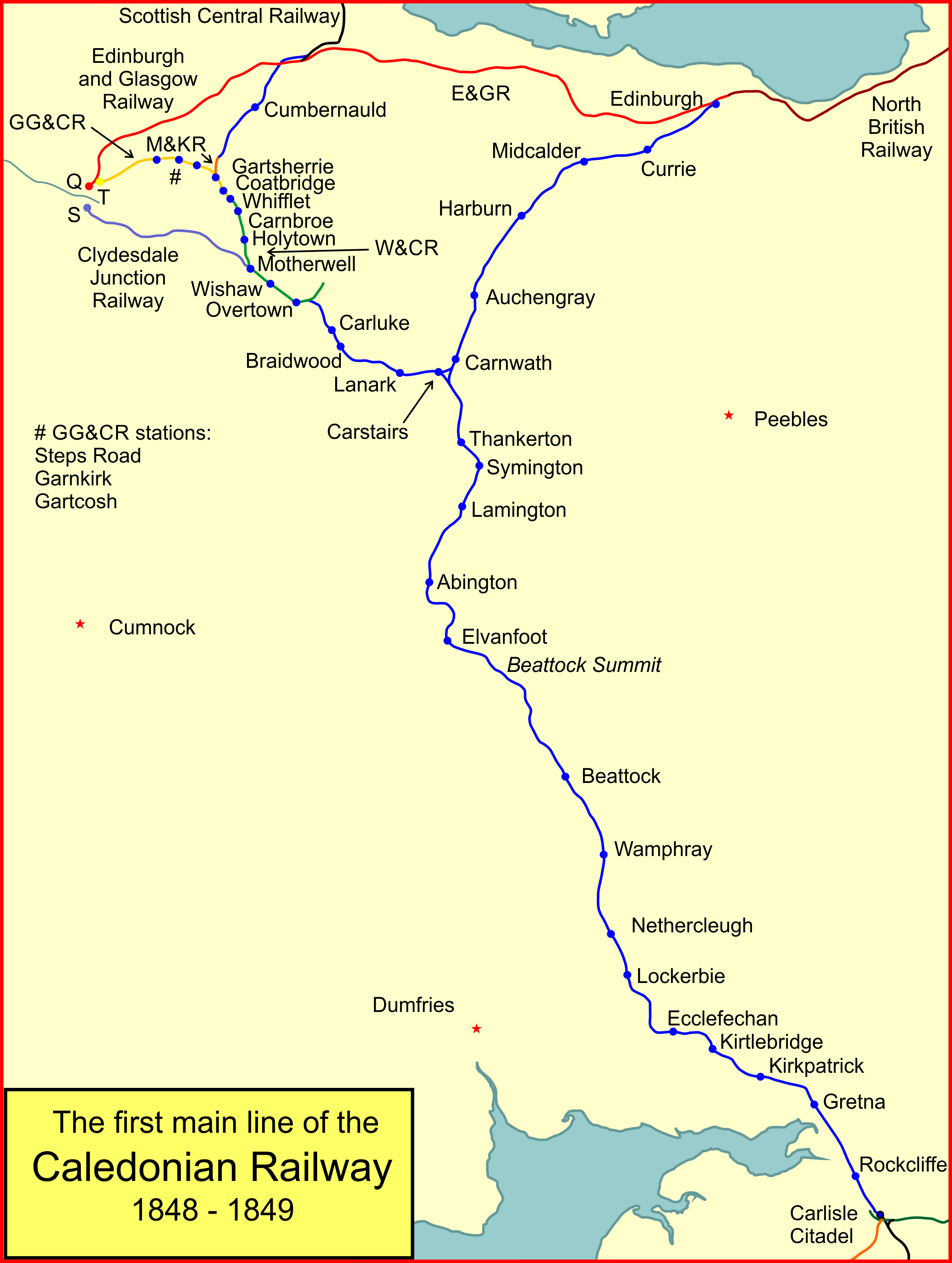
The first Caledonian Railway main line

The Caledonian Railway entered Edinburgh on 15 February 1848 when it opened its Edinburgh line from Carstairs to a terminus at Lothian Road. A locomotive depot was established at Dalry Road. This completed the first continuous railway line between Edinburgh and England; trains from Edinburgh combined with trains from Glasgow at Carstairs, and ran to London in combination. The rival North British Railway had already opened southwards from Edinburgh but for the time being passengers had to change at Berwick-upon-Tweed to cross the River Tweed on foot. The Caledonian Railway also ran trains between Edinburgh and Glasgow, competing with the more direct Edinburgh and Glasgow Railway, and a period of ruinous competition began.

=== Improving the Edinburgh terminal ===
The first Edinburgh terminal may have been satisfactory when first designed at Lothian Road, but in practical use it was clearly inadequate for the important city: it had a single platform which served both arrivals and departures, and a two-road goods shed with a single loading platform. During 1865, the Caledonian was considering how to improve it, and the company considered making arrangements with the North British Railway to use Waverley station. The Burgh Council of Edinburgh was anxious that there should be a single main station in the city. However the North British was hostile in principle, and the idea came to nothing.

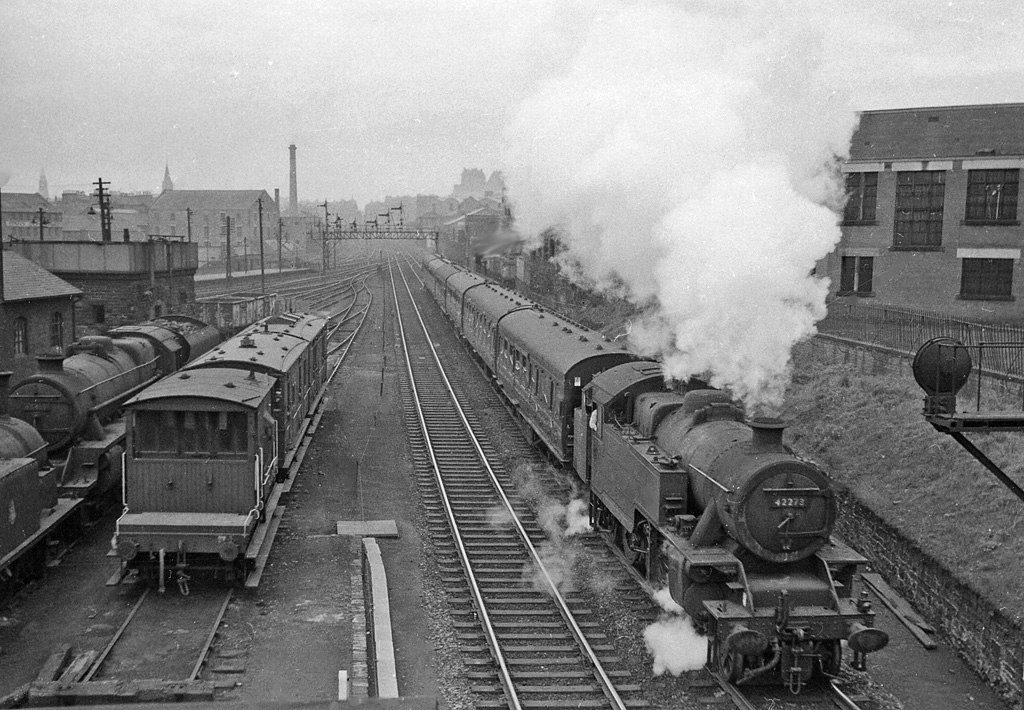
An empty stock train for Princes Street Station, passing Dalry Road Locomotive Depot in 1962

Major extension was obviously essential, and on 2 May 1870 a new temporary station was opened adjacent to, and to the north of Lothian Road; it was named Princes Street. It was a wooden structure; the Caledonian was short of cash at this time and a more imposing terminal was not affordable. The passenger part of the station now had two platforms.

During 1890 the wooden terminus building at Princes Street was partly dismantled in preparation for improvement, when on 16 June a fire broke out, substantially destroying much of the buildings. The new, spacious station accommodation was progressively brought into use in 1893 and 1894; it had nine platforms, and had cost over £250,000. Powers were obtained for building an adjacent hotel, but it was not opened, as the Caledonian Hotel, until December 1903.

=== Haymarket, Barnton, and Granton and Leith Docks ===
Caledonian Railway (Edinburgh Station and Branches) Act 1847
- Act of Parliament
- Parliament of the United Kingdom
- Long title: An Act to enable the Caledonian Railway Company to extend their Station in Edinburgh, and to make Branch Railways to Granton and to the Edinburgh and Glasgow Railway.
- Citation: 10 & 11 Vict. c. ccxxxvii

Dates
- Royal assent: 22 July 1847

Text of statute as originally enacted

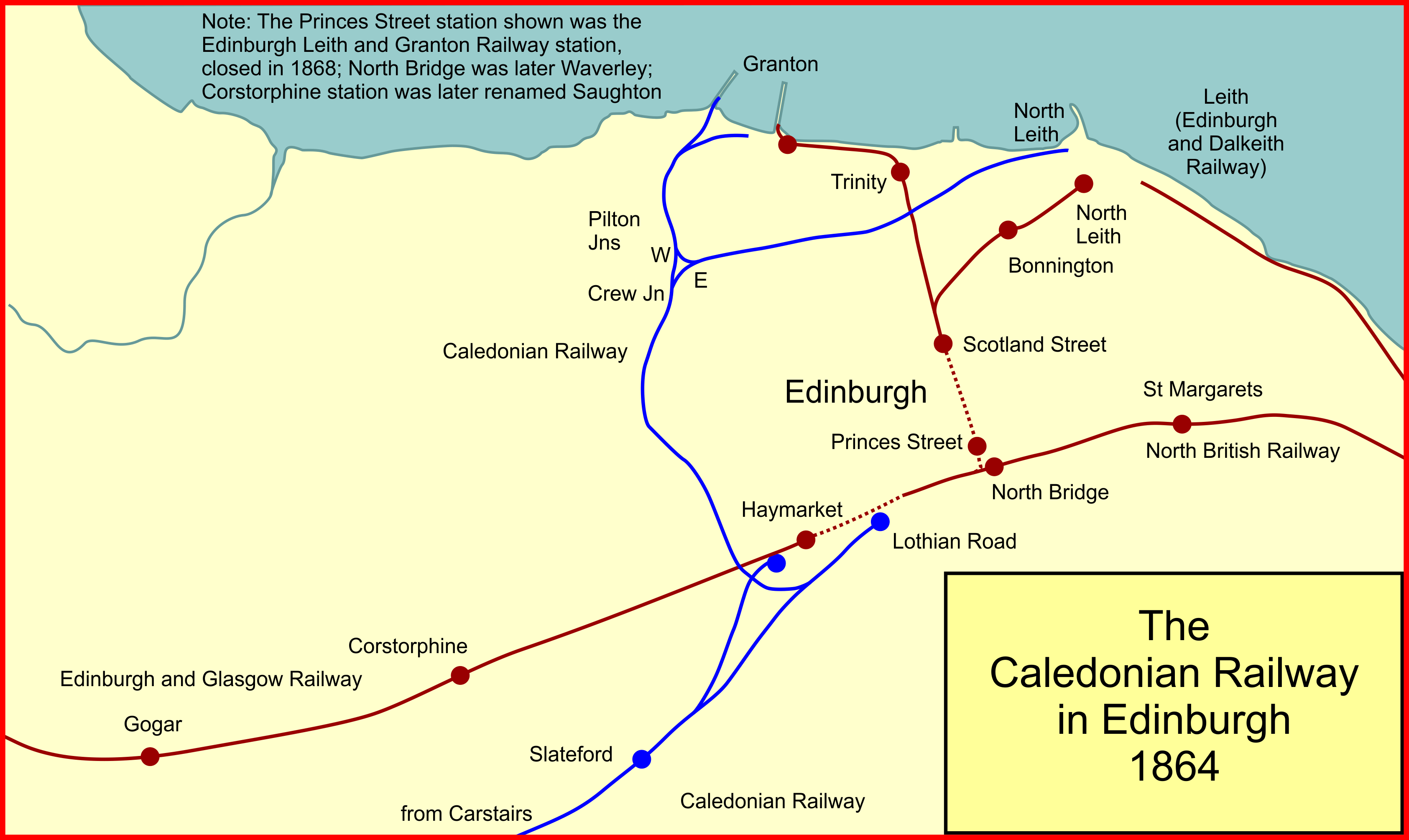
Caledonian lines in Edinburgh in 1864

The approach to the Caledonian's terminal in Edinburgh was not far from the Edinburgh and Glasgow Railway (E&GR) line. In 1847 the Caledonian obtained authorisation in the Caledonian Railway (Edinburgh Station and Branches) Act 1847 (10 & 11 Vict. c. ccxxxvii) to build a connecting line, from a junction near Slateford to Haymarket. This was not welcomed by the E&GR, and the hoped-for through running was not agreed to. In 1853 the line opened, but only to a bay platform alongside the E&GR line but some distance short of the E&GR Haymarket station; there was a backshunt connection to the E&GR line. Any passenger access would have been inconvenient and this line was not used by passenger trains; there were factory premises on the line and serving these was the primary use.

A Branch Railway from the Branch Railway above described near Tyne Castle Toll Bar in the Parish of St. Cuthbert to the Edinburgh and Glasgow Railway at or near the Haymarket Station in Edinburgh of the said Railway. — Section 5, Caledonian Railway (Edinburgh Station and Branches) Act 1847 (10 & 11 Vict. c. ccxxxvii)

The Duke of Buccleuch owned and operated docks at Granton, on the north-west extremity of Edinburgh; the principal traffic was coastal shipping, as well as ferries to Fife ports. The North British Railway served his docks, and he was anxious to have a connection from the Caledonian Railway. The Caledonian proposed a line from the Haymarket branch, diverging at Granton Junction and forking at Granton itself, serving both the west breakwater there and the main Granton Pier; Buccleuch contributed half of the construction cost. The line opened on 28 August 1861. Buccleuch's docks had extensive internal sidings, and the Caledonian and NBR lines did not directly connect; nonetheless Granton was extensively used for wagon exchange, which took place over part of the Granton Dock system. In 1863 the Caledonian Railway bought out Buccleuch's share of the line.

There was a gas works at Granton and it had a passenger station, the Granton Gasworks railway station, for the use of gas works employees only; a passenger service was provided by the Caledonian to and from Princes Street. It opened in 1902 and closed in 1942.

Granton Dock was important, but the docks at Leith, further east, were considerably more important, and the Caledonian reached them by an eastward branch from the Granton line, passing round the north of the Edinburgh conurbation. It opened on 1 September 1864, running from a triangular junction at Crew. (Note: Ross and Railbrit use both "Crew" and "Crewe" spellings at different places, and Paterson uses Crewe. The authoritative railway usage was Crew, as used for example in the Sectional Appendix to the Working Timetables dated 1 October 1960 issued by British Railways, Scottish Region, page 30; the local settlement is spelt this way in contemporary Ordnance Survey mapping.) A link line allowing direct running from Lothian Road goods yard to Granton was also opened, forming a short spur from Dalry Road to Coltbridge Junction.

On 30 June 1874 authorisation was obtained for a further connection in the area, a spur from Dalry Junctions towards Linlithgow, enabling through running from Larbert into the Caledonian Railway Edinburgh terminals; the Scottish Central Railway had obtained running powers from Larbert to Haymarket over the NBR line, and the connection allowed those trains to run direct. They had previously used the unsatisfactory bay platform at Haymarket. The new line was opened on 3 July 1876; the junction on the NBR line was Haymarket West Junction.

Suburban passenger services between Princes Street and North Leith (simply named Leith until 1903) commenced on 1 August 1879. The final approach to Leith docks for goods trains was always congested, and duplicate lines were constructed for passenger trains, parallel to the goods lines, for the final approach from Newhaven Junction to a new passenger terminus at North Leith.

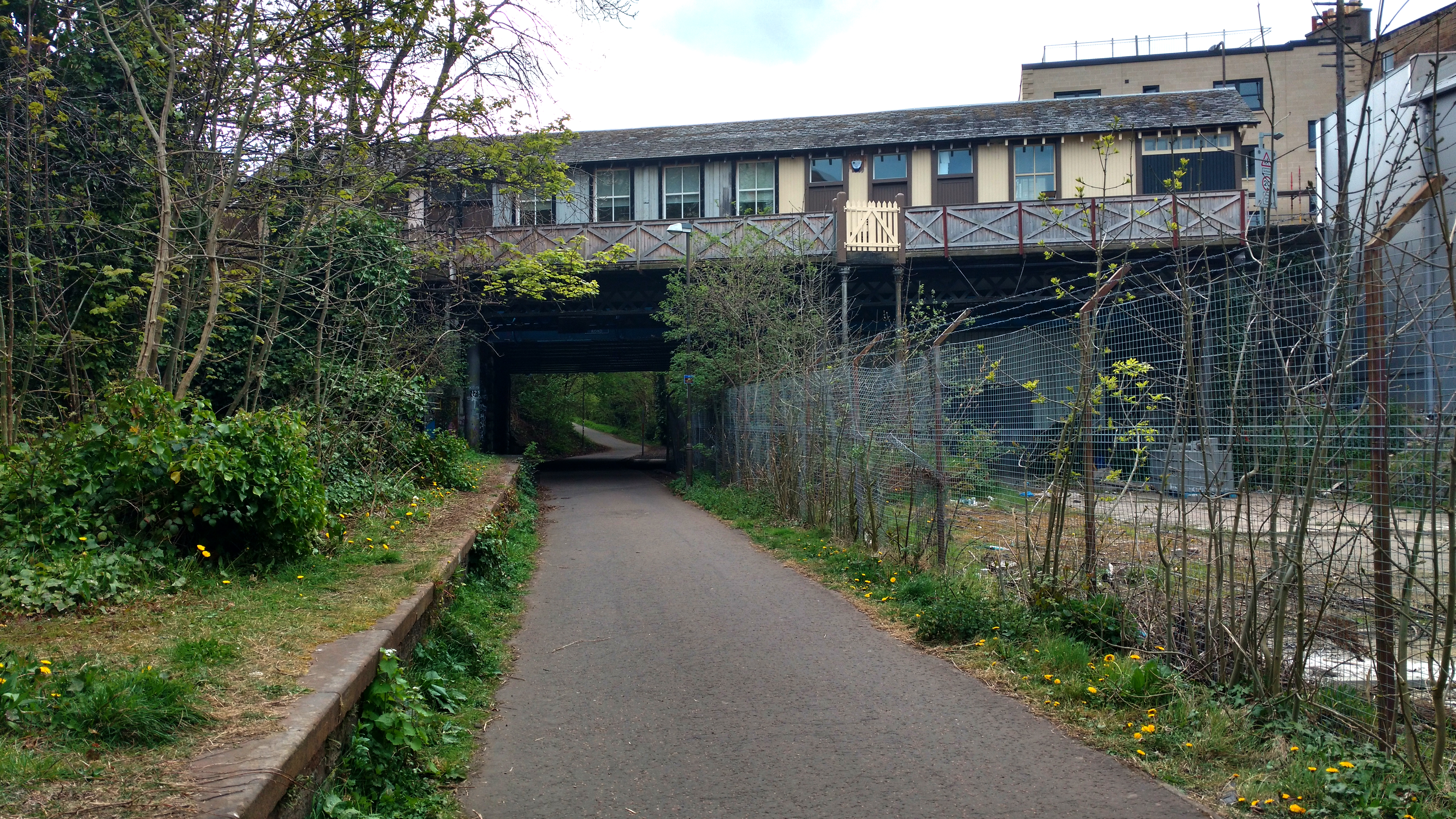
Former Newhaven station in 2017

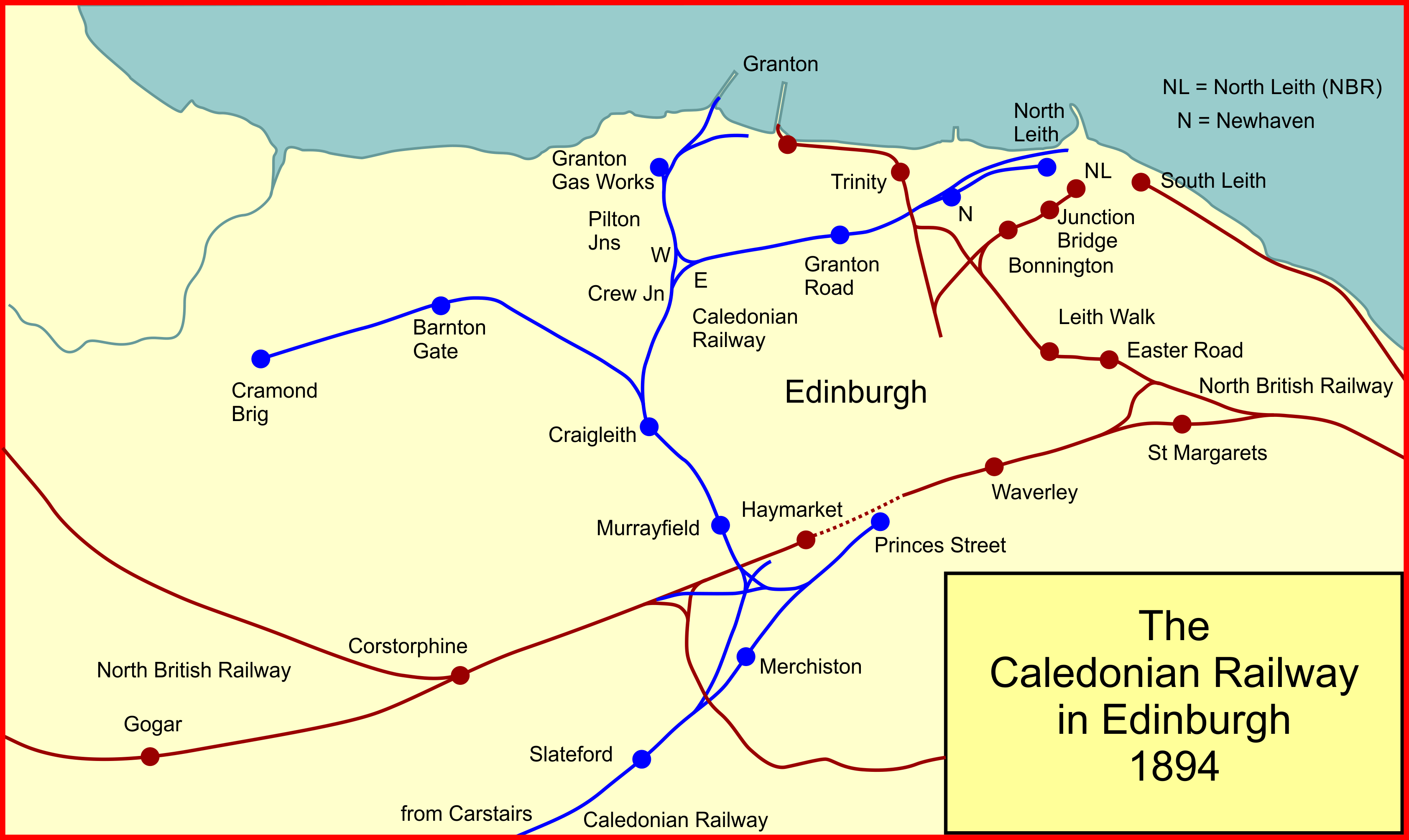
Caledonian lines in Edinburgh in 1894

The Caledonian obtained an act of Parliament, the Caledonian Railway (Additional Powers) Act 1890 (53 & 54 Vict. c. cxxxi) giving it authorisation to build a line to Cramond Brig, a rural location west of Granton, on 25 July 1890. This was a speculative branch intended to open up new residential districts, in collaboration with a property developer. The line opened as a branch from the Granton Dock line at Craigleith on 1 March 1894. Cramond Brig was renamed Barnton from 1903. So lucrative was the development of new residential areas that the Caledonian considered extending to form a loop to Corstorphine, returning to Edinburgh, but this was never achieved and it was the North British Railway that built to Corstorphine.

A railway ("Railway No. 7") two miles five furlongs one chain and eight yards or thereabouts in length to be called "the Barnton Railway" commencing by a junction with the Granton branch of the Caledonian Railway at a point thereon one hundred and thirty yards or thereabouts measuring in a northerly direction from the bridge carrying the Edinburgh and Queensferry Road over that branch and terminating at a point on the north side of that road and within Barnton Park eighty yards or thereabouts measuring in a northerly direction from the junction of the said road with the public road leading from the village of Cramond past the south entrance lodge of Braehead. — Section 5, Caledonian Railway (Additional Powers) Act 1890 (53 & 54 Vict. c. cxxxi)

The Leith harbour authorities extended the dock facilities in 1902, further east from the former location; the emphasis was on coal export.

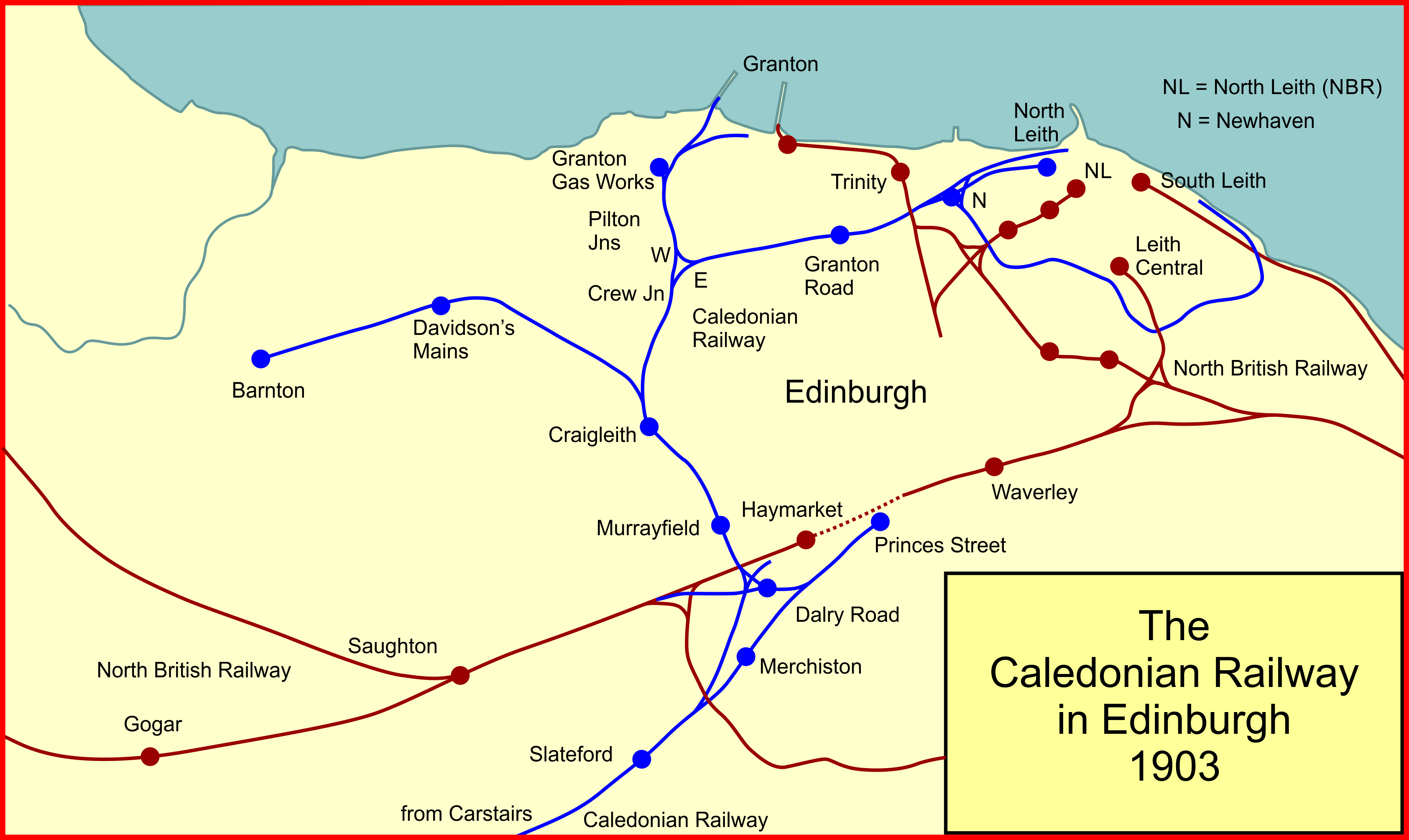
Caledonian lines in Edinburgh in 1903

The Caledonian needed to make a rail connection: it became known and the Leith New Lines. The branch diverged from the earlier North Leith branch at Newhaven Junction, and looped south and east around the edge of Leith, before turning north towards a new terminus at South Leith; there was also a spur from Seafield Junction to the eastern docks. By this time the greater conurbation had been built up, and the line was difficult and expensive to build. It opened to goods traffic on 1 August 1903. By the time the passenger accommodation was ready at stations at Newhaven, Ferry Road, Leith Walk and Seafield, street tramcars were obviously unbeatable competition for inner suburban railways, and the line was never opened to passengers.

A second phase of the project was to have been an ambitious underground line through the city centre to create a circular route for suburban passenger services. The proposal had experienced strong opposition from the City Council as there would be cut and cover tunnels through Edinburgh New Town, and as the line was principally intended for passenger operation, it was not proceeded with. Electric street trams were operating in Leith from 1905.

=== The Wilsontown and Tarbrax branches ===
The Caledonian Railway had been conceived as a simple inter-city line conveying long distance and local passengers and goods. However the iron works of the Monklands district were developing strongly, and there was a huge demand for coal and iron ore to feed the process. Early railways in the west of Scotland had been constructed to serve the mines and the iron works, but the demand for new railway connections to new and existing mines was strong in this period.

Caledonian Railway Wilsontown Branches Act 1859
- Act of Parliament
- Parliament of the United Kingdom
- Long title: An Act to enable the Caledonian Railway Company to make Branch Railways to the Wilsontown Mineral Field; and for other Purposes.
- Citation: 22 & 23 Vict. c. iii

Dates
- Royal assent: 21 July 1859

There had long been iron working at Wilsontown, and the Wilsontown, Morningside and Coltness Railway had opened in 1845 to serve the industry. Now new mineral fields were being developed in the area south of the earlier line, and the Caledonian Railway obtained authorisation in the Caledonian Railway Wilsontown Branches Act 1859 (22 & 23 Vict. c. iii) on 21 July 1859 to build a branch line from the Carstairs to Edinburgh line from a junction near Auchengray. It opened in 1860.

Shale oil was being exploited in the area at the time; this required refining to extract the oil from the solid mineral, and a works had been established at Tarbrax. The Caledonian built a short branch to the works was opened at the end of 1863 or the beginning of 1864.

Several short extensions were opened in 1869 to collieries off the Wilsontown branch, and to South Cobbinshaw Colliery off the Tarbrax branch.

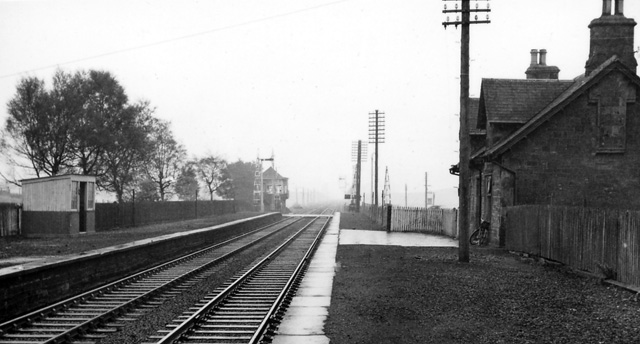
Blackford Station in 1961

=== The Midcalder Line ===
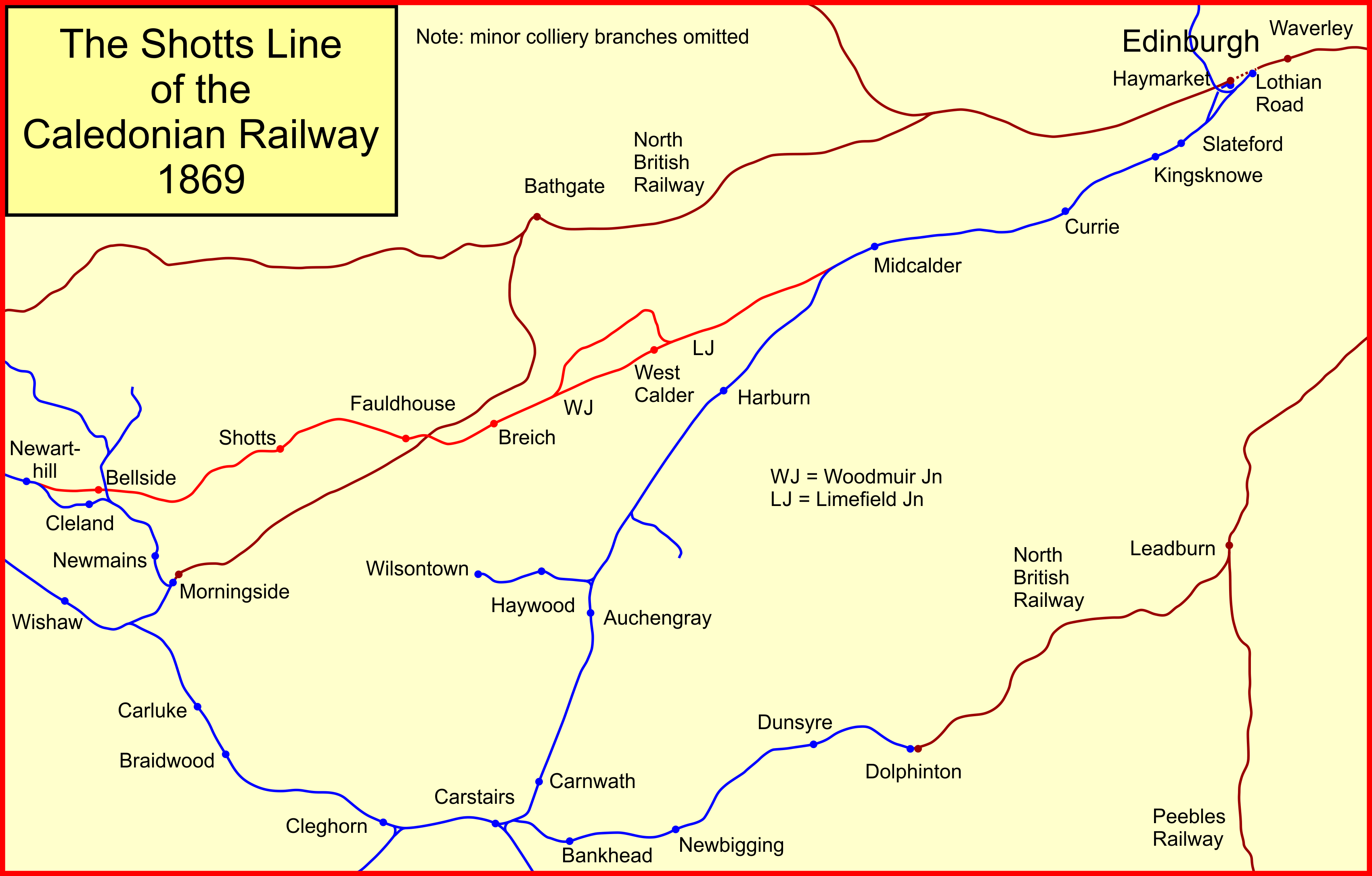
Caledonian lines to Edinburgh on the opening of the Shotts line

The Wishaw and Coltness Railway had long since opened its line, principally for mineral haulage, reaching as far east as Cleland by way of Holytown, and leased by the Caledonian Railway. In 1869 the line was extended from Cleland to a junction at Midcalder on the Carstairs - Edinburgh line; it ran via Hartwood, Fauldhouse, Addiewell and West Calder. The last two places were already established industrial centres, and shale extraction was a major activity; the industries were now brought in to the Caledonian network. The dominant traffic on the line was to be minerals, and numerous mines, shale pits and works were connected, from the start, or in the immediately succeeding years. A mineral line loop sweeping to the north of Addiewell and West Calder was provided, rejoining the line east of West Calder. The lines opened for goods and mineral trains on 1 January 1869.

Notwithstanding the mineral traffic dominance, a passenger service was started on 9 July 1869, between Glasgow and Edinburgh. This route was considerably shorter than the Caledonian's former route between the cities, and not much inferior to the Edinburgh and Glasgow Railway route, although the gradients of the Midcalder line were more challenging. Two stopping trains and two expresses ran each way daily, and the fares were set cheaper than the E&G fares; the latter had to be reduced to compete.

=== The Balerno line ===
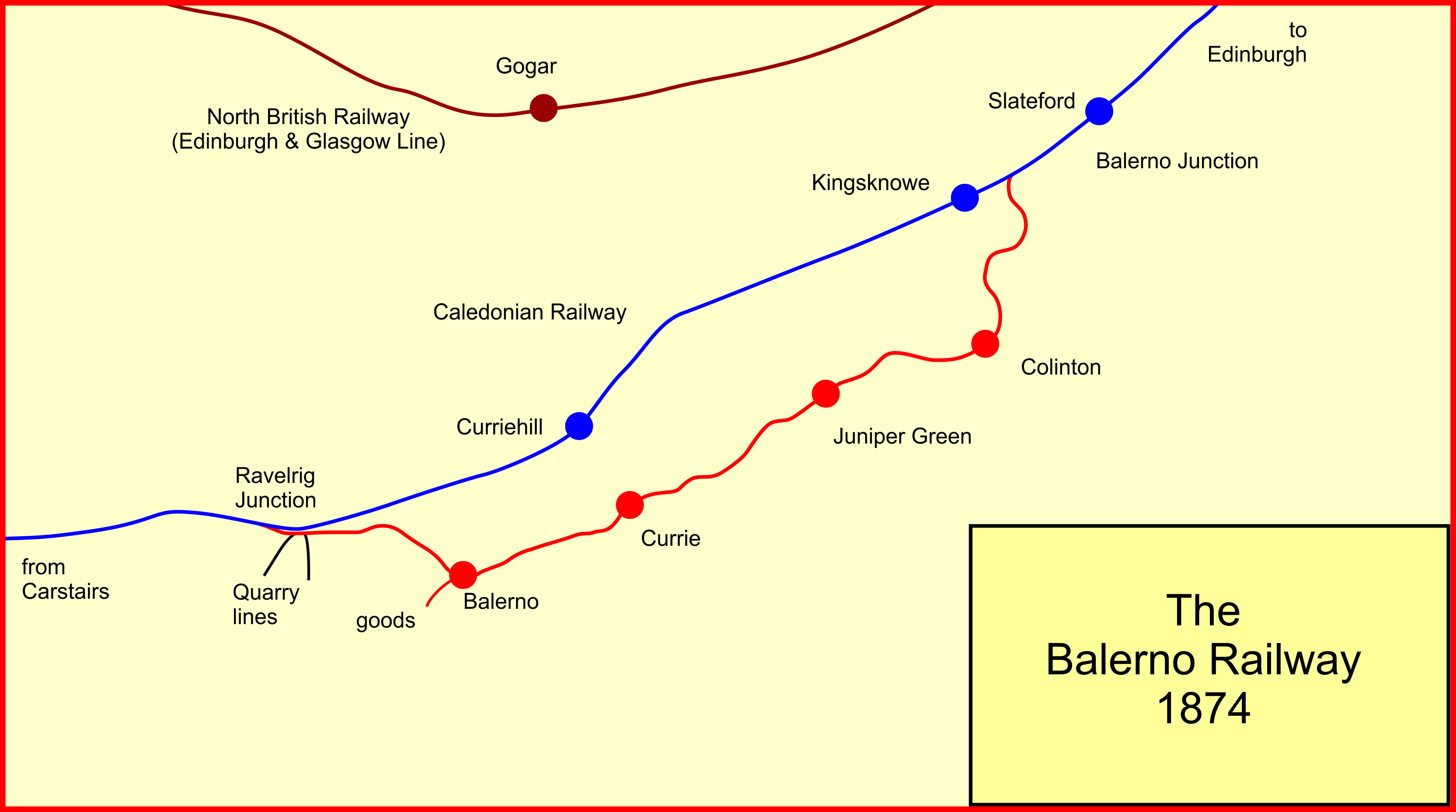
The Balerno railway of the Caledonian Railway

The main line from Carstairs to Edinburgh ran in a direct line, and approaching Slateford the line ran parallel to, and some distance on the north side of, the Water of Leith. Considerable industrial development took place adjacent to the watercourse: there were three paper mills, two quarries, a salt works and a tannery on the proposed line. On 29 June 1865 the Caledonian obtained authorisation in the Caledonian Railway (Balerno Branch) Act 1865 (28 & 29 Vict. c. clxi) to build a double track railway, the Balerno Branch, from a junction near Slateford, serving the industrial sites. Authorised share capital was £150,000, but when the Caledonian had raised most of the money, other priorities intruded and the cash was spent on other schemes for the time being. The original act had specified a penalty of £50 a day if the completion of the line was delayed, so in 1869 authorisation was obtained in the Caledonian Railway (Abandonment, &c.) Act 1869 (32 & 33 Vict. c. cxxvi) to abandon the Balerno branch.

The following year however the scheme was resurrected, this time as a cheaper, single track line, but continuing from Balerno to rejoin the Carstairs line at Ravelrig, forming a loop. The new Caledonian Railway (Additional Powers) Act 1870 (33 & 34 Vict. c. xliv) was obtained on 20 June 1870. The line finally opened on 1 August 1874. Balerno had a goods station in the location earlier intended as the passenger terminus in 1865, on a stub from the loop line. There was a passing loop on the single line at Currie. Ravelrig was a complex junction, and there were two mineral lines serving nearby quarries. The stations generated considerable volumes of residential passenger traffic. The attractive area also generated worthwhile volumes of "picnic" traffic in the summer months, and special excursion trains were run.

The extension from Balerno to Ravelrig did not have a regular service for extended periods, as was occasionally used for stabling the Royal Train when in the area.

Nonetheless the considerable extent of residential housing encouraged an excellent bus service from the 1930s, and travel by train became unattractive: the line closed to passenger traffic in 1943, temporarily. It was intended to reopen the line after the War, but this was never done. The official closure date is sometimes given as 1 June 1949. Goods trains ceased running in 1967.

=== Strawfrank curve ===
When the Caledonian main line had been opened, a direct line was provided by-passing Carstairs for trains running from Carlisle to Edinburgh; it was from Float Junction to Lampits Junction. In fact all passenger trains called at Carstairs; Edinburgh portions were detached and attached there, and did not use the curve. It is likely that goods traffic ran via Carstairs station also. The Lampits line closed in 1860.

On 10 October 1872 a new curve was opened, much closer to Carstairs station and much tighter; it was known as the Strawfrank curve. It is use today by most passenger trains between Edinburgh and Carlisle.

=== Later changes ===
After the first decades of the twentieth century, the extractive industries that had supported the heavy mineral traffic on these lines began to decline, and after 1950 collieries and the shale industries experienced a significant decline. In step with this, the importance of Leith and Granton harbours also declined. Street tramways and then motor buses made suburban passenger routes unattractive, and in rural areas too bus and lorry transport became more practical than the railway service. All of the local branches and many of the local stations closed, and in 1965 Princes Street station was closed, its main line traffic from Carstairs being transferred to Edinburgh Waverley over a connection near Haymarket that was a close relative of the 1853 connection. The only other remaining line in the area under consideration was the line from Glasgow via Cleland and Fauldhouse, usually thought of as the Shotts line, remained in operation although with an infrequent passenger service.

A short connection was however built in 1961 at Slateford; at this point the line passed over the Edinburgh Suburban Railway and a spur was put in during 1961 giving access for freight trains off the Carstairs and Shotts line towards the new marshalling yard being built at Millerhill.

From about 1980 there was a revival of interest in passenger rail travel, and daily travel to work over longer distances became commonplace. This led to some reopening of stations, and the Shotts Line now serves Edinburgh commuters as well as the rural towns on its route.

As of 2015 the Carstairs to Edinburgh route carries a significant long-distance passenger traffic to English destinations, as well as a medium distance semi-fast service between Edinburgh and Ayr via Glasgow. The Shotts line carries two trains an hour (typically) between Edinburgh and Glasgow, alternating stopping and semi-fast services.

== Topography ==
Carstairs to Edinburgh

Opened 15 February 1848; intermediate passenger station were closed on 18 April 1966 except where shown.

- Carstairs;
- Dolphinton Junction; trailing junction from Strawfrank Junction; facing junction towards Dolphinton (1867 - 1950);
- Carnwath;
- Auchengray;
- Wilsontown South Junction; facing junction to Wilsontown branch;
- Wilsontown North Junction; trailing junction from Wilsontown branch;
- Cobbinshaw; opened October 1874; relocated a short distance south on 4 October 1875;
- West Calder & Torphin; renamed Harburn 1869;
- New Park; renamed Newpark 1902; closed 14 September 1959;
- Midcalder Junction; trailing junction from Shotts;
- Midcalder; renamed Kirknewton 1982; still open;
- Ravelrig Platform, and junction for the Balerno line; opened 4 April 1884 unadvertised, for volunteer use; timetabled from May 1889 with a very limited service; sometimes known as Ravelrig Junction station; last in timetables June 1920, but reopened unadvertised for Dalmahoy Golf Club in 1927; closed after a few years;
- Currie; renamed Curriehill 1 August 1874 when Currie on the Balerno line was opened; closed 2 April 1951; reopened 5 October 1987; still open;
- Balerno Junction; trailing junction from the Balerno line;
- Slateford; renamed Kings Knowes 1 January 1853; renamed Kingsknowe shortly after; closed 1 January 1917; reopened 1 February 1919; closed 6 July 1964; reopened 1 February 1971; still open;
- Slateford; opened 1 January 1853; still open; facing junction 1961 to the Edinburgh Suburban Railway; facing junction to Haymarket; facing junction to Coltbridge Junction;
- Merchiston; opened 1 July 1882; closed 6 September 1965;
- Dalry Junction; trailing junction from Granton Harbour lines;
- Edinburgh, Lothian Road station; closed to passengers and transferred to Princes Street station 2 May 1870; Princes Street closed 6 September 1965.

Wilsontown Branch

Opened 1 March 1867; closed to passengers 10 September 1951; closed completely 4 May 1964.

- Wilsontown South and North Junctions; see above;
- Wilsontown West Junction; trailing apex of triangle;
- Haywood; spelt Heywood at first; opened November 1867 and soon renamed;
- Wilsontown; connected with extensive mineral tramways.

Shotts Line (from end of the Wishaw and Coltness line at Newarthill)

Opened 1 January 1869 for goods, and to passengers on 9 July 1869.

- Newarthill; closed 1 June 1880; reopened as Carfin 1 October 1927;
- Bellside; renamed Omoa 1879; renamed Cleland 1964;
- Hartwood; opened 1 May 1889; the station was available earlier "by signal", possibly for workmen's purposes;
- Shotts;
- Benhar Junction facing junction to Benhar Colliery;
- Fauldhouse; renamed Fauldhouse North from 1952 to 1973;
- Breich;
- Woodmuir Junction; facing junction to mineral deviation line;
- Addiewell; opened 1 July 1882;
- West Calder;
- Limefield Junction; trailing junction from mineral deviation line;
- Midcalder Junction; see above.

Balerno Line

Opened 1 August 1874; closed to passengers 1 November 1943; closed completely 1967.

- Ravelrig Junction; see above;
- Balerno;
- Currie;
- Juniper Green;
- Colinton;
- Hailes Halt; opened as unadvertised stop for golf course 16 November 1908; publicly advertised from 26 September 1927;
- Balerno Junction; see above.

Slateford to Coltbridge Junction

- Slateford; see above;
- Granton Junction; facing junction towards Haymarket;
- Coltbridge Junction; trailing junction from Dalry Junction.

Leith Branch

Opened 28 August 1861 to Granton Dock; the extension to Leith Dock was opened on 1 September 1864, and to passengers 1 August 1879; it closed to passengers 30 April 1962. The Granton Harbour line closed in 1965; Leith North closed completely in 1968; the New Lines Leith extension closed in 1984.

On 5 May 1958 diesel multiple units took over the Princes St to Leith North trains and services were increased from 15 to 27 a day.

- Dalry Junction; see above;
- Dalry Road; opened 2 July 1900; closed 30 April 1962;
- Dalry Middle Junction; facing junction for line towards Linlithgow;
- Coltbridge Junction; see above;
- Murrayfield;
- Craigleith; 1879 - 1962; and facing junction for Barnton line;
- Crew Junction; facing junction for Granton Harbour;
- Pilton East Junction; eastern apex of triangle for Granton Harbour;
- East Pilton Halt; opened 1 December 1934; renamed plain East Pilton November 1938;
- Granton Road;

Trinity

- Newhaven;
- Leith; renamed North Leith 1 August 1903; renamed Leith North 7 April 1952.

Barnton Branch

Opened 1 March 1894; closed 7 May 1951.

- Craigleith; see above;
- House o' Hill Halt; opened 1 February 1937;
- Barnton Gate; renamed Davidson's Mains 1 April 1903;
- Cramond Brig; renamed Barnton 1 April 1903.

== See also ==
- Caledonian Railway
- Caledonian Main Line
