= Merchiston railway station =

Former railway station in Scotland

Merchiston
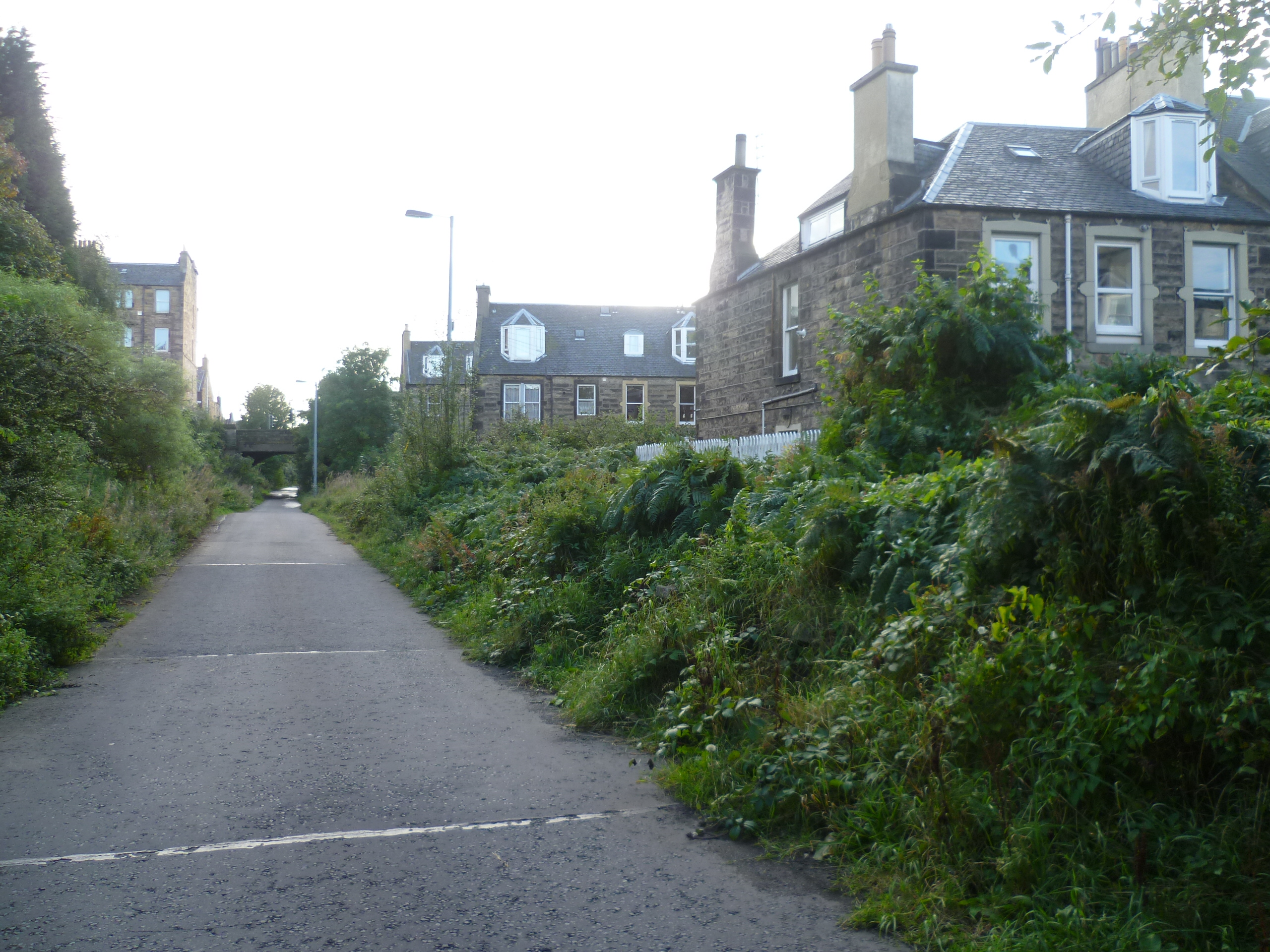
- Site of Merchiston Station (disused)

General information
- Location: Edinburgh, Edinburgh; Scotland
- Coordinates: 55.934636°N 3.228749°W
- Platforms: 2

Other information
- Status: Disused

History
- Original company: Caledonian Railway
- Post-grouping: LMS

Key dates
- 1 July 1882: Station opened
- 6 September 1965: Station closed
Location

Merchiston railway station was a railway station which served the area of Merchiston in Edinburgh, Scotland, for around eighty years. The station was built by the Caledonian Railway between 1879 and 1883, with the last passenger service in September 1965. The station was demolished shortly afterwards and the track bed has become a footpath.

The station was located in the neighbourhood sometimes known as "North Merchiston" but more commonly as Shandon, and typically taken to be part of the area of Polwarth, rather than Merchiston. Merchiston was also served by Craiglockhart railway station to the south-west of the area, on the North British Railway's Edinburgh Suburban and Southside Junction Railway.

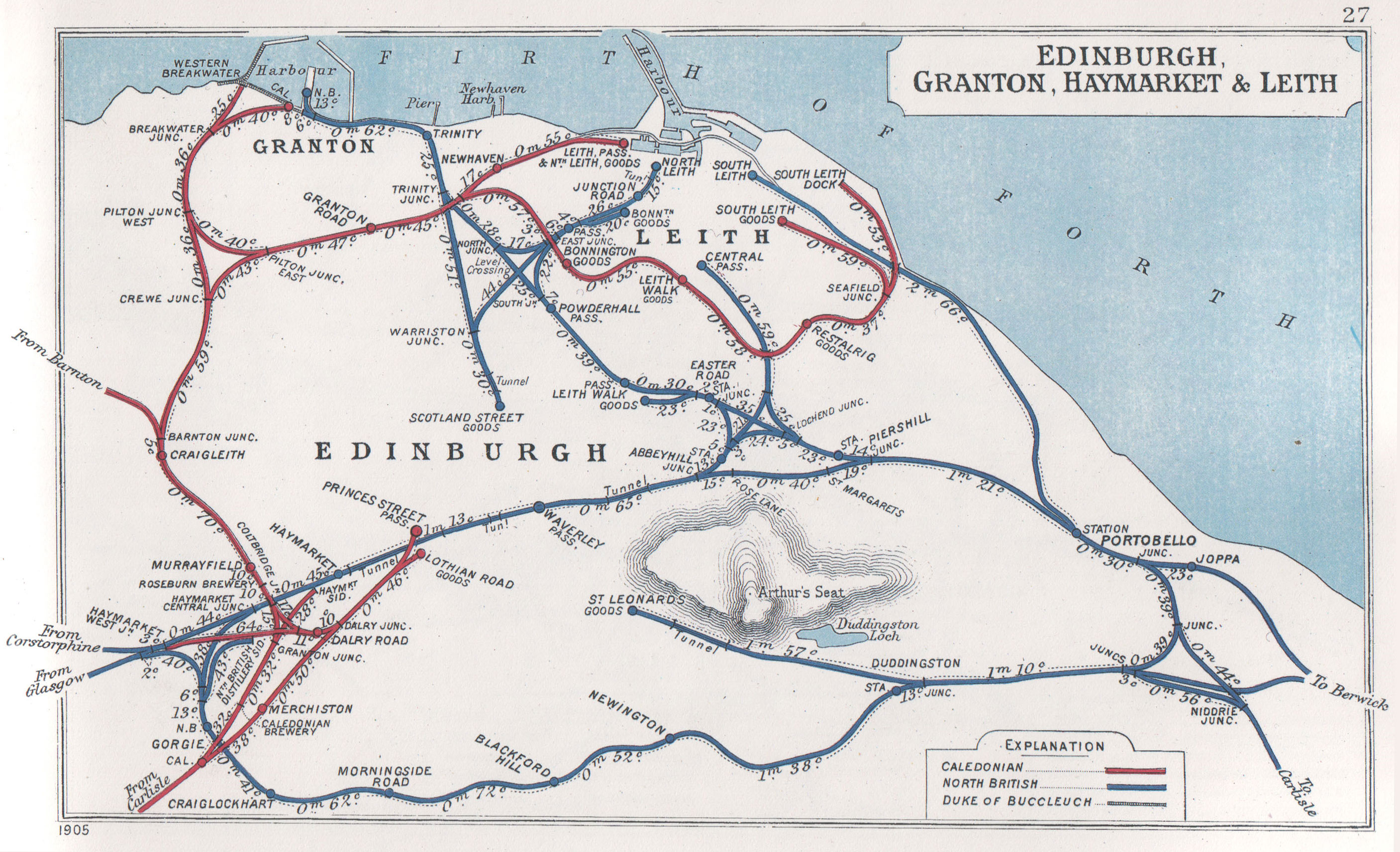
A 1905 Railway Clearing House diagram of Edinburgh railways, with the SSJR (in blue along the bottom)

== Construction of the station ==
The station was constructed between 1879 and 1883 with two platforms and a small overhead footbridge. The station was located around 1 km east of Slateford Station and approximately 2.25 km west of Princes Street Station, at the bottom of Bonaly Place (since renamed Harrison Place).

== Closure ==
The station closed on 6 September 1965 with services to/from Edinburgh Princes Street diverted to Edinburgh Waverley. After closure the first part of the old line from Princes Street Station became the West Approach Road, built in the 1970s . The part of the track occupying the former station at Merchiston is now a footpath, extending to a service road leading west to Slateford Yards.

Preceding station	Historical railways	Following station
Slateford	Caledonian Railway; CR Main Line	Princes Street; Line and station closed
