= Polwarth, Edinburgh =

Residential neighborhood in Scotland

Coordinates: 55°55′52″N 003°13′41″W

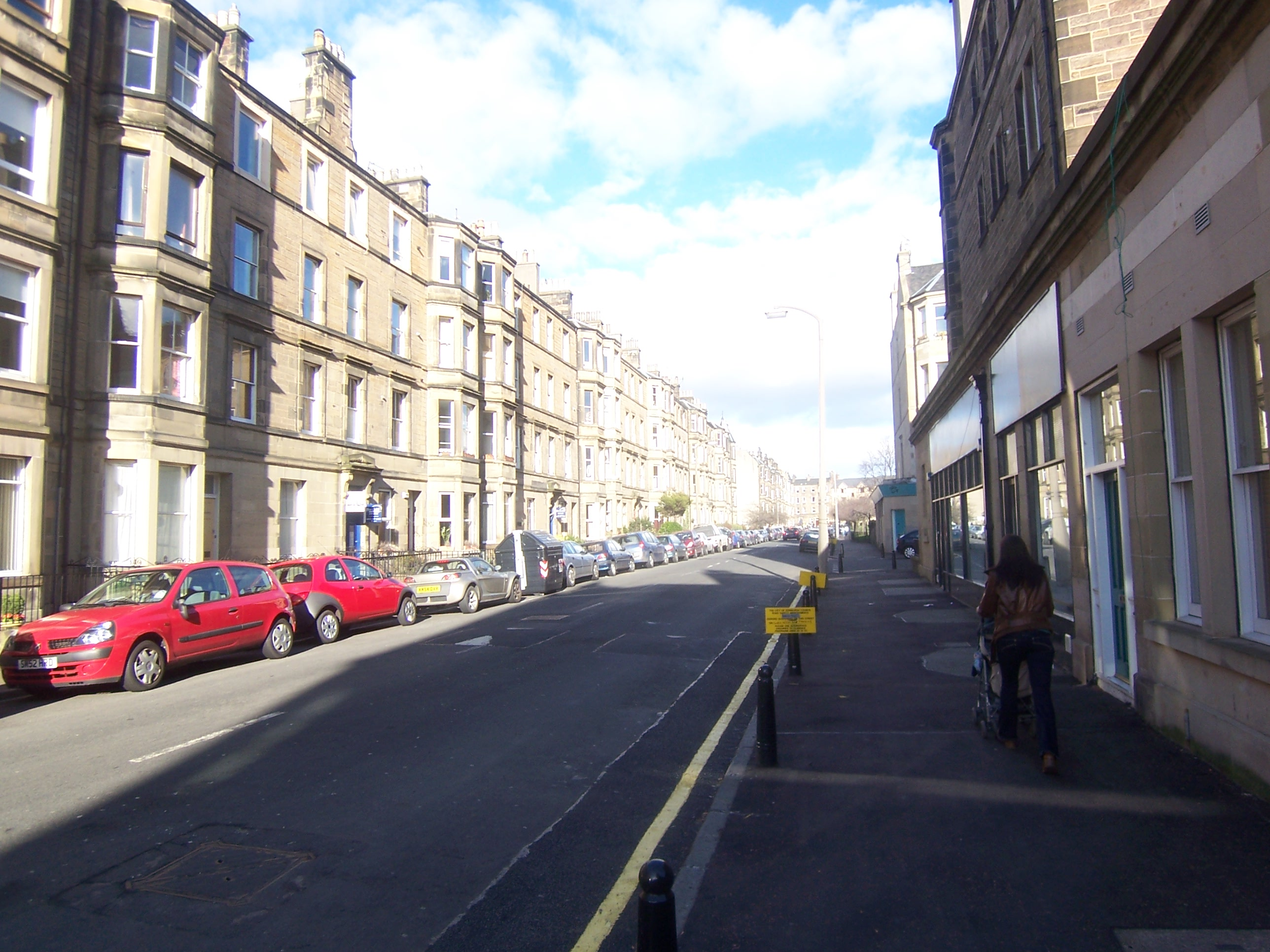
A typical row of tenements in Polwarth

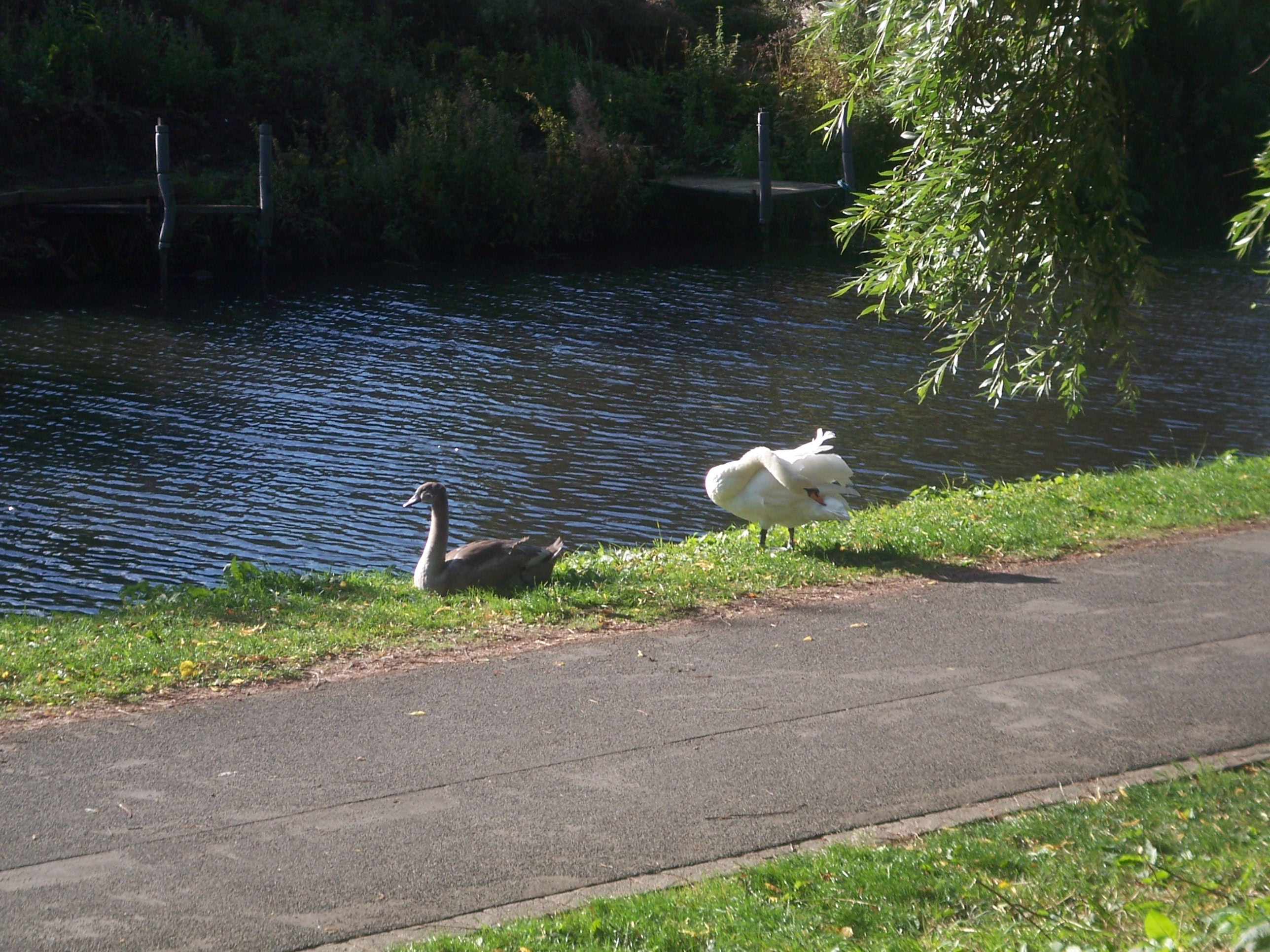
Swans on the Union Canal at Polwarth

Polwarth is a mainly residential area of Edinburgh, Scotland. It is bounded by Bruntsfield and Merchiston to the east and south, Gorgie and Dalry to the north, Fountainbridge to the north and east, and Craiglockhart to the west.

The Union Canal flows through Polwarth on its way from Edinburgh to Falkirk.

Although within the boundary of Merchiston Community Council, Harrison Park – on the north bank of the canal – is commonly taken to be part of Polwarth. Behind the tenements at the north of the park runs a footpath which was formerly track bed for the main line of the Caledonian Railway en route to the now-closed Princes Street railway station in the centre of the city. There was once a Merchiston Station on this line near the park.
