= Edward George Handel Lucas =

English painter

E G Handel Lucas
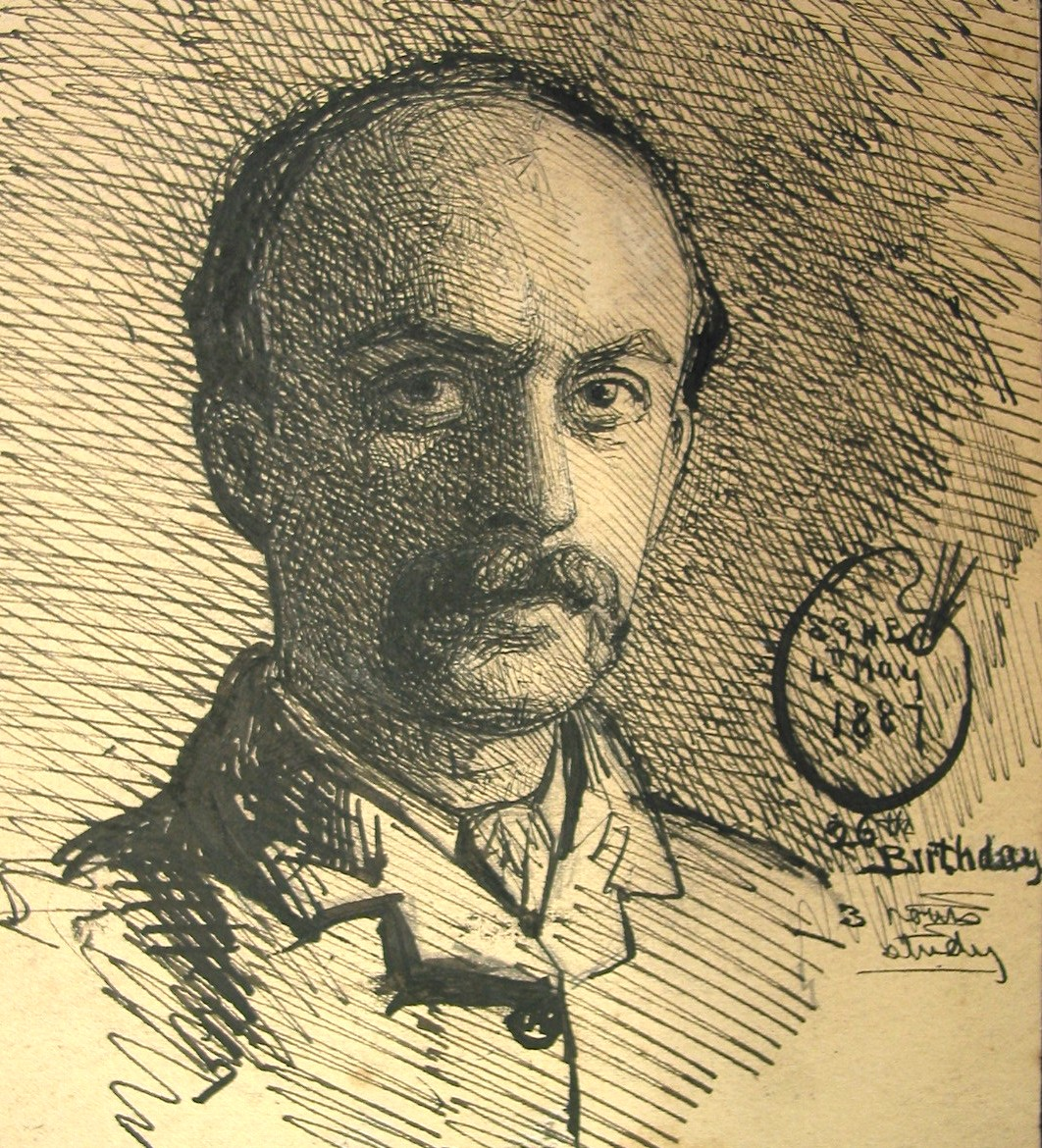
- Self Portrait, 1887
- Born: 4 May 1861; Croydon
- Died: 4 April 1936 (aged 74); Westcliff-on-Sea

E G Handel Lucas (1861–1936) was an English artist. He was hailed as a child prodigy and exhibited at the Royal Society of British Artists from the age of 14 and at the Royal Academy of Arts from age 17. He is best known for astonishingly realistic flower paintings and still lifes painted in the 1880s, 1890s and 1900s. His major works took anything from 6 to 16 months to paint.

Demand for his work fell when new artistic styles emerged in the 1900s. He fell into debt, a situation made worse when he became interested in photographic reproduction and invented a new printing process. The company he formed to perfect this process crashed and he lived the rest of his life in poverty. His paintings were forgotten about after his death, but interest revived when some started appearing in auction houses from 1972 onwards.

== Upbringing ==
Edward George Handel Lucas was born in Croydon on 4 May 1861. He was the eldest of five children of a Croydon tailor with a passion for music who named him Handel after his favourite composer. The family had limited means and Lucas attended the Whitgift Middle School, now called Trinity School of John Whitgift, which at that time provided education from age 7 to 14 for sons of the poor of the parish. So Lucas did not benefit from a classical or advanced education, but there is evidence of him drawing and painting from age 6 or 7 and receiving some encouragement from the school.

== Artistic education ==
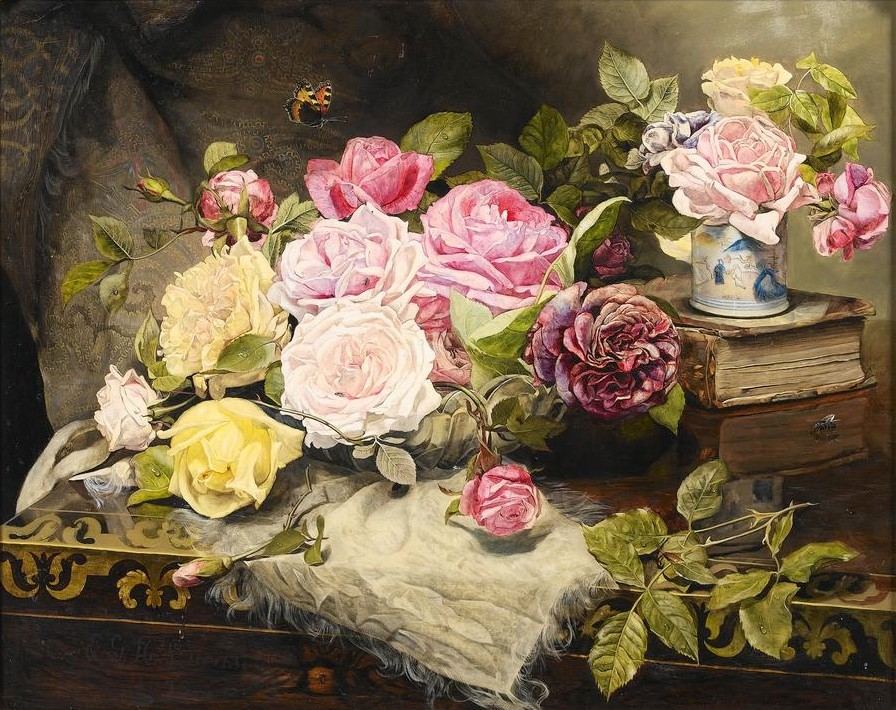
Roses from the Vicarage, 1878

Although Lucas left school at age 14, he was recognised as a child prodigy as a painter and exhibited with the Royal Society of British Artists when still 14, one of their youngest ever exhibitors at the time, if not the youngest.

He spent the next few years producing flower paintings in a small lean-to by the family house and used the proceeds from sales to fund some limited artistic study. He "studied the antique" at the British Museum and life drawing in the evenings at Heatherley School of Fine Art in London. Then, for a short while, he studied at the St John's Wood Art School, but he remained mainly self-taught.

At age 17 he had his first picture accepted for exhibition at the Royal Academy of Arts. This was a still life called Roses from the Vicarage and it sold on the opening day for £30.

== Early career, 1880s ==
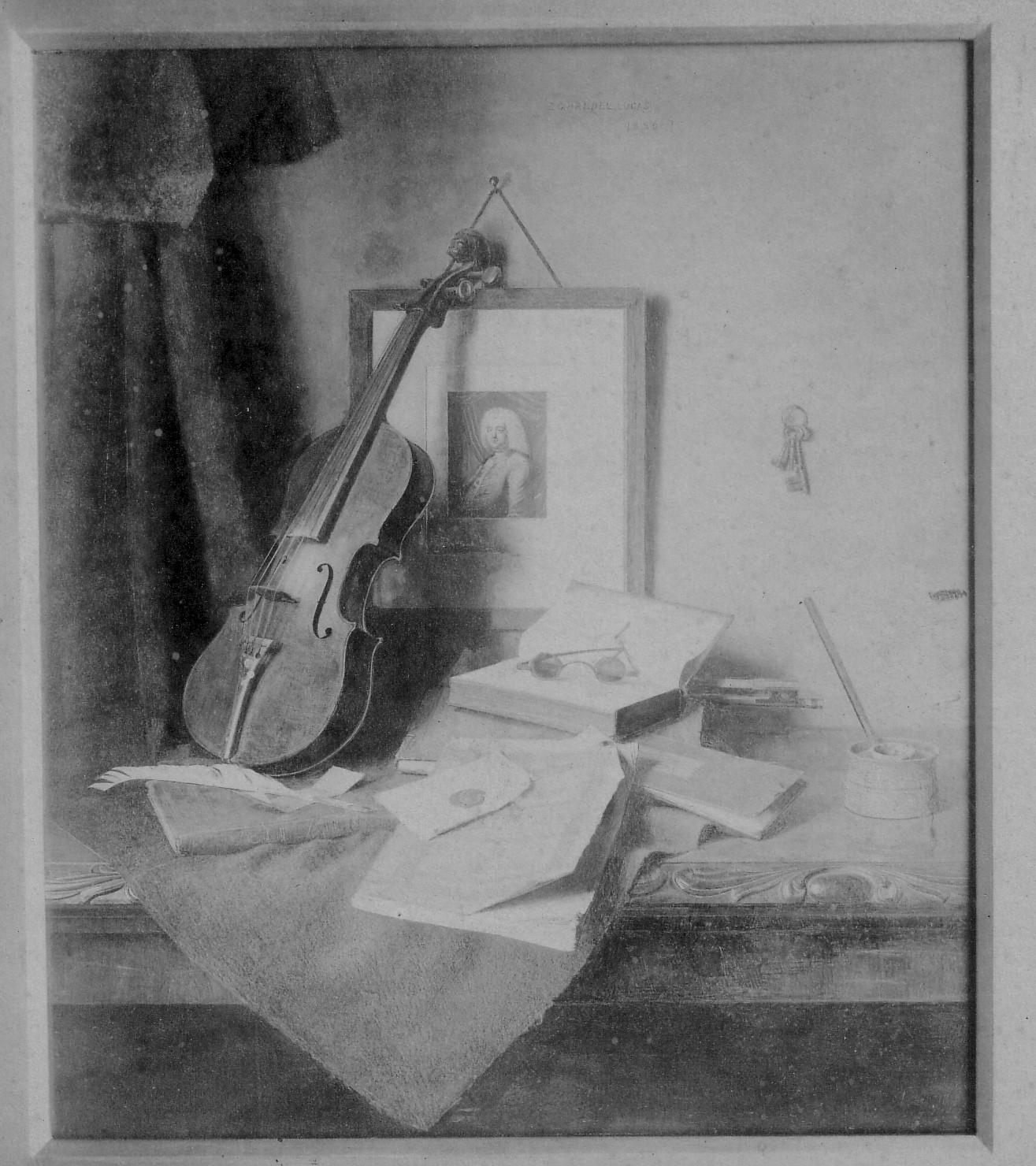
B&W photo of Dust Crowns All, 1887

Lucas continued to paint flower pictures as his career developed and also more elaborate still lifes. These were notable for an astonishing level of detail and realism across the whole picture. A good example is Dust Crowns All, which is described in a lengthy article about Lucas's career to date, published in The Croydon Advertiser in 1887. The writer says "to see the delicacy of the work one has to use a magnifying glass, and the more closely it is examined, the more beauty will be found".

This level of detail and realism came at a cost. The Croydon Advertiser article says "none of his exhibited pictures has taken less than six months of real honest work" and that Dust Crowns All had already taken "fifteen months of almost incessant labour" and was not finished yet.

These works were very well received. Lucas had at least one painting accepted for exhibition at the Royal Academy of Arts almost every year between 1879 and 1891, sometimes exhibited "on the line", a rare privilege for an "outsider". He received flattering reviews in The Daily News, The Magazine of Art, The Athenaeum and The Times.

He told The Croydon Advertiser he was keen to move on from still life to figurative work, but he had continued to paint still lifes "for the last two or three years for economical reasons, as they always sell, when an experimental figure picture might ruin me by remaining without a purchaser". This fear would resonate later in his career.

He went to Italy for a year or two around 1888–1889, studying at the British Academy in Rome and painting landscapes in Rome, Capri and Pompeii.

== Prime of his career, 1890s and early 1900s ==
During the 1890s, Lucas painted mainly still lifes, often with anecdotal and sometimes moralistic subjects such as Sairey Gamp's Treasures or Silent Advocates of Temperance. There were only about one or two major paintings per year.

He married Clara Mary Stunell (known as Mary) in 1895 and they settled in Croydon where they had two daughters, Elsie Cecil Lucas born in 1899, and Marie Newton Lucas born in 1900.

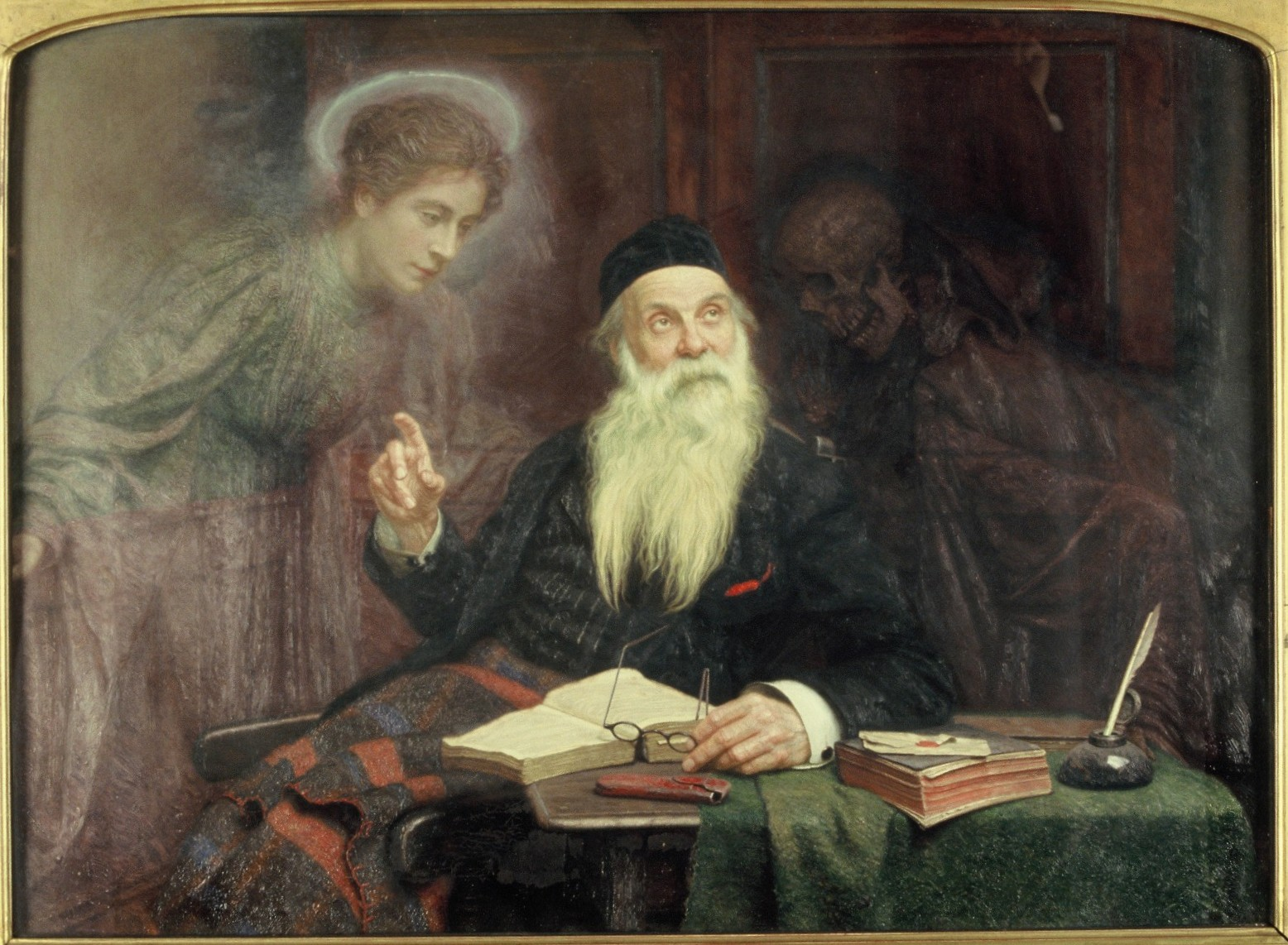
The Two Voices, 1901–1905

Around the turn of the century his focus finally turned more to figurative works. One of these, The Two Voices, took two years of effort to paint (started in 1900 and reworked in 1904) and was regarded by Lucas as the conclusion of his training as an artist, demonstrating his mastery of figurative painting. But it did not sell and the time spent painting it exhausted his capital. Thus started a cycle on indebtedness, borrowing money from family and friends to keep him going while he painted a new work, promising to pay them back when he sold it. His worst fears of 1887 were coming true!

Ironically his prime in technical terms coincided with public taste moving away from the realism that Lucas prized. The Impressionists and their successors were becoming popular but Lucas dismissed them in strong terms and preferred to stick to his roots, painting "straight from nature".

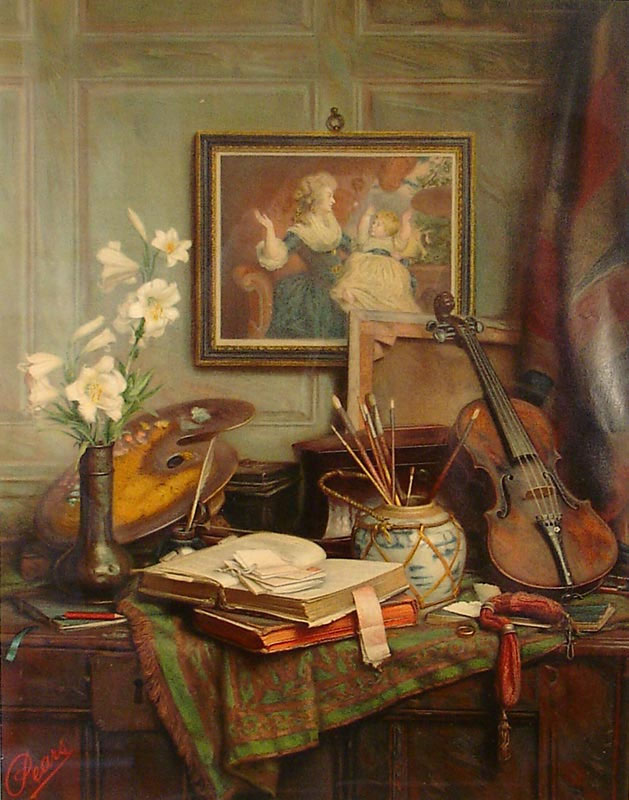
Some of Life's Pleasures, 1907

But one new market opened up for him when the Pears soap company bought some of his paintings for publication as 15 by 12-inch colour prints in the Pears' Annual:

- The Cause of Many Troubles was bought in 1903 for the "phenomenal price" of £106 and published in 1906.
- Of Such is the Kingdom of Heaven was bought in 1905 for £150, although Pears' intention to publish this was not fulfilled.
- Some of Life's Pleasures was bought in 1908 and published in 1909, but the price was "only" £81 because Lucas was desperate for money to repay debts and had to beg them to conclude the sale.

Lucas also focused on portrait painting to try and cash in on his mastery of figurative work. One portrait, of the organist and professor of music H. L. Balfour, was exhibited at the Royal Academy of Arts in 1908.

== Debt and misfortune ==
In 1908 Lucas suffered a bout of pneumonia and a few months later a nervous breakdown caused by worry over unpaid rates. His doctor advised a move for the sake of his health and he and the family moved to Brighton in July 1909. Rent there was twice what it had been in Croydon, but he hoped to make a living teaching. He took tenants to help with the rent.

Around this time he became interested in photographic reproduction and in Brighton he met Otto Pfenninger and Edwin T Butler, each of whom had invented one-exposure colour cameras. Involvement with these men led to Lucas filing a patent for a new printing process that he invented. A company, the Handeltype Syndicate Ltd, was formed in 1913 to perfect this process and Lucas persuaded friends and relatives to invest, but the company crashed the following year and everyone lost their money.

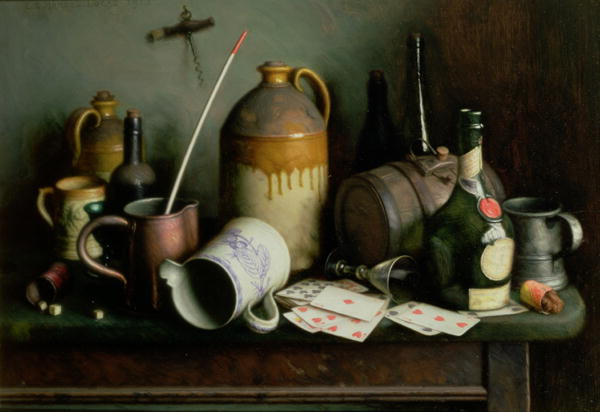
Foes in the Guise of Friends, 1913

Lucas was unable to pay the rent and asked the landlady for time to complete and sell a painting, Foes in the Guise of Friends, but she refused and the family was evicted. Lucas went to pieces for a while, but eventually found work designing Christmas cards for a friend's Christmas card factory and a flat in Streatham for the family to live in.

He had no studio so could not paint, but he was still interested in photographic printing techniques and borrowed money from family to pay annual patent fees. He also invented a process called Handelchrome that involved transferring a photograph onto glass and painting it from behind.

He intended using Handelchrome for portrait work and did so in a very limited way, but otherwise his inventions came to nothing and he continued to struggle for money for the rest of his life. He was painting again from the mid-1920s onwards, but was unable to command the prices he achieved earlier in his career. One notable success was a small group of paintings sold to Brooke Bond. One of them, The Stolen Nest, was published as a calendar in 1929 with a print run of 316,000.

Lucas suffered a fatal heart attack after his wife, Mary, was knocked down and injured by a car. He died on 4 April 1936, aged 74.

== Posthumous recognition ==
The art world forgot all about E G Handel Lucas until one of his still lifes, Dust Crowns All, appeared in a Sotheby's sale of Victorian paintings in 1972. It was bid to £2000, unusually high for a still life by an unknown artist. It caught the attention of Geraldine Norman, Saleroom Correspondent for The Times and she published an article comparing Lucas's work favourably with that of William Harnett. Interest raised by that article led to more of Lucas's paintings being put on the market and successful sales have demonstrated that his work is appreciated once more. Geraldine mentions Lucas's two daughters visiting Sotheby's a day or so before the sale bringing various documents and press cuttings concerning their father's career. Amongst these a letter of 1892 concerned the sale of a painting "The Seven Ages of Man" to the Grosvenor Gallery which she recalled seeing at John Lobb Bootmaker, 9 St James's Street, where it still on display to this day.

== His nephew, Edwin G Lucas ==
E G Handel Lucas had a nephew Edwin G Lucas who also became a notable artist. Edwin was inspired by Surrealism and developed his own "highly innovative take on Surrealism". Handel would probably not have approved, given his strong negative views on modernist art. Handel died very early in Edwin's career and his biggest influence was contributing to family pressure on Edwin not to rely on art as his sole means of making a living.
