= Caley Station =

1942 painting by Edwin George Lucas

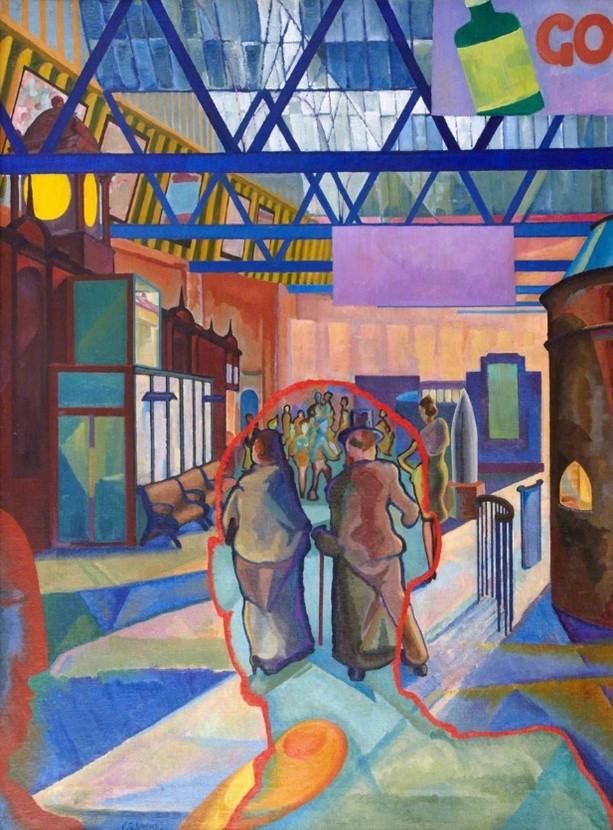
- Artist: Edwin G Lucas
- Year: 1942
- Medium: Oil on canvas
- Dimensions: 99cm x 73.7cm
- Location: City Art Centre, Edinburgh

Caley Station is an oil painting by Edwin G Lucas in 1942. Lucas created paintings that were surrealist in nature and were unique to 20th Century British Art. This painting was a part of the 15th Edinburgh Art Festival in 2018, where Edinburgh visual arts were celebrated. It is currently placed at the City Art Centre, Edinburgh.

== About ==
The Princes Street railway station was the entry point into the Capital, Edinburgh. An exhibition in 2019 at the Waldorf Astoria Edinburgh - The Caledonian, which was erected where the station once stood, brought back fond memories of the station and brought this painting again to fame. The station was lovingly known as The Caley, and this painting of The Caley captured the life at the station aptly. The station's terminus, Juniper Green, was the place the artist lived from 1917 to 1947. Several of his works were inspired by the scenery outside his carriage window as he rode to school and his job. He started producing watercolours of the Water of Leith valley, views from the Pentlands, and the surroundings of Juniper Green in the 1930s. Surrealist efforts by Lucas, which were avant-garde at the time, were among the movement's limited contacts with Scottish art. He had few chances to exhibit his most Avant-garde work; thus, the arts establishment paid him little attention. This picture, which the artist considered to be his best recollection of Edinburgh, was given to the city in 1990, the year he died.

== Description ==
The painting depicts the crowd rushing past the ticket counter at the station. However, through a silhouette of the artist himself, the painting takes us to a past where the sight of the grand Victorian inside of Princes Street Station is seen. His personal silhouette serves as a visual cue that this is his very own unique interpretation of the scene. The sun entering through the glass roofs shows the architectural details in Lucas's paintings that are similar to that in modern photographs.
