= Edinburgh Princes Street railway station =

Former railway station in Scotland

Coordinates: 55°56′57″N 3°12′27″W

Edinburgh Princes Street
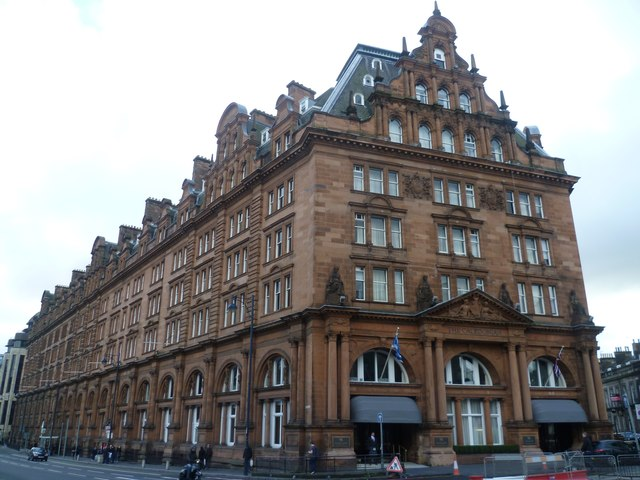
- Waldorf Astoria Edinburgh - The Caledonian, is the main surviving part of the former station complex

General information
- Location: Edinburgh, Edinburgh; Scotland
- Platforms: 7

Other information
- Status: Disused

History
- Original company: Caledonian Railway
- Post-grouping: LMS

Key dates
- 2 May 1870: Temporary wooden station opened
- 1890: Partly destroyed by fire & building work on permanent station started
- 1893: Permanent station brought into use
- 1903: Hotel added
- 6 September 1965: Station closed
Location

Princes Street Station was a mainline railway station which stood at the west end of Princes Street, in Edinburgh, Scotland, for almost 100 years. Temporary stations were opened in 1848 and 1870, with construction of the main station commencing in the 1890s. The station was closed completely in 1965 and largely demolished in 1969–70. Only its hotel remains, but it is no longer in railway ownership.

== Previous stations ==
In April 1847, the foundation stone for the Caledonian Railway company's Edinburgh station was ceremonially laid. Designed by William Tite, the station was to be a large Italianate structure. Due to the railway company's lack of funds this was not built and when the first services arrived in February 1848 there was only a temporary station with basic facilities, called Lothian Road Station from its location on that street.

By 1870, with increasing traffic, it was decided to build a new station slightly further north, still on Lothian Road but nearer Princes Street. Renamed Princes Street Station, it was opened in May 1870. It was built of timber with a pitched, slated roof. In June 1890, the building, which had been called the "wooden shanty", suffered a major blaze.

== Construction of the Princes Street terminus ==
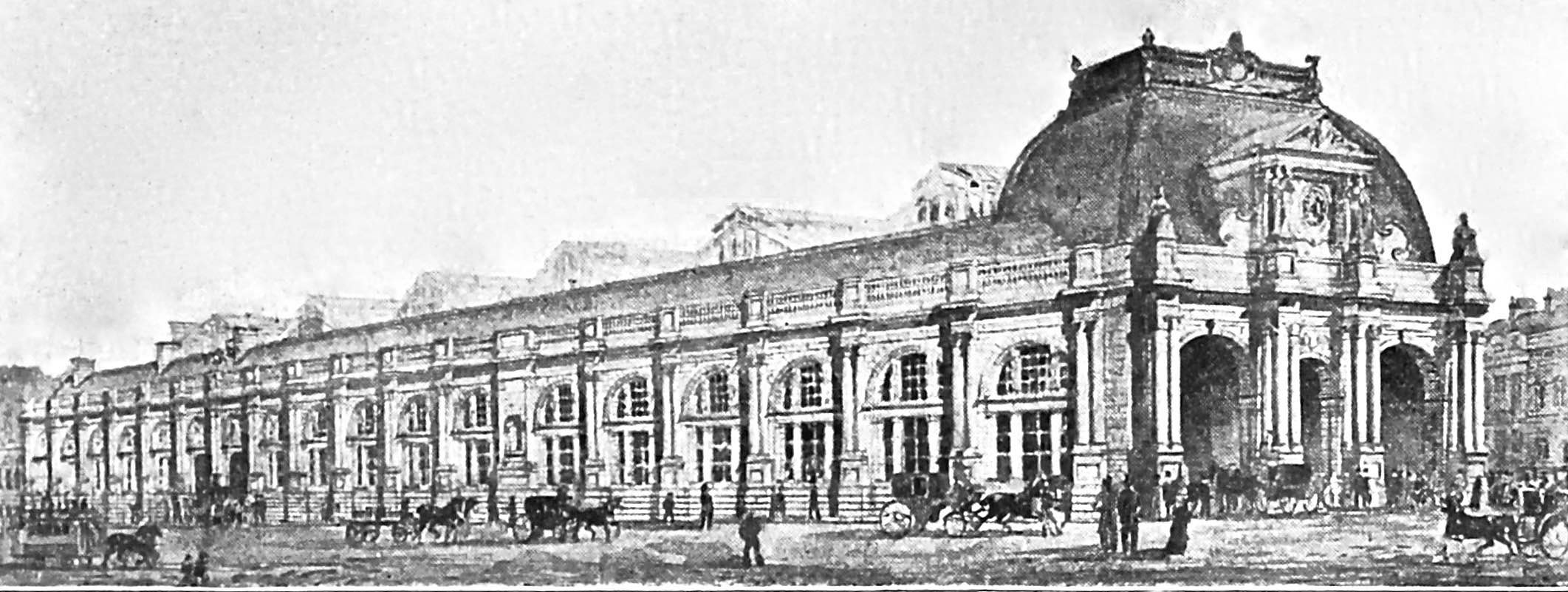
drawing of 1890s station

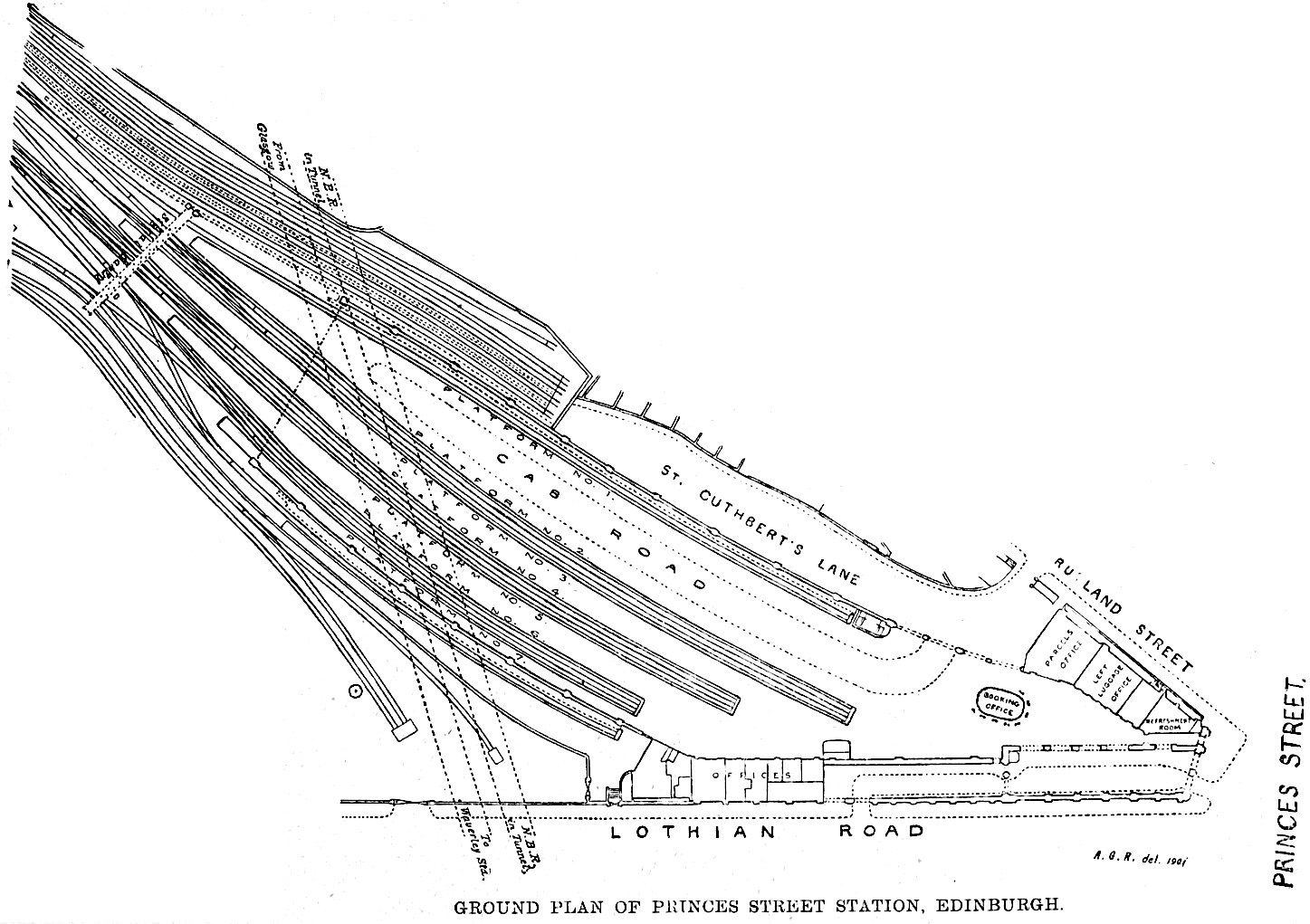
1901 station plan – north is to the right

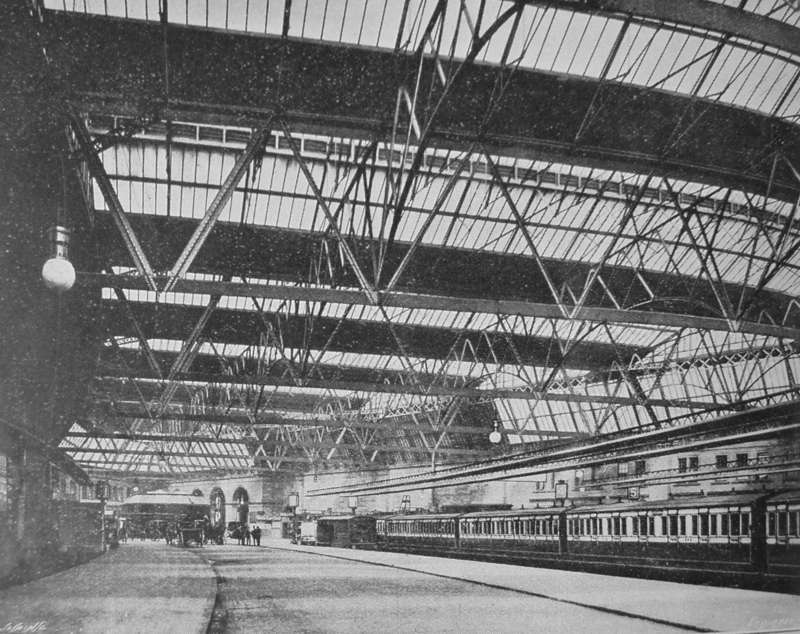
Edinburgh Princes Street Station of 1894+, interior of the trainshed.

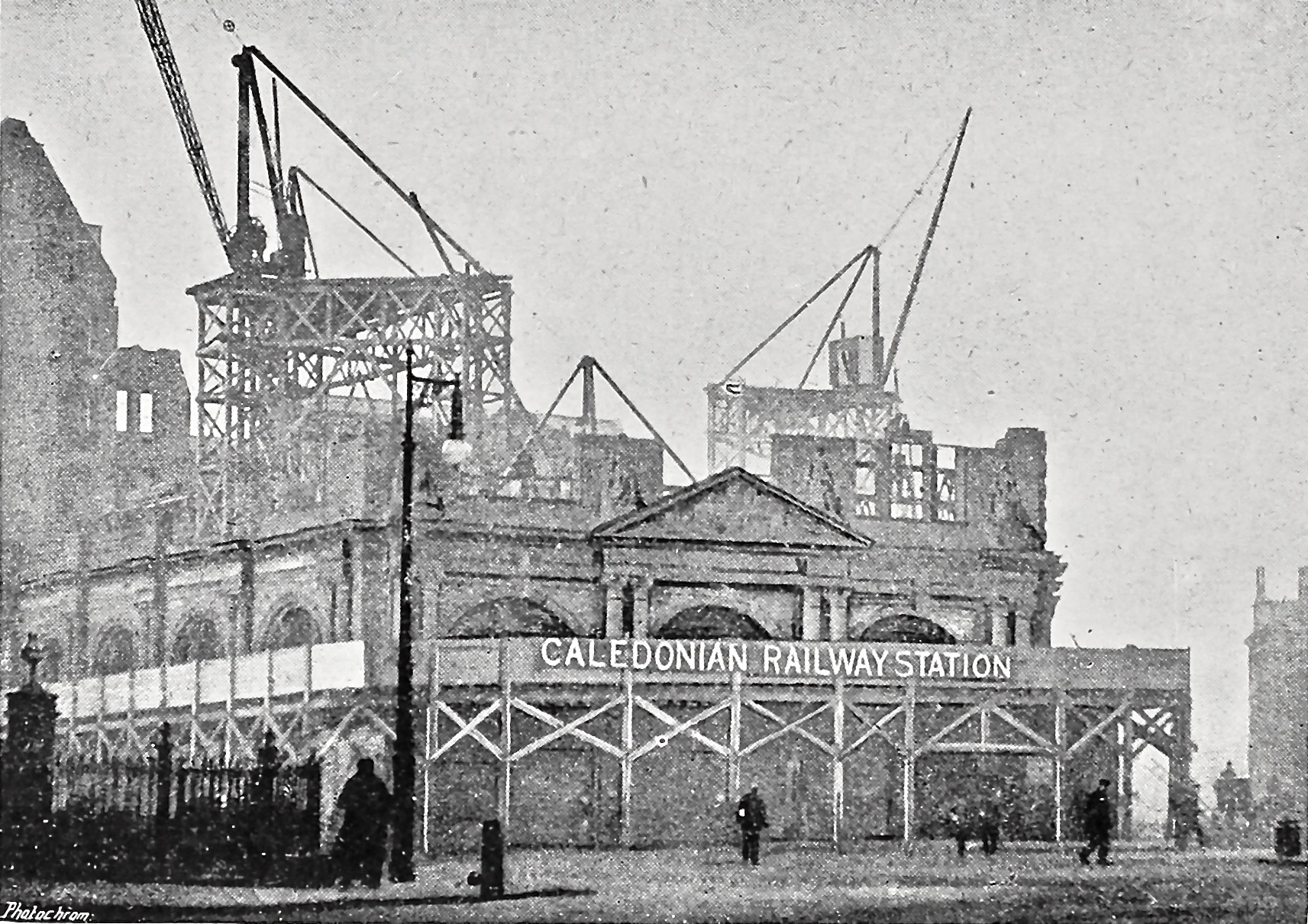
Hotel under construction

Due to further increases in traffic, plans had already been made for a new station and between 1890 and 1893 a grand station with seven platforms and an 850 ft long bayed roof was erected. Initially it had its own power station, to the west of the station in Rutland Court, to power its lighting. Parcels and goods were dealt with at the nearby Lothian Road station.

In 1899, work started on building a grand railway hotel above the main three archway entrance of the station, and opened in 1903 as Princes Street Station Hotel. It was commonly known as The Caledonian Hotel. It was designed by Edinburgh architects, Peddie and Washington Browne. The main pedestrian entrance to the station became the right hand arch of the original three while vehicular access was by way of Rutland Street. Both the station and the hotel were built in red sandstone in common with most Caledonian Railway buildings.

== Mainline and suburban services ==
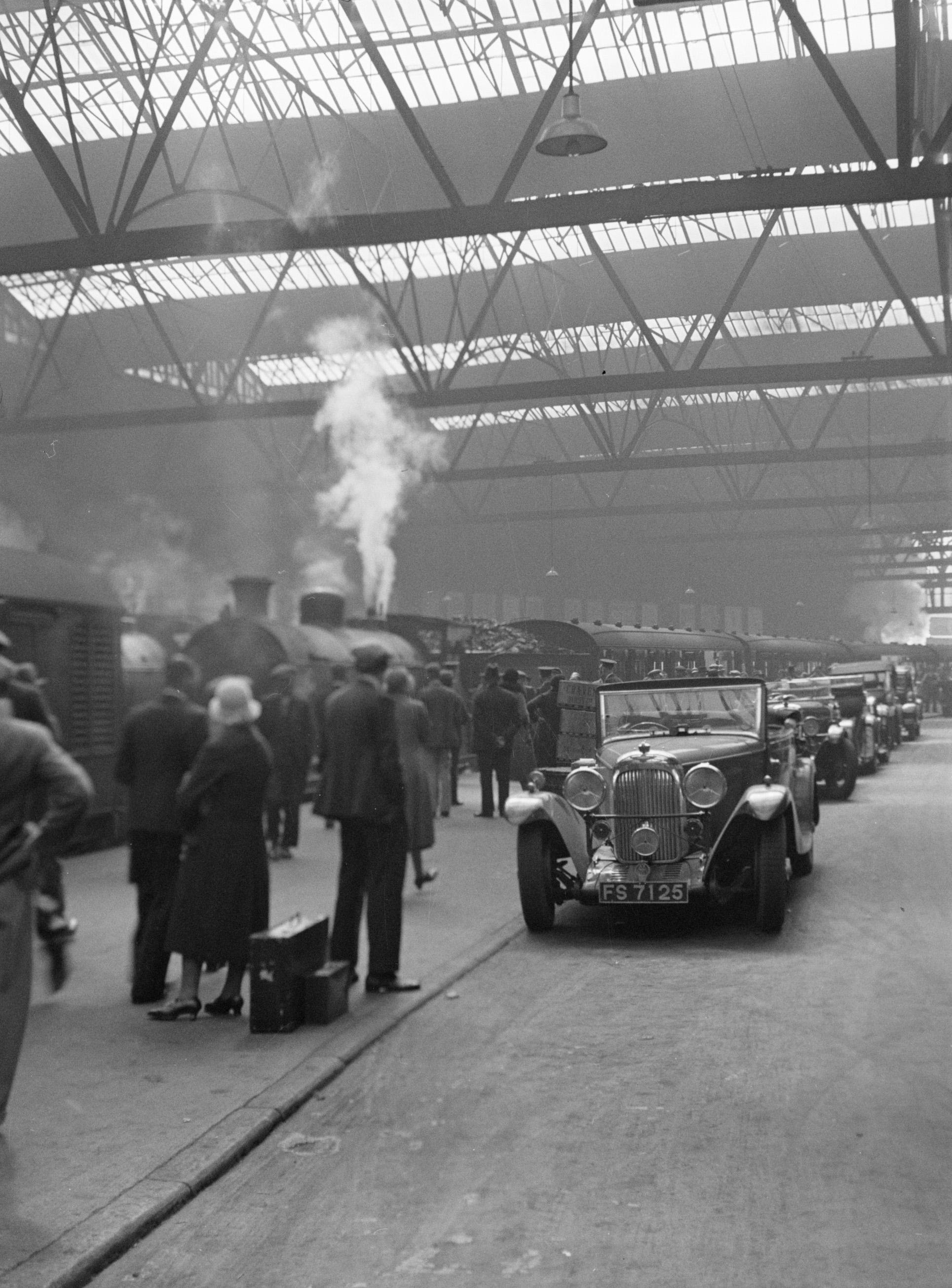
The cab road alongside platform 2, in 1934

The mainline to London, via Carstairs, headed southwest from the station, which was later augmented with a number of suburban stops, Merchiston, Slateford, and Kingsknowe, and a branchline to Colinton and Balerno. The Caledonian railway company later added other suburban lines serving the north and west of the city, including Barnton, Davidson's Mains, Granton, and Leith. In 1901, on weekdays, there were five trains a day to England, 20 to Carlisle, 16 to Glasgow (11 taking 65mins), 10 to Aberdeen and local trains to Balerno, Cramond Brig (later renamed Barnton) and Leith. There were also through coaches to many destinations, including Liverpool, Manchester, Oban and Stranraer.

== Closure ==
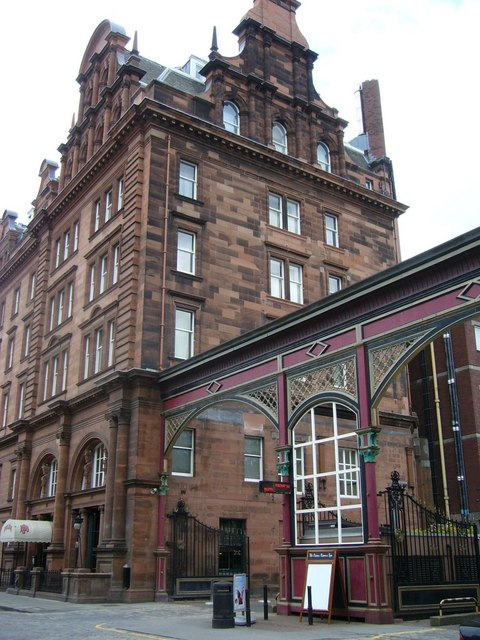
View of preserved station gates from Rutland Street

After nationalisation of the railways in 1948, it was considered logical to concentrate all rail services in Edinburgh at one station. With Waverley Station a short distance along Princes Street beyond Princes Street Gardens, by the 1960s Princes Street Station was seen as surplus to requirements. Although its street-level entrance was rather more convenient for travellers than that of Waverley (which is in the valley between Princes Street and the Old Town and requires a steep climb to reach street level), the latter was much larger, more conveniently located within the city, and (crucially) had access to the East Coast Main Line. After closure of Princes Street, the west of the city would continue to be served by nearby Haymarket Station.

Local services were gradually withdrawn, following those to Balerno in 1943, starting with services to Barnton in 1951, Leith North in 1962, and stopping trains on the main line to Carstairs in 1964. The remaining services to Glasgow Central, Stirling and English cities were then diverted to Waverley, allowing Princes Street Station to be closed in September 1965. The station was demolished in 1969–70, with the West Approach Road being built along the track bed in the early 1970s. The hotel still operates on the site and has been renamed The Caledonian Edinburgh Hotel. Part of the station space still remains within it and the vehicle entrance screen is still visible at the side of the hotel. The former Parcels Office survived on Lothian Road between the hotel and the West Approach Road, until a major office development was constructed on its site in the 1990s.

== See also ==
- British Transport Hotels
- Caley Station – Surrealist painting of the station by Edwin G Lucas

| Preceding station | Historical railways | Following station |
|---|---|---|
| Terminus | Caledonian Railway; CR Main Line | Merchiston; Line and station closed |
| Terminus | Caledonian Railway; Granton Branch | Dalry Road; Line and station closed |
| Terminus | CR and NBR; Dalry Road Lines | Dalry Road Lines to westbound Edinburgh and Glasgow Railway; Line closed |
