= Slateford railway station =

Railway station in Edinburgh, Scotland

Slateford Scottish Gaelic: Àth na Sglèata
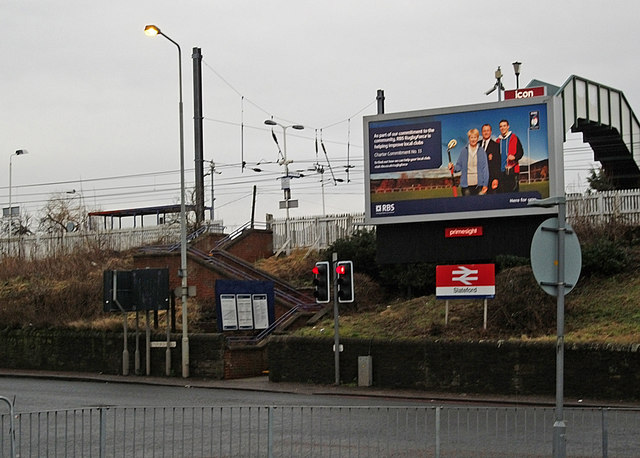

General information
- Location: Slateford, Edinburgh; Scotland
- Coordinates: 55.9265°N 3.2441°W
- Grid reference: NT223710
- Manager: ScotRail
- Platforms: 2

Other information
- Station code: SLA

History
- Opened: January 1853

Passengers
- 2020/21: ▼11,242
- 2021/22: ▲30,572
- 2022/23: ▲44,368
- 2023/24: ▲65,584
- 2024/25: ▲71,928
- 2025/26: ▲82,320
Location
Notes
- Passenger statistics from the Office of Rail and Road

Slateford railway station is a railway station serving Slateford in the city of Edinburgh, Scotland. It is located on the Shotts Line from Glasgow Central to Edinburgh Waverley via Shotts. The station has two platforms, connected by a stairway footbridge, and CCTV. It is managed by ScotRail.

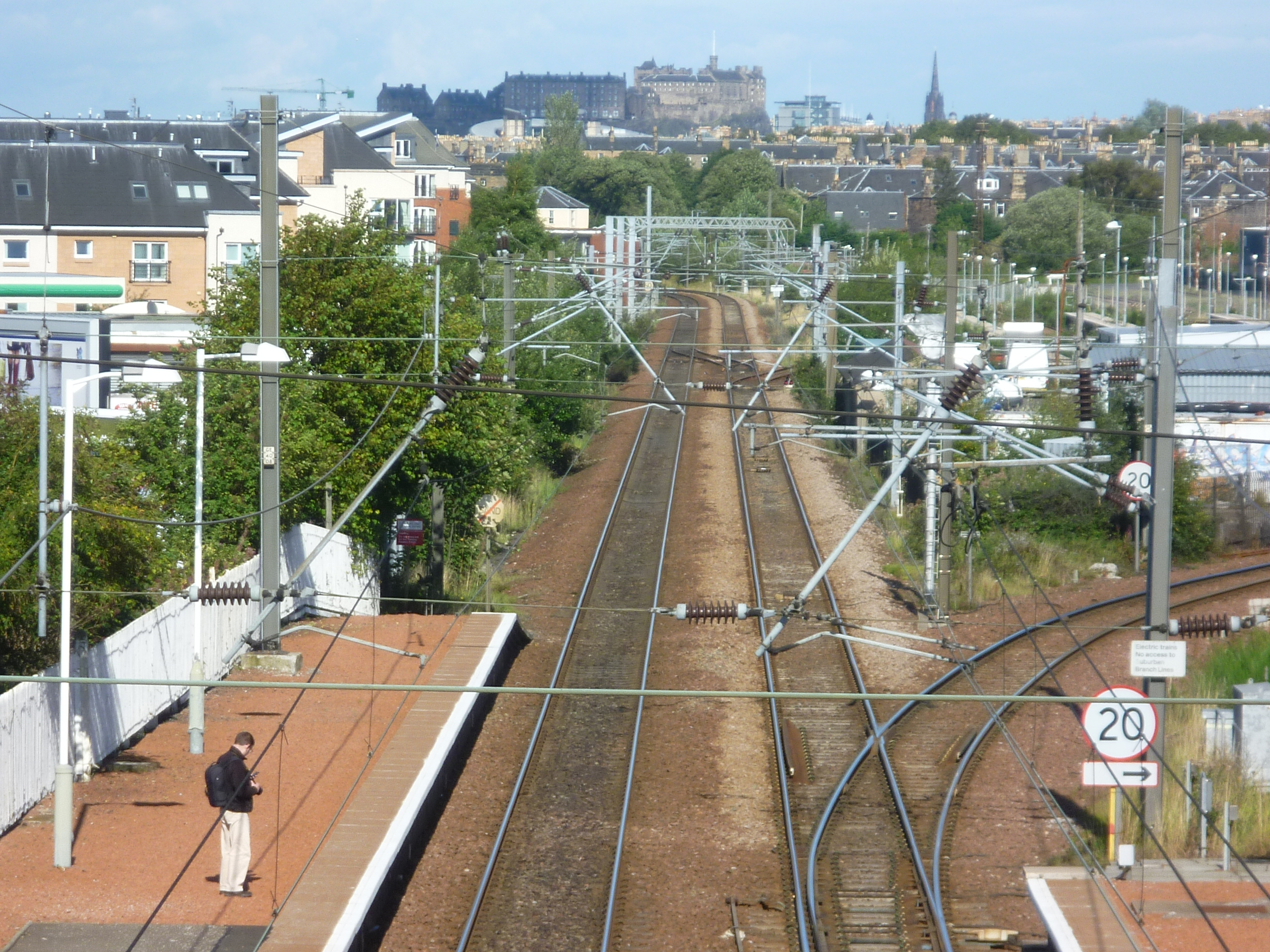
Slateford station in September 2011

It is currently served, Monday to Saturday, by one ScotRail service each hour from Glasgow Central to Edinburgh Waverley with a two-hourly Sunday service. There are also additional services, one from Motherwell to Edinburgh in the early morning with a late evening return and a morning peak service from Glasgow Central to Edinburgh via Carstairs, returning in the evening peak.

The staple passenger traction calling at this station is the Class 385 Scotrail “Express” Electric Multiple Unit, however it is also served by Class 380 “Desiro” EMUs. As this station lies on the spur of the West Coast Main Line from Carstairs to Edinburgh, a variety of CrossCountry Class 220 Voyager, Avanti West Coast Class 221 Super Voyager, Class 390 Pendolino and London North Eastern Railway Class 801s are in use, and also Class 397 on TransPennine Express services.

The line was and still is heavily used by freight, including imported coal from Ayrshire to Drax Power Station, a daily intermodal service, departmental traffic and a daily train of loaded steel to the Dalzell works at Motherwell. Freight trains normally avoid the centre of Edinburgh and the busy station complex at Waverley by using the link from here onto the Edinburgh Suburban Line at Craiglockhart Junction, which also gives access to the marshalling yard at Millerhill. There is also a crossover for access to Network Rail's Slateford Depot, which houses On Track Plant and Test Trains when they visit Edinburgh.

When first opened by the Caledonian Railway in 1848, the line here ran through to a terminus known as Lothian Road. This was subsequently replaced by a larger depot at Edinburgh Princes Street in 1870, though it was more than twenty years thereafter before the station was fully completed. What is now the main line to the Edinburgh and Glasgow Railway at Haymarket (originally known as the Duff Street Spur) was opened by the Caledonian company in 1853 and the station along with it. The Caledonian had planned to use this link to access the E&G station at Haymarket and hence run through to Waverley, but it would be another century before this actually came to pass as agreement with the E&G over running powers couldn't be reached, forcing the Caledonian to develop its own terminus instead. The spur remained disused but intact until it was finally completed and commissioned in September 1964.

All passenger services now use this line to reach Waverley, as services over the original route to Princes Street were withdrawn by British Railways on 6 September 1965. Goods traffic ended the following year and the track was then lifted. Much of the formation has been used for road improvements, though the former junction site can still be made out.

== Sources ==
- Brailsford, Martyn, ed. (December 2017) [1987]. Railway Track Diagrams 1: Scotland & Isle of Man (6th ed.). Frome: Trackmaps. ISBN 978-0-9549866-9-8.
- Butt, R. V. J. (October 1995). The Directory of Railway Stations: details every public and private passenger station, halt, platform and stopping place, past and present (1st ed.). Sparkford: Patrick Stephens Ltd. ISBN 978-1-85260-508-7. OCLC 60251199. OL 11956311M.

| Preceding station | National Rail | Following station |
|---|---|---|
| Haymarket | ScotRail; Shotts Line | Kingsknowe |
| Haymarket | ScotRail; North Berwick Line | Kingsknowe |
