= Wester Hailes railway station =

Railway station in Edinburgh, Scotland

Wester Hailes Scottish Gaelic: Hailes an Iar
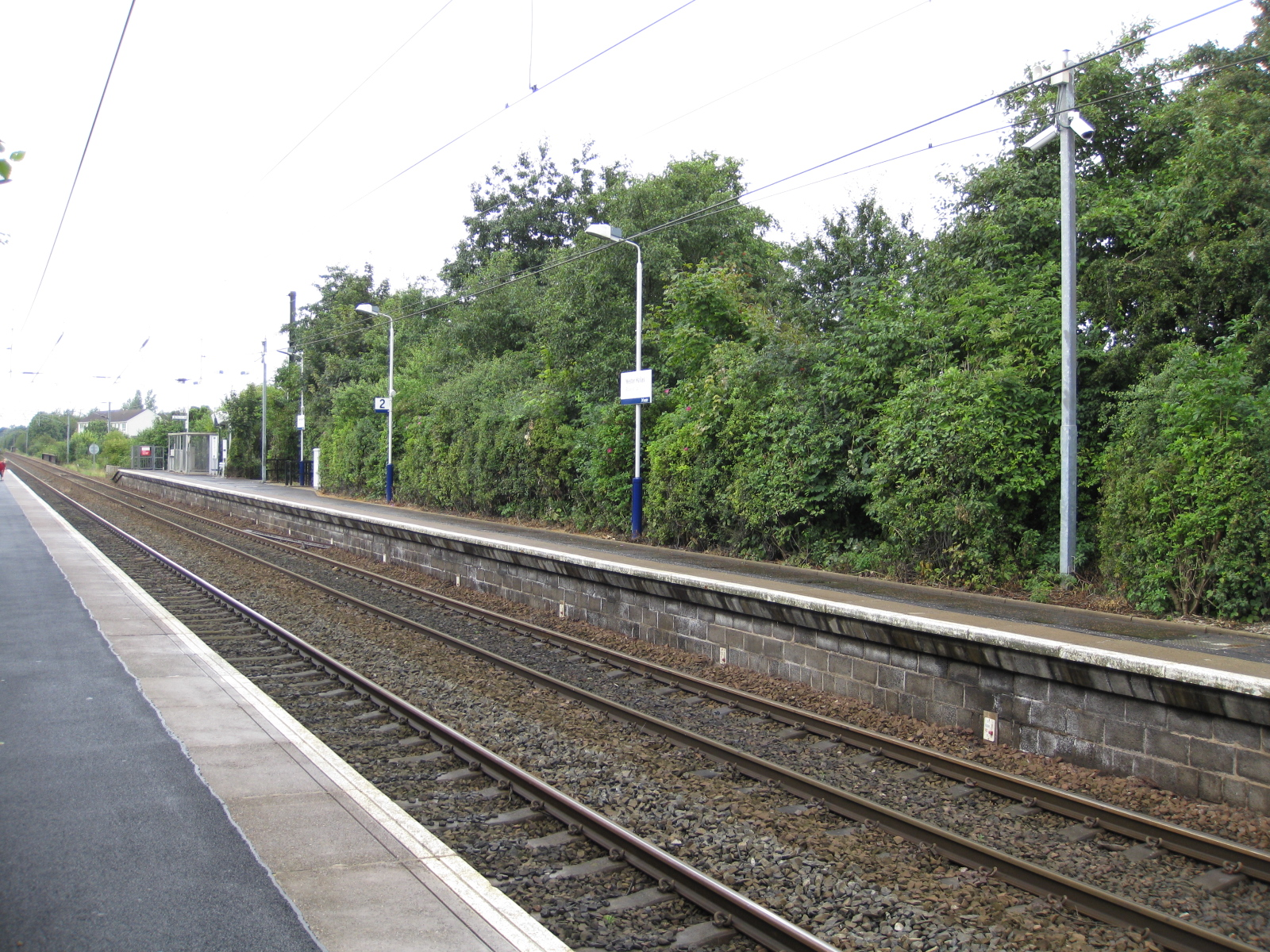
- Wester Hailes station in August 2012

General information
- Location: Wester Hailes, Edinburgh; Scotland
- Coordinates: 55.9144°N 3.2838°W
- Grid reference: NT198697
- Managed by: ScotRail
- Platforms: 2

Other information
- Station code: WTA

History
- Opened: 11 May 1987

Passengers
- 2020/21: ▼11,418
- 2021/22: ▲40,448
- 2022/23: ▼38,188
- 2023/24: ▲57,938
- 2024/25: ▲62,844
Location
Notes
- Passenger statistics from the Office of Rail and Road

Wester Hailes railway station is a railway station opened in 1987 by British Rail serving Wester Hailes in the city of Edinburgh, Scotland. It is located on the Edinburgh branch of the West Coast Main Line, but is not served by inter-city services - these are provided via the Shotts Line of the SPT network. The station has two platforms, connected by a stairway footbridge, and CCTV to deter crime and anti-social behaviour. It is managed by ScotRail.

The staple passenger traction calling at this station is the Class 156 "Super Sprinter". As this station is part of the West Coast Main Line to Carstairs, which diverges at Mid Calder Junction, a colourful variety of CrossCountry Class 220 "Voyager", Avanti West Coast Class 221 "Super Voyager", Class 390 "Pendolino" and London North Eastern Railway Class 801s can also be seen.

== Service ==
It is currently served, Monday to Saturday, by one ScotRail service every hour each way from Glasgow Central to Edinburgh Waverley. One train a day to/from Edinburgh running via Shotts starts/terminates at Motherwell (plus a second late night train from Edinburgh via Carstairs that terminates there) and there is a single a.m peak-hour service to North Berwick that returns in the evening and runs to Ayr via Carstairs and Glasgow. The latter is operated by a Class 380 Desiro EMU.

On Sundays there is a two-hourly service to Edinburgh and Glasgow (six trains each way).

| Preceding station | National Rail | Following station |
|---|---|---|
| Kingsknowe | ScotRail; Shotts Line | Curriehill |
| Kingsknowe | ScotRail; North Berwick Line | Curriehill |
