= Edwin G Lucas =

Scottish artist (1911–1990)

Edwin George Lucas
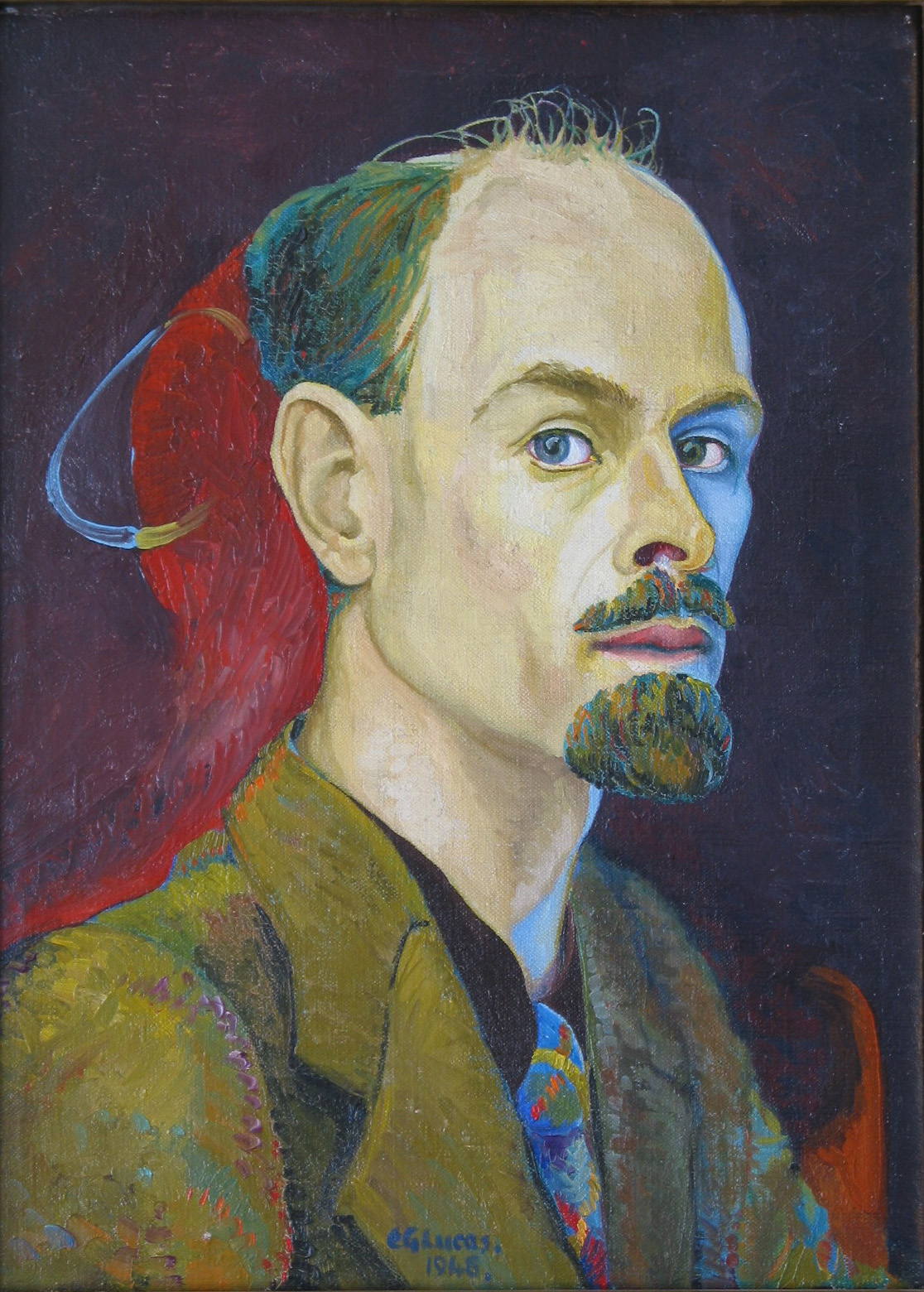
- Self Portrait, 1948
- Born: 30 March 1911; Leith
- Died: 9 December 1990 (aged 79); Edinburgh

Edwin G Lucas (30 March 1911 – 9 December 1990) was a Scottish Modernist artist. He was an amateur, self-taught apart from evening classes at Edinburgh College of Art, but during the period 1939-1952 he produced Surrealist works that are said to be unprecedented in Scottish art of the period.

His work attracted little attention from the art world at the time, but it started receiving recognition following its "discovery" in 2013 by curators of the Scottish National Gallery of Modern Art.

== Early career ==
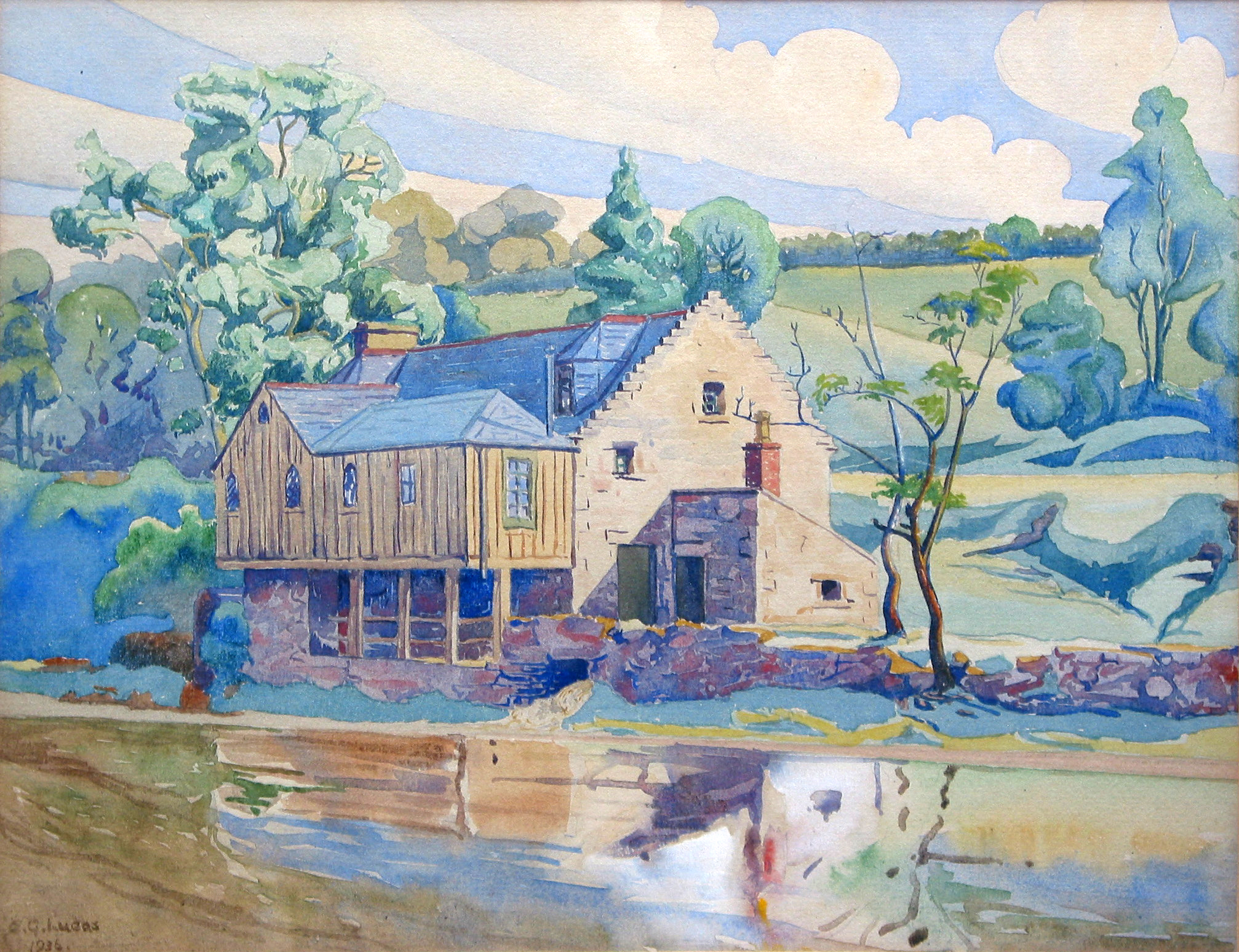
Snuff Mill, Juniper Green, 1936

Edwin George Lucas was born in Leith in 1911, and grew up in Juniper Green, a village on the outskirts of Edinburgh. He was educated at Juniper Green Primary School and then George Heriot's School.

He was interested in a career in art, but his family discouraged this because his uncle, E G Handel Lucas, who is now a well regarded Victorian artist, struggled to make a decent living and lived the latter part of his life in poverty. Instead, Edwin joined the Civil Service in Edinburgh and studied at the University of Edinburgh, graduating with a Bachelor of Law in 1934.

Throughout the 1930s he painted conventional, well executed landscapes. These were mainly watercolours, with a strong emphasis on the countryside close to the family home in Juniper Green. They were often accepted for exhibition by the Society of Scottish Artists (SSA) and the Royal Scottish Academy

One of these paintings attracted attention from the French journal La Revue Moderne des Arts et de la Vie. Its review called him "artiste extrêmement cultivé...un artiste plein de claire simplicité" (a highly educated artist...a painter of great clarity and simplicity). It also commented on his "liberté d'esprit et sa souplesse de style" (freedom of spirit and stylistic versatility), attributes that were to become defining characteristics of his later work.

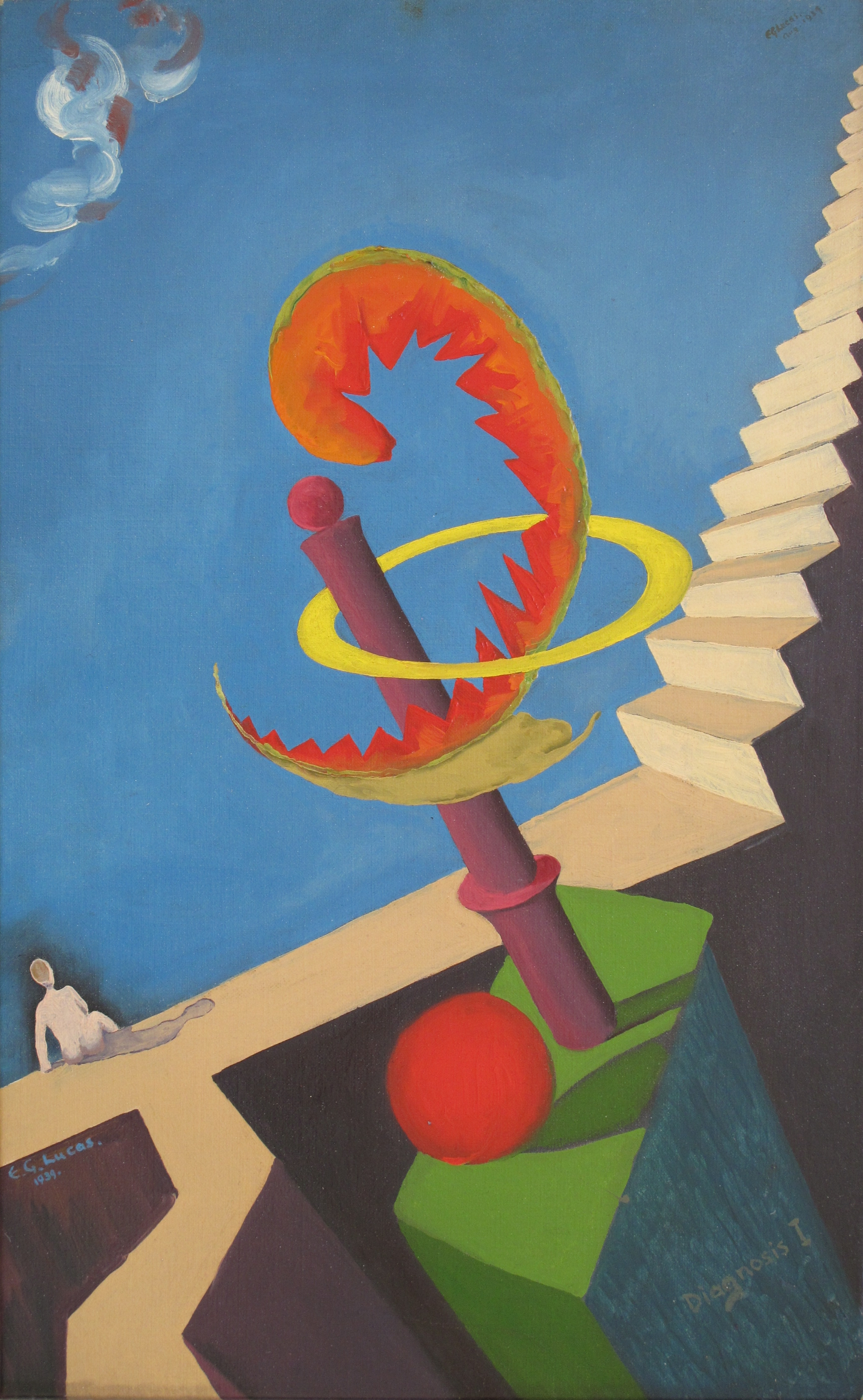
Diagnosis 1, 1939, Lucas's first Surrealist work

== Influence of Surrealism ==
Surrealist works were shown at a number of exhibitions in Edinburgh during the late 1930s. One example was the SSA exhibition in December 1937, which included the first works by Salvador Dalí, Max Ernst and Giorgio de Chirico to be shown in Edinburgh. Lucas would certainly have attended because one of his watercolours was also included. Another example was an exhibition at Gladstone's Land Galleries in June 1939 by a group of graduates of Edinburgh College of Art, including William Gear.

Gear and Lucas were both close friends of Wilhelmina Barns-Graham, from whom Lucas started renting a studio in 1939. Almost immediately he started painting Surrealist works, the first of which is dated August 1939, probably influenced by shows such as those mentioned above. He would later refer to this period as a brief "flirtation with Surrealism" but it had a great impact on his future career as he developed his own highly individual take on Surrealism and produced works that are said to be unprecedented in Scottish art of the period. His surrealist painting, Caley Station (1942), presented his own unique interpretation of the life in Edinburgh Princes Street railway station.

== Post-War work ==
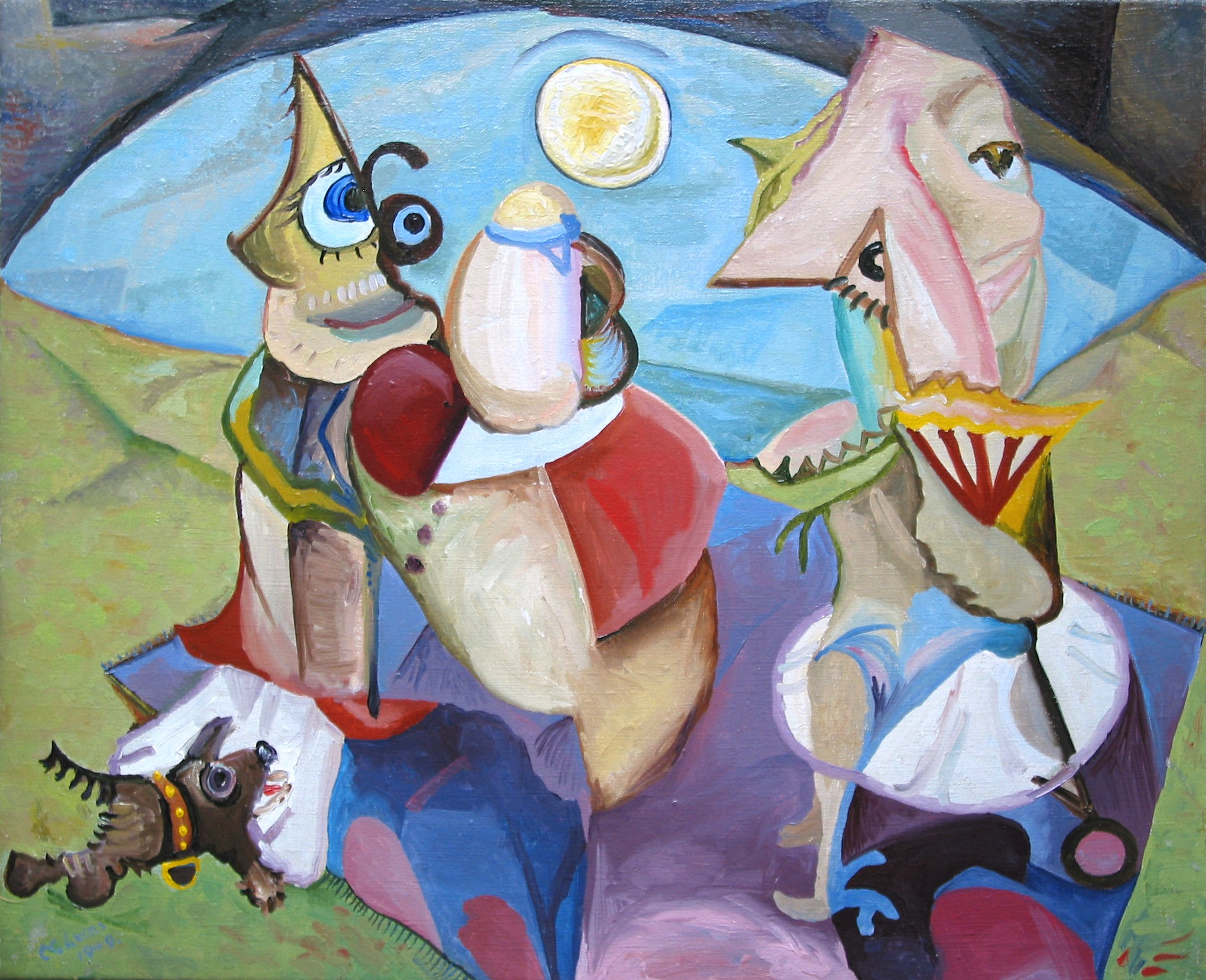
Walking the Dog, 1949

Lucas was a committed pacifist and as a conscientious objector he worked in hospitals at Killearn and Raigmore during the war. He returned to Edinburgh in 1944 and the immediate post-war years were a very creative and prolific time for him. He returned to work as a Civil Servant, in the Estate Duty Office, but also attended evening classes at Edinburgh College of Art and saw himself as a serious painter who had a day job.

Patrick Elliott, senior curator at the Scottish National Gallery of Modern Art, described the purchase in 2013 of some of Lucas's works of this period as follows:

They are impressive because they are inexplicable, I've not seen anything quite like them before in my 20 years at the Gallery of Modern Art: there's a bit of Picasso, but overall he's got nothing in common with anyone painting in Scotland at the time - or in fact anywhere else.

However, at the time they were painted Lucas's innovative works had little appeal to the Edinburgh art world. Unlike his landscapes, they were generally not accepted for exhibition. Lucas proceeded to hold solo shows at the New Gallery in Shandwick Place, Edinburgh, in 1950 and 1951 but these received little attention from the art establishment.

== Later life ==
Lucas married Marjorie Eileen McCulloch in 1952. They bought a house in Ann Street in Stockbridge, Edinburgh and had two sons, born in 1953 and 1957. He stopped painting after his marriage, except for a period in the 1980s. His painting was ended by deteriorating eyesight and he died of leukaemia in 1990.

== Posthumous recognition ==
In 2009 his family started renting gallery space in Edinburgh to hold occasional exhibitions, but his work remained almost completely unknown until a letter to the Scottish National Gallery of Modern Art led to five paintings being acquired. They were hung beside works by Picasso and Miró in the "New Acquisitions" exhibition from October 2013 to May 2014.

A number of newspapers published stories about the discovery of this "lost Surrealist", including The Daily Telegraph, The Times, The Herald (Glasgow) and the Edinburgh Evening News.

Subsequently, the City Art Centre in Edinburgh showed some of Lucas's work in two mixed exhibitions: "A Capital View - the Art of Edinburgh" and "Jagged Generation: William Gear’s Contemporaries and Influences". Also, two exhibitions devoted to his work were held at the Fine Art Society, and his work was represented in "A New Era: Scottish Modern Art 1900-1950" at the Scottish National Gallery of Modern Art.

Recognition increased further with a high-profile solo exhibition "Edwin G. Lucas: An Individual Eye" at the City Art Centre in Edinburgh from August 2018 to February 2019. That exhibition then travelled to England and was shown at the Beecroft Art Gallery in Southend-on-Sea from June to September 2023.

In Juniper Green, the old building of the primary school he attended was redeveloped into flats in the early 2010s and the street created around it was named Lucas Gardens in his memory.
