= Kingsknowe railway station =

Railway station in Edinburgh, Scotland

Kingsknowe Scottish Gaelic: Cnoc an Rìgh
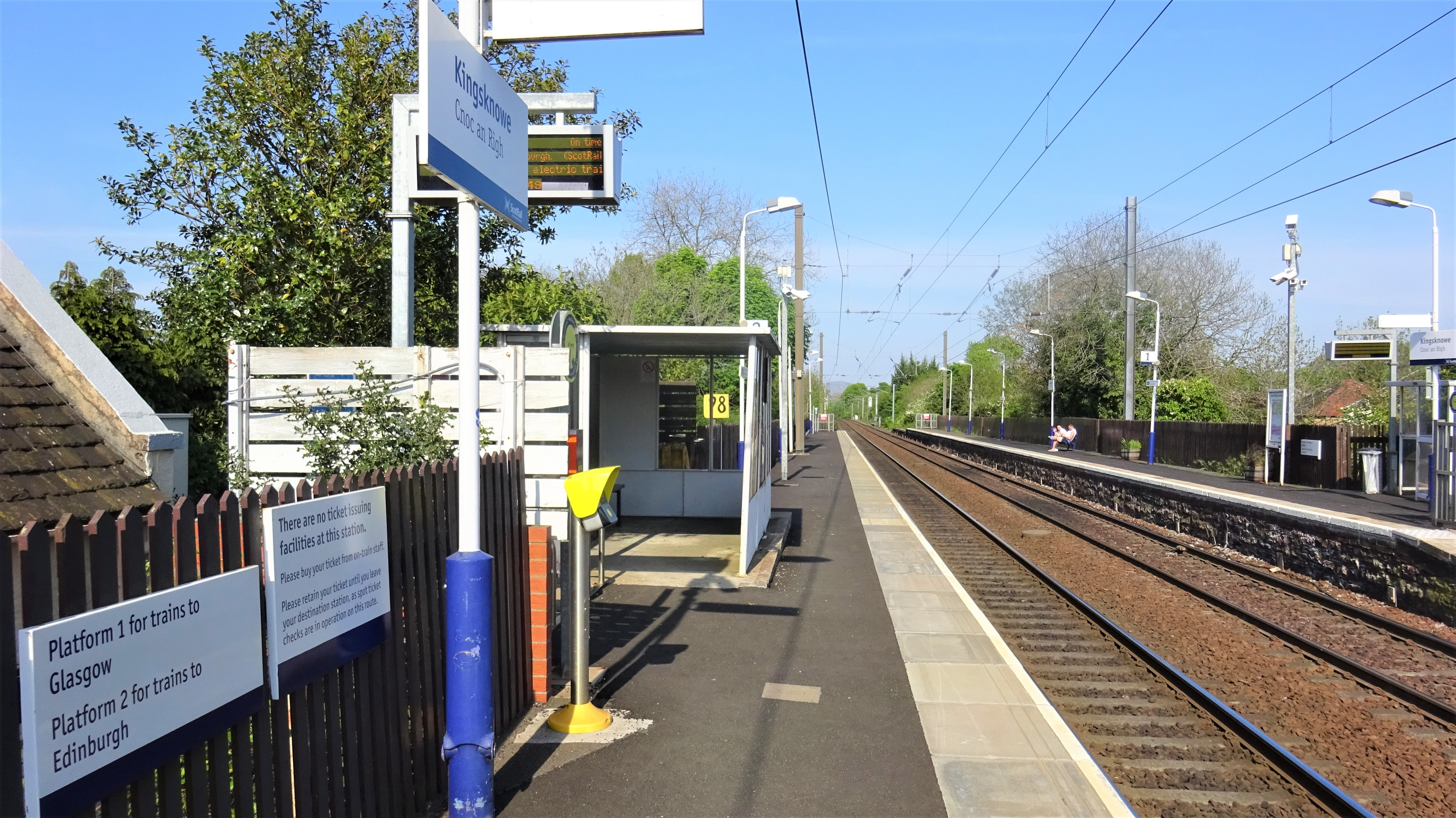

General information
- Location: Kingsknowe, Edinburgh; Scotland
- Coordinates: 55.9190°N 3.2642°W
- Grid reference: NT210702
- Manager: ScotRail
- Platforms: 2

Other information
- Station code: KGE

History
- Original company: Caledonian Railway

Key dates
- 15 February 1848: Opened as King's Knowe or Slateford
- January 1853: Renamed to Kingsknowe
- 1 January 1917: Closed
- 1 February 1919: Reopened
- 6 July 1964: Closed
- 1 February 1971: Reopened

Passengers
- 2021/22: ▲11,214
- 2022/23: ▲20,304
- 2023/24: ▲33,176
- 2024/25: ▲34,444
- 2025/26: ▲42,270
Location
Notes
- Passenger statistics from the Office of Rail and Road

Kingsknowe railway station is a railway station serving Kingsknowe in the Scottish city of Edinburgh. It is located on the Shotts Line from Glasgow Central to Edinburgh Waverley via Shotts. The station has two platforms, connected by a level crossing, and CCTV. It is managed by ScotRail.

== History ==
Kingsknowe station was opened by the Caledonian Railway on 15 February 1848. It was closed to passenger services by British Railways on 6 July 1964 and reopened on 1 February 1971.

== Services ==
It is currently served, Mondays to Saturdays, by one ScotRail service each hour from Glasgow Central to Edinburgh Waverley. Two trains a day from Edinburgh terminate at Motherwell (one also starts back from there in the early morning) and there is one through train in each direction between Glasgow and North Berwick that calls (peak periods only - runs via Carstairs, with the evening train extended to Ayr).

There is a two-hourly Sunday service at this station to Edinburgh and through to Glasgow since the December 2012 timetable change - prior to this, trains had only run as far as West Calder.

Preceding station	National Rail	Following station
Slateford	ScotRail; Shotts Line	Wester Hailes
Slateford	ScotRail; North Berwick Line	Wester Hailes

== Sources ==
- Brailsford, Martyn, ed. (December 2017) [1987]. Railway Track Diagrams 1: Scotland & Isle of Man (6th ed.). Frome: Trackmaps. ISBN 978-0-9549866-9-8.
- Butt, R. V. J. (October 1995). The Directory of Railway Stations: details every public and private passenger station, halt, platform and stopping place, past and present (1st ed.). Sparkford: Patrick Stephens Ltd. ISBN 978-1-85260-508-7. OCLC 60251199. OL 11956311M.
