= Kingsknowe =

Suburb of Edinburgh, Scotland

Coordinates: 55°55′03″N 3°15′45″W

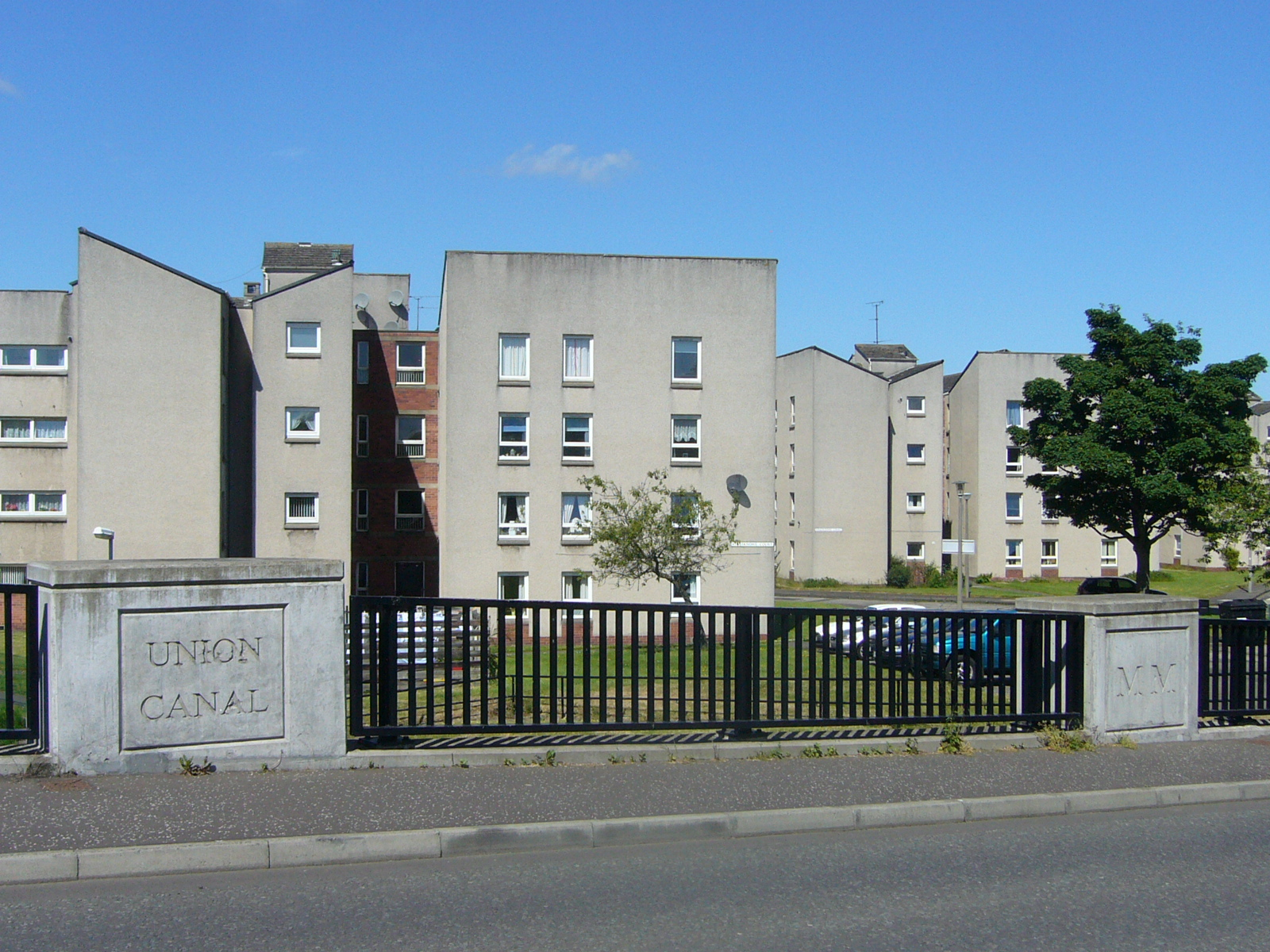
- 1960s social housing, Kingsknowe

- Location within the City of Edinburgh council area Location within Scotland
- OS grid reference: NT210699
- Council area: City of Edinburgh
- Lieutenancy area: Edinburgh
- Country: Scotland
- Sovereign state: United Kingdom
- Post town: EDINBURGH
- Postcode district: EH14
- Dialling code: 0131
- Police: Scotland
- Fire: Scottish
- Ambulance: Scottish
- UK Parliament: Edinburgh South West
- Scottish Parliament: Edinburgh Pentlands

Kingsknowe (kingz-NOW, /ˌkɪŋzˈnaʊ/; Scottish Gaelic: Cnocan an Righ) is a suburb of Edinburgh the capital of Scotland. It is south-west of Craiglockhart, and borders Wester Hailes, Slateford and Longstone.

== History ==
Knowe is Scots for knoll, a small hillock. The Kings part of the name is not derived from a royal connection but takes its name from a local 17th century farm owner, William King. By 1964, the farm had been demolished to make way for a new housing estate in the area.

There are several listed buildings in Kingsknowe. These include the Category B listed Millbank house, an 18th-century rubble-built building on the corner of Bank Road and Boag's Mill Road. Numbers 4, 8 and 10 Redhall Bank Road are Category B listed cottages that were built by Sir James Gowans circa 1850.

== Transport ==
The area is served by Kingsknowe railway station which is part of the Edinburgh Waverley railway station to Glasgow Central station railway link. The railway station opened on 15 February 1848 but was known as Longstone. The station was subsequently renamed as Kingsknowe in 1853. While the station closed on 6 July 1964, demand saw it reopen on 1 February 1971.

The Union Canal passes to the north of Kingsknowe, forming the boundary with neighbouring Longstone. There is a footbridge over the canal that previously carried the branch Balerno line over the canal.

== Community Facilities ==
Kingsknowe Golf Club is an 18-hole golf course in Kingsknowe that was founded in 1908.

Kingsknowe playing fields are home to Currie Star F.C., a local football club established in 1997. There are three pitches available to the public, a large open green and a pavilion building.
