= Otto Pfenninger =

Swiss photographer (1855–1929)

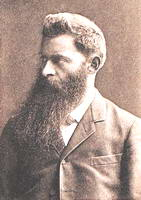
- Born: 5 April 1855
- Died: 20 March 1929 (aged 73); Mitcham, Surrey, England
- Known for: Photography

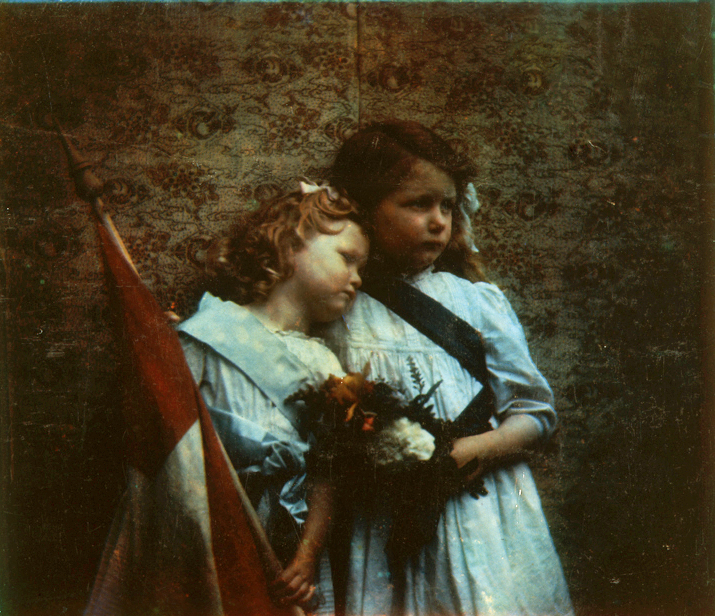
Colour photograph taken by Pfenninger in Brighton and registered for copyright in 1910

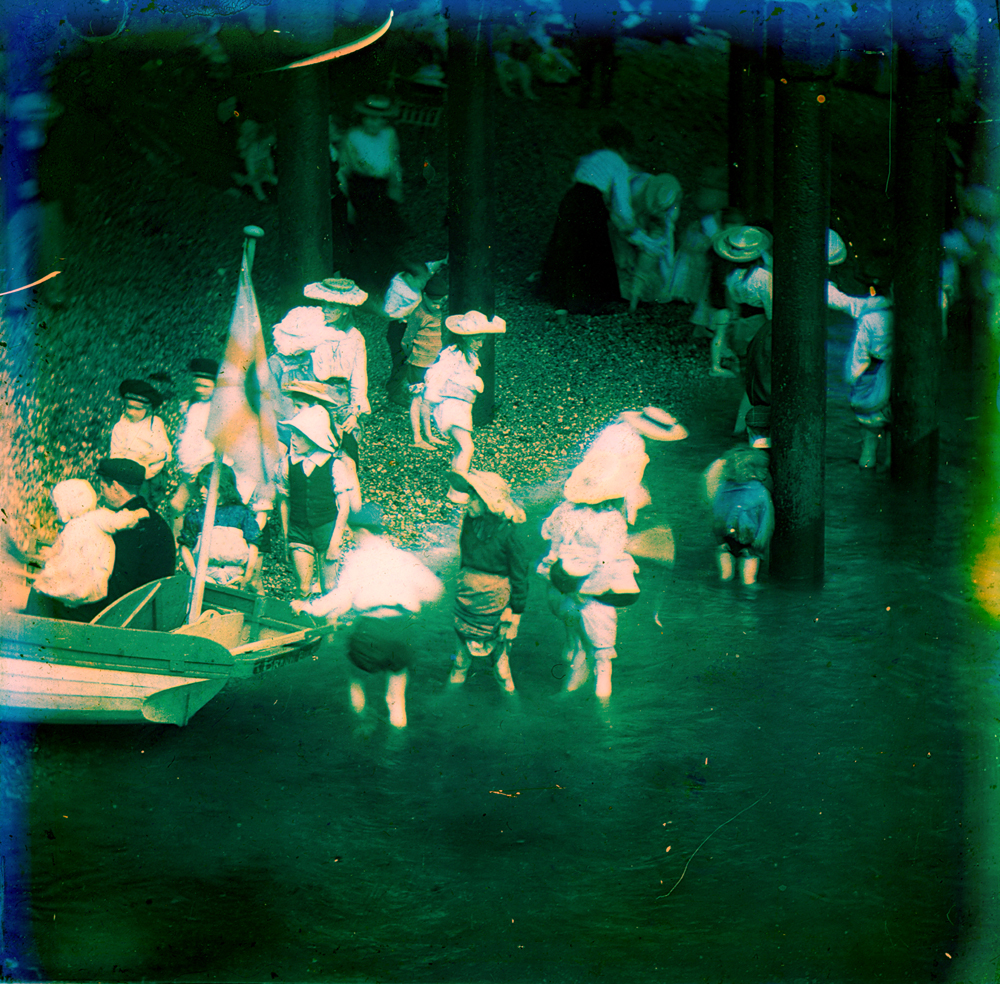
Three colour lantern slide of children playing on a Brighton beach 6 August 1906

Otto Pfenninger (5 April 1855 – 20 March 1929) was a Swiss photographer. He was a founding member of the Swiss Photographers Association (1886) and a pioneer of colour photography. He moved to Brighton, England where he developed his career as a photographer.

In 1906, Pfenninger built a special camera to his own design using 3-colour separated plates from which full-colour photographic images could be created. That summer Pfenninger used this tri-colour, single exposure camera to create some of the first colour photographs, using the parks and beaches of Brighton as scenes. His camera was based upon J.W. Bennetto's one-shot camera of 1897 in which three separation negatives were obtained at a single exposure. Pfenninger tried to use the same system but found that the refracted image was shorter from top to bottom, his solution was to add a glass plate at the same angle, but opposite direction, to the Bennetto reflector.

In 1921, under the pseudonym O. Reg, he wrote Byepaths of Colour Photography in which he discusses in technical detail, the history and theory of developments in subtractive colour photography.
