= Slateford =

Area of Edinburgh, Scotland

Coordinates: 55°55′41.16″N 3°14′30.03″W

Slateford: Scottish Gaelic: Àth na Sglèata
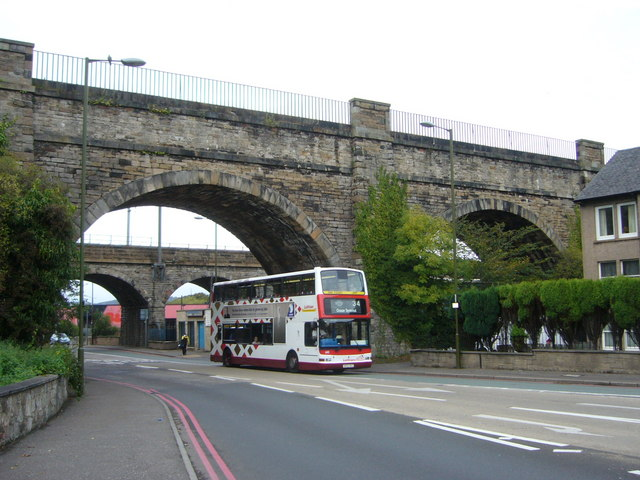
- Slateford Aqueduct

- Location within the City of Edinburgh council area Location within Scotland
- OS grid reference: NT219706
- Council area: City of Edinburgh
- Lieutenancy area: Edinburgh
- Country: Scotland
- Sovereign state: United Kingdom
- Post town: EDINBURGH
- Postcode district: EH14
- Dialling code: 0131
- Police: Scotland
- Fire: Scottish
- Ambulance: Scottish
- UK Parliament: Edinburgh South West
- Scottish Parliament: Edinburgh Southern

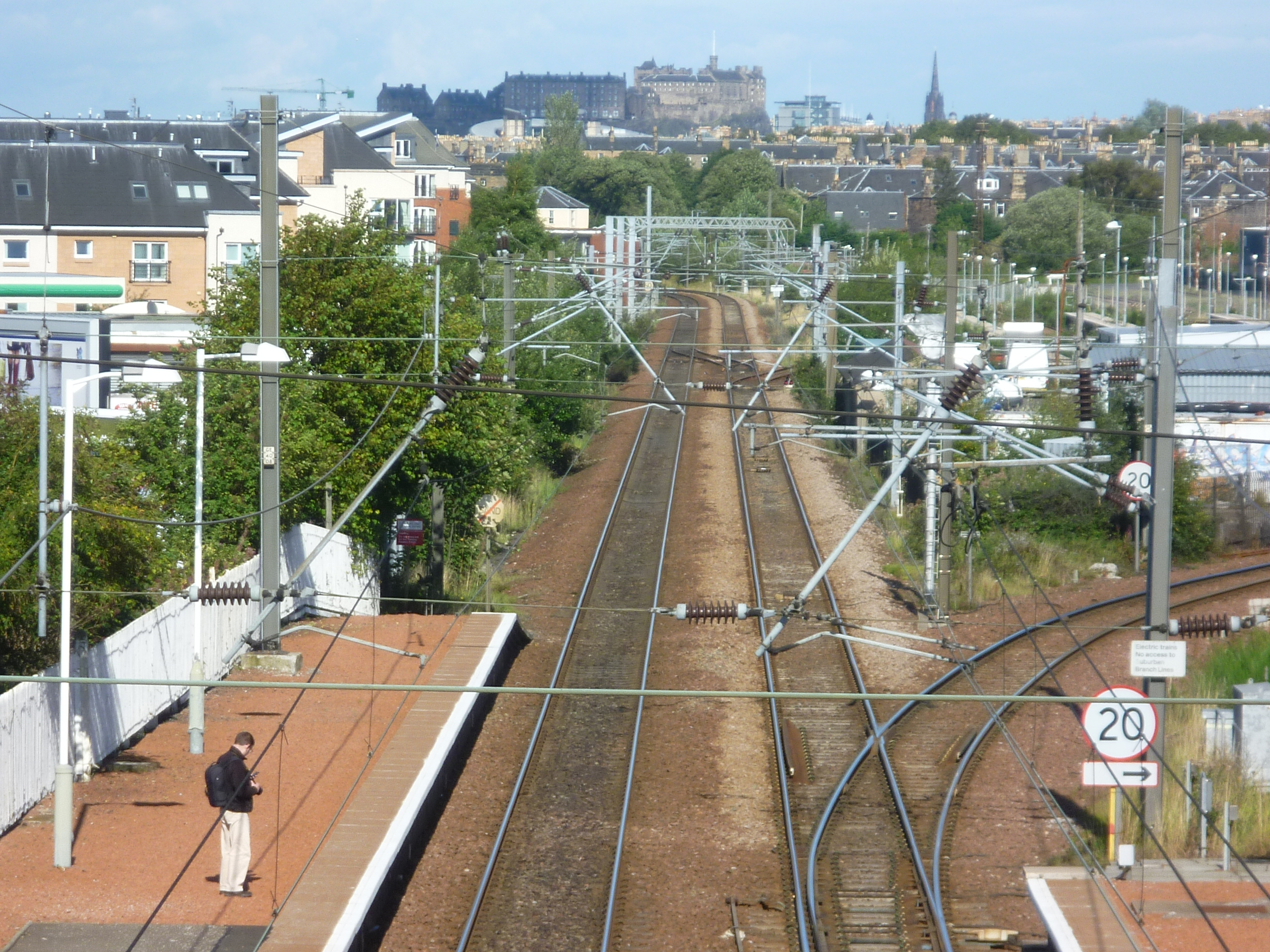
Slateford station

Slateford (Scottish Gaelic: Àth na Sglèata) is an area of Edinburgh, the capital of Scotland. It is east of the Water of Leith.

The former village of Slateford lies on the Lanark Road where it crosses the Water of Leith, 1/4 mile (400 m) south west of Slateford Station. The name "Slateford" comes from local rock found in the area and the old fording point on the Water of Leith that the village grew round. In 1882 it had a post office with money order savings bank and telegraph departments, a police station, a Good Templars Hall, School, U.P. Church and the extensive bleachfields of Inglis Green. The village was crossed by the Union Canal Slateford Aqueduct in 1822 and a few years later the 14-arch viaduct carrying the Caledonian railway line. The situe of the Canal, Road and Rail bridges capture all three modes of transport together still to this day. In 1952 and later in 1967 major road widening projects removed all but a few of the original cottages, though Slateford House, School (Now the headquarters and visitor centre for the Water of Leith conservation trust), and Church (used as a warehouse) still stand today.

Slateford is home to the first car-free housing development in the UK, Slateford Green.

== Rail transport ==
Slateford railway station is served by hourly trains to Edinburgh Waverley to the east and Shotts and Glasgow Central to the west. Certain Peak journeys run to and from North Berwick.

== Bus transport ==
Lothian Buses operate six routes to the area:

- 4 Hillend – Oxgangs – Slateford Station – Haymarket – Princes Street – Meadowbank – Northfield – Bingham – The Jewel - Queen Margaret Uni
- 34 Riccarton – Sighthill – Longstone – Slateford Station – Fountainbridge – Princes Street – Lochend – Leith – Ocean Terminal
- 35 Riccarton - Sighthill – Chesser – Fountainbridge – Canongate – Easter Road - Leith – Ocean Terminal
- 36 Gyle Centre - Hermiston Gait - Sighthill - Longstone - Craiglockhart - Morningside - Tollcross - Bonnington - Leith - Ocean Terminal
- 44 Balerno – Currie - Slateford Station – Haymarket – Princes Street – Meadowbank – Willowbrae - Brunstane – Musselburgh – Wallyford
- N44 Balerno – Currie - Slateford Station – Haymarket – Princes Street – Elm Row

McGill's Scotland East operates one service to the area

- 20 ASDA Chesser – Longstone – Kingsknowe – Wester Hailes – The Calders – Bankhead – Hermiston Gait – Edinburgh Park – Gyle Centre - Ratho

== Notable people ==
- George Farm – former Scotland, Blackpool and Queen of the South F.C. goalkeeper and Scottish Cup winning manager with Dunfermline Athletic.
- Sir Chris Hoy – Olympic gold medal-winning cyclist, grew up in Slateford.
