= Cupples =

Cupples may refer to:

- Anne Cupples (1839–1896), Scottish children's book writer
- Claire Cupples, Canadian microbiologist
- George Cupples (1822–1891), Scottish maritime novelist
- Jimmy Cupples, contestant on the first series of the Australian version of The Voice
- Samuel Cupples (1831–1912), American woodenware merchant
- L. Adrienne Cupples American epidemiologist
