= Dalry, Edinburgh =

Area of Edinburgh, Scotland

Coordinates: 55°56′36.85″N 3°13′10.52″W

Dalry
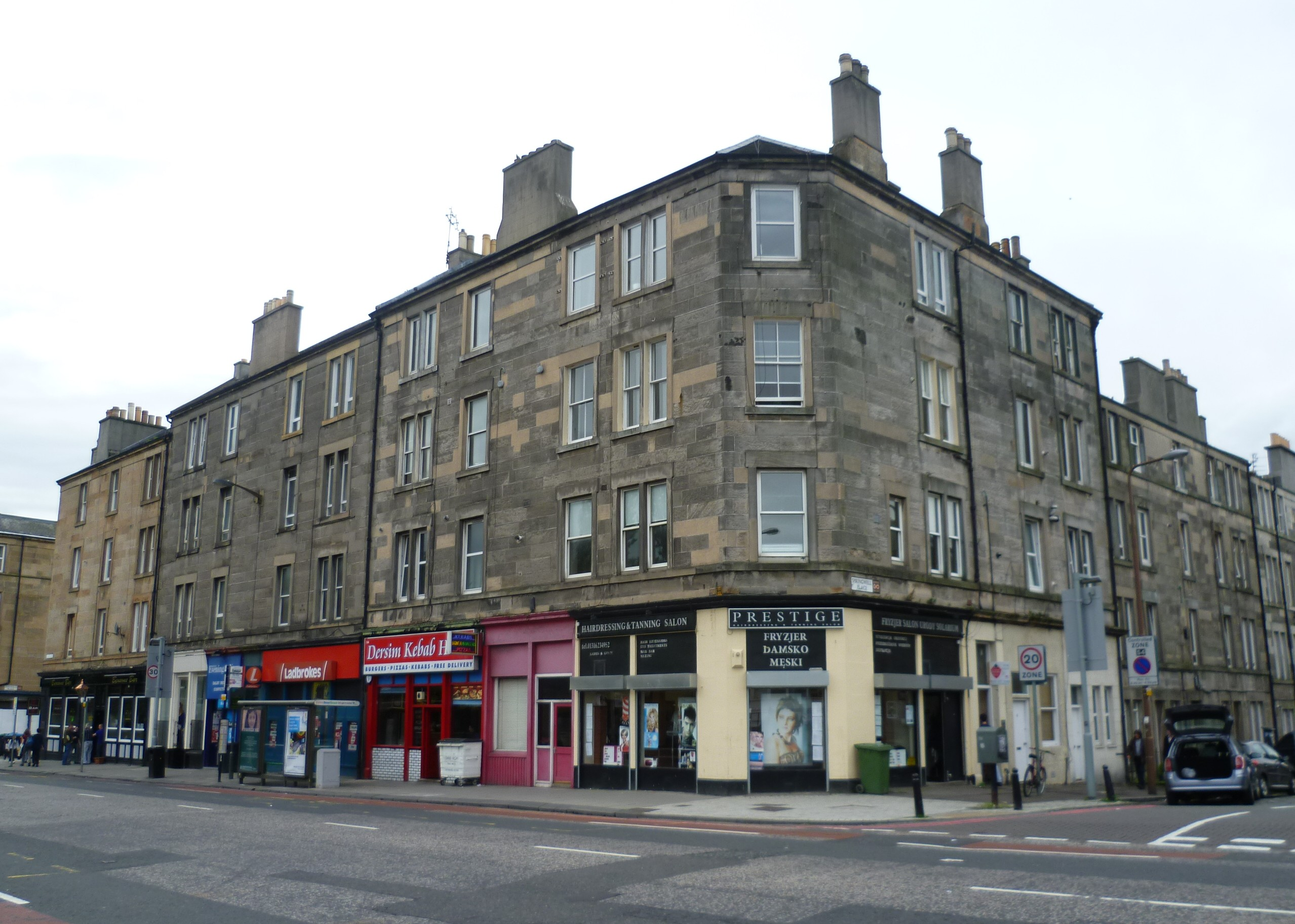
- Dalry Road

- Location within the City of Edinburgh council area Location within Scotland
- Population: Unknown
- Council area: City of Edinburgh
- Country: Scotland
- Sovereign state: United Kingdom
- Post town: Edinburgh
- Postcode district: EH11
- Police: Scotland
- Fire: Scottish
- Ambulance: Scottish
- UK Parliament: Edinburgh South West
- Scottish Parliament: Edinburgh Central

Dalry (/dælˈraɪ/) is an area of the Scottish capital city of Edinburgh. It is located close to the city centre, between Haymarket and Gorgie. The area is now primarily residential. It is centred around Dalry Road, which has numerous shops, restaurants and small businesses. Lying outside the old city walls and west of the castle, the area began as part of the agricultural estate of Dalry House (constructed in 1661), the exception being the Dalry Mill, recorded as the oldest paper mill in Scotland, now demolished.

In the Victorian period industrial development followed along with large scale tenement construction, new road layouts and the addition of railway infrastructure, all of which came to occupy the former fields. By the early 21st century most of the industry of Dalry has disappeared, with the former sites converted to private housing.

== Etymology ==
The name Dalry may derive from Dail Ruigh or Dail Rìgh, Scottish Gaelic for the "Place of the Fields" or "King's Field" respectively. "Dail Fhraoich" meaning "Field of the heather" has also been suggested as a derivation ("Fh" is silent).

== Location ==
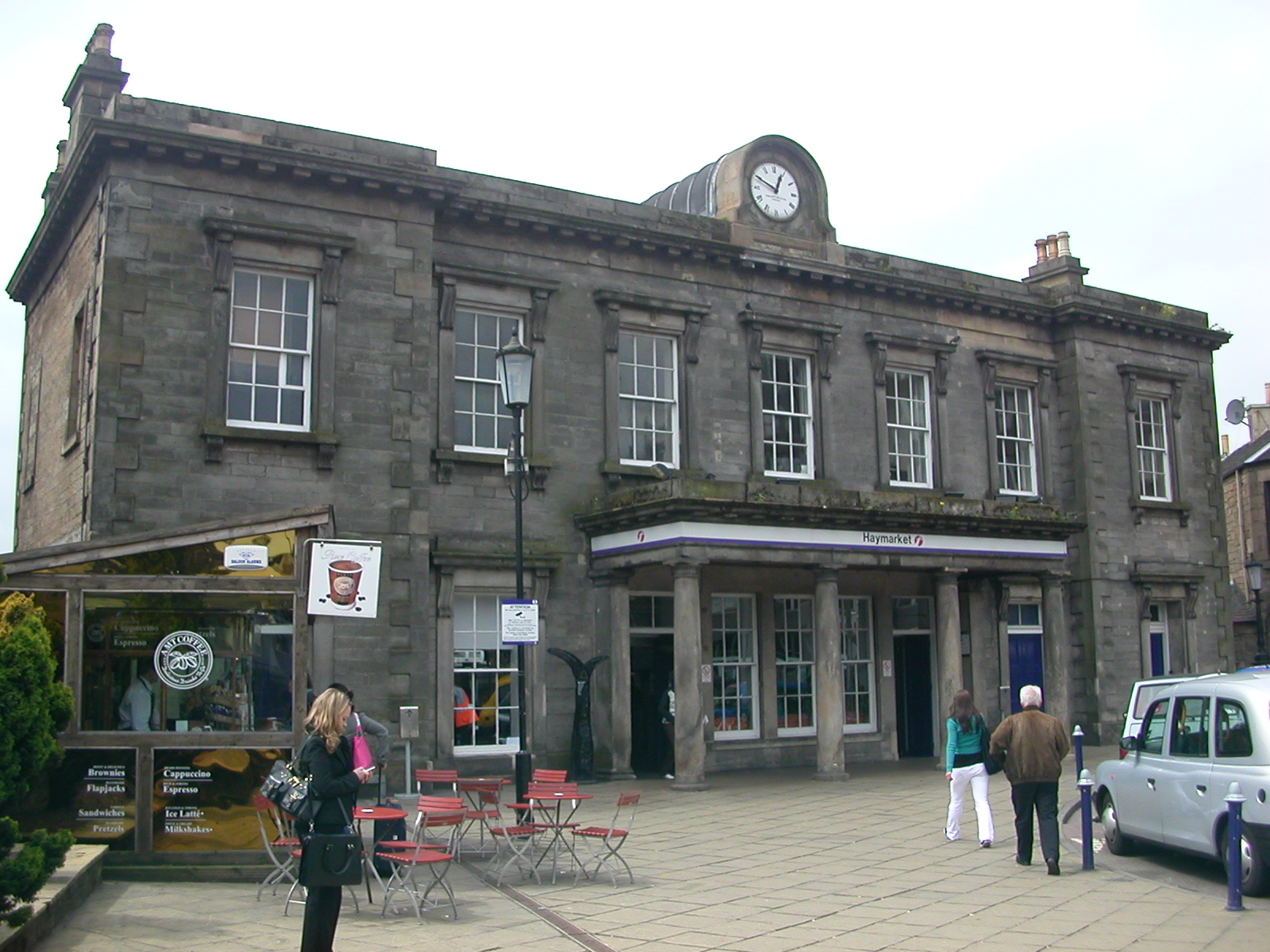
Haymarket railway station is the main line railway station serving the area and marks the northern boundary of Dalry.

Dalry is centred on Dalry Road, which, at Haymarket, is the beginning of the A70 road. The area is often mentioned along with the neighbouring area of Gorgie to the southwest, and the joint name Gorgie-Dalry is commonly used by the City of Edinburgh Council.

The West Approach Road with the area of Fountainbridge beyond marks the south-eastern boundary of Dalry. Fountainbridge is accessed via the Telfer Subway, which passes underneath the West Approach Road. The subway was built in the mid-19th century to provide access between Dalry and Fountainbridge under the Caledonian Railway main line but it remained as a primary pedestrian route following the replacement of the railway by the West Approach Road in the 1970s.

Dalry also borders the areas of Ardmillan to the south, Roseburn to the north-west and Haymarket to the north. Dalry has a range of shops, restaurants and leisure facilities. Princes Street, in central Edinburgh, is ten to fifteen minutes' walk from the area. Many of Edinburgh's major employers are also within walking distance. The nearest railway station is Haymarket railway station, which is located directly adjacent to the northern boundary of Dalry.

== History and architecture ==
=== Early history ===
Dalry is first recorded around 1328 when, together with Merchiston, it was owned by William Bisset. Dalry Mill was located on these lands and is stated to have existed in various forms from at least 1478 to sometime in the mid-18th century. When owned by Mungo Russell in 1590, the mill was engaged in paper production, and is the first paper mill recorded to exist in Scotland. The paper mill produced 'white writing and printing papers' for the nearby city centre printing and publishing. Today it would be considered to be in the Roseburn area rather than Dalry.

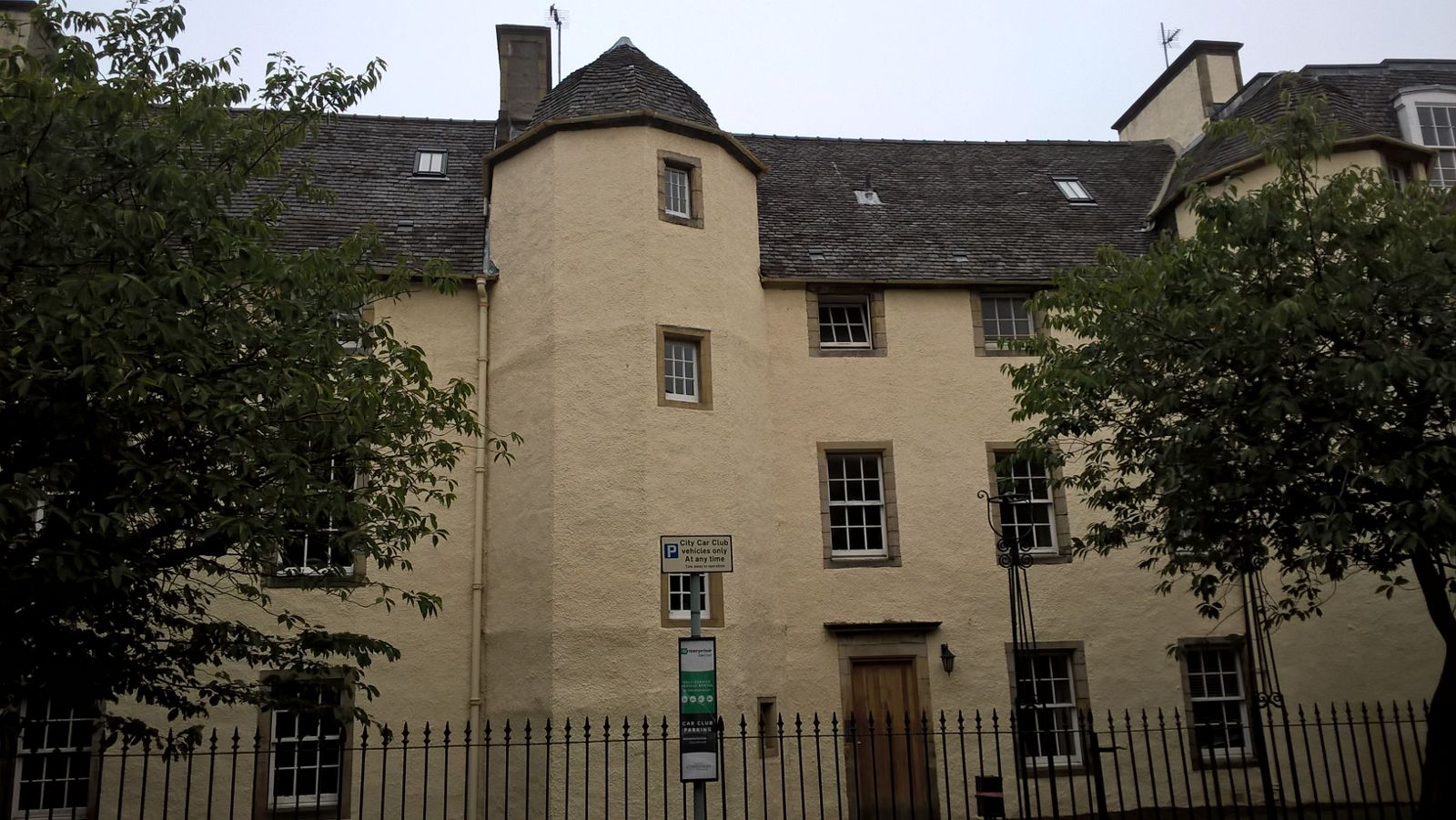
Dalry House is the oldest building in Dalry, built in 1661.

With the exception of the mill the area was primarily agricultural land, lying outside the Old Town of Edinburgh. The former mansion house, Dalry House, built about 1661 still exists. The house, once set in extensive grounds, is now surrounded by tenements and is located on Orwell Place. It was built probably for and later owned and occupied by the Chiesley family. The house was reputedly haunted by a member of the family called John Chiesley. John Chiesley, the local landowner was married to Margaret Nicholson. The marriage was said to be unhappy (although it gave children including Rachel Chiesley, Lady Grange) and Margaret took her husband to court for aliment. She was awarded 1,700 merks by Sir George Lockhart of Carnwath, the Lord President of the Court of Session. Furious with the result, John Chiesley shot the judge, Lockhart, dead near his home in Old Bank Close off the Lawnmarket as he walked home from church on Easter Sunday, 31 March 1689. Chiesley made no attempt to escape and confessed at his trial, held before the Lord Provost the next day. Two days later he was taken from the Tolbooth to the Mercat Cross on the High Street. His right hand was cut off before he was hanged, and the pistol he had used for the murder was placed round his neck. According to Robert Chambers writing in 1824, "The body was stolen from the gallows, as was supposed, by his friends, and it was never known what had become of it, till more than a century after, when, in removing the hearth-stone of a cottage in Dalry Park, near Edinburgh, a human skeleton was found, with the remains of a pistol near the situation of the neck. No doubt was entertained that these were the remains of Chiesly". Later investigation held this to be the body of John Chiesley (known colloquially as 'Johnny One-Arm').

Five years later in 1694, Robert Chieslie, John's brother, served as Lord Provost of Edinburgh.

Dalry House and the surrounding lands passed to the Walker family between 1790 and 1812. In 1870 the house was sold to the Scottish Episcopal Church and from the late 19th century to about 1960 it was used as a teacher training college and by the Edinburgh & Leith Old People's Welfare Committee for social activities, classes and a lunch club until closed down in 2002. The actor Alastair Sim taught at the college between 1922 and 1924. The house was then renovated and converted into private flats in the early 21st century.

=== 19th century to present day ===
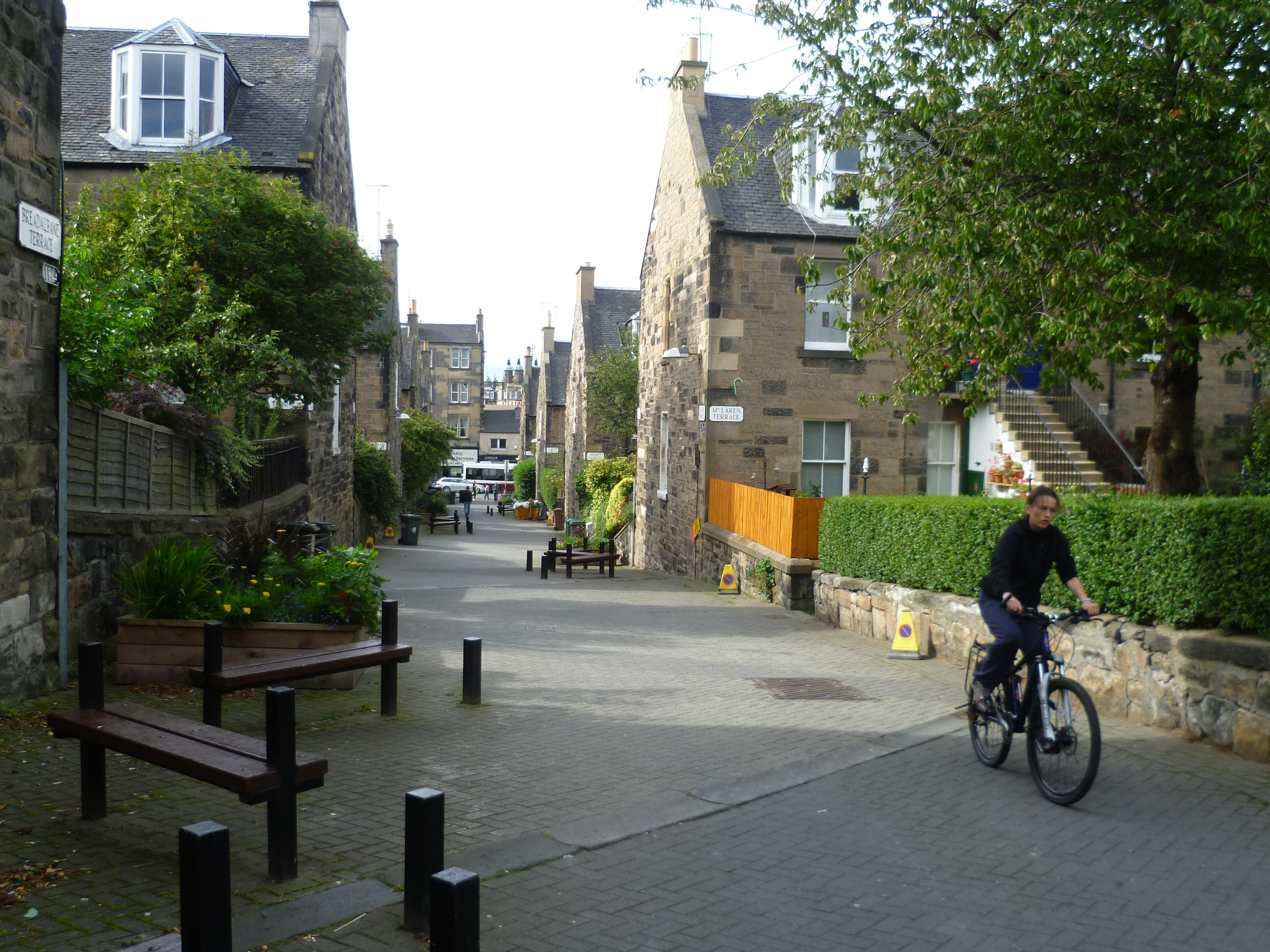
The Dalry 'colonies' are a series of terraced houses located in the north of Dalry.

Dalry was intensively developed in the 19th century and contains a mix of traditional tenements, "colonies" (terraced houses where one floor has an entrance at one side, and the other floor has an entrance on the other side; street names follow the buildings rather than the roads between them). The Dalry Colonies are accessed from Dalry Place off the east end of Dalry Road and comprise eight streets: Lewis Terrace, Walker Terrace, Douglas Terrace, Cobden Terrace, Argyll Terrace, Bright Terrace, Atholl Terrace and McLaren Terrace and Breadalbane Terrace. Four of the streets are named after politicians, prominent in the Anti-Corn Law League; Richard Cobden, Duncan McLaren, John Bright and Samuel Walker. Another was named for Bailie David Lewis (editor of the Edinburgh-based weekly Reformer publication). and the other three names are places in Scotland. The colonies in Dalry were built between 1868 and 1870 by the Edinburgh Cooperative Building Company Limited, primarily to house Caledonian Railway workers. The Dalry Colonies are Category B Listed buildings.

The growth of industrial buildings, in proximity to the railway development of the time created new jobs in Dalry. These included employment with the railways themselves, as well as at the Fountain Brewery, the Caledonian Distillery, the North British Rubber Company's Castle Mill (1856) and the Grove Street Biscuit Factory (1868). This led to a surge in requirements for new residential development, leading to a significant boom in tenement housing building in the late 19th century mainly by the Scottish businessman and baronet Sir James Steel. Steel purchased and developed three main parcels of land; the Caledonian, the Downfield and the Murieston developments, all built by 1887. Sir James Steel's nephews, James Steel Allan (1850 - 1927), Alexander Allan (1866 - 1938) and Hugh Percival (1854 - 1912) built the tenements that front the Gorgie-Dalry roads between the years 1888 and 1902 with James Steel Allan contributing the most with thirty-six building stances followed by his brother, Alexander's contribution of sixteen plots.

In the Victorian and Edwardian periods a number of local landmarks were constructed, some of which remain today. Dalry for example has one of Edinburgh's Victorian swimming baths, now known as Dalry Swim Centre, in Caledonian Crescent. The swimming pool opened in 1897. The area also used to have Edinburgh's oldest and Scotland's second oldest purpose-built cinema which opened in December, 1912 as 'The Haymarket Cinema', located at 90 Dalry Road and changed to the 'Scotia' in 1949. Only the foyer remains as a tattoo parlour (itself closed since 2016) and the main auditorium was demolished in 2013.

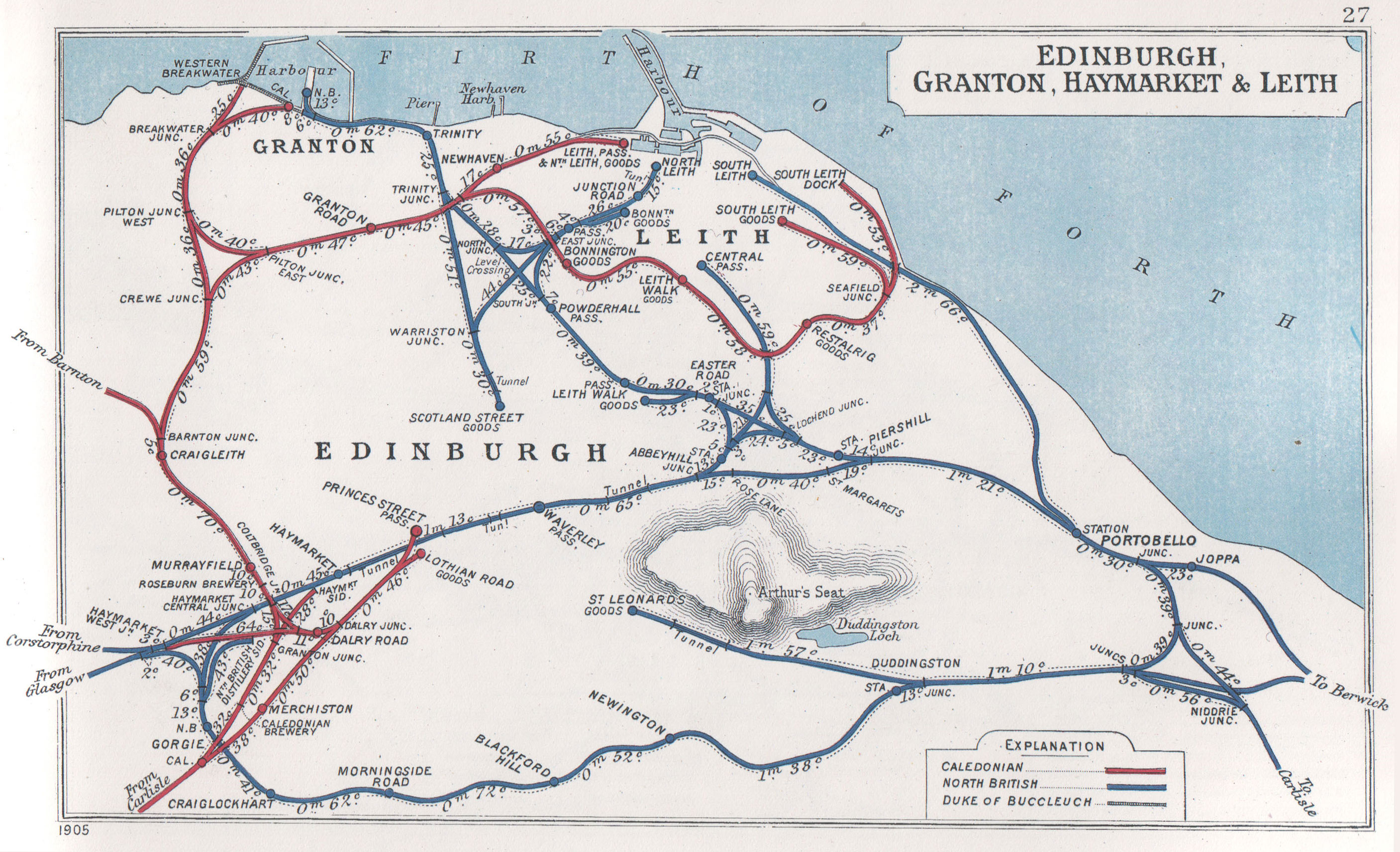
A 1905 Railway Clearing House diagram of Edinburgh railways showing Dalry Road and Dalry Junction stops

The north east of Dalry has seen major development including a former railway depot at Haymarket, which lay predominantly empty since its closure in the 1960s. The site was amongst those on the shortlist of potential locations for the Scottish Parliament Building. Construction of a new £200m retail, hotel and office development commenced in 2013 with work to reinforce the active rail tunnels under the site, which run east from Haymarket station to Edinburgh Waverley. Ground level construction commenced in May 2016, with the development scheduled to be completed by 2018.

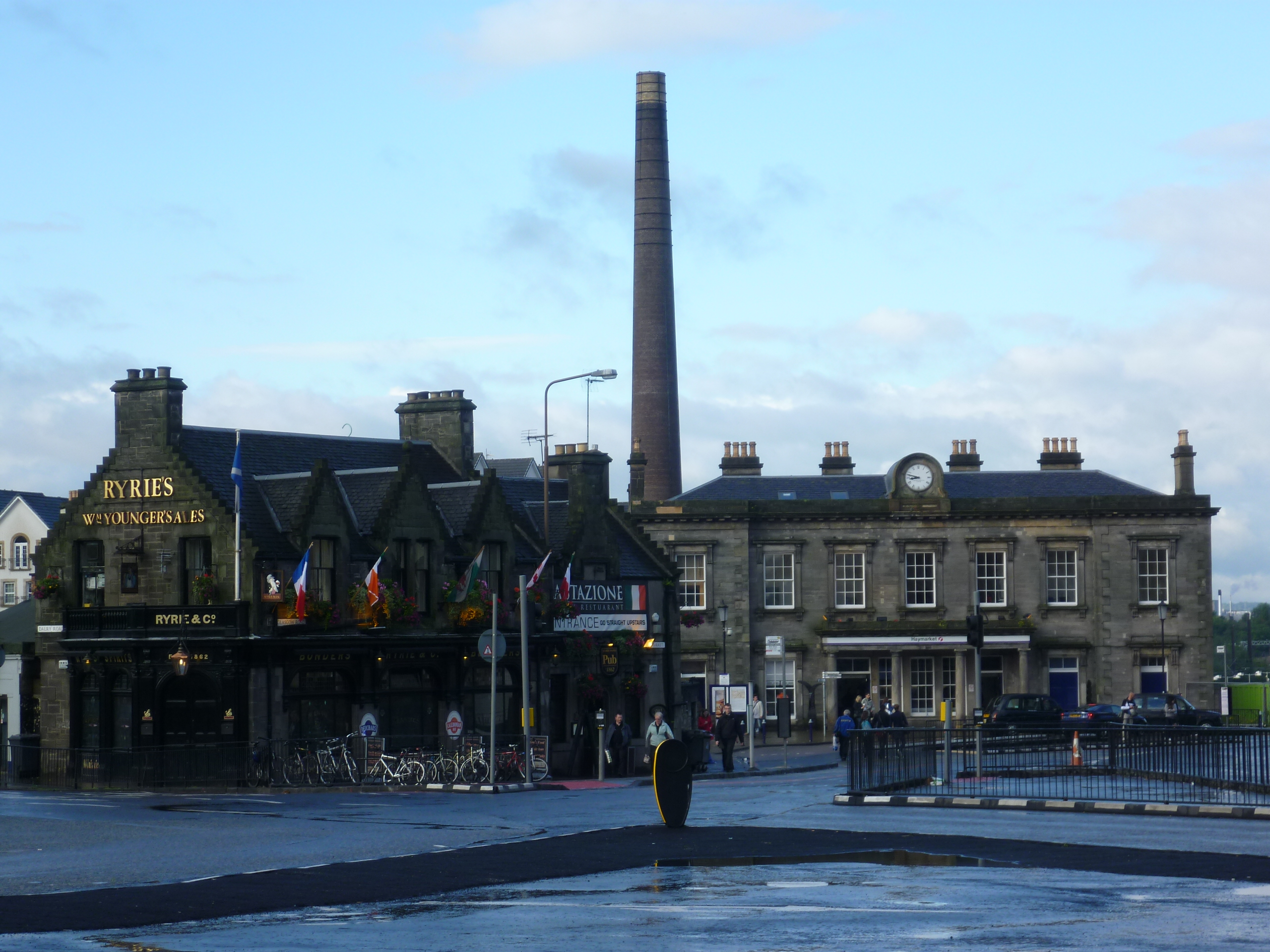
The 300ft Caledonian Distillery Chimney Stalk visible behind Haymarket junction, Edinburgh

In the early 21st century a substantial development occurred to the north west of Dalry on the industrial site of a former distillery that occupied land in both Dalry and in Haymarket. This was the Caledonian Distillery, a grain whisky distillery, which was in operation from 1885 to 1988. The site is now occupied by 20 acres of private residential housing in an estate named Dalry Gait. The 300ft chimney stalk of the distillery remains and is visible from as far away as Princes Street.

A series of railway works, the 'Dalry Road Depot' also existed to the east of Dalry, including a goods yard and several engine sheds. These were demolished in the 1960s (with the main engine shed being demolished in October 1965) and converted into flats, parkland and a supermarket in the late 20th century. The site is part of the West Approach Road and a park. The railway works served the former Wester Dalry Branchline, which was a part of the Caledonian Railway to Leith from the now defunct Edinburgh Princes Street railway station. The railway had two stops in Dalry; 'Dalry Road' and 'Dalry Junction'. The Dalry Road Stop was a passenger station, built to meet demand following the tenement building boom in Dalry, and it opened in 1894. The station closed on 30 April 1962. The line is now closed and removed; a small section of the platform is visible on a park path near Orwell Terrace. The section of the line between Haymarket West Junction and the Dalry Junction station is now a roadway, the West Approach Road which takes traffic directly into the city centre.

A bar on the corner of Downfield Place was internally destroyed by a fire in 2009. The collapse of the floor during the fire led to the death of one of the attending fire-fighters. The subsequent investigation into the Dalry fire led to the Scottish Fire and Rescue Service being fined following health and safety breaches.

=== Religious buildings ===
There are three church buildings in Dalry. St Martin of Tours Episcopal Church, constructed in 1883 is located on Dalry Road and is still used for services. St Martin's is a Scottish Episcopal Church and is located within the Diocese of Edinburgh. The other two are former churches which no longer operate as religious buildings. St Bride's Community Centre is a local community education centre that offers classes and activities for adults and children. It is run jointly by a local charity, the St Bride's association and also by the City of Edinburgh Council. The centre occupies the former St Bride's Church, which was constructed in 1908. In addition the charity also runs an art and education centre, the Garvald Centre, on Orwell Place, adjacent to Dalry House. The Dalry Congregational Church, on Caledonian Road, was constructed in 1872 by Alexander Heron and has been converted into accommodation as flats.

=== School and parks ===
Dalry has one school, built in 1876; the Dalry Primary School, for children in years 1 through to 7 in the Scottish Education System. The school won a Creative Learning Award in 2015. Dalry has two areas of parkland within its boundaries. The first is Murieston Park, a small community park with a children's playground, which is located on Murieston Crescent. A second area of parkland occupies part of the former railway goods yard and borders the West Approach Road. This includes a small sports pitch and children's playground.

== Dalry Cemetery ==
Dalry Cemetery was designed by David Cousin in 1846 in the wake of the success of both Dean Cemetery in the west and Warriston Cemetery in the north. This garden cemetery was developed and owned by the Metropolitan Cemetery Association. It represented part of the second wave of cemetery building in the city, specifically serving the south-west sections. It was built on land that was part of the Dalry estate, which was variously owned by the Chieslies. It comprises 6 acres and is one of the smaller cemeteries in Edinburgh. The lodge house post-dates the main construction and was added in 1873, to a design by the firm of Peddie and Kinnear. A Gothic entrance arch, built adjoining the lodge, was demolished in the 20th century. The cemetery was used most actively in the 19th century. However, it is the location of several 20th-century Commonwealth War Graves, including the resting place of 24 casualties of the First World War and 2 of the Second World War. By the mid-1970s the cemetery was neglected and in great disrepair. A clean-up and improvement campaign was organised by the 'Action for Dalry Cemetery Group' resulting in a series of improvements completed by September 1976. In 1987 Edinburgh Council compulsorily purchased the cemetery and after further restoration it was reopened for access in May 1991. During the 2020 COVID-19 pandemic the Friends of Dalry Cemetery was set up to maintain the site. Adjacent to the cemetery is a long steep lane called 'Coffin Lane'. The lane is bounded by high walls on both sides and has been used as a murder location in several fiction books including the Rebus novel Let It Bleed by Ian Rankin. The novel Crime by Irvine Welsh also includes reference to Dalry.

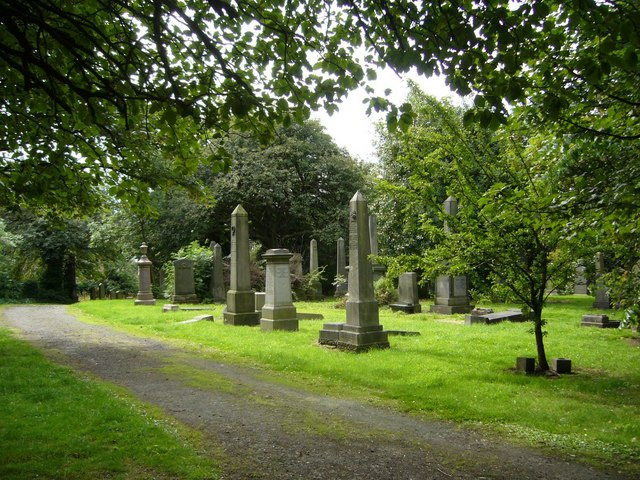

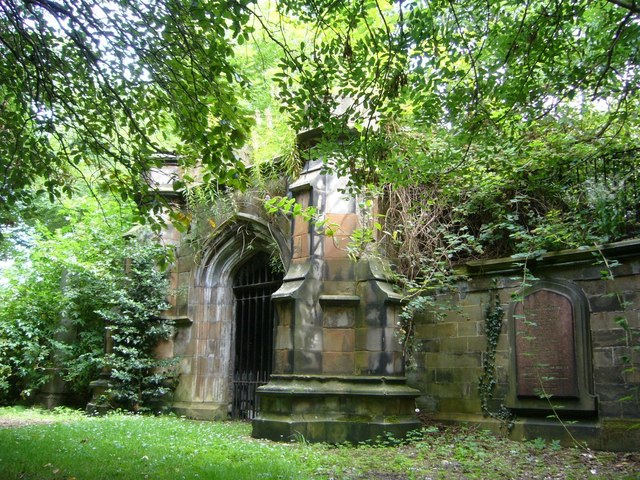

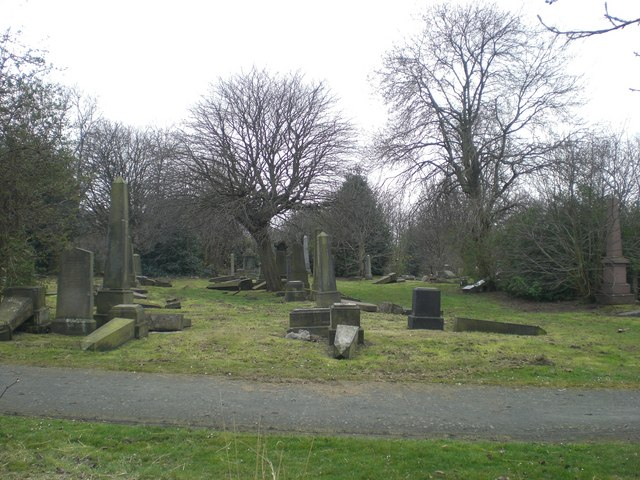

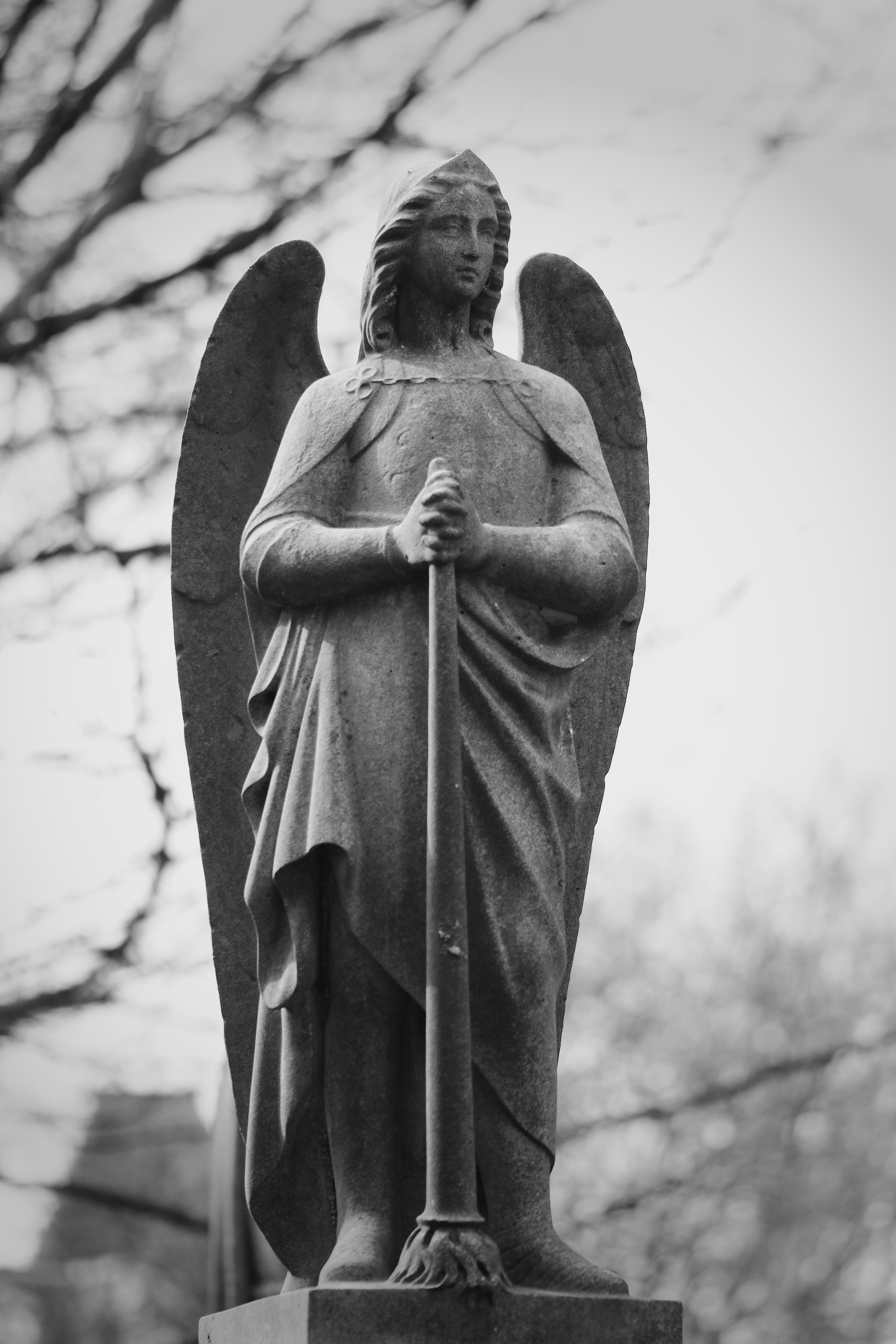

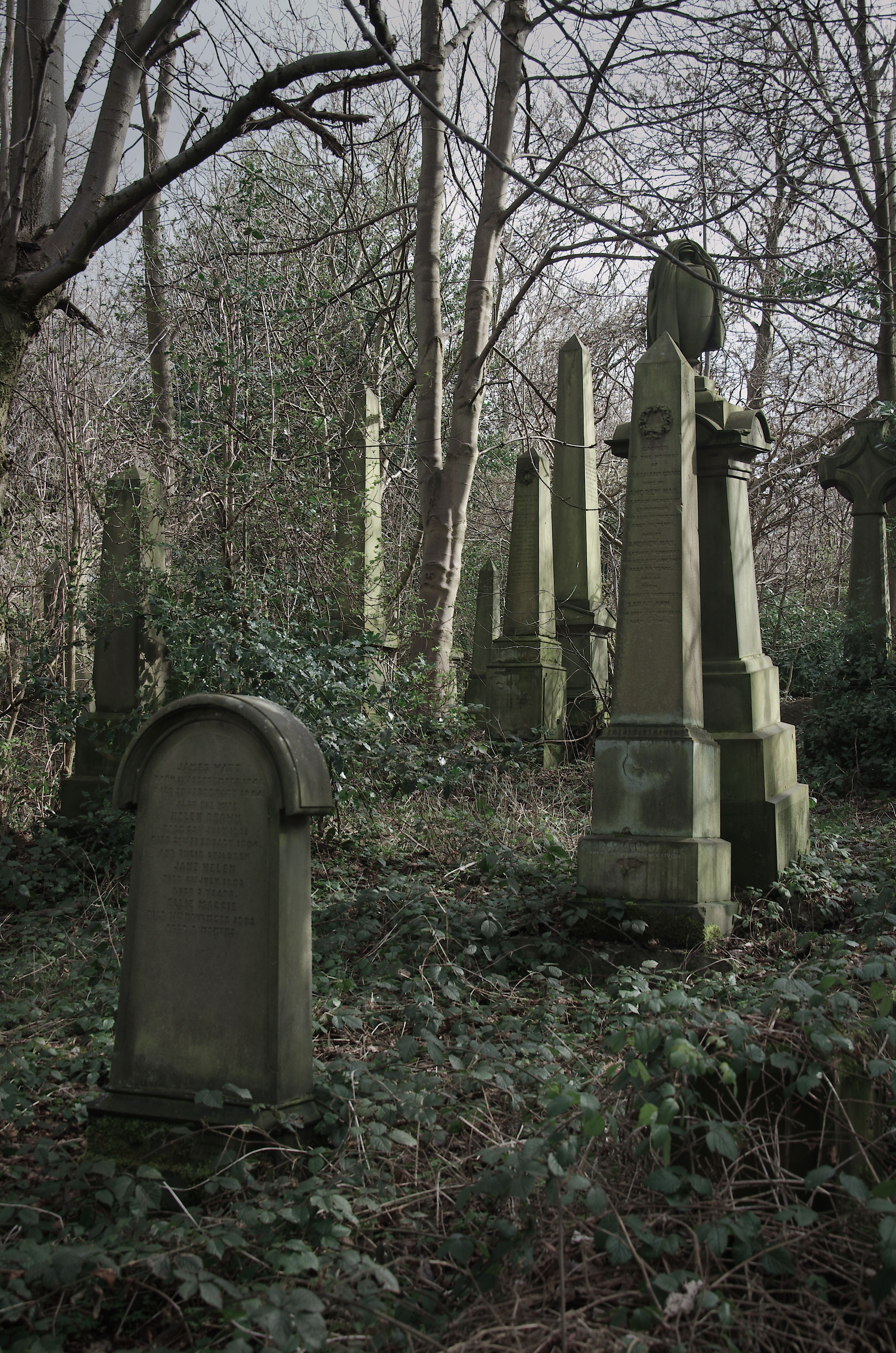

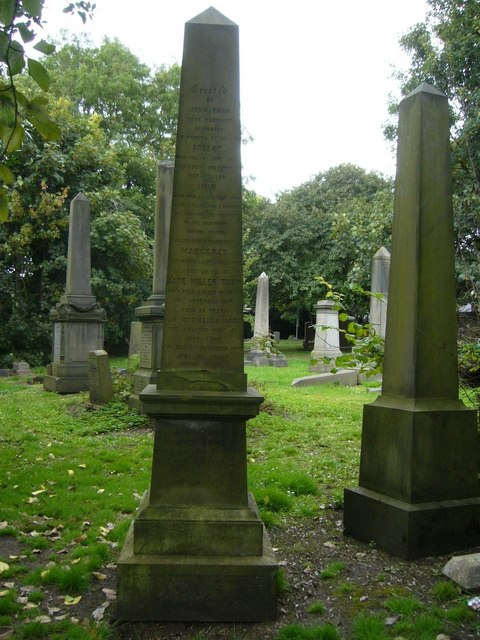

=== Notable interments ===
- George Cupples (1822–1891) author and philologist and his wife Anne Jane Cupples (1839–1896) author.
- Peter Devine (photographer) (1820–1875) photographer and miniature painter.
- David Kerr (sculptor) (1814–1858) plus his sculptor grandson, David S. Kerr (1873–1955).
- George Maccallum (1840–1868) sculptor.
- John Stevenson Rhind (1859–1937) sculptor. He is buried with his wife. The grave lies against the north wall, west of the Dalry Road entrance.
- Very Rev Alexander Lockhart Simpson DD (1785-1861) Moderator of the General Assembly of the Church of Scotland in 1849.

== Government and politics ==
Dalry is represented by the Edinburgh South West Parliamentary Constituency. The current Member of Parliament (MP) is Scott Arthur who is a member of the Labour party. Dalry is represented in the Scottish Parliament as part of the Edinburgh Central constituency, which is currently represented by the SNP's Angus Robertson. Edinburgh Central is located within the Lothian Electoral Region. Locally, residents are served by the Gorgie Dalry Community Council, which is a constituent of the City of Edinburgh Council. The council usually meet in St Martin's church hall on Dalry Road.

== See also ==
- Foot-Ball Club
