= Agnes Campbell (printer) =

Scottish printer and book merchant (1637–1716)

Agnes Campbell, Lady Roseburn (1637 — 24 July 1716), Scottish businesswoman, was "Scotland's wealthiest early modern printer."

== Early life ==
Agnes Campbell was the daughter of Isobel Orr and James Campbell. Her father was a merchant in Edinburgh, Scotland. She was baptised on 1 September 1637.

== Career ==
Agnes Campbell married the printer Andrew Anderson in 1656. In 1663, Anderson became printer to the Edinburgh Town Council, and in 1671, he was named King's Printer for Scotland. When her husband died in 1676, 38-year-old Agnes took over the exclusive licence and built the largest printing business in Edinburgh.

Agnes Campbell remarried in 1681. In 1693, her petition to Parliament was granted, and Agnes Campbell's printing business remained independent from her second husband Patrick Telfer's financial oversight. She was Daniel Defoe's Scottish printer, and published a folio edition of his poem "Caledonia."

In 1709, she launched a paper mill at Penicuik, the first paper mill on the River Esk. She was appointed printer to the General Assembly of the Church of Scotland in 1712, around the same time that the King's Printer appointment expired and was granted to one of her rivals.

In 1715 she purchased Roseburn House, formerly the home of Mungo Russell. She thereafter was known informally as Lady Roseburn.

== Personal life ==
Agnes Campbell was Presbyterian in religious affiliation. She purchased an estate, Roseburn, in 1704, and was thereafter known as Lady Roseburn. She married twice, and had at least eight children. She died in July 1716, age 78, in Edinburgh, and left a significant fortune to her heirs.

A short biography of Lady Roseburn was published in 1925.
