= Roseburn =

Suburb of Edinburgh, Scotland

Coordinates: 55°56′44.27″N 3°14′4.32″W

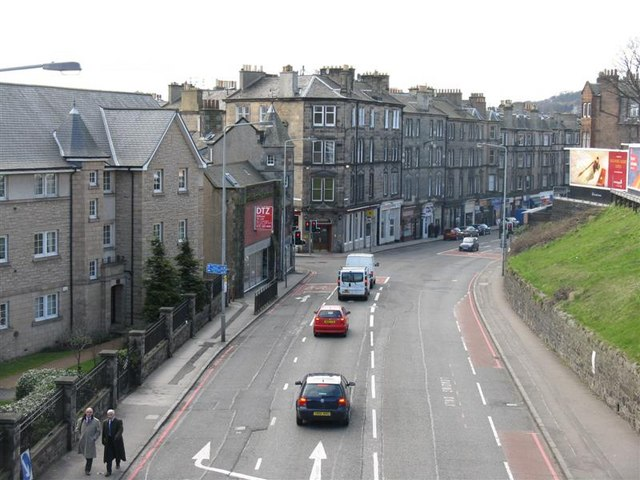

- Location within the City of Edinburgh council area Location within Scotland
- OS grid reference: NT227728
- Council area: City of Edinburgh
- Lieutenancy area: Edinburgh
- Country: Scotland
- Sovereign state: United Kingdom
- Post town: EDINBURGH
- Postcode district: EH12
- Dialling code: 0131
- Police: Scotland
- Fire: Scottish
- Ambulance: Scottish
- UK Parliament: Edinburgh West
- Scottish Parliament: Edinburgh Central

Roseburn is a suburb of Edinburgh, the capital of Scotland.

The area lies in the west of the city, approximately a 20-minute walk from the city centre, west of Haymarket and close to the Murrayfield area (and Murrayfield Stadium). It is immediately to the south of the A8 road.

The Water of Leith flows along one side of Roseburn Park next to the Water of Leith Walkway. Other boundaries to the park are Murrayfield Stadium and Murrayfield Ice Rink. The park is used for football in the winter and cricket in the summer. It has a small play area popular with pre-school and young children. The park is popular with dog walkers.

Roseburn Primary School offers education for children from Nursery to Primary 7. The main building is Victorian and has listed building status.

Businesses located in Roseburn include bars, restaurants, take aways, groceries, art work, jewellery, flowers, home furnishings, pharmaceutical goods, cake decoration, furniture and hairdressing.

== Transport ==
Roseburn is served by Lothian Buses services 12, X18, 26, 31, and the Airlink (100), McGill's Scotland East services 18, X24, X25 & X38, Scottish Citylink services 900 & 909, and Murrayfield tram stop.

== Notable residents ==
- Mungo Russell, merchant landowner who built Roseburn House.
- Agnes Campbell (printer) (d.1716) Lady Roseburn
- Wendy Wood, Scottish nationalist, artist, writer and Jackanory presenter.
