= Anne Jane Cupples =

Scottish writer and populariser of science

- Anne Jane D. Douglas, Gilmore Place, 1855. Watercolour on paper by George Cupples.
- Born: 4 January 1839; Edinburgh
- Died: 14 November 1896 (aged 57); Dunedin
- Occupations: Writer, children's writer
- Spouse: George Cupples

Anne Jane Cupples, née Douglas (4 January 1839 – 14 November 1896) was a Scottish writer and populariser of science. She was married to a famous maritime novelist George Cupples, and after his death moved to be with her sisters in New Zealand, where she died in 1896. She wrote around fifty books in total, mostly intended for children, under the name Mrs George Cupples.

== Early life ==
Anne was born on 4 January 1839 at 34 Gilmore Place, Edinburgh, the second daughter and third of seven children of Archibald Douglas of Morton, and his wife, Caroline Montague Douglas, née Scott. On 18 May 1858, Anne, aged 19, married George Cupples, a respected literary figure and breeder of Scotch deerhounds, aged 36. In 1859, her father died at the age of 55, and her widowed mother continued as planned to New Zealand, where she established a small school at Pelichet Bay, near Dunedin. Anne Jane remained in Scotland, along with a brother, who later travelled to New Zealand.

== Writing ==
Mrs Cupples' first book to be published appears to be Unexpected Pleasures or, Left Alone in the Holidays, published by W.P. Nimmo, Edinburgh in 1868. This book was published when Ann Jane was 29 years old, ten years since the Cupples were married, and she may have realised that she was not going to have children. She may have been looking for a productive means of filling in her time by writing for other people's children.

1869 saw the publication of her full‑length novel for boys, Norrie Seton or, Driven to Sea, again published by W. P. Nimmo, Edinburgh. Nimmos brought out a new edition in 1896. This book appears to have been inspired by her husband's unhappy teenage years on a sailing ship on the trade route between Britain and India.

She is also the author of Bill Marlin's Tales of the Sea (1867) or (1860), Tappy's chicks and other links between nature and human nature (1872), The children's voyage, or a trip in the Water Fairey (1873), Fables: illustrated stories from real life (2 series, 1874-5) and about 45 other books. From 1869 onwards, 26 of her books were published by T. Nelson & Sons of London, including Alice Leighton; or, A Good Name is rather to be chosen than riches, Carryś Rose or, The Magic of Kindness and Hugh Wellwoodś Success or, Where Thereś a Will Thereś a Way.

== Correspondence with Charles Darwin ==
In a letter dated 28 Nov 1870, Anne Jane Cupples wrote to Charles Darwin to seek his help in securing a government pension for her husband. Darwin later corresponded with her about her observations of emotions in dogs, and urged the Royal Literary Fund to support her and her husband.

== Social work ==
Cupples founded a school erected by public subscription, for the training of orphan girls and boys from Glasgow, situated on Duchray Water, Aberfoyle. She was also a member of the committee of the Edinburgh YWCA.

== Later life ==
On 17 October 1891, George Cupples died aged 69, and three years later Mrs Cupples decided to join her sisters in New Zealand. She sailed from Plymouth in RMS Gothic for Port Chalmers, arriving there on 14 November 1894. She spent the next four years living with her unmarried sisters, Margaret and Caroline Douglas who lived at Mosgiel, near Dunedin. Anne Jane published George's life's findings on dogs in a lavish illustrated book of over three hundred pages called Scotch Deer hounds and their Masters.

There is a memorial stone to George and Anne in Dalry Cemetery in south-west Edinburgh, but they are not buried there. The stone marks the burying ground of Anne's father, Archibald Douglas.

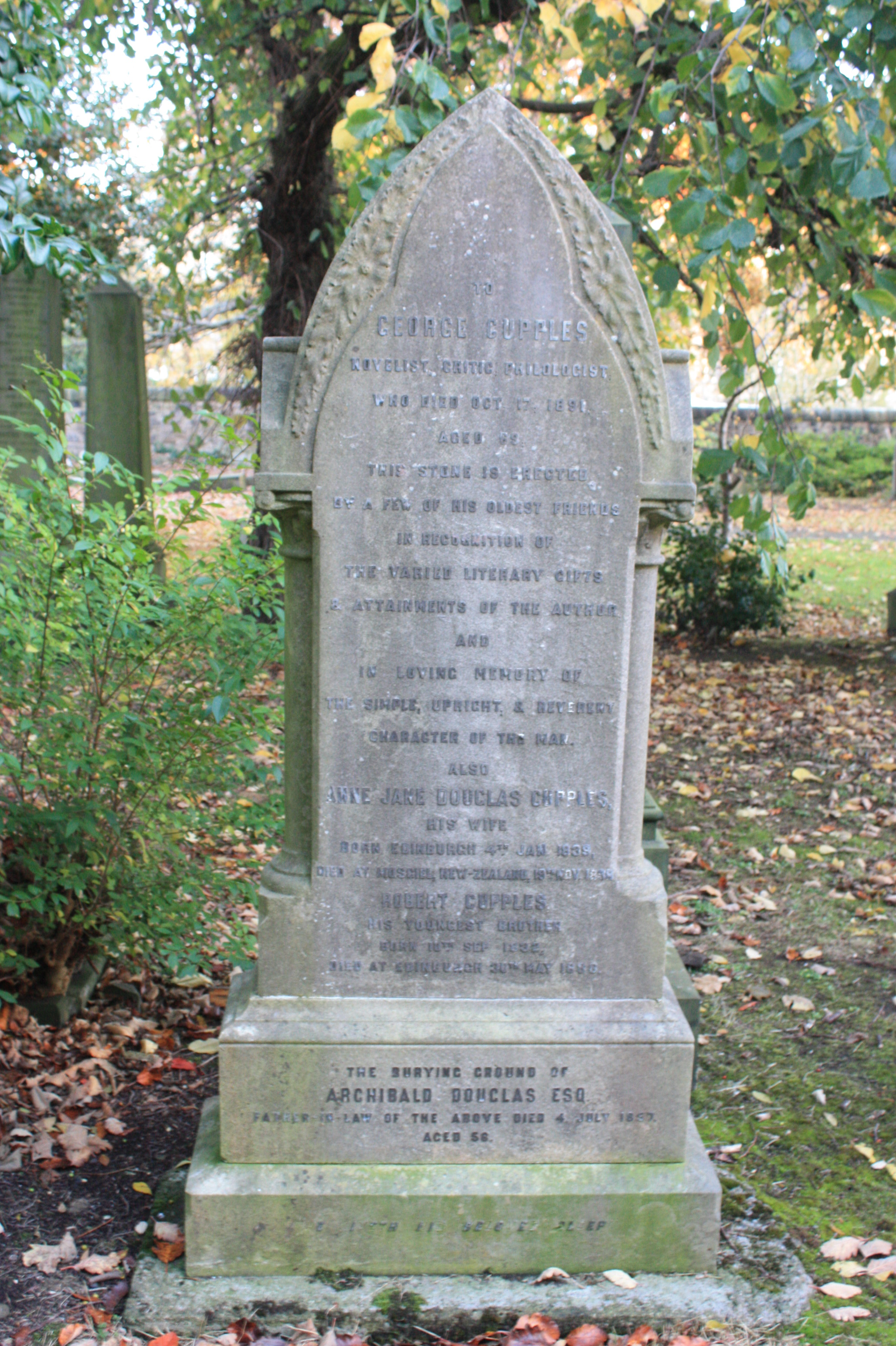
The grave of George and Anne Jane Cupples, Dalry Cemetery, Edinburgh

== Works ==
=== Fiction ===
- Unexpected Pleasures; or, Left alone in the holidays. 1868. Edinburgh : William P. Nimmo. 203pp.
- Hugh Wellwood's Success; or, Where there's a will there's a way. 1869. London : T. Nelson & Sons. 48pp.
- Norrie Seton; or, Driven to sea. 1869. Edinburgh : William P. Nimmo. x+326pp+illustrations.
- Carry's Rose; or, the Magic of kindness. 1869. London : T. Nelson & Sons. 48pp.
- The Woodfords : an emigrant story. And other tales. 1869. Edinburgh: Johnstone, Hunter & Co. vii+312pp. Published in parts, Apr.-Sept. 1869. Childs Hour Series.
- Alice Leighton; or, a Good name is rather to be chosen than riches . 1870. London : T. Nelson & Sons. 48pp.
- The story of Miss Dollikins : the letters she receives while keeping house for Miss Laura. 1870 London : T. Nelson and Sons. 30pp.
- The Story of our Doll. 1870. London : T. Nelson & Sons. 160pp.
- Bill Marlin's Tales of the Sea. 1870. Edinburgh : Johnstone, Hunter & Co.
- Grandpapa's Presents; or, Take heed will surely speed. 1871. London : T. Nelson & Sons. 165pp.
- Vea and her cousins, or, Kind words to awaken kind echoes. A tale for the young. 1872. London : T. Nelson and Sons. 72pp
- Tappy's chicks and other links between nature and human nature. 1872. London. London : Strahan & Co. 321pp+15 illustrations. 8vo.
- Fanny Silvester, or, A merry heart doeth good like a medicine. A tale for the young. 1872. London : T. Nelson and Sons. 72pp
- Bluff Crag, or, A good word costs nothing. A tale for the young. 1872. London : T. Nelson and Sons. 72pp + frontispiece. 8vo.
- The Adventures of Mark Willis. 1872. London : T. Nelson and Sons. 168pp. 12mo.
- Bertha Marchmont, or, All is not gold that glitters. A tale for the young. 1872. . London : T. Nelson and Sons. 72pp.
- The Children's Voyage; or, a Trip in the Water Fairy. 1873. London : Marcus Ward & Co. 126pp.
- Katty Lester. A book for girls. 1873. London : Marcus Ward & Co. 118p.
- Tim Leeson's First Shilling; or, Try again. 1874. London : T. Nelson and Sons. 64pp.
- Uncle Dick's Story; or, What can't be cured must be endured. 1874. London : T. Nelson and Sons. 64pp.
- Shadows on the Screen; or, an Evening with the children. 1874. London : T. Nelson and Sons. 120pp.
- Walks and Talks with Grandpapa. 1874. London : T. Nelson and Sons. 120pp.
- A Kind Action never thrown away; or, the Gipsy's gratitude. 1874. London : T. Nelson and Sons. 64pp.
- Fables illustrated by stories from real life. 1874 London : T. Nelson and Sons.
- Edmond Darley; or, One good turn deserves another. 1874. London : T. Nelson and Sons. 64pp.
- Young bright-eye, or, Charlie Harvey's first voyage. 1875. Edinburgh, London : Gall & Inglis. 4 full page illustrations.
- The lost rabbit, or, Look at everything and touch nothing. 1875. London: T. Nelson & Sons. 64pp.
- Grandpapa's presents, or, Take heed will surely speed. 1875. London : T. Nelson and Sons. 175pp.
- Mamma's stories about domestic pets. 1876. London : T. Nelson & Sons. 167pp.
- Talks with Uncle Richard, about wild animals. 1876. London : T. Nelson & Sons. 167pp.
- Terrapin Island; or, Adventures with the "Gleam". 1876. Edinburgh, London : Gall & Inglis. 288pp+8 woodcuts.
- Hard to win; or, a Yoke broken. 1878. Hamilton : Edinburgh.
- Alice Leighton; or, A good name is rather to be chosen than riches. A tale for the young. 1879. London : T. Nelson & Sons. 72pp.
- Walks and talks with grandpapa. 1881. London: T. Nelson and Sons. viii+(9-120)pp
- The Cockatoo's Story. 1881. London : T. Nelson & Sons. 98pp+12 illustrations.
- The Little Captain. [1885]. London, Edinburgh : Gall & Inglis. 128pp+ illustrations.
- The Old Dolphin. [1885]. London, Edinburgh : Gall & Inglis. 128pp+ illustrations.
- The Redfords: an emigrant story. [1887]. London : Blackie & Son. 127pp.
- Hazelwood Farm. A country story. [1887]. London, Edinburgh : Gall & Inglis. 96pp+ illustrations.
- Aboard the Mersey: or, Our youngest passenger. [1887]. London : Blackie & Son. 96pp.
- Alf Jetsam, or, Found afloat. [1887]. London : Blackie & Son. 127pp.
- Our Sailmaker's Yarn. By Mrs. G. Cupples; and other stories of the sea, by popular authors. 1889. Edinburgh : W. P. Nimmo, Hay, & Mitchell. 128pp.

=== Miscellaneous works ===
- The stocking-knitter's manual. A handy book for the work-table. 1868. Edinburgh : Johnstone, Hunter and Co. 32pp.
- A Knitting-Book of Counterpanes: toilet-covers, pin-cushions, and other articles of fancy work. 1871. Edinburgh : Johnstone, Hunter & Co. 32pp.
- The Poetical Remains of William. Glen. With a memoir by the Rev Charles Rogers, and an account of the Aberfoyle Orphanage conducted by the poet's widow and daughter by Mrs. George Cupples 1874 Edinburgh : William Paterson, 150pp+frontispiece portrait.
- The hidden talent, or, Use in everything. 1875. London : T. Nelson and Sons. 64pp.
- A Book about House Work. A convenient manual for mistresses and maids. 1877. London: : Simpkin, Marshall, & Co. 96pp.
- Edenside, or, The lights and shadows of our village. 1881. Edinburgh
- Memoir of Mrs. Valentine, Jeypore. With a sketch of her father, Judge Fraser of Lucknow 1882. London : James Nisbet & Co 257pp
- Our parlour panorama 1882. London: T. Nelson and Sons. x+(11-92)pp.
