= George Cupples =

Scottish journalist and writer

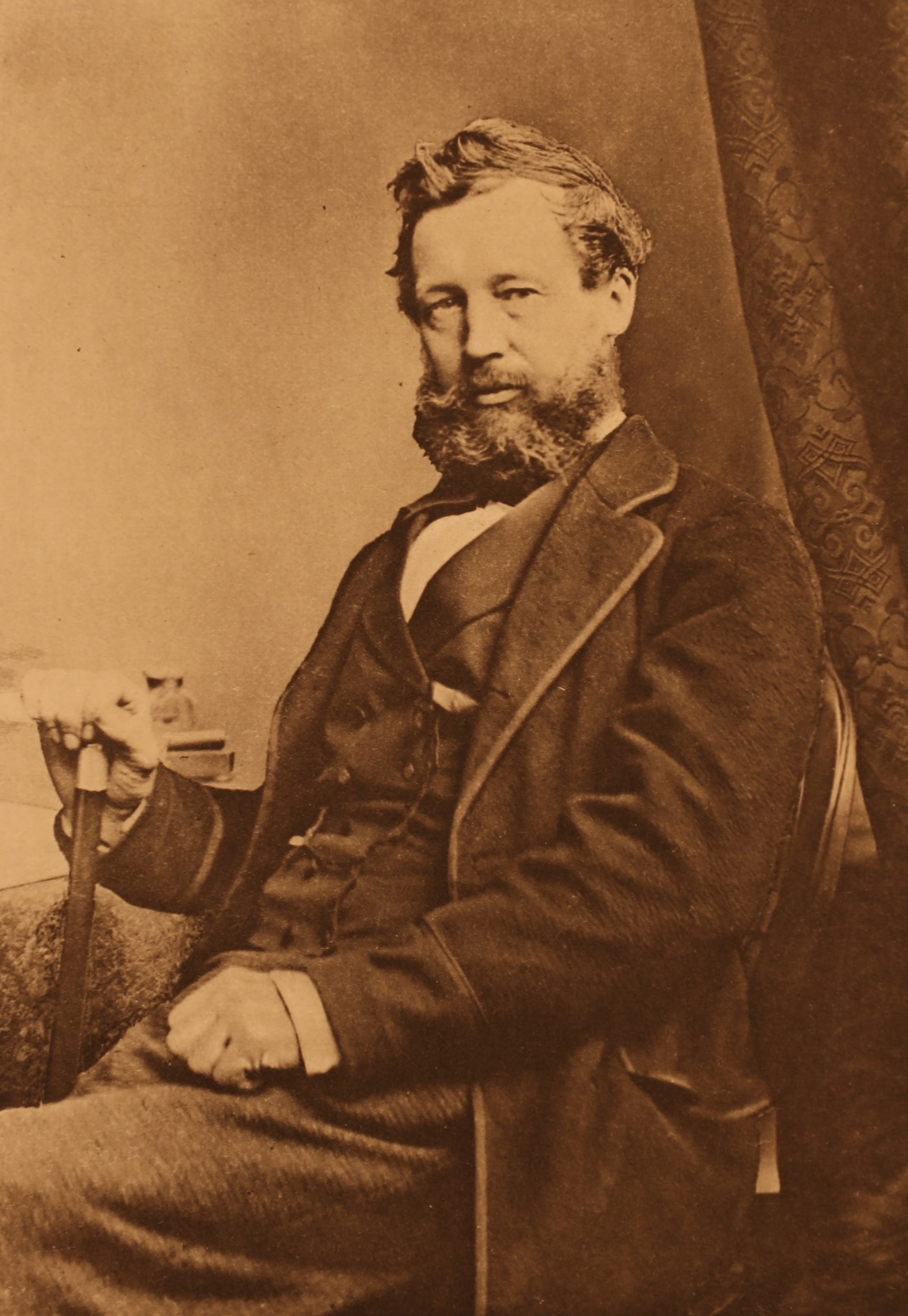
- George Cupples, as depicted in his book Scotch deer-hounds and their masters, 1894.
- Born: 2 August 1822; Legerwood, Berwickshire, Scotland
- Died: 17 October 1891 (aged 69); Newhaven, Edinburgh, Scotland
- Education: University of Edinburgh
- Spouse: Anne Jane Cupples

George Cupples (2 August 1822 — 17 October 1891) was a Scottish journalist and a writer, who became famous at the end of 19th century for his maritime novels. In particular, his novel The Green Hand: adventures of a naval lieutenant was considered "one of the best sea stories ever written" at the time. His wife, Anne Jane Cupples, also became a famous writer of juvenile and children books.

== Biography ==
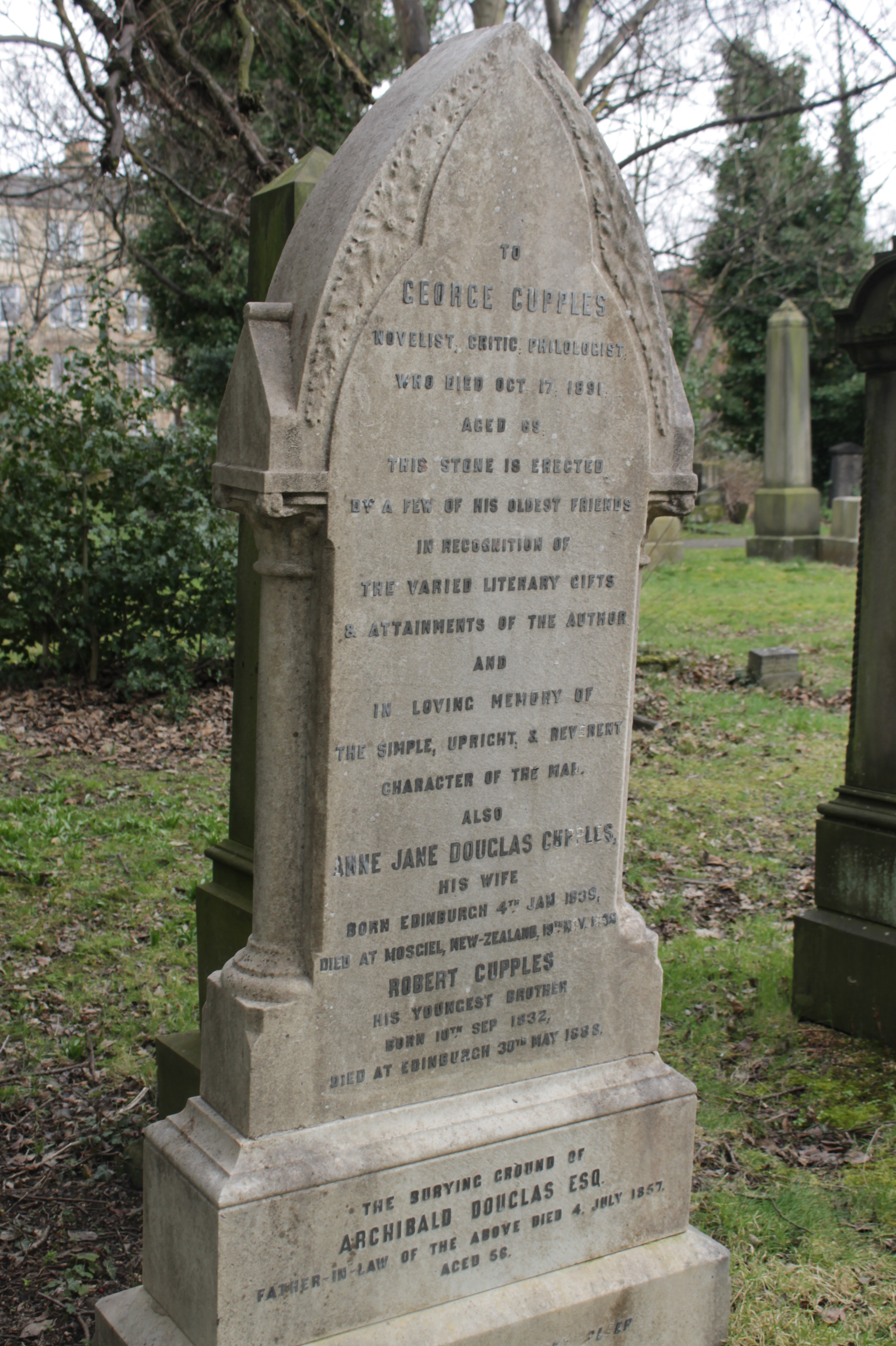
The grave of George Cupples, Dalry Cemetery

George Cupples was born on 2 August 1822 in Legerwood manse in south-east Scotland in the family of Reverend George Cupples. His paternal ancestors were Calvinistic ministers for at least three generations, and Cupples was intended for the same profession. Cupples started his education at the ministry, then studied at Dr. Munro's academy in Stirling. After graduating from the academy at the age of 12 in 1834, Cupples entered the University of Edinburgh. He did not complete his studies at the university, however, and in protest against the intended career, in 1839 Cupples travelled to Liverpool and sailed to India on the barque Patriot King as an apprentice.

When Cupples returned to Britain after 18 months at sea, he chose not to continue his maritime career, finding the life of a seaman too weary. Instead, he returned to the University of Edinburgh, graduated from it after the total of eight years of studies, and pursued a literary career. His most notable novel, The Green Hand was first published in Blackwood's Magazine from 1848 to 1851. Most of Cupples' journalistic work and some of his novels were published anonymously. On 18 May 1858, 35-year-old Cupples married 19-year-old daughter of post office official, Anne Jane Douglas, who also later pursued literary career, publishing almost 50 children books, using the name "Mrs. George Cupples."

In 1886, 63-year-old Cupples, already a famous maritime writer, repeated his voyage to India aboard the three-masted merchant ship Star of Bengal as an honorary first mate. The ship arrived in Calcutta on 19 August 1886; shortly after her arrival the ship's captain, William Legg, broke his leg. Under the circumstances, Cupples assumed the command and successfully brought the Star of Bengal home, arriving in London on 1 February 1887.

Cupples died on 17 October 1891 in Admiral House, in Newhaven, Edinburgh. He is buried in Dalry Cemetery in the south-west of Edinburgh. The grave lies in the south central section.

== Selected bibliography ==
- The Secret of Stoke Manor (unfinished, partially published in Blackwoods Magazine), Edinburgh, 1854
- The two frigates, London, 1859.
- The Green Hand: adventures of a naval lieutenant, London, 1856
- Captain Herbert (3 volumes), London, 1864
- Hinchbridge Haunted: a country ghoststory, Edinburgh, 1859
- Cupples Howe, Mariner. A tale of the sea., London, 1885
- Scotch Deer Hounds and their Masters (2 volumes), Edinburgh, 1894 (published posthumously with the assistance of his wife)
- Sermons and Discoveries by a Layman
- The Sunken Rock: A tale of the Mediterranean, Edinburgh, 1879
- Deserted ship: a story of the Atlantic, Boston, 1873 (165 pages)

== Family ==
He was married to Anne Jane Douglas daughter of Archibald Douglas.

== See also ==
- Anne Jane Cupples

== Literature cited ==
- Boase, Frederic (1908). Modern English biography, containing many thousand concise memoirs of persons who have died since the year 1850, with an index of the most interesting matter. Vol. IV. Truro: Netherton and Worth. LCCN 01005198. OCLC 84432490.
- Wanamaker, John (July 1891). "The Author of "The Green Hand"". The Book News. 9 (107). Philadelphia: John Wanamaker: 452–453. LCCN 07021062. OCLC 950906408.
- Cunliffe, John William; Thorndike, Ashley Horace, eds. (1917). The Warner library (PDF). Vol. 7. New York City: Knickerbocker Press. LCCN 17028177. OCLC 337774.
- Lubbock, Basil (1927). The last of the windjammers. Vol. 1. Glasgow: Brown, Son & Ferguson. LCCN 27023850. OCLC 832859144.
- Gibbs, Jim (1997). Alaskan maritime. Schiffer history book. Atglen: Schiffer Publishing. ISBN 0764300350. LCCN 97080089. OCLC 38294528.
