= Haymarket, Edinburgh =

Area of Edinburgh, Scotland

Coordinates: 55°56′46.54″N 3°13′0.72″W

Haymarket: Scottish Gaelic: Margadh an Fheòir; Scots: Heymercat
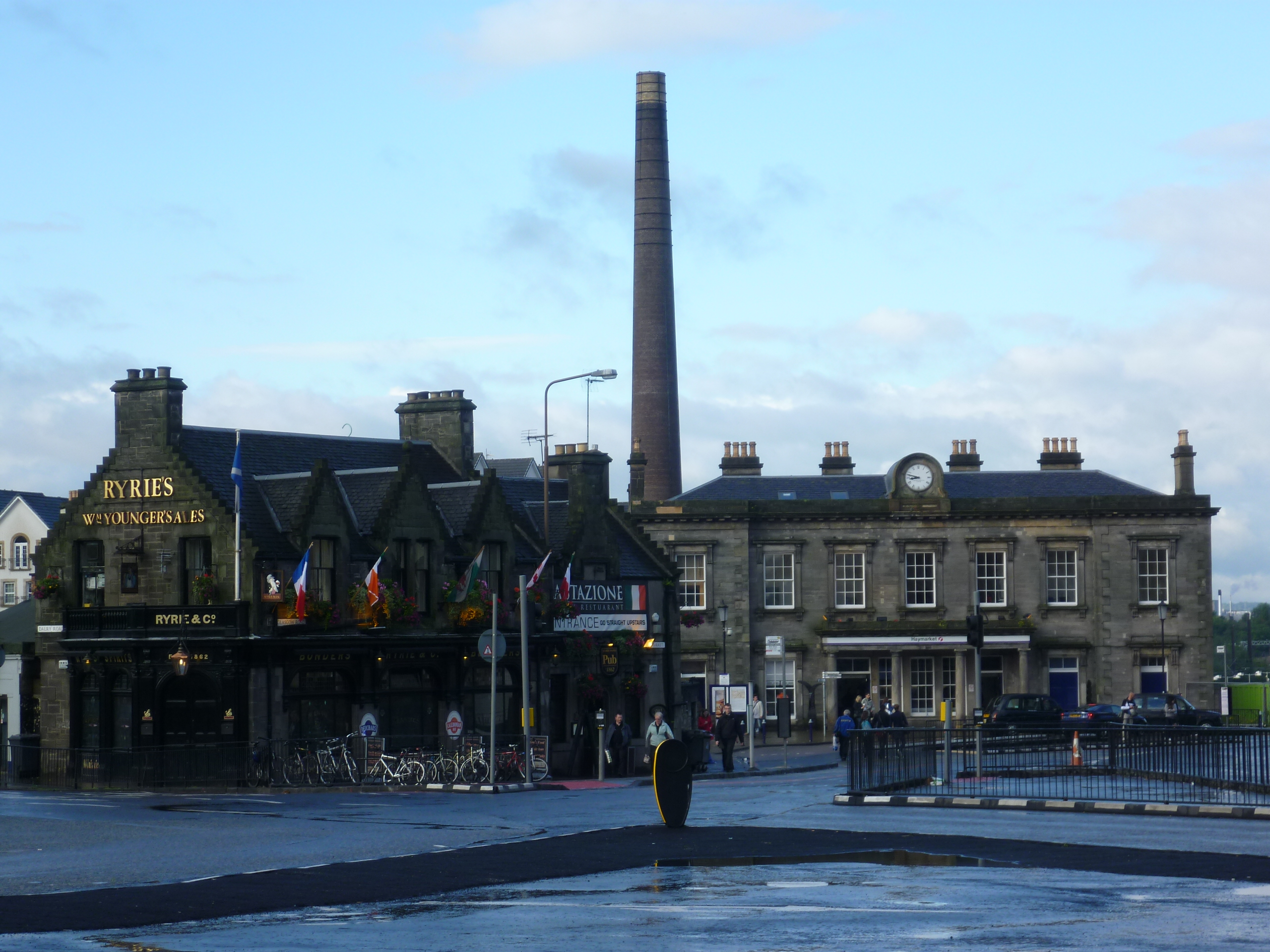
- Haymarket junction

- Location within the City of Edinburgh council area Location within Scotland
- OS grid reference: NT240732
- Council area: City of Edinburgh
- Lieutenancy area: Edinburgh
- Country: Scotland
- Sovereign state: United Kingdom
- Post town: EDINBURGH
- Postcode district: EH3, EH12
- Dialling code: 0131
- Police: Scotland
- Fire: Scottish
- Ambulance: Scottish
- UK Parliament: Edinburgh West; Edinburgh South West
- Scottish Parliament: Edinburgh Central

Haymarket (Scots: Heymercat, Scottish Gaelic: Margadh an Fheòir) is an area of Edinburgh, Scotland. It is in the west of the city centre and is the junction of several main roads, notably Dalry Road (which leads south-west to Gorgie Road and the M8 motorway to Glasgow), Corstorphine Road (leading west to the M8 and the M9 for Stirling and the north), and Shandwick Place (leading east to Princes Street and the city centre). Haymarket contains a number of pubs, cafés and restaurants.

== War memorial ==
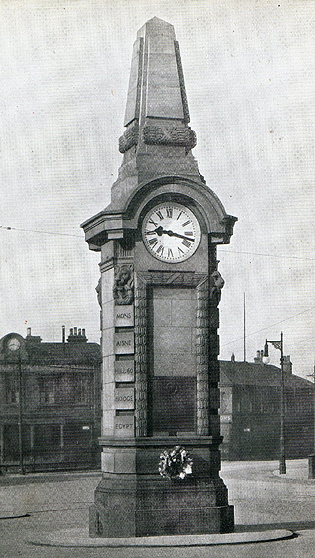
The Heart of Midlothian War Memorial at the centre of the Haymarket junction in 1922

In the centre of the crossroads at the heart of Haymarket is a war memorial in the form of a clock tower that was unveiled in 1922. It is principally to commemorate former players of Heart of Midlothian F.C. but also for players from other Scottish clubs, those being Hibernian, Raith Rovers, Dunfermline, East Fife and St Bernard's, who were also part of McCrae's Battalion, known as "The footballers' Battalion", who died in World Wars I and II. It was designed by the sculptor Henry Snell Gamley. The memorial was temporarily removed in 2010 to allow construction of the tramway across the road junction. It was replaced in a slightly different position in 2013, in time for the commemoration of the centenary of the outbreak of World War I. The clock was made by James Ritchie & Son, who were clockmakers in Edinburgh.

== Transport interchange ==
The redeveloped Haymarket railway station is located here and is called at by the busy commuter services to Glasgow and Fife, as well as long-distance services to Carlisle, Inverness and Aberdeen.

Edinburgh Trams' Haymarket stop is located adjacently north of the station for connections to the west of the city as far as Edinburgh Airport and the city centre to the east. The westbound tramway continues off-street at this point via Haymarket Yards.

Lothian Buses are the main operator for local bus connections to and from the interchange stop on Haymarket Terrace, and nearby Dalry Road. Routes to West Lothian, Falkirk and Stirling areas are operated by McGill's Scotland East and Lothian Country (a Lothian Buses brand). Express coach connections from Glasgow are operated by Scottish Citylink.

The taxi rank is situated in Rosebery Crescent.

== Economy ==
There are several hotels and pubs in the Haymarket area. On Haymarket Terrace, the Ryries Pub, formerly the Haymarket Tavern is Category B listed. The building dates primarily to 1868, with some early 19th century additions.

== Haymarket Business District Redevelopment ==
Plans to develop the former Morrison Street Goods Yard, a former railway site which has been partially derelict and partially a car park for many years were approved by The City of Edinburgh Council on 25 June 2008. Tiger Developments purchased the site from City of Edinburgh Council for approximately £50 million in December 2006. The plans for the site included a 17-storey, 5-star hotel, a 3-star hotel, office buildings, retail space, bars, shops and a small supermarket. However, this approval was overturned by Scottish ministers in October 2009, on the recommendation of a planning inquiry reporter, citing concerns about the impact of the 17-storey hotel on Edinburgh's skyline.

A revised planning application, incorporating a similar mixed use, with a lower skyline, was approved by the Council in December 2010. Work to strengthen the railway tunnels under Haymarket began in 2013 in preparation for the construction of the new £200m development above which is to include a 320-space underground car park. This involves grouting between the tunnel lining and the surrounding ground, and drilling and inserting metal bars within the brick lining. Due to line operations, works access was limited in the north tunnel to between midnight and 5am four nights of the week and in the south tunnel from 1am to 9.30am one night a week.

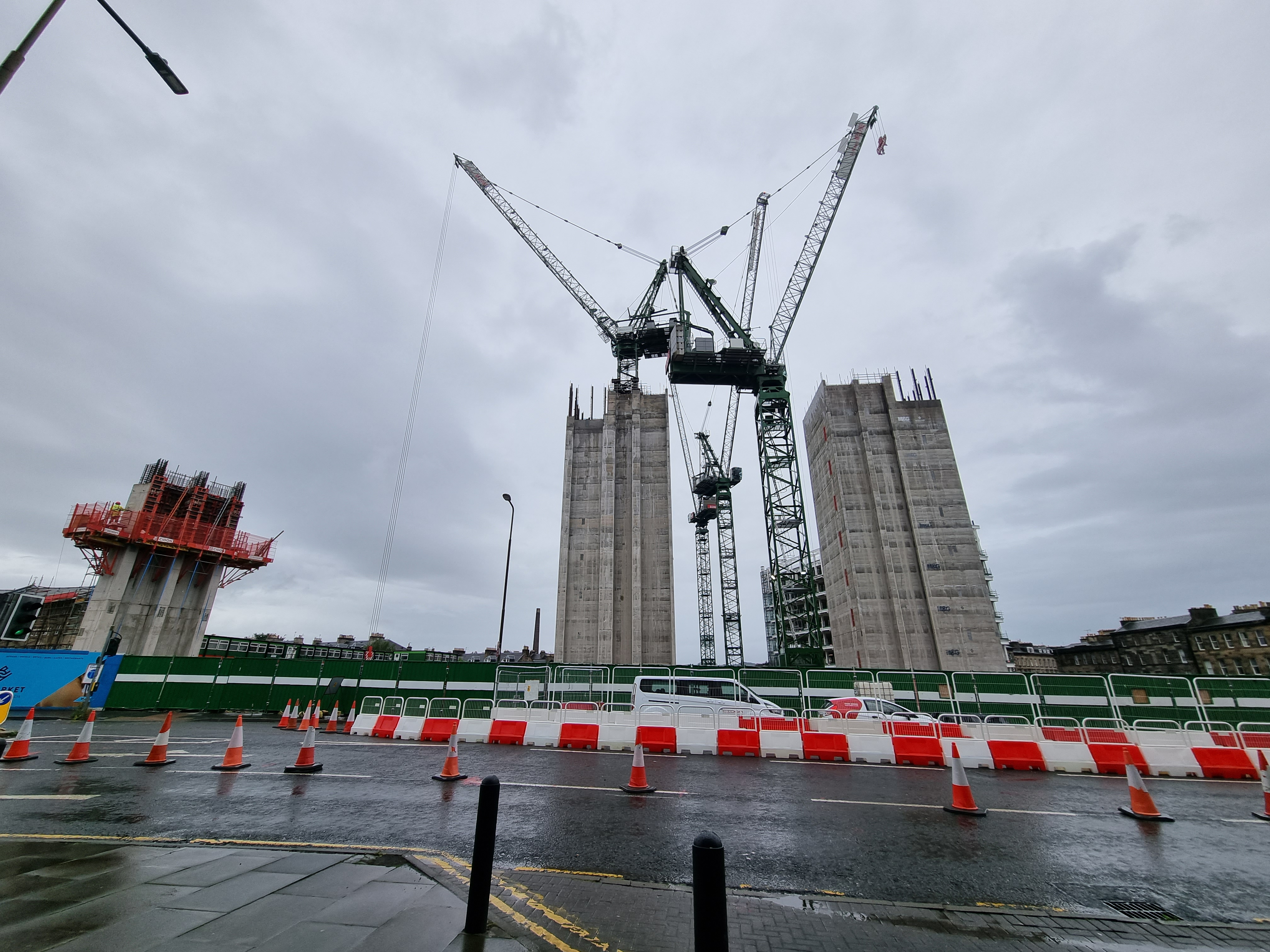
The Haymarket redevelopment in August 2021

Above-ground construction was scheduled to start in early 2015 and the first phase was expected to be complete by 2016. However, delays in the strengthening of the tunnels and the sale of the project to M&G Real Estate by Interserve delayed the start of construction. The Haymarket, as the development is to be known, will provide new pedestrian links to neighbouring Fountainbridge and The Exchange district. In 2019, M&G appointed Edinburgh property developer Qmile Group to begin the now costed £350m mixed-use development, including new offices (to include a new HQ for Baillie Gifford, hotel accommodation (including a 190-room Hyatt hotel a 172-room aparthotel) and 40,000 sq ft of retail and leisure space designed by Foster and Partners. Completion is expected in 2023.

By February 2022 QMile group confirmed pre-let all 390,000 sq ft of the first stage of the development.
