= Mungo Russell (merchant) =

Scottish merchant and burgh treasurer, died 1591

Mungo Russell (died 1591) was a Scottish merchant and treasurer of Edinburgh town council from 1575 to 1583. He was involved in setting up the paper mill at Roseburn in west Edinburgh known as Dalry Mills (north-west of Dalry).

== Career ==
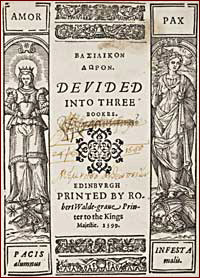
Robert Waldegrave printed the Basilikon Doron of King James VI.

Mungo Russell was primarily a textile merchant, and his brother Alexander (d. 1588) was also a merchant active in Edinburgh. Mungo sold linen cloth called "lane" to Mary, Queen of Scots in 1566. His wife's will mentions that he imported "lane and camerage" from Antwerp. As town treasurer, he purchased sweetmeats and a confection flavoured with rose water known as "scotchets" to banquet an English diplomat Francis Walsingham in August 1583.

Russell obtained the lands of "Dalry-Mills" (now by Murrayfield) to the west of Edinburgh and from 1582 built Roseburn House. He was associated with a paper mill on the Water of Leith operated on the estate by two German entrepreneurs Peter Grote Haere and Michael Keyser. They had been appointed paper makers to King James VI by privy seal letter. Some paper used in Scottish official documents and registers at this time has a royal "I.R.6" watermark.

Russell stocked paper of several qualities, including gilt-edged paper used for writing letters. Russell supplied paper to the printer Robert Waldegrave who relocated to Edinburgh in 1590. He supplied fine purple Florentine velvet to make a canopy for the entry and coronation of Anne of Denmark in Edinburgh in May 1590.

Russell died on 8 September 1591. His registered will records many current transactions and his stock of textiles. Most of the fabric listed was imported and the prices are recorded in Flemish money. He sold some cloth to tailors in Edinburgh, including Alexander Oustean. One fabric known as "tokdoir" or toque d'or was a gilt tinsel used in court masque costumes. A number of people owed him money, including John Mowbray of Barnbougle, William Baillie of Provan (for materials bought by his wife Elizabeth Durham), Agnes Leslie, Lady Lochleven, the carpenter Frances Mansioun, and Archibald Douglas, whose wife Barbara Napier was the widow of the bookseller George Ker. Russell owed money to Zachary Jocond, a hatmaker in Rouen. His legacies included a gift to Thomas Fenton, who was "keeper of the king's pets", the royal menagerie at Holyrood Palace.

== Family ==
Mungo Russell married Katherine Fisher. Their children included Gideon and Clement Russell. The children's nurse was Jonet Ramsay. After Katherine's death from the plague in 1585 at the Place of Dalry Mill, Mungo married Isobel Ker, and their children included William Russell. Mungo had three daughters, Isobel, Margaret, and Jean Russell.

At Roseburn House, a carved door lintel is inscribed "AL MY HOIP IS IN YE LORD" with the date 1582. A heraldic shield is flanked by the initials, "M.R" and "K.F" for Russell and Fisher. Another carved stone, a fireplace lintel possibly brought from another building, includes an allusion to the Scottish royal succession: "God keipe oure crowne & send gud succession". Gideon Russell, who died in 1601, continued building the house and his will details his debts owed to masons, carpenters, and to Hew Lyell (d.1619), a Leith timber supplier.

In February 1594, Gideon Russell and his wife Margaret Stewart made a new contract with the German paper makers Michael Keysar and John Seillar. They were making paper at the West Mill of Dalry. Gideon undertook to build a new drying room for the paper. The contract shows that the Russell family had entered into a commercial partnership with the German craftsmen and entrepreneurs. After Robert Waldegrave's death, on 12 January 1604 an Edinburgh court ordered Marion Waldegrave to pay Michael Keysar £16 for 15 reams of printing paper.
